= Canadian Pacific Lines in Maine =

Railway section

Overview
- Reporting mark: CP
- Locale: Jackman, Maine, Greenville, Maine, Brownville Junction, Maine, Mattawamkeag, Maine, Vanceboro, Maine, Fort Fairfield, Maine, Presque Isle, Maine, Washburn, Maine, Caribou, Maine, New Sweden, Maine
- Dates of operation: 1889–1988
- Predecessor: International Railway of Maine; European and North American Railway
- Successor: Canadian Atlantic Railway

Technical
- Track gauge: 4 ft 8 1/2 in (1,435 mm) standard gauge

The lines of the Canadian Pacific Railway operated in the State of Maine were set up as a separate company to comply with Interstate Commerce Commission regulations and were considered a Class I U.S. railroad (in 1950, railroads with operating revenues over $1 million). The company operated 234 miles in Maine.

Its primary route formed the Canadian Pacific east–west main line between Montreal, Quebec, and Saint John, New Brunswick. From 1889 to 1974 part of the through route consisted of trackage rights over the Maine Central Railroad between Mattawamkeag, Maine, and Vanceboro, Maine.

== History ==
The Canadian Pacific Lines in Maine were a conglomeration of routes purchased or built by the Canadian Pacific prior to 1900. Its through route included trackage rights over a segment of line owned by the Maine Central Railroad, which was later purchased outright by the CP. Two major components of the route were:

The European and North American Railway, which formed the easternmost connection from Vanceboro, Maine, with Saint John, New Brunswick, in the 1860s. The Canadian portion of this line was absorbed by the New Brunswick Railway, which itself was purchased by the Canadian Pacific in 1890. The American portion of the line was purchased by the Maine Central Railroad (MEC) and operated by that company. The CP exercised trackage rights over the MEC portion of the route, and purchased the line outright from the MEC in 1974. The assets of the New Brunswick Railway was sold, minus the operating rail lines, to businessman K.C. Irving in 1941, who later turned it over to his forest operations subsidiary J.D. Irving Limited. In 1988, citing declining traffic, the CP set up a subsidiary to control its lines east of Montreal, the Canadian Atlantic Railway. Between 1988 and 1993, many CAR lines were abandoned. In December 1994 all remaining CAR assets were sold. Some portions of the original New Brunswick Railway's rail lines were purchased by J.D. Irving Limited, which continues to operate them as the New Brunswick Southern Railway. Some former NBR trackage in Grand Falls is now owned and operated by the Canadian National Railway.

In November 2019 Canadian Pacific announced the purchase of the Central Maine and Quebec Railway, the current owner of the former Canadian Pacific Lines in Maine from outside Montreal to Brownville Junction, Maine. This move thus returns ownership of approximately half of the CP lines in Maine, as well as a portion of Bangor & Aroostook lines spanning from Millinocket to Searsport. The reasoning for CP's return, according to their press release, was to (re)establish a port connection at Saint John, New Brunswick, via commercial rights over the NBR lines as well as a new connect to the port of Searsport.

The International Railway of Maine was designed to connect the CP's lines in Canada with the European and North American Railway at Mattawamkeag. Planning for the line started in 1871, and the route was purchased by CP subsidiary Atlantic and Northwest in 1886. The CP finished various uncompleted portions of the Montreal-Saint John through route under Chief Engineer James Ross in the late 1880s, opening the line in June 1889.

In addition to the Montreal-Saint John through route, the Canadian Pacific's lines in Maine included a branch in the Aroostook River valley from Fort Fairfield to Presque Isle (27 miles), where they connected with CP subsidiary Aroostook Valley Railroad and competitor Bangor and Aroostook Railroad, as well as a branch that connected Debec, New Brunswick, with Houlton, Maine (8 miles).

In 1950, the freight income of Canadian Pacific Lines in Maine was $4.3 million, with an additional $424,000 in passenger revenue. The operating ratio was 90.1 percent.

== See also ==
- Iron Road Railways
- Montreal, Maine and Atlantic Railway
- Central Maine and Quebec Railway
- J.D. Irving Limited
- New Brunswick Railway
- Eastern Maine Railway
- European and North American Railway
