= Vanceboro (CDP), Maine =

Vanceboro, Maine
- Census-designated place
- Location within Maine Location within the United States
- Coordinates: 45°34′01″N 67°25′45″W
- Country: United States
- State: Maine
- County: Washington
- Town: Vanceboro

Area
  - Total: 0.83 sq mi (2.14 km^{2})
  - Land: 0.72 sq mi (1.86 km^{2})
  - Water: 0.10 sq mi (0.27 km^{2})
- Elevation: 381 ft (116 m)

Population (2020)
  - Total: 94
  - Density: 130.8/sq mi (50.52/km^{2})
- Time zone: UTC−5 (Eastern (EST))
  - Summer (DST): UTC−4 (EDT)
- ZIP Code: 04491
- Area code: 207
- FIPS code: 23-78640
- GNIS feature ID: 2806294

Vanceboro is a census-designated place (CDP) and the primary village in the town of Vanceboro, Washington County, Maine, United States. It is in northeastern Washington County, on the west side of the St. Croix River, which forms the Canada–United States border. Directly across the border is the small community of St. Croix, New Brunswick.

Maine State Route 6 passes through the center of Vanceboro, crossing the St. Croix River at the Vanceboro–St. Croix Border Crossing. Route 6 leads southwest 20 miles (32 km) to U.S. Route 1 in Topsfield, while to the east New Brunswick Route 4 leads 17 miles (27 km) to Thomaston Corner. The community is also the site of the Saint Croix–Vanceboro Railway Bridge, the only crossing between Canada and the United States to be attacked by a foreign force.

Vanceboro was first listed as a CDP prior to the 2020 census.

== Demographics ==
Historical population
Census	Pop.	Note	%±
2020	94		—
U.S. Decennial Census
