= New Brunswick Route 4 =

Highway in New Brunswick

Route 4

Route information
- Maintained by New Brunswick Department of Transportation
- Length: 28.3 km (17.6 mi)
- Existed: 1920s–present

Major junctions
- West end: SR 6 at the U.S. border in St. Croix
- East end: Route 3 in Thomaston Corner

Location
- Country: Canada
- Province: New Brunswick

Highway system
- Provincial highways in New Brunswick; Former routes
← Route 3	→ Route 7

Route 4 is a 28.3-kilometre (17.6 mi) long provincial highway located entirely in York County, New Brunswick, Canada. The highway begins on the Saint Croix – Vanceboro Bridge between the cities of Vanceboro, Maine and Saint Croix, and travels east to an interchange with Route 3 in Thomaston Corner.

== Route description ==
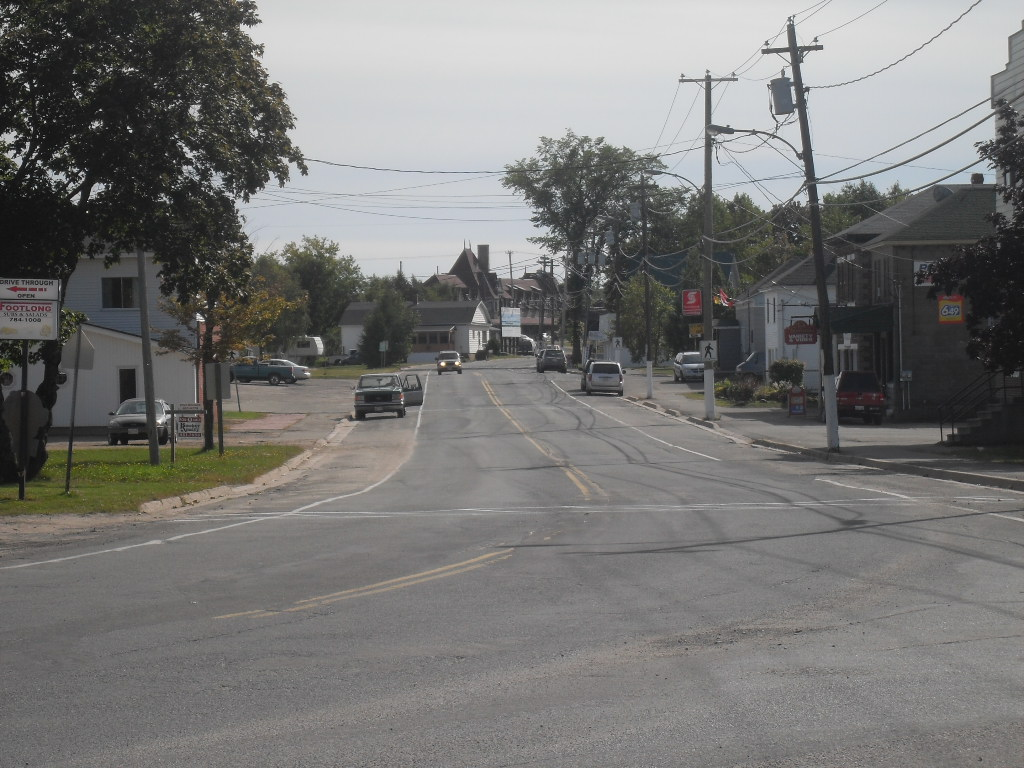
Route 4 as it passes through McAdam

Route 4 begins on the Saint Croix – Vanceboro Bridge over the Saint Croix River, which serves as both the boundary between Maine and New Brunswick and the border between the Eastern Time Zone and Atlantic Time Zone, traveling east through the customs station. Exiting Saint Croix, the highway crosses Route 630 as it begins to parallel a rail line belonging to the New Brunswick Southern Railway through rural York County. The highway is surrounded by woodlands until entering the Village of McAdam, where it serves as the main road through town, changing its name three times (Vanceboro Road, Saunders Road, and finally, Harvey Road). The highway turns more northerly through town then turns to the south before straightening out more in a more northeasterly direction again, entering more woodlands. Route 4 traverses the small community of Christie Ridge before terminating at an intersection with Route 3 in Thomaston Corner.

== History ==
Between McAdam and St. Croix, Route 4 follows the bed of one of New Brunswick's first railways, a wooden line built by a lumberman named Todd who wanted to transport his logs to the Saint Croix River. The line was deemed surplus with the construction of the parallel European and North American Railway in the late 1860s, immediately to the south, and it was later converted to a road.

== Major intersections ==
The entire route is in York County.

Location	mi	km	Destinations	Notes
Saint Croix River	0.0	0.0	SR 6 west (Saint Croix – Vanceboro Bridge) – Vanceboro, Topsfield	Western terminus
Saint Croix	1.3	2.1	Route 630 – St. Stephen, Lakeland Ridges	
McAdam	5.1	8.2	Saunders Road	
McAdam	7.1	11.4	Old Harvey Road	
Thomaston Corner	17.6	28.3	Route 3 – St. Stephen, Fredericton	Eastern terminus
1.000 mi = 1.609 km; 1.000 km = 0.621 mi
