= International Railway of Maine =

Railroad linking Canada and the US

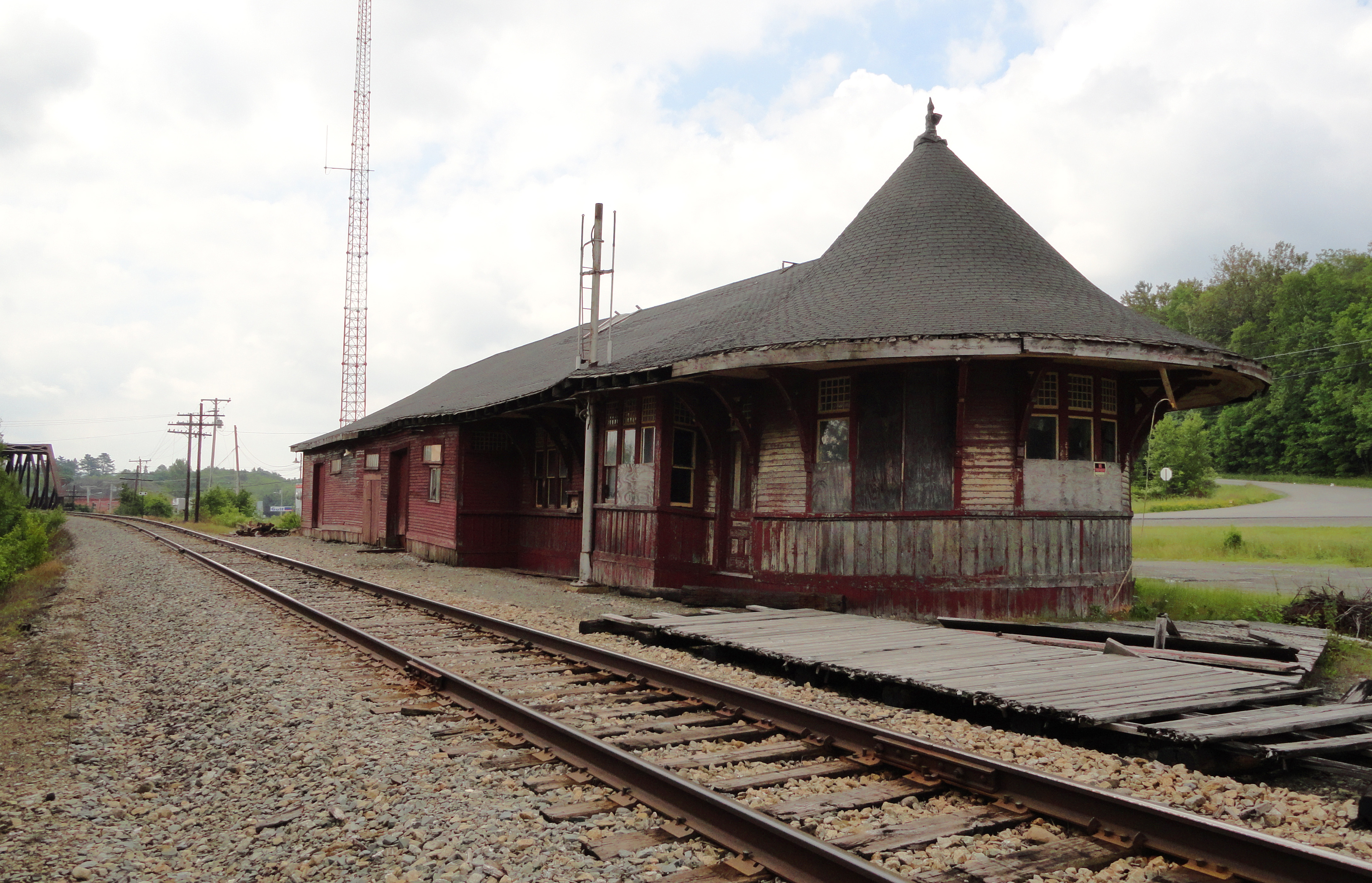
Abandoned CPR passenger station at Greenville Junction, Maine, opened in 1889. The last passenger service using this station ended on December 17, 1994, with discontinuation of Via's Atlantic service. In the distance is a trestle leading to the former junction with the Bangor and Aroostook Railroad at Moosehead Lake.

The International Railway of Maine was a historic railroad constructed by the Canadian Pacific Railway (CPR) between Lac-Mégantic, Quebec, and Mattawamkeag, Maine, closing a key gap in the railway's transcontinental main line to the port of Saint John, New Brunswick.

== Winter alternative to Montreal ==
The CPR completed its route from Montreal, Quebec, to Vancouver, British Columbia, in 1885. In the decades prior to the use of ice-breaking ships in the Gulf of St. Lawrence and St. Lawrence River, the port of Montreal was closed from December to May, limiting any advantage that the railway might have over its competitors.

CPR's primary Canadian competitor, the Grand Trunk Railway (GTR), managed to avoid the winter ice problems in Montreal by using the ice-free port of Portland, Maine, accessed by a route constructed by the St. Lawrence and Atlantic Railroad which the GTR had purchased in the mid-1850s.

The Delaware and Hudson Railway ran a feeder route down the valleys of Lake Champlain and the Hudson River to New York City. The Maine Central Railroad operated an arduous route over the White Mountains from St. Johnsbury, Vermont, to Portland.

Looking 350 miles directly east from Montreal however, CPR surveyors saw the Canadian port of Saint John, New Brunswick, was underutilized and Saint John was accessible by a route across northern Maine which was less mountainous than other options for reaching the Atlantic coast.

== Existing railways ==
Some sections of a direct railway route between Montreal and Saint John already existed in the 1880s:

- The International Railway began operating in 1875 between Sherbrooke and Megantic in Quebec to service the forest industry. As suggested by the name of the company, its builders envisioned extending further east into Maine. This company was the successor to an original charter granted to the St Francis and Megantic International Railway.
- The European and North American Railway was constructed as part of a plan to link the Maritime provinces with the North American rail network at Portland. Organized as separate companies, the E&NA had built a section from Shediac, New Brunswick, west to Saint John in the late 1850s but had gone bankrupt and the colonial government had assumed its operation. The E&NA built a western extension from Saint John to the International Boundary at St. Croix, New Brunswick, and Vanceboro, Maine, during the 1860s, while the E&NA in Maine had built from Bangor up the Penobscot River valley to the hamlet of Mattawamkeag at the confluence with the Mattawamkeag River before turning east across the lowlands of eastern Maine to the border at Vanceboro-St. Croix; this section having opened in 1869. Another bankruptcy at the E&NA saw the New Brunswick portion from Saint John to the border purchased by the New Brunswick Railway and the Maine portion from Bangor to the border leased by the Maine Central Railroad.

== Building the International of Maine ==
A roughly 100 mile / 160 km gap between Mattawamkeag and Megantic required new construction to complete the Montreal-Saint John direct route.

The CPR acquired the International Railway in the mid-1880s and surveyed a line running directly from Megantic to a point on the E&NA (then leased by the Maine Central) at Mattawamkeag. This portion of new railway would cross the International Boundary between Megantic, Quebec and Jackman, Maine, thus the CPR organized two separate companies:

- The International Railway was incorporated federally in Canada for the portion between Megantic and the border. In 1886 it was sold to the Atlantic and North-West Railway, a CPR subsidiary.
- The International Railway of Maine was incorporated in the state of Maine to cross the sparsely populated Appalachian Mountains between the Quebec-Maine border and Mattawamkeag and assumed the charter of a previous company of the same name that had been organized in 1871. It was also sold to the Atlantic and North-West in 1886. A little known 374-meter (1227-foot) long steel trestle 38 meters (124 feet) above Ship Pond Stream near Onawa was replaced by a viaduct in 1931. Until 6 July 1960, railway employees along this remote line were paid from the last pay car operating in the United States or Canada.

Construction under Chief Engineer James Ross began in 1886–1887 and proceeded in both directions from various points on the route. The new line opened in June 1889 and CPR obtained trackage rights over the Maine Central from Mattawamkeag to Vanceboro, and purchased the New Brunswick Railway to acquire control of the route from Vanceboro to Saint John, as well as a branch line network in western New Brunswick and northern Maine.

== Interchange points ==
The new CPR line across Maine to Saint John was the last link in creating a transcontinental railway, although the section from Mattawamkeag to Vanceboro was operated under trackage rights. In 1955, the Maine Central purchased the E&NA shares for approximately US$3 million and in 1974, CPR purchased the Mattawamkeag-Vanceboro portion from the Maine Central, finally securing ownership and operation of its entire transcontinental network.

The CPR operated its new line across Maine as its International of Maine Division (Canadian Pacific Lines in Maine) for many years; the International Railway of Maine existing on paper for operating purposes, however the track and all operations became seamless in the CPR system.

The Quebec Central Railway anticipated that the new CPR main line across Maine to its winter port of Saint John would result in traffic to Quebec City, thus the QCR built a line from the CPR at Megantic north to Tring Junction and thence on to Vallee Junction in the Beauce River valley.

The north-south oriented Bangor and Aroostook Railroad created an interchange with CPR at Brownville Junction, Maine, and had an earlier interchange where Bangor and Aroostook predecessor Bangor and Piscataquis Railroad reached the south end of Moosehead Lake at Greenville Junction. Bangor and Aroostook dismantled the Greenville branch in 1961.

In addition to interchanging with CPR at Vanceboro and Mattawamkeag, the Maine Central had an interchange with the CPR from 1906 to 1933 west of Greenville Junction where the Kineo branch crossed at Somerset Junction en route to Kineo Station connections with steamboats serving the Mount Kineo House.

Two logging railroads also interchanged with the International of Maine Division. There was an interchange at Jackman with Jackman Lumber Company's Bald Mountain Railroad from 1915 to 1926, and with the Ray Lumber Company (later Indian Lake Lumber Company) railroad at Ray Siding near Caribou Stream in Bowerbank Township from 1912 to 1929.

=== Ray Lumber Company locomotives ===
Number	Builder	Type	Date	Works number	Notes
1	Lima Locomotive Works	Shay locomotive	21 August 1912	2560	purchased new; sold to Appalonia Lumber Company of Pelahatchie, Mississippi
2	Manchester Locomotive Works	4-4-0	May 1884	1195	formerly Bangor and Aroostook Railroad #201; purchased 1913

== Passenger and freight service ==
The new route was served by CPR's passenger rail service between Windsor Station in Montreal and Union Station in Saint John, where passengers could continue on the Intercolonial Railway to Moncton and Halifax.

Until the early 1960s, traffic on the International of Maine Division was extremely heavy and the railway was well-used.

The 201 mile section of railway across the state of Maine was operated directly by CPR from 1889 to 1988. The opening of the St. Lawrence Seaway in 1958 and the provision of icebreaking services for the port of Montreal by the new Canadian Coast Guard after the 1960s saw the importance of a winter port at Saint John diminish.

== World Wars ==
During World War I, the CPR line became infamous for being the sabotage target of a German army officer. The United States was still a neutral country at that point and CPR was not permitted to transport war material and troops across US soil on the way to Saint John; most war goods for Canada's war effort were transported entirely in Canada on the government-owned Intercolonial Railway route instead. However Imperial Germany was convinced that CPR's route across Maine was being used for the war effort and sought to destroy the Saint Croix–Vanceboro Railway Bridge over the St. Croix River between Vanceboro, Maine, and St. Croix, New Brunswick. The officer travelled to Vanceboro on a Maine Central passenger train and stayed several nights in the local hotel, then laid explosives which detonated but did not destroy the bridge. He was arrested and then jailed by the United States before eventually being extradited and jailed in Canada.

A year after the armistice, 23 died in an Onawa train wreck when a freight train collided head on with the third of four passenger trains carrying immigrants recently arrived on a liner from Europe. The crew of the 26-car freight train became confused about the number of trains required to carry all the passengers. All were operating as sections of a single regularly scheduled passenger train, but the last was 8 hours late.

== Traffic declines ==
In 1955, CPR created a limited stop express passenger train named The Atlantic Limited. This daily train operated overnight from Montreal to Saint John and vice versa, with full service diner, observation and coach/sleeper cars.

Government investment in the 1970s for an intermodal container terminal and various improvements at Saint John resulted in some freight traffic increases and CPR invested in infrastructure improvements over the route, however by the 1980s, it was in severe decline as changes in shipping patterns and cargo logistics saw CPR make less and less return on the line.

In 1978, Via Rail Canada took over operation of CPR passenger services and The Atlantic Limited was changed to become the Atlantic and service was extended east from Saint John to Halifax. Passenger traffic increased but government cutbacks in 1981 saw the train discontinued, removing passenger service from the Montreal-Saint John route for the first time since the route opened in 1889. The Atlantic was restored in 1985 and remained in daily service until 1990 and then tri-weekly service thereafter.

In 1988, CPR organized all its lines east of Montreal into Maine and the Maritimes (including its Dominion Atlantic Railway subsidiary in Nova Scotia) under a new subsidiary called the Canadian Atlantic Railway (CAR). The CAR experiment was short-lived as its lines were still losing money, despite abandoning many of its small rural branch lines in western New Brunswick and northern Maine. CPR applied in 1993 to abandon the mainline from Montreal to Saint John but was refused by government regulators.

== Abandonment and sale ==
In 1994 it applied again for abandonment and permission was granted for the end of that year. Shippers and communities along the route were upset and urged CPR to sell the line, which it finally did in sections on January 1, 1995. In advance of the pending abandonment and later sale of the line, Via Rail discontinued passenger service with the Atlantic on December 17, 1994, and the line has not had dedicated passenger service since then.

The section from Saint John to the Maine–New Brunswick border was purchased by New Brunswick Southern Railway, a subsidiary of J. D. Irving Limited, an industrial conglomerate and major traffic source in Saint John. The section from the Maine-New Brunswick border west to Mattawamkeag (where it interchanges with Guilford Rail System) and on to Brownville Junction (where it interchanges with Bangor and Aroostook Railroad) was also sold to a JDI subsidiary, Eastern Maine Railway. West of Brownville to Montreal, the route was purchased by Iron Road Railways, the corporate owner of the Bangor and Aroostook Railroad.

The bankruptcy of Iron Road in the early 2000s saw the western part of the system taken over by the newly organized Montreal, Maine and Atlantic Railway (which filed for bankruptcy protection in August 2013), while JDI continues at the eastern end of the route.

Fortress Investment Group purchased the trackage owned by the Montreal Maine and Atlantic out of bankruptcy. This includes the portion of the International Railway of Maine from Brownville Junction to the west. Operations began in 2014 as the Central Maine and Quebec Railway.

As of June 4, 2020, Canadian Pacific has purchased the entire Central Maine and Quebec Railway and has begun the process of integrating the former CM&Q lines. This includes the former Bangor and Aroostook lines owned by the Central Maine and Quebec which had no prior ties to Canadian Pacific.
