= Vanceboro =

Vanceboro is the name of several places in the United States of America:

- Vanceboro, Maine, a town
  - Vanceboro (CDP), Maine, the main village in the town
- Vanceboro, North Carolina, a town
