= Eastern Maine Railway (1995) =

Railroad in Maine

Overview
- Headquarters: Saint John, New Brunswick
- Reporting mark: EMRY
- Locale: Maine, New Brunswick
- Dates of operation: 1995–

Technical
- Track gauge: 4 ft 8 1/2 in (1,435 mm) standard gauge

The Eastern Maine Railway Company Limited (reporting mark EMRY) is a 99.5 mi (160.1 km) U.S. short line railroad owned by the New Brunswick Railway Company, a holding company that is part of "Irving Transportation Services", a division within the industrial conglomerate J.D. Irving Limited.

Together with its sister company New Brunswick Southern Railway (reporting mark NBSR), EMRY and NBSR form a continuous 189.5 mi (305.0 km) main line connecting Saint John, New Brunswick with Brownville Junction, Maine in addition to another 41.7 mi (67.1 km) of branch lines owned and operated by NBSR in Canada. A sister company Maine Northern Railway (reporting mark MNRY) operates a separate 258-mile railway system connecting Millinocket, Maine with Van Buren, Maine.

== History ==
EMRY was established as a corporate entity on November 10, 1994 by J.D. Irving Ltd. to purchase the 99.5 mile right of way and physical railway assets of the Canadian Pacific Railway's Mattawamkeag Subdivision rail line within the state of Maine, running from its eastern terminus at the Canada–United States border, this being the midpoint of the Saint Croix–Vanceboro Railway Bridge at Vanceboro, west to Brownville Junction.

Both EMRY and NBSR began operations on January 6, 1995 approximately 1 week after Canadian Pacific Railway abandoned operations of its Canadian Atlantic Railway (CAR) subsidiary on December 31, 1994. In addition to owning the former CPR tracks in Maine, EMRY was an operating entity for the first several months of existence and had running rights over its sister company NBSR's tracks from the International Boundary east to the yard at McAdam, New Brunswick. In spring 1995 Irving Transportation Services consolidated its railway operations as Eastern Maine Railway Company Limited came under NBSR operational control.

== Route ==
EMRY's corporate trackage is a continuation of the NBSR mainline at the International Boundary in Vanceboro, immediately across the St. Croix River from the hamlet of St. Croix. From Vanceboro, EMRY's trackage runs 105 miles west to Brownville Junction with a connection along the way to Pan Am Railways (reporting mark PAR) serving southern New England at Mattawamkeag. EMRY connects with the former Central Maine & Quebec Railway (reporting mark CMQ) at Brownville Junction, which operates part of the north-south former Bangor and Aroostook Railroad trackage in Maine, as well as the continuation of the CPR mainline from Brownville Junction west to Montreal.

The tracks between Vanceboro and Mattawamkeag were built as part of the European and North American Railway which connected Saint John, New Brunswick with Bangor, Maine, opening in 1869. The section west of Mattawamkeag to Brownville Junction was built by the Canadian Pacific Railway as part of its International Railway of Maine subsidiary, opening in 1889 to connect Montreal with Saint John; this line made CPR a transcontinental railway system. The E&NA tracks from Bangor to Vanceboro via Mattawamkeag were leased in the 1870s and purchased in the 1950s by the Maine Central Railroad and later purchased in 1974 by CPR.

As a portion of the Bangor and Aroostook line from Millinocket south through Brownville Junction was not part of MM&A's sale of track to the state, EMRY's track is not contiguous to Irving-operated Maine Northern Railway (MNRY). In the Montreal, Maine and Atlantic Railway bankruptcy auction, EMRY had made a joint bid with Pan-Am's Springfield Terminal Railway for the former MM&A trackage in Maine - a move which could have re-unified the Bangor and Aroostook under Irving's banner. An initial Radio-Canada report that this bid was successful was quickly contradicted by other sources (including the English-language Canadian Broadcasting Corporation and the Canadian Press news wire) which indicate all of the former MM&A rails went to Fortress Investment Group subsidiary Railroad Acquisition Holdings. According to a statement from Wayne Power, vice president of J.D. Irving’s transportation and logistics division, "In the end, the trustee went forward with a single buyer of the entire MMA railway line. We look forward to working with Fortress Investment Group of New York as they assume operation of the MMA railway."

== Operations ==
Today most locomotives hauling trains that operate over EMRY are owned and carry the reporting marks of NBSR. Some maintenance of way equipment is owned by EMRY but the majority of the company's assets are the physical tracks and right of way from Vanceboro to Brownville Junction, as well as the running rights in New Brunswick to McAdam.

== See also ==
- New Brunswick Southern Railway - official website
- New Brunswick Southern Railway - unofficial site
