= New Brunswick Railway =

Canadian holding company

Overview
- Headquarters: Woodstock, New Brunswick
- Locale: Western New Brunswick, Canada
- Dates of operation: 1870–

Technical
- Track gauge: 4 ft 8 1/2 in (1,435 mm) standard gauge
- Previous gauge: originally 3 ft 6 in (1,067 mm)

The New Brunswick Railway Company Limited (NBR) is currently a Canadian non-operating railway and land holding company headquartered in Saint John, New Brunswick that is part of Irving Transportation Services, a division within the J.D. Irving Limited (JDI) industrial conglomerate. It is not to be confused with another JDI company, New Brunswick Southern Railway (NBSR), established in 1995, which is an operational railway and considered a sister company of the NBR.

The New Brunswick Railway was also a historic Canadian railway operating in western New Brunswick. Its headquarters while an operational railway were in Woodstock. It was acquired by the Canadian Pacific Railway in 1890 and its operations and name were subsumed by the CPR. The NBR was maintained by CPR as a non-operating holding company for its land and property in New Brunswick; this company was sold to industrialist K.C. Irving in 1941 that saw all land ownership including timber holdings and railway rights of way transferred to the Irving conglomerate. CPR leased the physical railway assets from NBR and retained the right to operate them until CPR abandoned operations in New Brunswick in late 1994.

The original NBR lines in the Saint John River valley were built to 3 ft 6 in (1,067 mm) narrow gauge. These tracks were converted to 4 ft 8 1/2 in (1,435 mm) in 1881.

== History ==
New Brunswick industrialist Alexander Gibson commissioned a survey in 1866 for a railway line extending from his mill facilities in South Devon at the junction between the Nashwaak and Saint John Rivers opposite Fredericton, north to Edmundston to service timber lands which he leased from the Crown. A charter for the railway was received from the provincial government in 1870 and the New Brunswick Land and Railway Company was formed. Part of the charter provided for additional timber land based upon construction performance, thereby making Gibson one of the largest landowners in the province.

=== Narrow gauge lines ===
The route was envisioned to eventually extend further north along the Madawaska River and Lake Témiscouata to the Saint Lawrence River at Rivière-du-Loup; however, the company never built beyond Edmundston, leaving this connection to be completed by the Temiscouata Railway.

The southern section of the main line ran along the east bank of the Saint John River from South Devon northwest to Keswick where it headed inland (north) away from the Saint John River and followed the Keswick River to Barton before heading west to Millville and northwest to East Brighton and Hartland where it again followed the east bank of the Saint John River. This section was built between 1871 and 1873.

The section from Hartland to Edmundston was much more difficult to construct and was built between 1871 and 1878. The line from Hartland north to Perth remained on the east bank of the Saint John River. At Perth it crossed to the west bank, bridged across the mouth of the Aroostook River, and continued to Grand Falls, where it crossed back to the east bank before continuing to Edmundston.

=== Expansion by NBR ===
The NBR system expanded significantly in the late 1870s and early 1880s. One of the first expansions was the acquisition of the Aroostook River Railroad which had built up the south bank of the Aroostook River from its connection with the NBR at Aroostook, New Brunswick to Caribou, Maine. This line was built between 1873 and 1876 and was leased to the NBR in 1878. As a result, Aroostook became a major division point for the NBR's northern system and had extensive yard facilities.

In 1881, the New Brunswick Land and Railway Company changed its name to the New Brunswick Railway Company. That same year the 3 ft 6 in (1,067 mm) narrow gauge lines from South Devon to Edmundston as well as the line from Aroostook to Caribou were converted to 4 ft 8 1/2 in (1,435 mm).

The following year on July 1, 1882, the NBR acquired control of the New Brunswick and Canada Railway (NBCR) under a 999 year lease. The NBCR traced its history to the St. Andrews and Quebec Railway (SA&Q) which had a charter to build from Passamaquoddy Bay at St. Andrews north to McAdam and on to Quebec City across much of what is now northern Maine; construction plans in the 1840s from southwestern New Brunswick to Canada East halted due to uncertainty over the location of the Canada–United States border. The border was subsequently resolved in the Webster-Ashburton Treaty and the SA&Q began construction in the early 1850s, however, the delays saw the competitive advantage of St. Andrews disappear with the opening of the Atlantic and St. Lawrence Railroad in 1853 that connected the Canadian rail network at Montreal, Quebec with the Atlantic coast port of Portland, Maine. In 1856 the SA&Q declared bankruptcy and its assets and charter were purchased and reorganized as the New Brunswick and Canada Railway with track extended north to Richmond Corner near the newly defined border. Although the NBCR intended to complete construction across Maine to Quebec City, it would never extend beyond Richmond Corner due to the political situation in the United States during the 1860s (American Civil War) as well as the financial situation NBCR faced with the competing European and North American Railway project.

The 1881 conversion of the NBR to standard gauge track, followed by the 1882 purchase of the New Brunswick and Canada Railway saw a 9.5 mi (15.3 km) section of the NBR's original narrow gauge line between Shewan and Hartland abandoned. A new line was built from Shewan west to the east bank of the Saint John River at Newburg where it joined a new line being built from the NBCR at Debec via Woodstock where it crossed to the east bank of the Saint John River and on to Hartland.

The final major expansion of the NBR took place in 1883 when it acquired the European and North American Railway's (E&NA) "Western Extension" and the Fredericton Branch Railway. The "Western Extension" line was built from 1865-1869 from South Bay on the west side of the Saint John River opposite Saint John to the International Boundary at St. Croix. The Fredericton Branch Railway was built from 1867-1869 from Hartt's Mills to Fredericton.

=== Acquisition by Canadian Pacific Railway ===
Beginning in 1886, the Canadian Pacific Railway began looking to expand its presence east of Montreal. Typical of much of its expansion in southern Ontario, CPR looked to purchase or lease existing lines rather than survey and build itself. CPR president George Stephen was a shareholder with Gibson in the NBR and looked to extend the CP system to New Brunswick or Nova Scotia to gain access to ports in the Maritimes.

Between 1886 and 1888, CPR built the International Railway of Maine, also referred to as the "Short Line", across a gap between Quebec's Eastern Townships and the Maine Central Railroad at Mattawamkeag, Maine (on the European and North American Railway "Maine" section). From Mattawamkeag to the International Boundary at Vanceboro-St. Croix, CPR gained trackage rights from the Maine Central.

CPR sought, and was given, a lease on the New Brunswick Railway for a period of 990 years beginning on July 1, 1890, resulting in a mainline from Montreal to Saint John and the feeder network of NBR branchlines to St. Stephen and St. Andrews as well as Fredericton and the upper Saint John River valley. This development gave CPR access to the port of Saint John and until the opening of the St. Lawrence Seaway in the 1950s and subsequent expansion of government ice breaking services for shipping, Saint John would become CPR's winter port on the Atlantic coast when Montreal was ice-bound.

In 1912, a section of the government-built and operated National Transcontinental Railway (NTR) opened between Moncton and Lévis. Part of the NTR closely paralleled Canadian Pacific's original NBR narrow gauge line between Cyr (just north of Grand Falls) to Edmundston, along the east bank of the Saint John River. In the 1930s, CPR abandoned a 26 mi (42 km) section of the former NBR between Cyr and Iroquois (approximately 1 mi (1.6 km) east of Edmundston) and used trackage rights over Canadian National Railways, which the NTR had been merged into in 1918.

=== Expansion by CPR ===
Following its acquisition of the NBR in 1890, CPR undertook several expansions to the system. These were acquired by the CPR as separate companies and were not merged with the NBR company:

- Tobique Valley Railway—This line was built between 1891 and 1894 from the connection with the CPR (ex-NBR) line at Perth up the south bank of the Tobique River to Tobique Valley. Acquired by CPR in 1897.
- Central Railway—This line was built in stages by several companies between 1886 and 1913 from the connection with the CPR (ex-NBR) line at South Devon along the north shore of Grand Lake to Chipman and south to the Intercolonial Railway at Norton. Acquired by CPR in 1913.
- Southampton Railway—This line was built between 1911 and 1912 from the connection with the CPR (ex-NBR) line near Millville west to the Saint John River at Otis. Acquired by CPR in 1912.
- Carleton, City of Saint John Branch Railroad—This line was built between 1870 and 1871 from the connection with the "Western Extension" line at Fairville (part of Lancaster) to the western side of Saint John Harbour. Acquired by CPR in 1890s after the Reversing Falls Railway Bridge opened in 1885.
- Grand Southern Railway—This line was built between 1876 and 1881 from the connection with the "Carleton, City of Saint John Branch Railroad" at Lancaster to St. Stephen, connecting with the NBCR near Elmwood and at St. Stephen. Acquired by CPR in 1911.

=== Sale of NBR to K.C. Irving ===
In the 1940s, CPR sought to reduce non-railway properties in New Brunswick and entered into an agreement with industrialist K.C. Irving, whereby the entire NBR was sold to his forestry subsidiary J.D. Irving Limited. CPR leased the railway tracks and other surface assets from J.D. Irving Ltd. which owned the land including the railway rights of way. In this fashion, Irving was able to secure some of the most extensive timber holdings in the province during a period at the beginning of the Second World War when JDI had entered into major contracts to supply wood veneer for defence contracts, particularly for construction of the de Havilland Mosquito.

=== Abandonment by CPR ===
In 1988, citing declining traffic, CPR grouped all of its lines east of Montreal into a new internal marketing and business unit called Canadian Atlantic Railway (CAR). Also beginning in 1988 and extending through to 1993, CAR began the process of abandoning much of the trackage of the former NBR system, citing declining traffic and bridges at Woodstock and Perth-Andover which were washed away in the spring freshet and ice jams of 1987. CPR completely removed itself from operations east of Montreal in 1994 when CAR trackage was sold to shortline operators. The only remnant of the original NBR system is a short segment of trackage in Grand Falls, operated by Canadian National.

=== Continuation as holding company ===
J.D. Irving Ltd. continues to retain ownership of the NBR to this very day. The NBR functions in two different but inter-related ways:

- It functions as a land holding company, owning the railway rights of way and timber holdings in New Brunswick that were part of the NBR when it was sold by CPR to K.C. Irving in 1941.
- NB&M Railways functions as a railway holding company for the various railway subsidiaries within the "Irving Transportation Services" division of J.D. Irving Ltd.; these being the New Brunswick Southern Railway, the Eastern Maine Railway, Maine Northern Railway.

== Interchange points ==
At its height in the early 20th century, the CPR's ex-NBR system interchanged with other railways at the following locations:

- South Devon - Canada Eastern Railway, later part of Canadian National Railways (CNR)
- Woodstock - Saint John and Quebec Railway, later part of CNR
- Cyr - National Transcontinental Railway, later part of CNR
- Iroquois - National Transcontinental Railway, later part of CNR
- Edmundston - Temiscouata Railway, later part of CNR
- Minto - National Transcontinental Railway, later part of CNR
- Chipman - National Transcontinental Railway, later part of CNR
- Norton - Intercolonial Railway, later part of CNR
- Saint John - Intercolonial Railway, later part of CNR
- St. Stephen - Maine Central Railroad
- St. Croix - European and North American Railway, later part of Maine Central Railroad

== Narrow gauge locomotives ==
The following narrow gauge locomotives were operated on the NBR until conversion to standard gauge in the early 1880s.

Number	Builder	Type	Date	Works number	Notes
1	Mason Machine Works	0-4-4F			second-hand locomotive of unknown origin
2	Mason Machine Works	0-4-4F	1873	489	
3	Mason Machine Works	0-4-4F	1873	509	allocated CPR # 531, but scrapped before being re-gauged
4	Mason Machine Works	0-4-4F	1873	510	allocated CPR # 532, but scrapped before being re-gauged
5	Mason Machine Works	0-4-4F	1873	526	allocated CPR # 533, but scrapped before being re-gauged
6	Mason Machine Works	0-4-4F	1873	527	sold 1882 to Herkimer, Newport and Poland Railway
7	Mason Machine Works	0-4-4F	1873	531	sold 1881 to Prince Edward Island Railway 2nd # 1
8	Mason Machine Works	0-4-4F	1873	532	sold 1881 to Prince Edward Island Railway 2nd # 2
9	Baldwin Locomotive Works	2-6-0	1877	4211	sold 1882 to Harbour Grace Railway but lost at sea
10	Baldwin Locomotive Works	2-6-0	1878	4345	sold 1882 to Harbour Grace Railway # 12
