= NBM Railways =

NBM Railways is a holding company controlled by the J.D. Irving group of New Brunswick.

Its operations include the New Brunswick Southern Railway (NBSR) and Eastern Maine Railway (EMRY), a pair of short line railways which operate on a former Canadian Pacific mainline segment between Brownville, Maine and Saint John, New Brunswick.

Irving also operates a portion of the former Bangor & Aroostook Railroad line north of Millinocket, Maine on state-owned rails as the Maine Northern Railway.

== See also ==
- J.D. Irving
- New Brunswick Railway
