= 1915 Vanceboro international bridge bombing =

Bridge sabotage by German spies

Vanceboro international bridge bombing
- The bridge after the sabotage

Details
- Date: February 2, 1915
- Location: Saint Croix–Vanceboro Railway Bridge
- Coordinates: 45.564011°N 67.427452°W
- Country: United States / Canada border
- Operator: Maine Central Railroad / Canadian Pacific Railway
- Cause: Bombing, sabotage by German spies

The 1915 Vanceboro international bridge bombing was an attempt to destroy the Saint Croix–Vanceboro Railway Bridge on February 2, 1915, by Imperial German spies.

This international bridge crossed the St. Croix River between the border hamlets of St. Croix in the Canadian province of New Brunswick and Vanceboro in the U.S. state of Maine. At the time of the sabotage attempt in 1915, the bridge was jointly owned and operated by the Canadian Pacific Railway (reporting mark CP) on the Canadian side and the Maine Central Railroad (reporting mark MEC) on the American side.

The bombing was masterminded by then spymaster Franz von Papen and executed by Werner Horn. The bomb failed to destroy the bridge but made it unsafe to use until minor repairs were done. The explosion did however blow out windows in nearby buildings in St. Croix and Vanceboro.

== Background ==
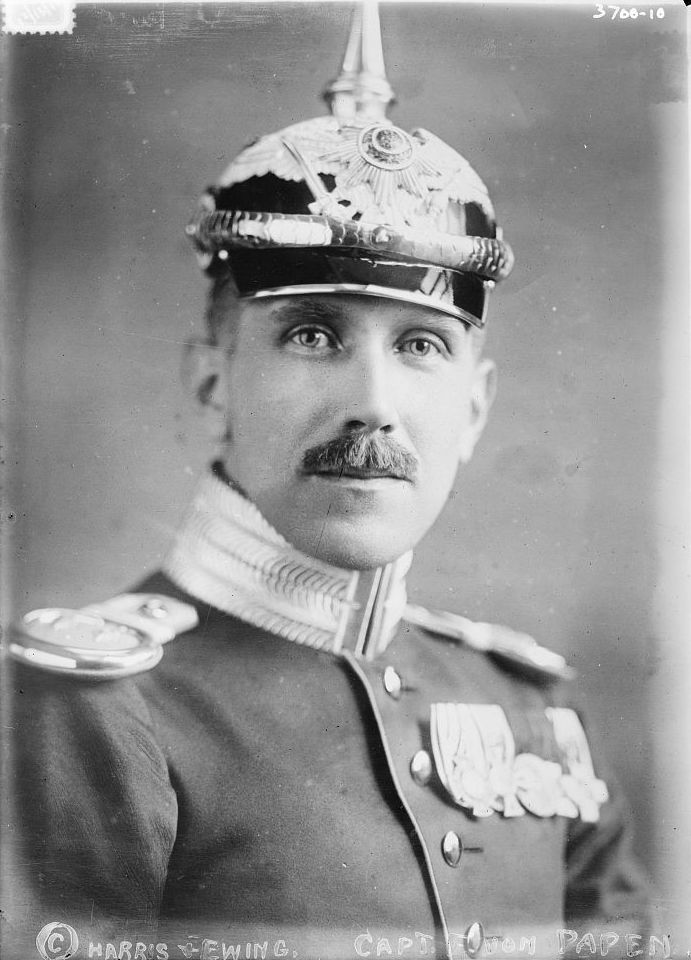
Franz von Papen in 1915

In 1915 the United States was still a neutral country in World War I. The Canadian Pacific Railway was enjoined from carrying any war goods or troops onto or through United States territory. After Japan entered the war in 1914 on behalf of its British ally, Germany feared that Japan might send troops to the Western Front, across the Pacific Ocean and through Canada, en route. The German government was convinced that would occur and ordered that the Canadian railway system be interrupted.

At the outbreak of World War I, Werner Horn was a German reserve army lieutenant who had been in Moka, Guatemala, as the manager of a coffee plantation. Horn had seen ten years of service in the German Army when, in 1909, he got a furlough from the authorities in Cologne permitting him to go to Central America for two years. After hearing about the outbreak of war, he departed the plantation looking to return to Germany. From Moka, he proceeded to British Honduras, and from there sailed to Galveston, Texas, and onwards to New York City. He was unable to depart for Germany due to the British blockade in the North Sea. After attempting to set sail for over a month, he travelled to Mexico City to return to the plantation. While there, he learned that someone else had taken his job. He found work at another plantation in Salto de Agua, Chiapas, but before he could leave, he received a card telling him to return to Germany.

On December 26, 1914, Horn travelled to New Orleans and then returned to New York, where he stayed in the Arietta Hotel. While there he met Franz von Papen, the military attaché of the German Embassy in Washington, DC. Von Papen was seeking saboteurs to disrupt Canadian railways and thought that Horn, who was eager to serve the fatherland, was an ideal candidate. Von Papen went on to explain to the zealous Horn that the bombing would be seen as an act of courage and valour in Germany and that no one would be killed in the process. Unbeknownst to Horn, the bridge was heavily used at the time, and there was a good chance that a train would be caught up in any explosion. Horn was paid $700 ($22,300 in 2025) to destroy the St. Croix-Vanceboro railway bridge. Von Papen had written the cheque for this amount on January 18, 1915.

The Vanceboro bombing was part of a broader German sabotage campaign orchestrated by von Papen from his position as military attaché. The Canadian Pacific Railway line through Vanceboro was strategically significant as it moved troops and materiel through Maine and across the Vanceboro Bridge to the Port of Saint John, a major shipping entrepot for Allied men and materiel during World War I. Despite its importance, the bridge had been left unguarded since October 1914.

== Bombing ==
Horn left New York from Grand Central Terminal on a New Haven Railroad passenger train to Boston on January 29, 1915, carrying a suitcase of dynamite. He took the overnight train out of Boston (operated by the Boston and Maine Railroad), placing the suitcase of explosives in a lower berth. Horn's sleeping car was transferred to the Maine Central Railroad in Portland and proceeded east across Maine to the Maine Central's eastern terminus at the border hamlet of Vanceboro the following day. Upon arrival in Vanceboro, Horn checked into the Exchange Hotel and was observed hiding the suitcase in a wood pile outdoors while scouting the railway bridge on the border over the St. Croix River several hundred feet to the east; this bridge was jointly owned by the Canadian Pacific Railway and the Maine Central Railroad. At least three Vanceboro residents reported his suspicious behaviour to the US immigration inspector. The inspector interviewed Horn at the hotel, and Horn assured him that he was merely a Danish farmer looking to purchase land in the area. Horn spent the next two days maintaining a low profile and watching the extremely-busy Canadian Pacific Railway main line to determine the schedule of trains.

On the night of Monday, February 1, 1915, Horn checked out of the hotel claiming to be catching a train that evening. He apparently changed into a German army uniform to avoid being convicted of being a spy (and potentially executed) before proceeding to the railway bridge over the St. Croix River sometime after midnight.

Horn proceeded to position a suitcase filled with explosives on the Canadian side of the bridge but was interrupted by an oncoming train and was forced to move out of its path. After he was sure that it had passed, he proceeded to reposition the explosives. He was interrupted a second time by another train. Puzzled and not wanting to kill anyone, he waited until 1:07 a.m. on February 2 before again repositioning the bomb on a girder. Horn cut the fuse, which changed the time before the explosion from fifty minutes to only three. Horn lit the fuse with a cigar and somehow made it back to the Exchange Hotel through a gale in −30 °F (−34 °C) temperature before the dynamite exploded. At 1:10 a.m. on Tuesday, February 2, 1915, the bomb exploded, blowing out windows across Vanceboro and St. Croix and exposing residents to the freezing air outside. Some iron beams on the bridge were twisted or bent, but the damage was relatively minor.

Werner Horn (left) with Deputy Sheriff Geo. W. Ross (right)

Horn had frostbite on his hands and was assisted by the hotel's proprietor, who allowed him to check back in for the night. The proprietor connected the explosion with Horn's suspicious presence and, upon being informed by residents of the community who had discovered the source and target of the explosion, informed the CP, which closed the bridge and rerouted trains pending a safety inspection.

Railway officials inspected the bridge the following morning and discovered the damage was relatively minor, resulting in the bridge being out of service for only several days.

== Arrest and imprisonment ==
The sheriff of Washington County (for Vanceboro), along with two Canadian police officers from McAdam, New Brunswick, who crossed the border to provide assistance, detained Horn at the hotel. Horn reportedly changed into his German army uniform (to avoid being arrested as a spy, which was an executable offence) and surrendered to American authorities. Since the bomb exploded on the Canadian (St. Croix, New Brunswick) side of the bridge, the only charge that the United States could initially lay against Horn to detain him was a mischief charge for breaking windows in Vanceboro.

Horn was moved soon thereafter to a jail in Machias, Maine, while Canadian authorities began the process of seeking his extradition. Horn was interrogated by the Bureau of Investigation for several days and signed a confession with an agreed-upon statement of facts in which he revealed the details of his crime.

Horn faced a federal grand jury in Boston at the United States District Court for the District of Massachusetts and was indicted on March 2, 1915, for his most serious crime while in the United States, a charge of transporting explosives on a common carrier that also transported passengers for hire. He was sentenced to serve 18 months at the Atlanta Federal Penitentiary in Georgia.

After serving his sentence, Horn was extradited to Canada in October 1919 and was tried in the Court of King's Bench of New Brunswick in Fredericton. He was found guilty and sentenced to serve 10 years at Dorchester Penitentiary in New Brunswick. Horn was assessed by Canadian prison authorities to be insane in July 1921, when he was released and deported to Germany. He was in fact suffering from the advanced stages of syphilis.

== Aftermath ==
The Vanceboro incident contributed to von Papen being recalled to Germany by the end of 1915. The bombing helped awaken American officials to the fact that Germans were using agents, including the military attaché in Washington, Franz von Papen, to organize activities aimed at conducting attacks on Canada and served to worsen relations between Germany and the United States.

The Vanceboro attack was followed by larger German sabotage operations, including the Black Tom explosion in New York Harbor on July 30, 1916, which destroyed 2 million pounds of arms and ammunition.
