= Pay car =

A pay car was an official railway car operated as a mobile bank to disburse cash wages to railway employees in locations including North America and Australia. Railway company employees were widely dispersed with some maintaining track in relatively remote locations, while others moved from place to place with train crews. A railway pay car was typically attached to a train traveling over the line at fixed intervals to disburse wages to employees, who would assemble at every station and designated intermediate stopping points to be paid. The pay car was usually a converted passenger car fitted out with two doors allowing formation of a queue through the identification and disbursing procedure. The pay car also contained sleeping and eating facilities for the paymaster, armed guards, clerks maintaining pay records, and a cook.

== History ==
Railways brought industrialized jobs to remote locations without banking facilities. Efficiency was increased by avoiding wasted man-hours assembling employees at a central pay location. The trains offered greater security than alternative methods of bringing payroll cash to remote locations. The pay car might be run as a separate extra train or included in a regularly scheduled train, with appropriate routing and scheduling to accommodate the numerous stops. Pay cars were discontinued in favor of wage paychecks when local banks became available and automobile ownership increased among employees. Canadian Pacific Railway operated the last pay car in the United States or Canada weekly over the International Railway of Maine until 6 July 1960. Mexican railways used pay cars for a few more decades.

== See also ==
- Money train, one or more railcars to collect fare collection revenue from stations and return it to a central location.
