= Canadian Atlantic Railway =

Canadian and U.S. railway (1988–1994)

Overview
- Headquarters: Saint John, New Brunswick
- Locale: Nova Scotia, New Brunswick, Quebec, Maine
- Dates of operation: 1988–1994

Technical
- Track gauge: 4 ft 8 1/2 in (1,435 mm) standard gauge

The Canadian Atlantic Railway (CAR) was a Canadian and U.S. railway that existed from 1988 to 1994.

The CAR was created in September 1988 as a business unit of CP Rail (CPR) to serve the Maritime Provinces and the state of Maine. Its creation was predated by several years of declining traffic during the 1980s on CPR's eastern mainline from Montreal to Saint John and its supporting branchlines. The assets of CAR were sold or abandoned in stages and the company ceased to exist December 31, 1994, as CP Rail exited eastern Canada and at the same time ceased to be a transcontinental railway.

== Lines ==
The CAR included all lines operated by CPR east of Megantic, Quebec, totaling 909.3 mi (1,463.4 km).

| Subdivision or Spur | Province or State | From | To | Length |
|---|---|---|---|---|
| Aroostook Subdivision | NB & ME | Aroostook, NB | Washburn Junction, ME | 33.1 mi (53.3 km) |
| Champlain Spur | NB | Chamcook, NB | Bayside, NB | 3.6 mi (5.8 km) |
| Edmundston Subdivision | NB | Aroostook, NB | Edmundston, NB | 56.1 mi (90.3 km) (incl. 27.4 mi (44.1 km) CN joint track) |
| Fredericton Subdivision | NB | Fredericton Junction, NB | Fredericton, NB | 22.2 mi (35.7 km) |
| Fundy Gypsum Spur | NS | Mantua, NS | Mantua, NS | 0.7 mi (1.1 km) |
| Gibson Subdivision | NB | Newburg, NB | South Devon, NB | 59 mi (95 km) |
| Halifax Subdivision | NS | Windsor Junction, NS | Kentville, NS | 56.1 mi (90.3 km) |
| Houlton Subdivision | NB & ME | Debec Junction, NB | Houlton, ME | 8 mi (13 km) |
| Kentville Subdivision | NS | Kentville, NS | Annapolis Royal, NS | 58.4 mi (94.0 km) |
| Kingsport Spur | NS | Kentville, NS | Aldershot, NS | 2.3 mi (3.7 km) |
| Mattawamkeag Subdivision | NB & ME | McAdam, NB | Brownville Junction, ME | 105.1 mi (169.1 km) |
| McAdam Subdivision | NB | Saint John, NB | McAdam, NB | 84.4 mi (135.8 km) |
| Minto Spur | NB | South Devon, NB | Barkers Point, NB | 0.9 mi (1.4 km) |
| Moosehead Subdivision | ME & QC | Brownville Junction, ME | Megantic, QC | 117.1 mi (188.5 km) |
| Milltown Spur | NB | St. Stephen, NB | Milltown, NB | 4.6 mi (7.4 km) |
| Shogomoc Subdivision | NB | McAdam, NB | Aroostook, NB | 105.8 mi (170.3 km) |
| Southampton Subdivision | NB | Southampton, NB | Nackawic-Millville, NB | 9.4 mi (15.1 km) |
| St. Andrews Subdivision | NB | Watt, NB | St. Andrews, NB | 27.5 mi (44.3 km) |
| St. Stephen Subdivision | NB | McAdam, NB | St. Stephen, NB | 33.9 mi (54.6 km) |
| Tobique Subdivision | NB | Perth, NB | Tobique Valley, NB | 27.5 mi (44.3 km) |
| Truro Subdivision | NS | Windsor, NS | Mantua, NS | 4.4 mi (7.1 km) |
| West Saint John Subdivision | NB | Lancaster, NB | West Saint John, NB | 3.2 mi (5.1 km) |
| Yarmouth Subdivision | NS | Annapolis Royal, NS | Yarmouth, NS | 86 mi (138 km) |

== History ==
The rail lines comprising the CAR system were built by the European and North American Railway, New Brunswick Railway, International Railway of Maine, Dominion Atlantic Railway, the Windsor and Annapolis Railway and the Nova Scotia Railway.

During the late 1980s and early 1990s, the CAR abandoned almost all of its branch lines in New Brunswick and Maine north of McAdam, NB except for a remnant of the Edmundston Subdivision which was preserved as an industrial spur in Grand Falls, NB. South of McAdam, the St. Stephen Subdivision was kept, as well as its core industrial spurs in western Saint John and the mainline McAdam, Mattawamkeag and Moosehead Subdivisions connecting the Maritimes to Montreal. In Nova Scotia, the CAR abandoned the lines west of Kentville to Yarmouth following cancellation of Via Rail services in January 1990.

By 1993, traffic had declined on the CAR's Saint John-Montreal route to fewer than 25,000 carloads per year (including Via Rail's Atlantic). This amount of traffic was unsustainable for the route, forcing CP Rail to apply for abandonment with U.S. and Canadian regulators, however the company was denied in lieu of selling the track to another operator. Several short line railroad companies subsequently entered into negotiations with CP Rail to purchase the entire CAR.

Negotiations for purchasing the lines in New Brunswick, Maine and Quebec with the short line operators fell through in early 1994 and CP Rail reapplied for abandonment with regulators for its line across Maine between Saint John and Megantic, later extended west to Lennoxville. An abandonment date of December 31, 1994, was established should no purchaser be found in the interim.

Meanwhile, in August 1994 the CAR sold its lines in Nova Scotia, that being the track of its Dominion Atlantic Railway subsidiary, to Washington, DC–based holding company Iron Road Railways, which owned the Bangor and Aroostook Railroad; the new operation was called the Windsor and Hantsport Railway.

As the abandonment date for its lines in New Brunswick, Maine and Quebec drew nearer, it became apparent that CP Rail did not have a short line operator in line to purchase the route. Despite vociferous protests by communities along its route, Via Rail announced the cancellation of the Atlantic effective December 17, 1994, merging the train's equipment, crews and schedule with its Ocean route.

CP Rail had entered negotiations with the privately owned New Brunswick–based industrial conglomerate J.D. Irving Limited and Iron Road Railways in December however a purchase agreement could not be reached before the abandonment deadline passed, thus the CAR was formally abandoned and sat dormant for the first week of January 1995 until a sale agreement was finalized.

== Sale ==
The resulting sale of the line from Saint John to Megantic was divided as follows:

- J.D. Irving
  - West Saint John Subdivision
  - McAdam Subdivision
  - St. Stephen Subdivision
  - Mattawamkeag Subdivision
- Iron Road Railways
  - Moosehead Subdivision

J.D. Irving established two companies to operate its lines:

- Eastern Maine Railway owns the lines in Maine
- New Brunswick Southern Railway owns the lines in New Brunswick

Iron Road Railways established one company to operate its line:

- Canadian American Railroad
