= Saint Croix–Vanceboro Railway Bridge =

Railway bridge between Canada and the United States

Coordinates: 45.5639°N 67.4275°W

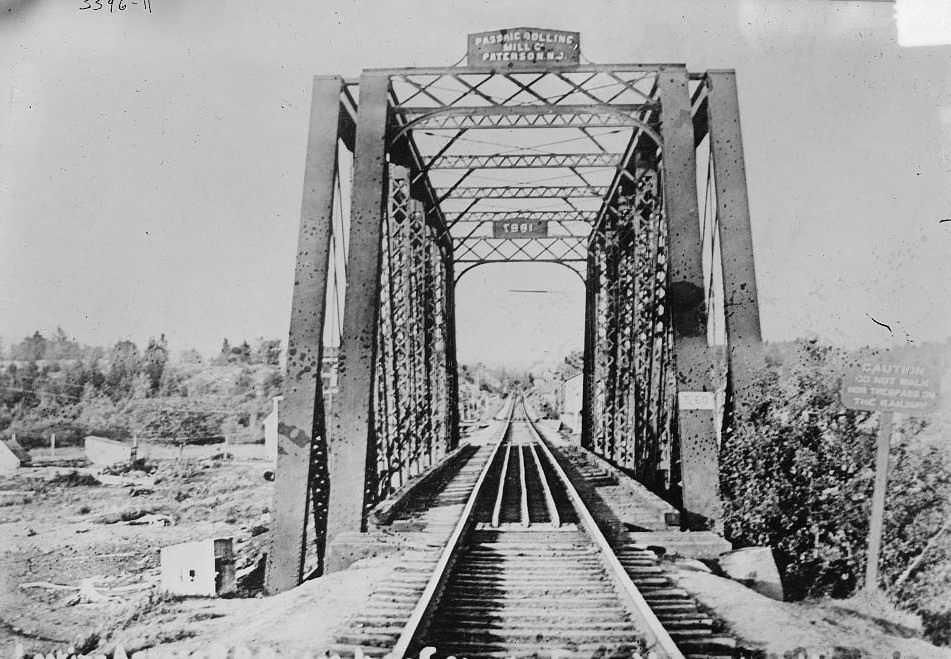
View of the bridge between 1910 and 1915

The Saint Croix–Vanceboro Railway Bridge is a 100-foot-long (30 m) railway bridge crossing the St. Croix River from St. Croix, New Brunswick, Canada, to Vanceboro, Maine, United States. A deck truss design, it is owned and operated by the New Brunswick Southern Railway.

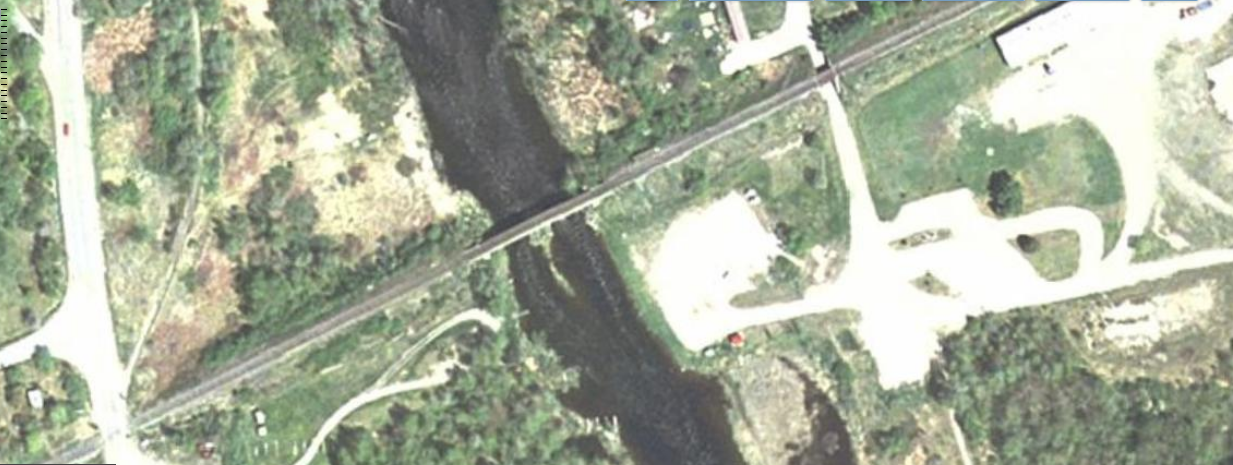
Aerial image of the bridge

== History ==
The first railway bridge over the St. Croix River at this location was opened in October 1871 by U.S. President Ulysses S. Grant and Governor General of Canada Lord Lisgar on the completion of the European and North American Railway (E&NA) between Bangor, Maine, and Saint John, New Brunswick.

Railway bridges at this location endured divided ownership from 1871 until 1974. The New Brunswick portion of the E&NA was reorganized as the Western Extension and later folded into the New Brunswick Railway. The Maine portion of the E&NA was leased to the Maine Central Railroad in 1882. In 1889, MEC granted operating rights over its tracks, Mattawamkeag to Vanceboro, to the Canadian Pacific Railway. In 1955, MEC purchased the E&NA from its shareholders and in 1974 sold the "joint" line, including its portion of the Saint Croix–Vanceboro Railway Bridge, to the CPR. On January 1, 1995, the CPR sold the line to the New Brunswick Southern Railway.

The through truss bridge was replaced with the current deck truss design in the mid-20th century.

== 1915 sabotage attempt ==
On February 2, 1915, Lt. Werner Horn, a German army reservist, bombed the international railway bridge crossing the St. Croix River from Vanceboro into Canada in an unsuccessful attempt to sabotage the CPR line across Maine; it was alleged that the railway was being used to transport materiel across the then-neutral United States territory.

== See also ==
- List of international bridges in North America
