= Saint Croix–Vanceboro Bridge =

- Canadian Border Station at St. Croix, NB
- Coordinates: 45°34′07.58″N 67°25′42.86″W
- Crosses: St. Croix River
- Locale: Maine–New Brunswick border

Characteristics
- Design: Deck truss
- Material: Reinforced concrete
- Total length: 37.82 metres (124.1 ft)
- No. of lanes: 2

History
- Built: 1927
- Opened: 1928
- Rebuilt: 1997

Location
- Interactive map of Saint Croix–Vanceboro Bridge

The Saint Croix–Vanceboro Bridge is an international bridge, which connects the communities of St. Croix, New Brunswick in Canada and Vanceboro, Maine in the United States, across the St. Croix River. The bridge consists of three reinforced concrete slab spans for a total length of 37.82 metres (124.1 ft), which carries a two lane roadway across the river.

The bridge was constructed in 1927 as a concrete T-beam structure, and opened in 1928. The original bridge was replaced with the current deck in 1997.

Transport Canada estimated the bridge's traffic at 66,635 vehicles annually in 2006.

A few hundred yards south of this crossing is also an international rail bridge which is notable for the 1915 Vanceboro international bridge bombing incident where a German spy attempted to destroy the bridge. Prior to the 1956 completion of Interstate 95, this border crossing was part of the primary route between Bangor, Maine and Fredericton, New Brunswick.

== Border crossing ==
The Vanceboro - St. Croix Border Crossing connects the towns of Vanceboro, Maine and St. Croix, New Brunswick on the Canada–United States border. The Canadian government has at times called this crossing McAdam, named for the larger municipality east of St. Croix. In the early 1900s, this crossing was located at the adjacent lock structure a short distance to the north. At some point in the distant past (at least prior to 1930), a bridge existed to the south of the railroad bridge, extending from Public Crossing Road on the Canadian side. Concrete footings for this bridge remain on the US side at this site.

== See also ==
- List of international bridges in North America
