= McAdam, New Brunswick =

McAdam
- Village
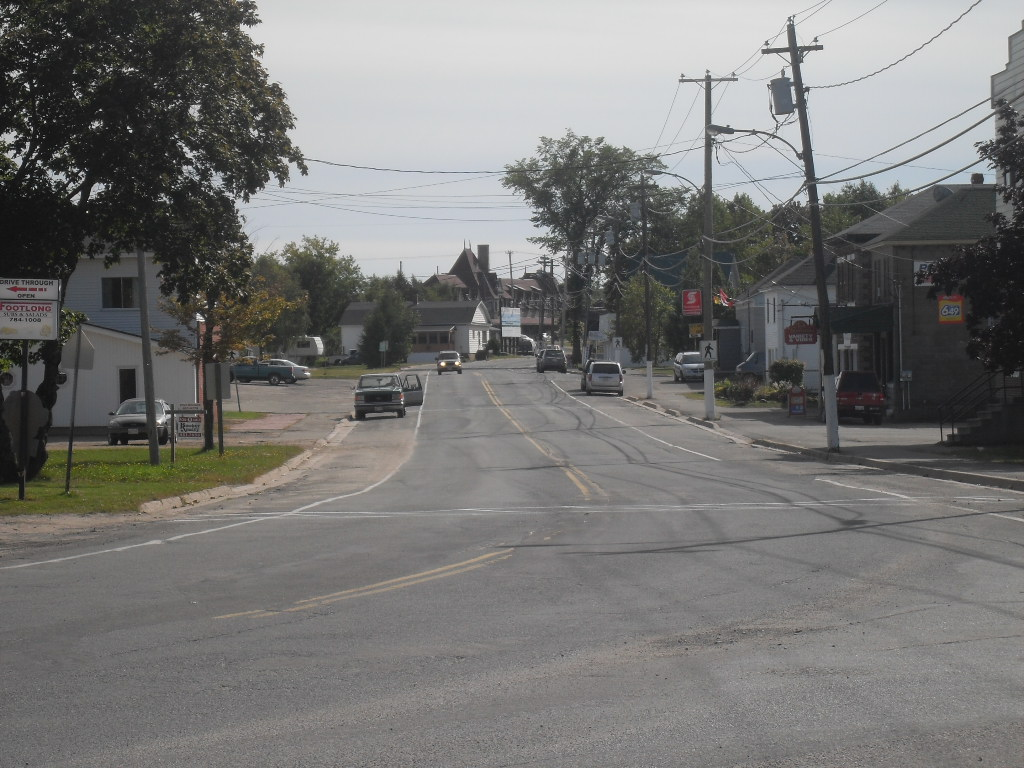
- Saunders Road in McAdam with the McAdam railway station in the background
- Motto(s): "Discover our History, Delight in our Nature"
- Location of McAdam within New Brunswick
- Coordinates: 45°35′40″N 67°19′33″W
- Country: Canada
- Province: New Brunswick
- County: York County
- Parish: McAdam Parish
- Incorporated: 1966
- Founded by: John McAdam
- Named after: John McAdam

Government
  - Type: Municipal council
  - Mayor: Ken Stannix
  - Deputy mayor: Taylor Gallant
  - Council: Greg Swim, Jody Robinson, Mitchell Little

Area
  - Land: 14.19 km^{2} (5.48 sq mi)
- Elevation: 146 m (479 ft)

Population (2021)
  - Total: 1,173
  - Density: 82.7/km^{2} (214/sq mi)
  - Change (2016–21): ▲1.9%
- Time zone: UTC−4 (Atlantic (AST))
  - Summer (DST): UTC−3 (Atlantic Daylight Time (ADT))
- Canadian Postal code: E6J
- Area code: 506
- NTS Map: 021G11
- GNBC Code: DBAQZ
- Website: www.mcadamnb.com

McAdam is a village located in the southwestern corner of York County, New Brunswick, Canada. The village covers 14.28 square kilometres (5.51 sq mi) and had a population of 1,151 as of 2016. An independent study was executed early 2018, and the results found that the population of McAdam had grown to 1,225. Turning the tide of a shrinking population, this is the first time the community's population grew since 1956.

The area was first settled in the mid-to-late 19th century as a group of small lumber camps. The area further developed due to its advantageous location as an important railway junction between the main line of the Canadian Pacific Railway from the Maritime provinces to New England and central Canada and branch lines to St. Stephen, St. Andrews and Woodstock. The town was an important servicing stop for many passenger and freight trains, as well as military trains during the World Wars. A large railway station was built to accommodate travelers and a roundhouse and yard were located in the village. The conversion of locomotives from steam power to diesel during the 1950s, as well as highway improvements and increased trucking during the 1960s and 1970s, saw McAdam decline in importance for rail transport. Decreased employment with the railway caused significant economic challenges for the community during the latter half of the 20th century and early 21st century.

== History ==
Original settlement of present-day McAdam area began sometime between 1857 and 1869, after the establishment of the St. Andrews and Quebec Railway (SA&Q). McAdam began under the name of City Camp which was originally a collective of several lumbering encampments which sprang up alongside the line. By the late 1860s the European and North American Railway's "Western Extension" was completed. This line joined the SA&Q line (by now part of the New Brunswick Railway) in City Camp; as a result City Camp was renamed to McAdam Junction after John McAdam, a prominent lumberman and politician, who had numerous land grants in the Canterbury Parish and Dumfries Parish parishes at that time.

By 1871, McAdam was a junction of limited importance and this contributed to a rise in population to about four hundred people, mostly railroad workers and their families. On June 2, 1879, it was announced that a rail line would be built to neighbouring community in Vanceboro, Maine, 10 km away. The contract was awarded for approx. $30,000. Soon after, a road was built that ran parallel to the tracks. The rail line and road remain in use today

In 1894 the parishes of Prince William and Dumfries were merged into a new parish known as the Parish of McAdam. In 1889, the Canadian Pacific Railway (CPR) built the International Railway of Maine: the final link making it the first transcontinental railway. The following year, the CPR leased the New Brunswick Railway for nine hundred ninety-nine years. The CPR began an ambitious construction project on a massive station/hotel at the junction in 1900; construction was completed in 1901 and expanded in 1911. The station became the dominant feature of the settlement and would go on to be a major employer for the junction, heralding a period of growth.

World War I and II both had a staunch impact on the community. Trains carrying soldiers east to ports such as Halifax passed through McAdam. Trains often stopped for inspection and servicing at the station and demand for workers caused the population in the town to continue to rise. In 1915, a German agent, Werner Horn, attempted to destroy the international railroad bridge between Vanceboro, Maine and St. Croix, New Brunswick - immediately west of McAdam - in order to limit the movements of war supplies to the port of Saint John. His attempt proved futile, as the bridge was not severely damaged and was returned to service several days later.

The change from steam locomotives to diesel locomotives during the 1950s proved to be devastating for McAdam's economy. Trains no longer needed to stop as frequently for service and the railway station in McAdam lost the importance it once had. New highways constructed after the war saw trucks and automobiles reduce the need for the branch lines to St. Stephen, St. Andrews and Woodstock. Local passenger trains from McAdam to these destinations were canceled in the early 1960s, leaving The Atlantic Limited as McAdam's only remaining passenger train. These changes in turn caused the station's hotel to close later in the decade.

Already suffering from new technological developments and its isolation from any other reliable source of employment, McAdam was devastated after the CPR transferred operation of its passenger service to Via Rail Canada in 1978.^{[a]} In 1981, Via cancelled the Atlantic, although it was revived in 1985 before being permanently cancelled in December 1994, whereby CPR closed the station. In January 1995, CPR transferred ownership of the building to the village at the same time as it sold its rail lines through the village to the New Brunswick Southern Railway.

Recent fundraising efforts by the village have resulted in renovations and restoration efforts for the station, which is now a museum and tourist attraction for the community. The village hosted the 2009 New Brunswick Day in an effort to generate awareness of the community's rich history.

== Geography and climate ==
McAdam is located in the New Brunswick Highlands.

Climate data for McAdam
Month	Jan	Feb	Mar	Apr	May	Jun	Jul	Aug	Sep	Oct	Nov	Dec	Year
Mean daily maximum °C (°F)	−3.9 (25.0)	−2.2 (28.0)	2.4 (36.3)	9.4 (48.9)	16.7 (62.1)	22.3 (72.1)	24.9 (76.8)	23.7 (74.7)	19.2 (66.6)	13.2 (55.8)	5.7 (42.3)	−1.5 (29.3)	10.8 (51.4)
Mean daily minimum °C (°F)	−15.6 (3.9)	−15.6 (3.9)	−9.2 (15.4)	−2.2 (28.0)	3.5 (38.3)	8.9 (48.0)	12.2 (54.0)	11.0 (51.8)	6.4 (43.5)	−1.4 (29.5)	−3.6 (25.5)	−12 (10)	−1.2 (29.8)
Average precipitation mm (inches)	38.8 (1.53)	36.3 (1.43)	33.3 (1.31)	64.9 (2.56)	88.4 (3.48)	86.1 (3.39)	93.3 (3.67)	96.0 (3.78)	99.0 (3.90)	92.4 (3.64)	107.1 (4.22)	62.1 (2.44)	1,176.8 (46.33)
Source: Industry and Labour Adjustment Committee, McAdam, New Brunswick

== Demographics ==
In the 2021 Census of Population conducted by Statistics Canada, McAdam had a population of 1,173 living in 534 of its 600 total private dwellings, a change of 1.9% from its 2016 population of 1,151. With a land area of 14.19 km^{2} (5.48 sq mi), it had a population density of 82.7/km^{2} (214.1/sq mi) in 2021.

Historical population
Year	Pop.	±%
1883	250	—
1901	714	+185.6%
1911	1,111	+55.6%
1921	1,614	+45.3%
1931	1,946	+20.6%
1941	2,265	+16.4%
1951	2,611	+15.3%
1956	2,803	+7.4%
1961	2,669	−4.8%
1966	2,448	−8.3%
1971	2,224	−9.2%
1981	1,857	−16.5%
1991	1,600	−13.8%
1996	1,570	−1.9%
2001	1,513	−3.6%
2006	1,404	−7.2%
2011	1,284	−8.5%
2016	1,151	−10.4%
2021	1,173	+1.9%
2024	1,261	+7.5%

The first recorded population of McAdam came from the 1901 census, recording a population of 714 people. Over the next half-century as the rail operations in McAdam expanded, the population increased substantially: a result of the promise of employment. The population peaked in 1956 at 2,803 people: nearly four times that of the 1901 census. However, with the collapse of the rail industry in the village, the employment prospects dried up. Isolated, with no new source of jobs, the population began a steady decline: a process which has continued up to the present. Fifty years since its peak population, the number of persons living in McAdam has been more than halved.

Due to community spirit and leadership, the population of McAdam grew for the first time in a generation, starting in 2018. Growth has been attributed to selling lots for $1 and the expansion of the local campground. More recently, families have been flocking to McAdam looking for a small-town rural home, while also having amenities of the city such as schools, municipal water and sewer, and also all essential shopping needs.

== Economy ==
Economy (2016)
Rate	Village	Province
Unemployment rate	2.3%	11.2%
Participation rate	45.8%	61.5%

McAdam's economy consists of well-rounded employment sectors, ranging from manufacturing, professional, public sector and healthcare. Tourism plays a role as well, welcoming over 30,000 visitors each year to the McAdam Train Station alone.

=== Manufacturing ===
==== Certainteed Gypsum ====
The village's main employer is Certainteed Gypsum, which directly employs 57 employees, not including contract work, security or transportation drivers, which is believed to bring total employment to over 75 people. The McAdam Certainteed Gypsum plant manufactures a variety of wallboard, which is then sent to all regions of North America.

The plant closed in 2021.

==== Soleno Maritimes Inc. ====
Soleno Inc. produces high-density polyethylene resin pipes used for storm drains and fittings that are shipped throughout Atlantic Canada. The plant employs 25 people. In 2013 the New Brunswick government invested $125,000 in payroll rebates to help replace its assembly line to keep production going.

=== Healthcare ===
McAdam Health Centre, which is adjoined to Wauklehegan Manor, employs approximately 54 employees.

== Entertainment ==
In 1965, the most watched movie in McAdam was The Sound of Music at the Vogue Movie Theatre. One viewer saw it 42 times. The theatre closed in 1988.

In 1994, Eatons filmed a television commercial at the train station three months before national train routes stopped.

In 2016, Jonny Harris made his celebrity debut at his show at McAdam High School on CBC's Still Standing.

== Recreation ==
McAdam has a wide variety of recreation facilities that serve all ages. These facilities include Youth Centre - Warriors Den, outdoor skating rink, tennis court, basketball court, walking trail, two gymnasiums, weight room, two baseball fields, two parks, seniors club and beach.

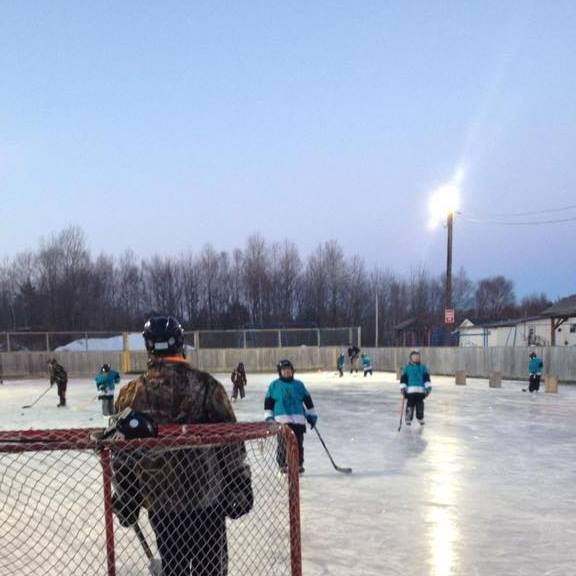
McAdam outdoor skating rink

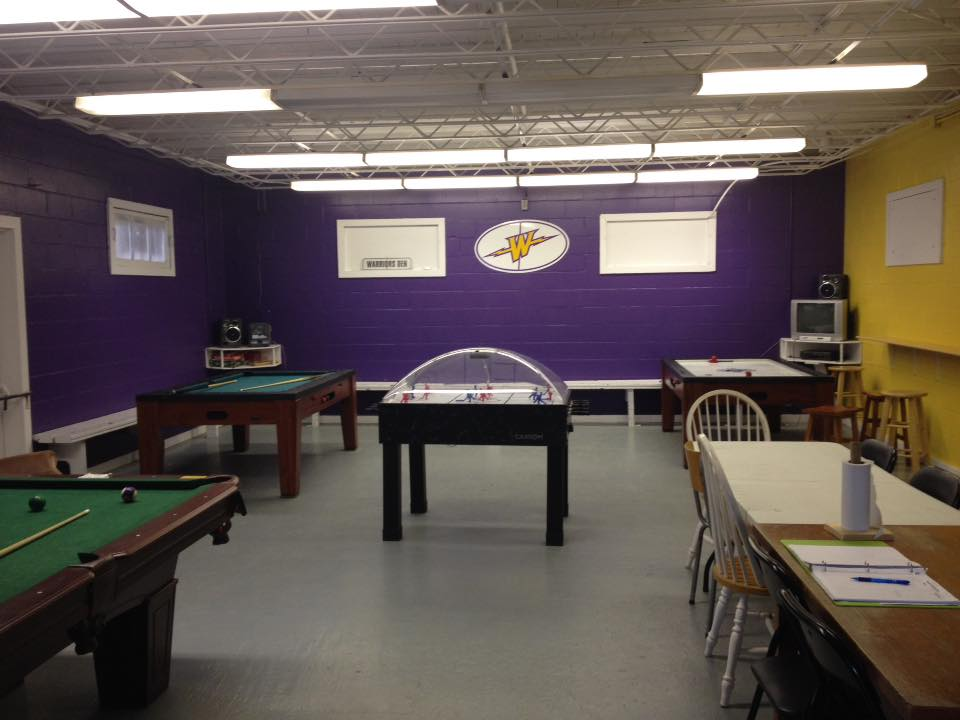
McAdam Warriors Den - Youth Centre

== Notes ==
- ^[a] The CPR retained ownership of the station.

== Notable people ==
- Gregory Evans - first Integrity Commissioner for the province of Ontario
- Heidi Hanlon - curler, 11-time provincial women's champion skip

== See also ==
- List of communities in New Brunswick
