= St. Croix, New Brunswick =

Coordinates: 45.564244°N 67.425928°W

St. Croix is a rural community in York County, New Brunswick, Canada. The community derives its name from the St. Croix River, which flows along its western boundary; this river also forms the Canada–United States border, and the community is opposite Vanceboro, Maine, to the west.

St. Croix is located 8 kilometres west of the village of McAdam. The western terminus of Highway 4 is at the border on the Saint Croix–Vanceboro Bridge over the St. Croix River, where it connects with the eastern terminus of Highway 6 in Maine. The New Brunswick Southern Railway crosses the river using the Saint Croix–Vanceboro Railway Bridge. The Canada Border Services Agency maintains a customs station in St. Croix immediately east of the bridge; this border crossing has not been open 24 hours a day since August 24, 2022, due to train traffic.

== History ==
=== Railway history ===
During the 1800s, St. Croix developed as an isolated lumbering settlement; however, in the 1860s the community was selected as the crossing point for the European & North American Railway (Western Extension), which was constructing a line from Saint John to Vanceboro. At Vanceboro, a sister company's line had opened through to Bangor in 1869. An iron railway bridge on stone piers was constructed over the St. Croix, measuring approximately 30 metres (100 feet) in length. The 1871 opening ceremony of the railway line between the two countries was attended by Governor General of Canada, Lord Lisgar, and the President of the United States, Ulysses S. Grant.

During the 1870s, financial difficulties saw the line from Saint John to St. Croix sold to the New Brunswick Railway (NBR). At the same time, the Maine Central Railroad (MEC) leased the E&NA from Vanceboro to Bangor; it would purchase the line in the 1950s. In 1889, the Canadian Pacific Railway (CPR) purchased the NBR and constructed the International Railway of Maine to connect Montreal to the ice-free winter port of Saint John, leasing trackage rights over the section owned by the Maine Central between Vanceboro and Mattawamkeag. In 1974, CP Rail purchased this section, completing its ownership of a transcontinental railway from the Atlantic to the Pacific.

St. Croix had a customs facility operated by the Government of Canada to inspect trains entering New Brunswick, as well as a small passenger station; however, the opening of the major station in McAdam soon led to the majority of residents using that facility, leaving St. Croix as a "run-through" point.

CPR passenger services operated daily through the community from 1889 until they passed to Via Rail Canada in 1978; its primary train, The Atlantic Limited, was renamed to the Atlantic at that time. Under Via, the Atlantic operated until it was discontinued in 1981, only to be resurrected in 1985. The train passed through St. Croix daily until it was cut back to three days per week in 1990 and then permanently discontinued in 1994.

In 1988, CP Rail placed all of its lines east of Montreal—including the mainline through St. Croix and Vanceboro—under a separate business unit called the Canadian Atlantic Railway. The line was sold in 1995 to J.D. Irving Limited and it is operated by subsidiary, the New Brunswick Southern Railway.

=== 1915 sabotage attempt ===
During World War I, the CPR line became infamous for being the sabotage target of a German Army officer. The United States was still a neutral country at that point, and CPR was not permitted to transport war materiel and troops across U.S. soil on the way to Saint John (most war goods were transported within Canada on the government-owned Intercolonial Railway using an all-Canadian routing instead). However, Imperial Germany was convinced that CPR's route across Maine was being used for the war effort and sought to destroy the Saint Croix–Vanceboro Railway Bridge crossing the St. Croix River. The officer travelled to Vanceboro and stayed in the local hotel, then laid explosives which detonated but did not damage the bridge. He was arrested and then jailed by the United States and then Canada.

== See also ==
- List of communities in New Brunswick
