= Olamon, Maine =

- Village
- Location within Maine
- Coordinates: 45°07′15″N 68°36′38″W
- Country: United States
- State: Maine
- County: Penobscot
- Elevation: 131 ft (40 m)
- Time zone: UTC-5 (Eastern (EST))
  - Summer (DST): UTC-4 (EDT)
- Area code: 207
- GNIS feature ID: 572676

Olamon is an unincorporated village in the town of Greenbush, Penobscot County, Maine, United States. The community is located along U.S. Route 2, 23.5 miles (37.8 km) north-northeast of Bangor. Olamon had a post office until March 15, 2008.
