= Mantua, Nova Scotia =

Mantua
- Etymology: the English form of the name of the city in Italy whose Italian name is Mantova.
- Interactive map of Mantua
- Coordinates: 45.003231°N 64.045197°W
- Country: Canada
- Province: Nova Scotia
- County: Hants
- Municipal district: West Hants, Nova Scotia, Canada

Mantua (/ˈmæn.ə.weɪ/MAN-ə-way) is an unincorporated community in the Canadian province of Nova Scotia, located in West Hants Regional Municipality. The 45th parallel – halfway between the equator and North Pole – passes through Mantua.

== Transportation ==
Mantua can be reached by road.

Mantua was formerly served by the Dominion Atlantic Railway.

Mantua is located west of the Meander River.

== Fossils ==
Pine fossils have been found in Mantua.
