= Mattawamkeag (CDP), Maine =

Mattawamkeag, Maine
- Census-designated place
- Location within Maine Location within the United States
- Coordinates: 45°29′59″N 68°21′11″W
- Country: United States
- State: Maine
- County: Penobscot
- Town: Mattawamkeag

Area
  - Total: 2.91 sq mi (7.53 km^{2})
  - Land: 2.84 sq mi (7.35 km^{2})
  - Water: 0.069 sq mi (0.18 km^{2})
- Elevation: 213 ft (65 m)

Population (2020)
  - Total: 422
  - Density: 148.7/sq mi (57.41/km^{2})
- Time zone: UTC-5 (Eastern (EST))
  - Summer (DST): UTC-4 (EDT)
- ZIP Code: 04459
- Area code: 207
- FIPS code: 23-44235
- GNIS feature ID: 2806286

Mattawamkeag is a census-designated place (CDP) and the primary village in the town of Mattawamkeag, Penobscot County, Maine, United States. It is in the southwestern corner of the town, where the Mattawamkeag River joins the Penobscot. The community is bordered to the south by the town of Winn and to the west, across the Penobscot, by the town of Woodville.

U.S. Route 2 passes through Mattawamkeag, leading southwest 60 miles (97 km) to Bangor and northeast 65 miles (105 km) to Houlton. Maine State Route 157 leads northwest from Mattawamkeag 14 miles (23 km) to East Millinocket.

Mattawamkeag was first listed as a CDP prior to the 2020 census.

== Demographics ==
Historical population
Census	Pop.	Note	%±
2020	422		—
U.S. Decennial Census
