= New Brunswick Southern Railway =

Canadian short line railway

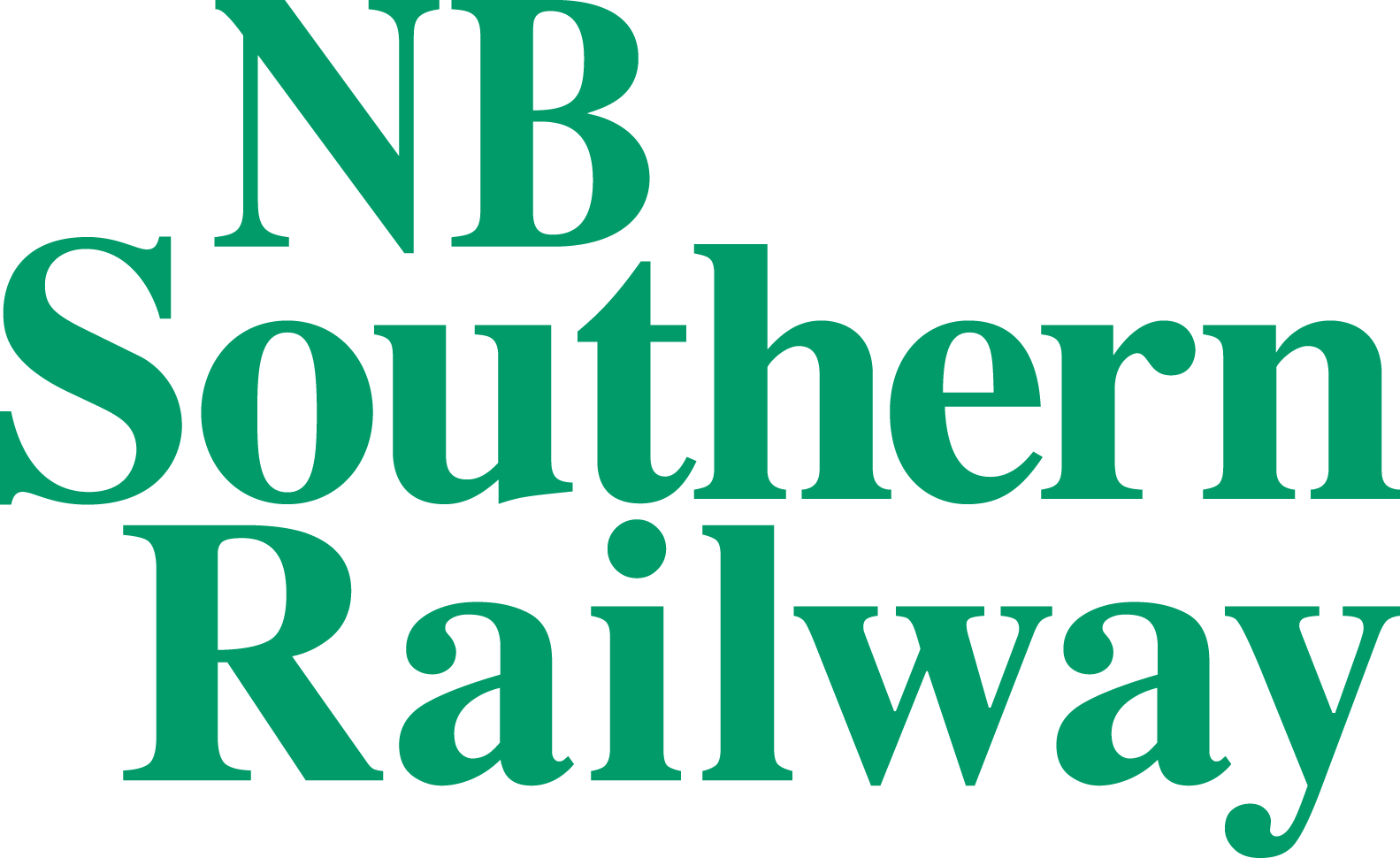

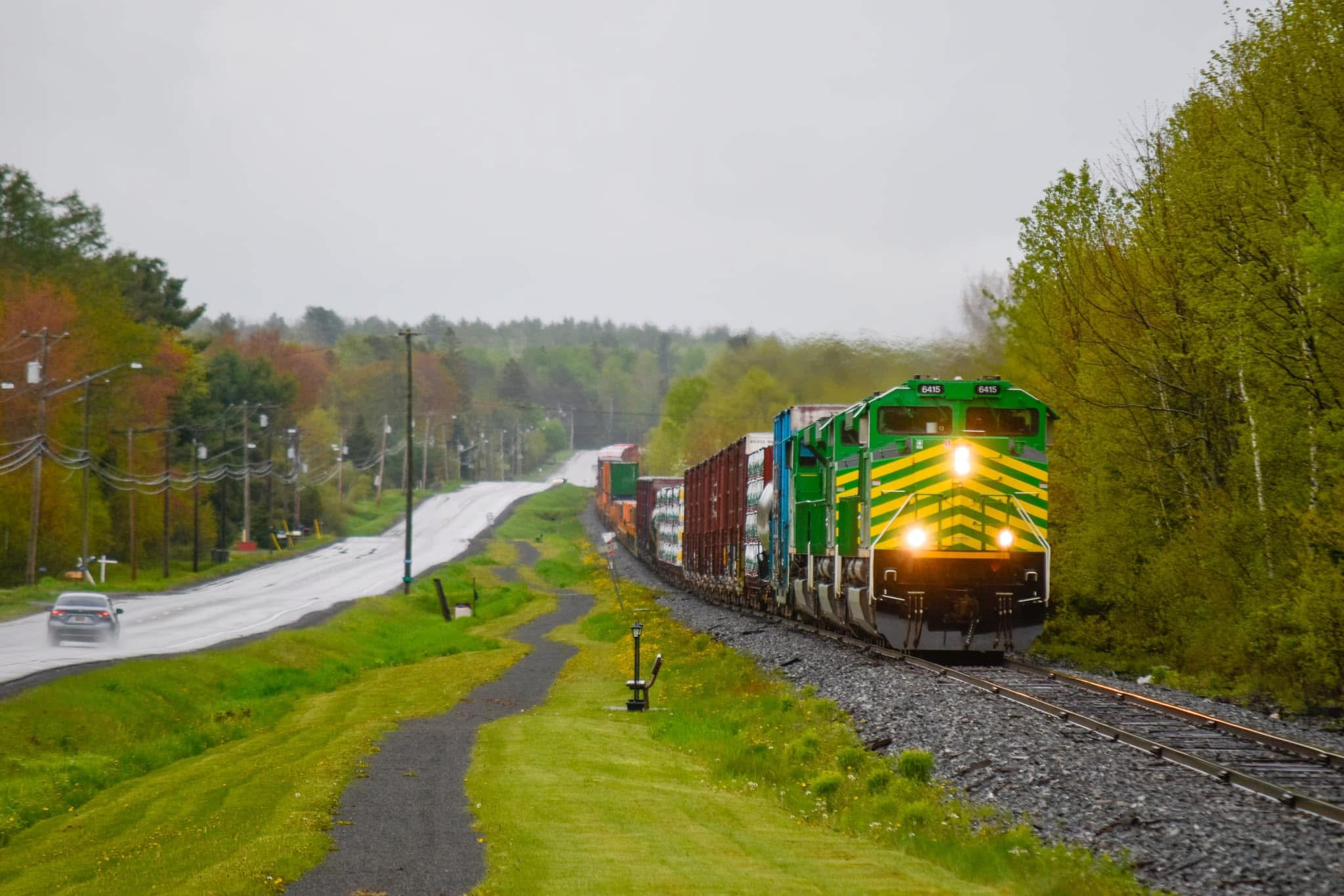
- Three EMD SD70M-2 locomotives lead a westbound NBSR Train at Tracy, New Brunswick.

Overview
- Headquarters: Saint John, NB
- Reporting mark: NBSR
- Locale: New Brunswick, Maine
- Dates of operation: 1995–

Technical
- Track gauge: 4 ft 8 1/2 in (1,435 mm) standard gauge

The New Brunswick Southern Railway Company Limited (reporting mark NBSR) is a 131.7 mi (212.0 km) Canadian short line railway owned by the New Brunswick Railway Company Limited, a holding company that is part of "Irving Transportation Services", a division within the industrial conglomerate J. D. Irving.

Irving controls NBSR, its sister company Eastern Maine Railway ((reporting mark EMRY)) and Maine Northern Railway ((reporting mark MNRY), 258-mile (415 km) connecting Millinocket, Maine with Van Buren, Maine), under its umbrella holding corporation NBM Railways.

NBSR and EMRY form a continuous 189.5 mi (305.0 km) main line connecting Saint John, New Brunswick, with Brownville Junction, Maine. NBSR also operates an additional 41.7 mi (67.1 km) of branch lines in New Brunswick.

== History ==
NBSR was incorporated in November 1994 by J. D. Irving Ltd. to purchase 131.7 miles of CPR rail within New Brunswick, as CPR sought to divest its holdings east of Montreal. This purchase included the 84.4 mile McAdam Subdivision, the 5.6 mile section of the Mattawamkeag Subdivision within Canada, as well as the West Saint John Spur, Milltown Spur, and the St. Stephen Subdivision.

The actual land forming the right of way that CPR's tracks were located on was actually already owned by J.D. Irving Ltd. CPR sold all of its land holdings in New Brunswick (but not the tracks and buildings) in 1941 when it reached an agreement that saw industrialist K. C. Irving purchase the New Brunswick Railway Company Limited. This arrangement allowed J.D. Irving Ltd. to use New Brunswick Railway Co. Ltd. as a holding company to own both the NBSR as well as its U.S. sister EMRY. Ownership of the tracks in New Brunswick extends to the Canada–United States border at the midpoints of two crossings of the St. Croix River; these being the Saint Croix–Vanceboro Railway Bridge at St. Croix shared with the EMRY, as well as an unnamed railway bridge at St. Stephen shared with Woodland Rail LLC (operations contracted to EMRY).

Both NBSR and EMRY began operations on January 6, 1995, approximately one week after Canadian Pacific Railway abandoned operations of its Canadian Atlantic Railway (CAR) subsidiary on December 31, 1994. In spring 1995 Irving Transportation Services consolidated its railway operations as Eastern Maine Railway Company Limited came under NBSR operational control and NBSR trains and crews operate over both short lines in a seamless operation.

== Route ==
Main line

NBSR's main line begins at Mile 0 of the McAdam Subdivision at Mill Street in Saint John, extending 84.4 miles to the yard at McAdam. This trackage continues another 5.6 miles on the Mattawamkeag Subdivision from McAdam to the International Boundary at the Saint Croix–Vanceboro Railway Bridge where it continues into the United States as the EMRY. East of Mill Street are the tracks of CN with which the NBSR interchanges daily.

The tracks between Saint John and St. Croix were built as part of the European and North American Railway's "Western Extension" which was part of a project that connected Saint John, New Brunswick with Bangor, Maine, opening in 1869. This line ended up becoming part of the New Brunswick Railway in 1883 and in turn part of the Canadian Pacific Railway in 1890.

One distinctive section of NBSR's main line is its crossing over the Saint John River approximately 1 mi (1.6 km) west of Mill Street where it crosses the Reversing Falls gorge on the Reversing Falls Railway Bridge. The current bridge structure dates to 1922.

Branch lines

NBSR has three branch lines:

- West Saint John Spur, running approximately 3.2 mi (5.1 km) from the main line at Fairville in the western part of the city of Saint John. The West Saint John Spur serves the west side of the Port of Saint John, including the Rodney Container Terminal, the Forest Products Terminal (FORTERM), and several industrial customers. The tracks forming the West Saint John Spur were built as the Carleton, City of Saint John Branch Railroad in the early 1870s and acquired by CPR in the 1890s.
- St. Stephen Subdivision, running approximately 33.9 mi (54.6 km) from the main line at McAdam to the town of St. Stephen. The tracks between McAdam and St. Stephen were built as part of both the St. Andrews & Quebec Railway, New Brunswick & Canada Railway and the Grand Southern Railway; all were acquired by NBR or CPR at various times through to 1911.
- Milltown Spur, running approximately 4.6 mi (7.4 km) from the St. Stephen Subdivision in the town of St. Stephen and loops around the town to end at the halfway point of an unnamed railway bridge over the St. Croix River at the International Boundary. The other half of this bridge is owned by Woodland Rail LLC which owns a small portion of a former Maine Central Railroad line from Calais, Maine to Woodland, Maine; this line is a remnant of the Calais Branch and is landlocked from the rest of the United States rail network and only connects to NBSR's Milltown Spur for interchange. NBSRs sister company, Eastern Maine Railway, is contracted by Woodland Rail LLC to operate this line between Calais and Woodland.

Interchange points

NBSR directly interchanges with other railways at the following locations:

- St. Stephen, NB, with Woodland Rail LLC (reporting mark ?) (operated by EMRY)
- Saint John, NB, with Canadian National Railway (reporting mark CN)

Through its sister company Eastern Maine Railway (reporting mark EMRY), NBSR also interchanges at the following locations:

- Mattawamkeag, ME, with CSX Transportation (reporting mark CSXT)
- Brownville Junction, ME, with Canadian Pacific Railway (reporting mark CP)

Yards

NBSR operates three yards:

- Dever Road Yard (Lancaster, NB - western part of the city of Saint John) - former CP yard owned and operated by NBSR
- McAdam Yard (McAdam, NB) - former CP yard owned and operated by NBSR
- Island Yard (Saint John, NB) - owned by CN but operated by NBSR under contract

In 2002 NBSR entered into a 10-year agreement with CN that saw NBSR extend its operations onto CN's industrial trackage in the east end of Saint John including the Island Yard in exchange for J.D. Irving Ltd directing a certain portion of rail traffic from its various subsidiary companies onto CN's network. This agreement was in response to the bankruptcy of Canadian American Railroad (reporting mark CDAC) and the possibility of the direct link from Saint John to Montreal being severed beyond Brownville Junction.

== See also ==
- NBM Railways
