= St. Andrews and Quebec Railway =

The St. Andrews and Quebec Railway was a stillborn railway which was originally proposed in 1832 by Henry Fairlairn in the United States Journal. Fairlairn saw advantages in year-round transportation of troops and supplies, since at the time, the St. Lawrence River was treacherous or even completely frozen during several winter months. Uncertainty regarding the true border between New Brunswick and Maine did nothing to help the plan, as it was not until the Webster–Ashburton Treaty of 1842 that the contention was relieved. The railway was at the centre of Dow v Black, which in the 1870s was one of the first major cases examining in detail the division of powers between the Canadian federal Parliament and the provincial Legislatures according to the then-new British North America Act 1867. The SA&Q railway eventually was superseded by the Intercolonial Railway.

== Bibliography ==
- MacMillan, Gail (1978). An Outline of the History of Bathurst. Sackville, NB: The Tribune Press.
