= Mattawamkeag, Maine =

Town in Maine, United States

- Town
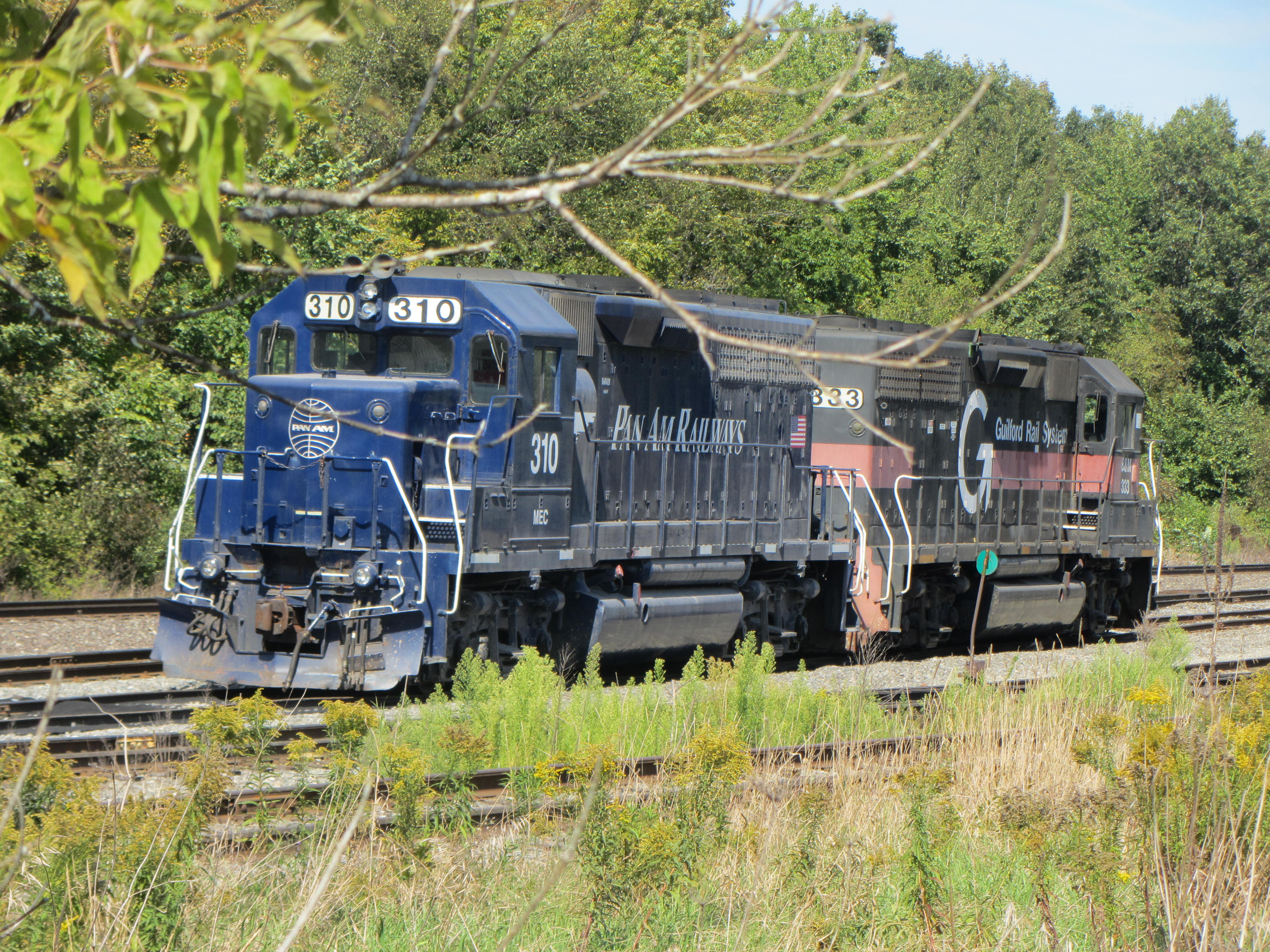
- Pan Am Railways, Mattawamkeag, Maine
- Motto: "Where Two Rivers Meet"
- Location within Maine Location within the United States
- Coordinates: 45°32′05″N 68°18′34″W
- Country: United States
- State: Maine
- County: Penobscot
- Incorporated: 1860

Area
  - Total: 38.04 sq mi (98.52 km^{2})
  - Land: 37.73 sq mi (97.72 km^{2})
  - Water: 0.31 sq mi (0.80 km^{2})
- Elevation: 397 ft (121 m)

Population (2020)
  - Total: 596
  - Density: 16/sq mi (6.1/km^{2})
- Time zone: UTC-5 (Eastern (EST))
  - Summer (DST): UTC-4 (EDT)
- ZIP code: 04459
- Area code: 207
- FIPS code: 23-44270
- GNIS feature ID: 582585

Mattawamkeag is a town in Penobscot County, Maine, United States, located where the Mattawamkeag River joins the Penobscot River. The population was 596 at the 2020 census. The village of Mattawamkeag is in the southwestern part of the town.

== Railroad history ==
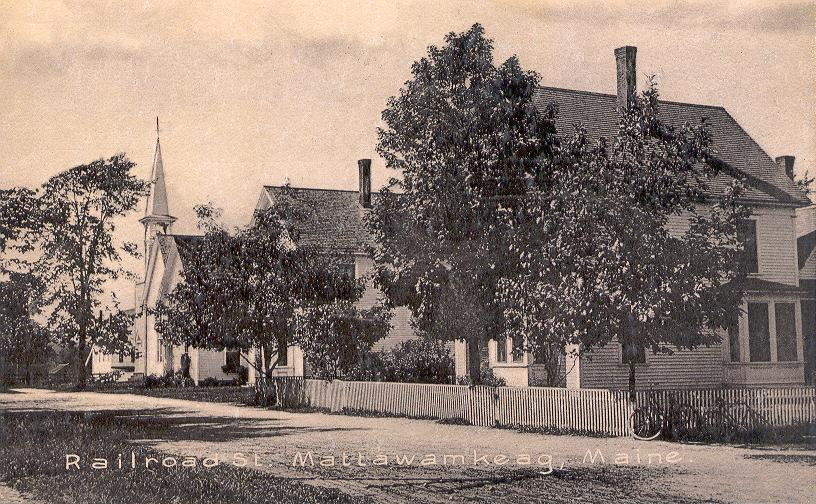
Railroad Street c. 1910

Mattawamkeag's history is inextricably linked to the railroad. The European & North American Railway built a track up the Penobscot River valley from Bangor and reached Mattawamkeag in 1869. By October 1871, the line was completed from Mattawamkeag to Vanceboro, where it connected through to Saint John, New Brunswick, Canada. The Maine Central Railroad leased the Bangor-Vanceboro E&NA in 1882 and purchased it in 1955.

In 1889, the International Railway of Maine was completed between Megantic, Quebec, and Mattawamkeag, where it interchanged with the Maine Central. The parent company of the International Railway, Canadian Pacific, obtained running rights from Maine Central for Mattawamkeag to Vanceboro, where it regained CPR trackage in New Brunswick. This placed Mattawamkeag on the transcontinental mainline of the Canadian Pacific, running from Saint John to Vancouver, British Columbia. In 1974, CPR purchased the Mattawamkeag-Vanceboro railway tracks from Maine Central. In 1988, CPR transferred trackage east of Megantic to its subsidiary Canadian Atlantic Railway. In 1994, Canadian Atlantic was sold, with the line running through Mattawamkeag being purchased by J. D. Irving, and is now operated as the Eastern Maine Railway.

Maine Central was purchased by Guilford Transportation Industries in 1981 and became part of Guilford Rail System, since renamed Pan Am Railways. Pan Am now operates as a subsidiary of the larger CSX Transportation network, and is both the northernmost and easternmost point on the CSX Transportation network.

== Historic building ==
The George W. Smith Homestead (1874) in Mattawamkeag is listed on the National Register of Historic Places.

== Geography ==
According to the United States Census Bureau, the town has a total area of 38.04 square miles (98.52 km^{2}), of which 37.73 square miles (97.72 km^{2}) is land and 0.31 square miles (0.80 km^{2}) is water.

== Demographics ==
Historical population
Census	Pop.	Note	%±
1820	7		—
1830	16		128.6%
1860	280		—
1870	356		27.1%
1880	456		28.1%
1890	633		38.8%
1900	527		−16.7%
1910	517		−1.9%
1920	553		7.0%
1930	461		−16.6%
1940	843		82.9%
1950	803		−4.7%
1960	945		17.7%
1970	988		4.6%
1980	1,000		1.2%
1990	830		−17.0%
2000	825		−0.6%
2010	687		−16.7%
2020	596		−13.2%
U.S. Decennial Census

=== 2010 census ===
As of the census of 2010, there were 687 people, 317 households, and 197 families living in the town. The population density was 18.2 inhabitants per square mile (7.0/km^{2}). There were 407 housing units at an average density of 10.8 per square mile (4.2/km^{2}). The racial makeup of the town was 98.0% White, 0.1% African American, 0.9% Native American, 0.1% Asian, 0.1% from other races, and 0.7% from two or more races. Hispanic or Latino of any race were 0.6% of the population.

There were 317 households, of which 20.2% had children under the age of 18 living with them, 47.6% were married couples living together, 8.8% had a female householder with no husband present, 5.7% had a male householder with no wife present, and 37.9% were non-families. 31.5% of all households were made up of individuals, and 12.9% had someone living alone who was 65 years of age or older. The average household size was 2.17 and the average family size was 2.66.

The median age in the town was 50.4 years. 15.1% of residents were under the age of 18; 5.9% were between the ages of 18 and 24; 18% were from 25 to 44; 41.5% were from 45 to 64; and 19.5% were 65 years of age or older. The gender makeup of the town was 50.9% male and 49.1% female.

=== 2000 census ===
As of the census of 2000, there were 825 people, 338 households, and 234 families living in the town. The population density was 22.0 inhabitants per square mile (8.5/km^{2}). There were 393 housing units at an average density of 10.5 per square mile (4.1/km^{2}). The racial makeup of the town was 98.06% White, 0.36% Native American, and 1.58% from two or more races. Hispanic or Latino of any race were 0.12% of the population.

There were 338 households, out of which 31.1% had children under the age of 18 living with them, 58.0% were married couples living together, 7.4% had a female householder with no husband present, and 30.5% were non-families. 26.9% of all households were made up of individuals, and 13.9% had someone living alone who was 65 years of age or older. The average household size was 2.44 and the average family size was 2.96.

In the town, the population was spread out, with 25.2% under the age of 18, 5.1% from 18 to 24, 28.0% from 25 to 44, 24.6% from 45 to 64, and 17.1% who were 65 years of age or older. The median age was 40 years. For every 100 females, there were 95.5 males. For every 100 females age 18 and over, there were 95.3 males.

The median income for a household in the town was $23,403, and the median income for a family was $32,000. Males had a median income of $27,857 versus $19,063 for females. The per capita income for the town was $12,573. About 7.8% of families and 12.9% of the population were below the poverty line, including 12.3% of those under age 18 and 12.0% of those age 65 or over.

== Notable people ==
- Mary F. Cahill, state legislator
- Steve Clifford, professional basketball coach
