= European and North American Railway =

Railway companies in New Brunswick and Maine

Overview
- Locale: southern New Brunswick, southeastern Maine
- Dates of operation: 1857–1872

Technical
- Track gauge: 4 ft 8 1/2 in (1,435 mm) standard gauge
- Previous gauge: built to 5 ft 6 in (1,676 mm) but converted in 1870s

The European and North American Railway (E&NA) is the name for three historic Canadian and American railways which were built in New Brunswick and Maine.

The idea of the E&NA as a single system was conceived at a railway conference in Portland, Maine in 1850 by railroad entrepreneur John A. Poor. The line was intended to link Portland (the eastern terminus of the US rail network) with an ice-free Atlantic port in Nova Scotia to connect with fast trans-Atlantic ships from Europe; the port at Halifax was discussed as a possible eastern terminus for the line, as was Canso.

The concept was also discussed throughout the early 1850s in New Brunswick, Nova Scotia, and Maine as a means to connect the British colonies with the railway network of the United Province of Canada. Poor himself was also promoting a connection from Portland to Richmond and built the St. Lawrence and Atlantic Railroad (SL&A), opening in 1853, the same year it was purchased by Grand Trunk. Poor stood to benefit from a dual flow of traffic from the Maritimes to New England and the Maritimes to the Canadas.

== E&NA "Eastern Extension" (Saint John to Shediac) ==
The railway most commonly referred to as the E&NA in Canada was built between Saint John and Shediac, New Brunswick as a segment of Poor's vision of a Portland-Nova Scotia line.

The initial ownership of the line is unclear, however the European and North American Railway was incorporated in New Brunswick on March 15, 1851, following the Portland conference, with the intention being to start construction east toward Nova Scotia. Both Saint John, and St. Andrews, New Brunswick were vying for the E&NA to begin in their respective communities; however Saint John managed to convince the company to begin on the east side of the Saint John River.

Saint John also convinced the company to forego plans to build into Nova Scotia by concentrating on reaching the Northumberland Strait first. This would give the city a steamship connection through the Gulf of St. Lawrence to Canada East, as well as allowing coal and other goods to avoid the circuitous and hazardous transit around Nova Scotia.

Construction started in 1853, heading northeast from Saint John up the Kennebecasis River valley. Unfortunately construction did not proceed very far and the company went bankrupt in 1856 with the colonial government of New Brunswick taking over the company's line in 1857.

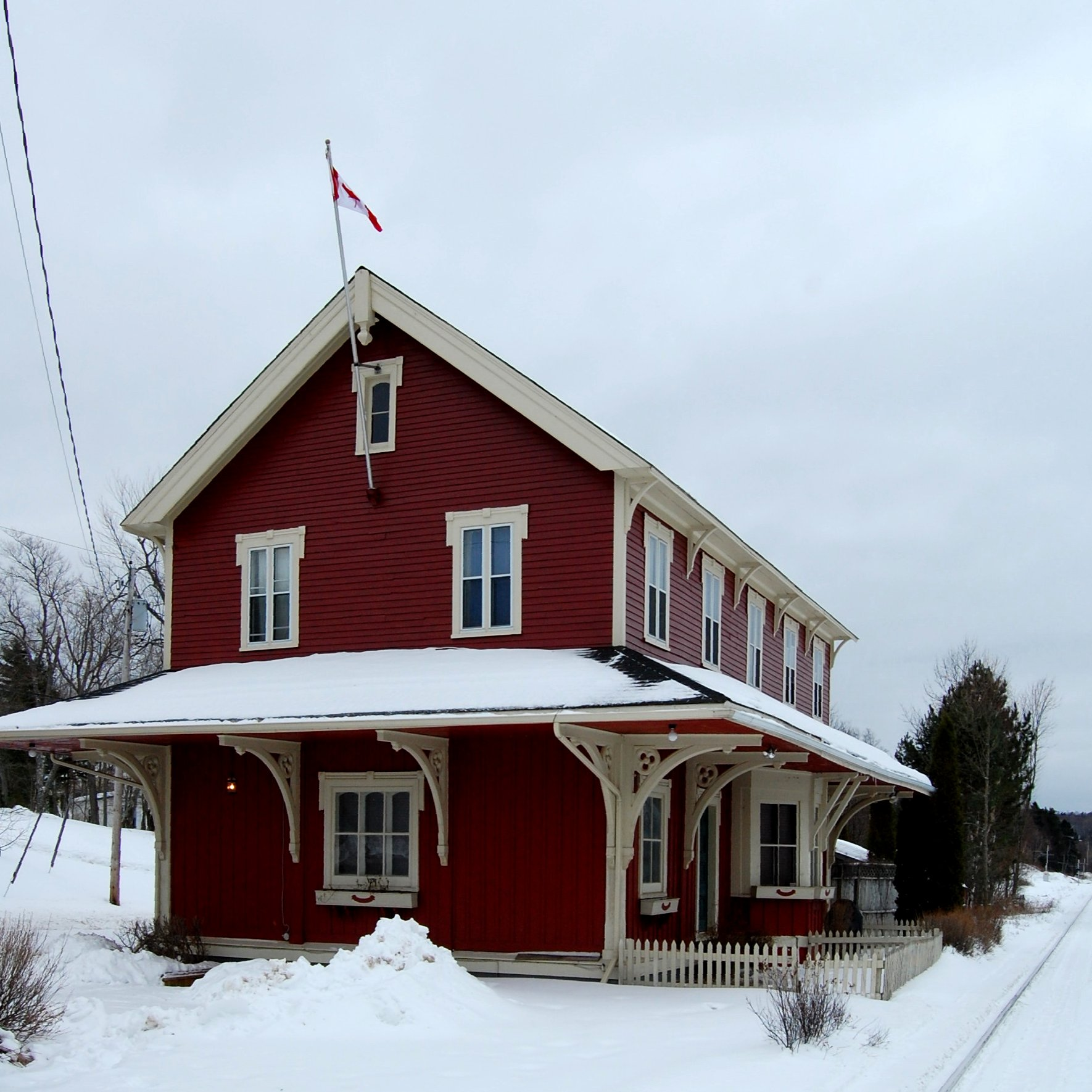
The Rothesay railway station was originally known as Kennebecasis Station when completed on the E&NA line at Rothesay in 1860. It is one of the oldest stations still in existence in Canada.

That year (1857) saw construction proceed apace under a newly reincorporated government-owned European and North American Railway Co. Canada's first civil engineering graduate, H.G.C. Ketchum, of the University of New Brunswick, was employed in the surveying and construction of the line. Ketchum surveyed a high-capacity railway with long tangent sections and minimal grades between Saint John and Moncton.

The first section of the E&NA opened between Shediac and Moncton on August 20, 1857, a distance of 16.8 miles (27.0 km). Although the Shediac-Moncton section was the first part opened, the line was soon extended 2 miles east to the better wharf facilities at Point du Chene. The line had been surveyed to extend from Cape Brule 2 miles further east of Point du Chene, however the sheltered harbour at Point du Chene won out over the more exposed Cape Brule location.

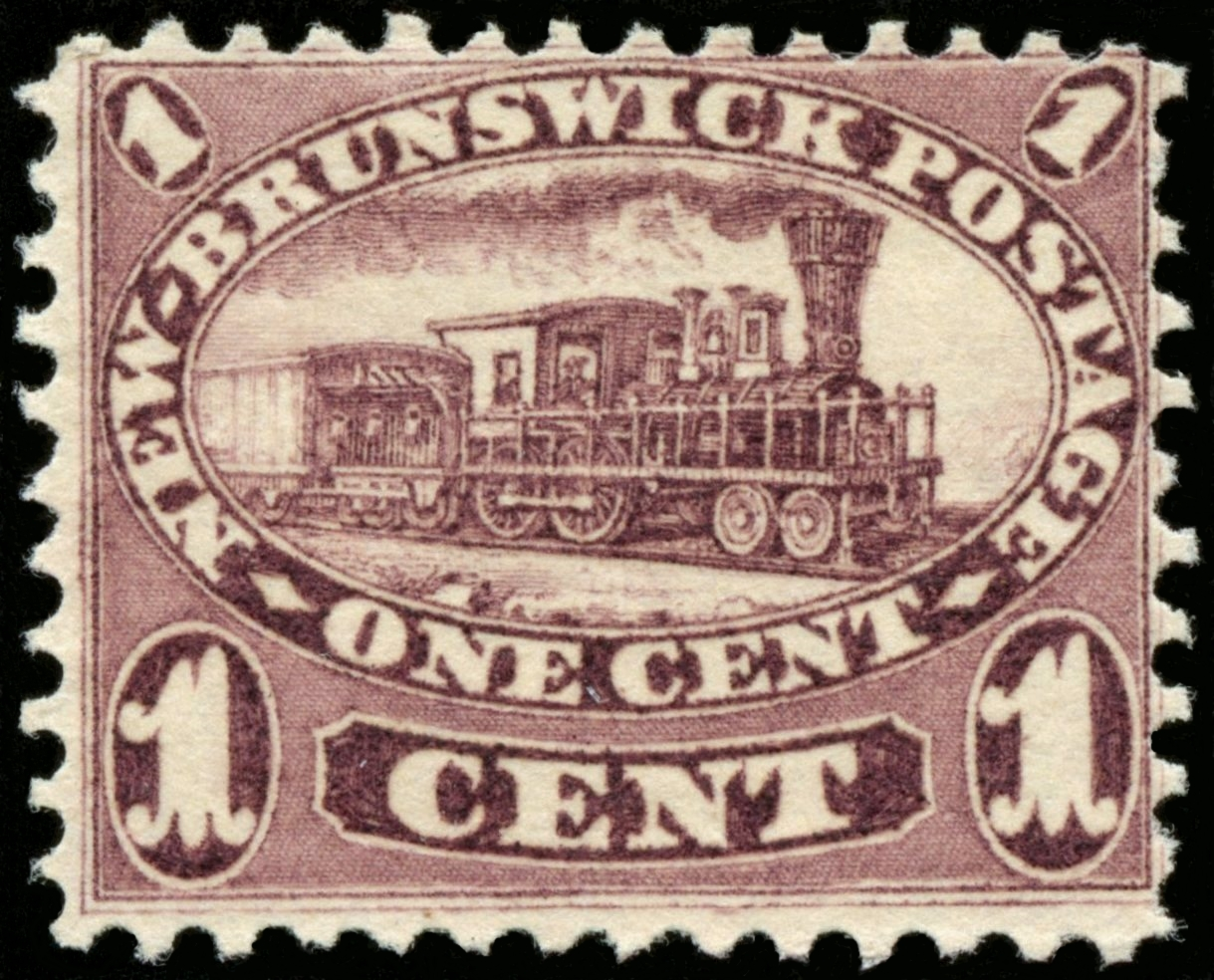
1860 New Brunswick stamp showing an E&NA engine, the first ever depicted in a postage stamp

Meanwhile, the line between Hampton, New Brunswick and Saint John opened in 1859 and the remaining section between Moncton and Hampton was opened in 1860. In 1860, the colony of New Brunswick issued a postage stamp which illustrated an E&NA engine. The stamp was commissioned by the postmaster and one of the railway's directors, Charles Connell.

Unfortunately, the E&NA never progressed east from Moncton to its stated goal of Nova Scotia. However, the extension to the Northumberland Strait provided an important link to Prince Edward Island (via ferry) and an alternate route to Lower Canada. By the late 1850s, the Nova Scotia Railway had already built a line from Halifax to Truro, Nova Scotia, with a stated ambition of building westward to link with the E&NA in New Brunswick; thus the E&NA stood with its Saint John-Shediac line for several years. The missing link between Truro and Moncton was finally built by the Intercolonial Railway, completed in 1872.

The E&NA's "Eastern Extension" locomotive shops and headquarters were located in Shediac until it was taken over by the Intercolonial Railway, which moved them to Moncton.

== E&NA "Western Extension" (South Bay to St. Croix, New Brunswick) ==
Less well-known was the railway most commonly referred to as the E&NA Western Extension which was built between South Bay, New Brunswick (immediately west of Saint John) and St. Croix on the International Boundary with Maine.

On April 13, 1864, the colonial government in New Brunswick incorporated a company called the European and North American Railway for extension from Saint John westward to build the "Western Extension" of the E&NA system. The 90-mile railway was surveyed later that year and a contract for construction was awarded to E.R. Burpee. On November 9, 1865, the first sod was turned at South Bay by the mayor of Saint John. By August 14, 1869, the line was opened between South Bay and Hartts Mills (later renamed Fredericton Junction). On November 17, 1869, the line was completely opened from the Maine border at St. Croix east to Saint John.

== E&NA "Maine" (Bangor to Vanceboro) ==
The E&NA incorporated in the State of Maine as the European and North American Railway on August 20, 1850. Subsequent delays over the next 15 years saw its charter revised to run from Bangor to Vanceboro, Maine on the International Boundary opposite St. Croix, New Brunswick.

Construction finally began with the section from Bangor to Olamon, Maine, opening in 1868 and Olamon to Mattawamkeag, Maine, opening in 1869. The 114 mile line was finally completed to Vanceboro in October 1871, linking the E&NA (Maine) to the E&NA (Western Extension) at Vanceboro-St. Croix. A ceremony celebrating completion of the line was attended by U.S. President Ulysses S. Grant and Canadian Governor General Lord Lisgar at the boundary bridge crossing the St. Croix River.

== Consolidation ==
On November 9, 1872, the Eastern Division was consolidated, along with the Nova Scotia Railway, into the Intercolonial Railway. On the other hand, the Maine and Western companies were merged on December 1, 1872, as the Consolidated European and North American Railway, which defaulted on its bonds in 1875. The Western Extension bondholders organized the St. John and Maine Railway on March 29, 1878, and acquired the property in New Brunswick on August 31. The New Brunswick Railway leased this line on July 1, 1883. The Maine property was similarly reorganized under its original name - European and North American Railway - in October 1880. The Maine Central Railroad leased this line on April 1, 1882.

== Synopsis of Portland-Halifax railway line ==
Although the entire Portland to Halifax line that was envisioned at the Portland conference in 1850 was not built by the E&NA per se, several portions of this system were completed by other companies as follows:

- The Richmond (Halifax) to Truro section was built between 1854 and 1858 by the Nova Scotia Railway.
- Moncton to Truro was built between 1868 and 1872 by the Intercolonial Railway.
- Portland to Bangor was built between 1845 and 1850 by the Androscoggin and Kennebec Railroad and Penobscot and Kennebec Railroad, both of which merged to form the Maine Central Railroad in 1862.

An express passenger train known as the Gull was jointly operated over this route by the various owners from 1930 to 1960.

== Subsequent disposition of Portland-Halifax railway line ==
Although the Portland to Halifax railway line remains in operation, various sections of the line have undergone several corporate changes over the years:

=== Halifax-Saint John ===
The Intercolonial Railway (ICR) took over the Nova Scotia Railway and E&NA "Eastern Extension" on November 9, 1872, following completion of its connection between Truro and Moncton. The E&NA "Eastern Extension" was standard gauged on November 11, 1872.

The Intercolonial Railway came under the control of the Canadian Government Railways (CGR) in 1915. CGR was merged into the Canadian National Railways (CNR) in 1918. CN continues to operate these lines, although the Shediac spur has been cut back to Scoudouc, New Brunswick, but is no longer in operational use east of Painsec Junction, where the original ICR line branches off to the south of the original E&NA.

=== Saint John-St. Croix ===
The E&NA "Western Extension" was operated by the New Brunswick government separately from the E&NA "Eastern Extension" and thus did not get included in the takeover by the Intercolonial Railway, which was focused exclusively on building and operating a railway from Halifax to Quebec. The E&NA "Western Extension" was standard gauged by 1877.

The E&NA "Western Extension" became part of the New Brunswick Railway (NBR) in 1883. On July 1, 1890, the Canadian Pacific Railway (CPR) secured a lease for 999 years for the NBR. CPR applied to abandon the line effective January 1, 1995, however it was subsequently taken over by New Brunswick Southern Railway which continues to operate the line today.

=== Vanceboro-Bangor ===
The E&NA "Maine" was operated separately from its completion in 1871 until it was leased to the Maine Central Railroad (MEC) in 1882. In 1889 the International Railway of Maine was built by Canadian Pacific Railway from Megantic, Quebec to the MEC at Mattawamkeag, Maine The MEC granted trackage rights to the CPR over the 56 mile section from Mattawamkeag to Vanceboro at that time.

In November 1955, MEC purchased the entire 114 mile E&NA "Maine" for US$125 per share or US$3,114,500 payable in cash or bonds. On December 17, 1974, the CPR purchased the 56 mile Mattawamkeag to Vanceboro section from MEC for US$5.4 million, although MEC maintained trackage rights. MEC maintained ownership of the 58 mile Bangor to Mattawamkeag section. In 1981, MEC was purchased by Guilford Rail System, which continues to operate the Bangor to Mattawamkeag section.

CPR applied to abandon the Mattawamkeag-Vanceboro section effective January 1, 1995, however it was subsequently taken over by Eastern Maine Railway which continues to operate the line.

=== Portland-Bangor ===
The Maine Central was created in 1862 and was sold to Guilford Rail System (GRS) in 1981. GRS continues to operate the line as of 2005.
