= St. Croix River (Maine–New Brunswick) =

River forming part of the US–Canada border

St. Croix River: Fleuve Sainte-Croix; Skutik
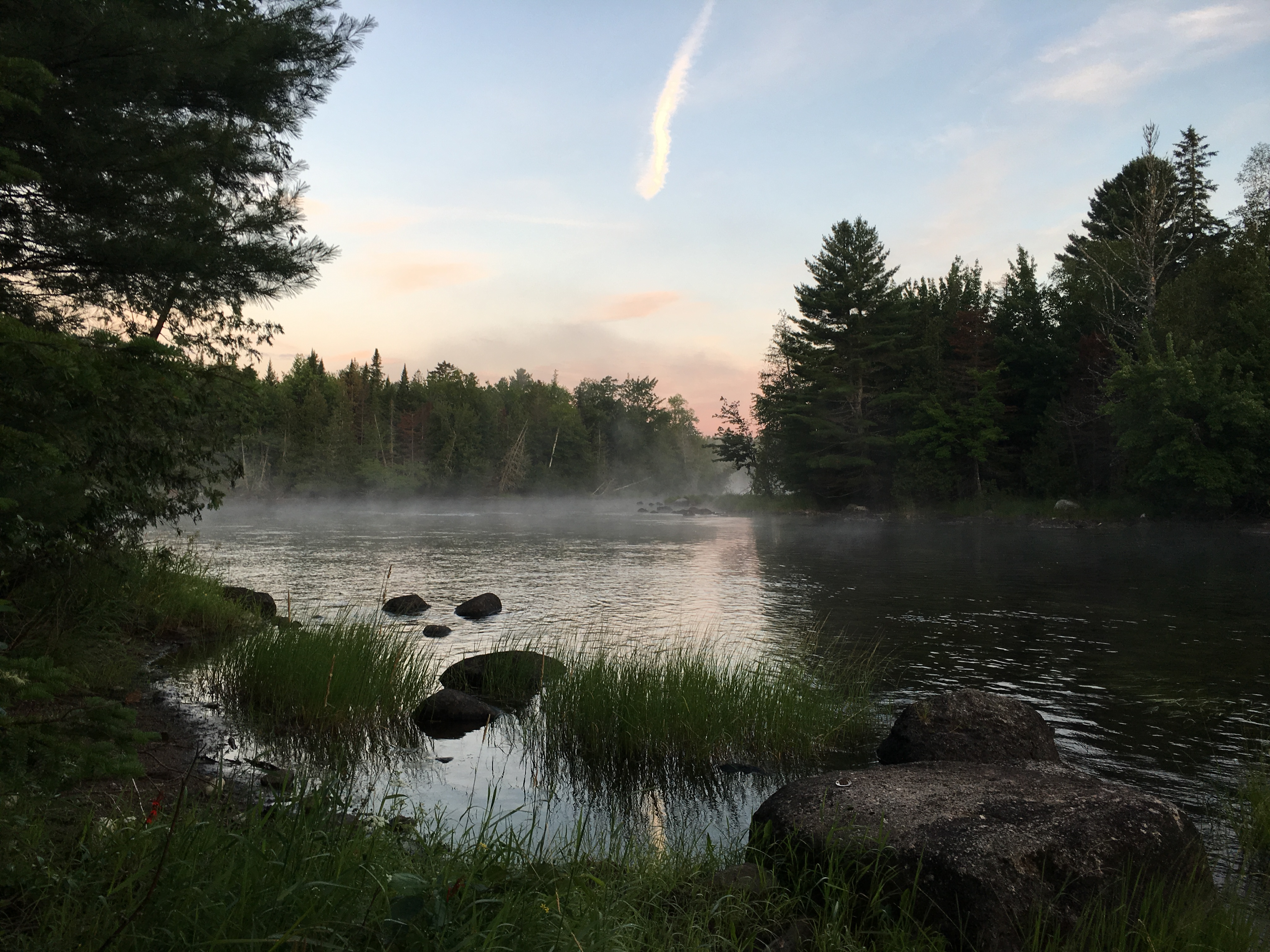
- St. Croix River at Vanceboro, Maine.

Location
- Country: Canada/United States

Physical characteristics
- Source
  - location: Chiputneticook Lakes
- Mouth
  - location: Passamaquoddy Bay
  - coordinates: 45°04′23″N 67°05′35″W
  - elevation: sea level
- Basin size: 1,500 mi^{2} (3,900 km^{2})

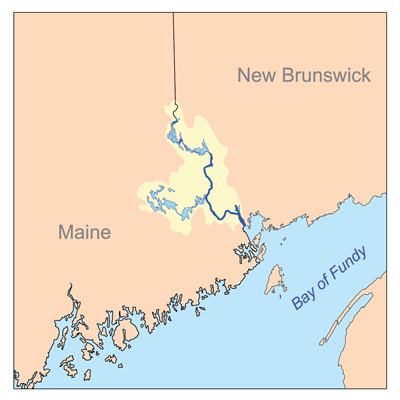
The St. Croix River watershed

The St. Croix River (French: Fleuve Sainte-Croix; Maliseet-Passamaquoddy: Skutik) is a river in northeastern North America, 71 miles (114 km) in length, that forms part of the Canada–United States border between Maine (U.S.) and New Brunswick (Canada). The river rises in the Chiputneticook Lakes and flows south and southeast, between Calais and St. Stephen. It discharges into Passamaquoddy Bay, in the Bay of Fundy.

== Geography ==
The river forms from the Chiputneticook Lakes (North Lake, East Grand Lake, Mud Lake, and Spednic Lake) along the Canadian–U.S. border. U.S. Geological Survey topographic maps show the St. Croix River as beginning at the 1.0-mile-long (1.6 km) outlet stream from East Grand Lake, then flowing through the short Mud Lake and entering Spednic Lake, extending 20 miles (32 km) to its outlet at Vanceboro, Maine, and the start of the river proper. Adding the section of river and lake from the outlet of East Grand Lake gives a total length of 95 miles (153 km) to the St. Croix.

The total drainage area of the river is approximately 1,500 square miles (3,900 km^{2}). In the 20th century, the river was heavily developed for hydroelectric power. The river had previously hosted a large population of Atlantic salmon; however, the salmon population was reduced after building hydroelectric dams upriver from Calais-St. Stephen.

The river is an estuary between Calais-St. Stephen and the river's mouth at Robbinston and Saint Andrews. This tidal area extends for approximately 16 miles (26 km) along this section and exhibits a tidal bore.

=== Navigation ===
The Saint Croix River was an early trade corridor to interior Maine and New Brunswick from the Atlantic coast. Ocean ships could navigate upstream to Calais and St. Stephen; although tidal fluctuation made Eastport a preferred port for deeper draft vessels. The river upstream of Calais and St. Stephen became an important transportation corridor for log driving to bring wooden logs and pulpwood from interior forests to sawmills and paper mills built to use water power at Calais and Woodland.

== Historical boundary issues ==
The boundary issues of the St. Croix River came out of the Treaty of Paris that was signed in 1783. The geography of the river was not charted clearly until the Jay Treaty (1794), which provided provisions for surveying the boundary. The boundary between Maine and New Brunswick north of the headwaters of the Saint Croix took another four decades to establish. Following the War of 1812 there was a push to settle this disputed territory north of the St. Croix on the St. John watershed and it remained in dispute until 1842. During this conflict Maine, Massachusetts and New Brunswick continued to issue some lumbering permits to the disputed territory. With or without a permit, lumbermen were in a race to cut the best timber from the land while it was under dispute. Although it was illegal to cut trees with no permit, the Saint John River enabled this activity because it increased business at the local mills, shipyards and timber ponds in New Brunswick so the officials were slow to halt the ongoing illegal activity.

During this time, the lumbermen were very serious and competitive about the trees. Whoever got to the best trees first claimed them. Dynamite was used as a tool of sabotage to blow up some of the log booms that were strung across the river to catch the recently cut trees. It is also known that at times the timber men purposely sorted their logs incorrectly to attempt to confuse local officials charged with regulating timber trade and transportation.

Prior to 2001, it was possible for boaters to use campsites on both sides of the river. However, boaters must now stay on the same shore that they entered from, and report their trip to the appropriate border agency.

== Water level monitoring ==
=== Canada ===
The Water Survey of Canada maintains six river flow gauges in the St. Croix River watershed:

- St. Croix, New Brunswick (45.5689°N 67.4297°W)
- Baring, Maine (45.1367°N 67.3181°W)
- Dennis Stream near St. Stephen, New Brunswick (45.2097°N 67.2625°W)
- East Grand Lake at Forest City, New Brunswick (45.6650°N 67.7361°W)
- Spednic Lake at St. Croix, New Brunswick (45.5692°N 67.4281°W)
- Forest City Stream, below the Forest City Dam at Forest City, New Brunswick (45.6642°N 67.7344°W)

=== United States ===
The United States Geological Survey maintains two river flow gauges in the St. Croix River watershed.

- Vanceboro, Maine (45°34′08″N 67°25′47″W) where the rivershed is 413 square miles (1,070 km^{2}), 400 feet (100 m) downstream from the Spednik Lake Dam.
- Baring Plantation, Maine (45°34′08″N 67°25′47″W) where the rivershed is 1,374 square miles (3,559 km^{2}), 5.6 miles (9.0 km) downstream of the nearest dam. The maximum recorded flow here is 23,500 cubic feet (670 m^{3}) per second and the minimum 262 cubic feet (7.4 m^{3}) per second.

USGS also maintains a water chemistry monitor at Milltown, Maine (45°10′11″N 67°17′50″W) where the rivershed is 1,455 square miles (3,768 km^{2}). For water year 2001, the pH ranged from 6.6 to 7.2.

== Crossings ==
Seven active international bridges cross the river at the following locations:

- St. Croix, New Brunswick–Vanceboro, Maine (Saint Croix–Vanceboro Bridge, road
- St. Croix–Vanceboro (Saint Croix–Vanceboro Railway Bridge), rail
- Mohannes, New Brunswick–Woodland, Maine (unnamed Maine Central Railroad bridge), rail
- Upper Mills, New Brunswick–Baring, Maine (unnamed Maine Central Railroad bridge), rail
- St. Stephen, New Brunswick–Calais, Maine, International Avenue Bridge, road
- St. Stephen, New Brunswick–Calais, Maine (Milltown International Bridge), road
- St. Stephen, New Brunswick–Calais, Maine (unnamed New Brunswick Southern Railway/Maine Central Railroad bridge), rail
- St. Stephen, New Brunswick–Calais, Maine (St. Stephen–Calais Bridge), road

One defunct crossing exists:

- St. Stephen, New Brunswick–Calais, Maine, ferry (at site of St. Stephen–Calais Bridge)

== Derived names ==
HMCS St. Croix (I81), previously USS McCook (DD-252), became a Canadian ship in 1940 as part of the Destroyers for Bases Agreement. It was renamed after the St. Croix River to follow the Canadian tradition of naming destroyers after Canadian rivers while recognizing the shared national history of the ship.

== Dam removal ==
New Brunswick Power has indicated their desire to remove the 138 year old Milltown Dam on the St Croix River between St. Stephen, New Brunswick (Canada), and Calais, Maine (USA). Currently, New Brunswick Power stakeholders, government officials, the Peskotomuhkati Tribe, locals, and the public are examining this proposed dam removal. Milltown Dam removal would restore Salmon Falls between St. Stephen and Calais. The Peskotomuhkati Tribe is also advocating for the removal of Milltown Dam and the full restoration of Salmon Falls. Milltown Dam was built in 1881 by New Brunswick Power and is the oldest operating hydro facility in Canada. Atlantic Salmon, shad, eels, and alewives would all benefit from this dam's removal and ongoing habitat restoration. St Croix River oxygen levels would also improve with the restoration of Salmon Falls.

== See also ==
- List of bodies of water of New Brunswick
- List of rivers of Maine
