= Vanceboro, Maine =

Town in Maine, United States

- Town
- Location within Maine Location within the United States
- Coordinates: 45°33′40″N 67°29′24″W
- Country: United States
- State: Maine
- County: Washington

Area
  - Total: 22.40 sq mi (58.02 km^{2})
  - Land: 20.14 sq mi (52.16 km^{2})
  - Water: 2.26 sq mi (5.85 km^{2})
- Elevation: 400 ft (120 m)

Population (2020)
  - Total: 102
  - Density: 5.2/sq mi (2/km^{2})
- Time zone: UTC−5 (Eastern (EST))
  - Summer (DST): UTC−4 (EDT)
- ZIP Code: 04491
- Area code: 207
- FIPS code: 23-78675
- GNIS feature ID: 582777

Vanceboro is a town in Washington County, Maine, United States. The town was named after landowner William Vance. The main village in town is located at the eastern terminus of Maine State Route 6. Vanceboro is across the St. Croix River from St. Croix, New Brunswick, Canada, to which it is connected by the Saint Croix–Vanceboro Bridge. Vanceboro is also connected to St. Croix by the Saint Croix–Vanceboro Railway Bridge, which is used by the New Brunswick Southern Railway.

The population was 102 at the 2020 census.

== History ==
Vanceboro was selected as the border crossing for the European and North American Railway (E&NA) between Bangor, Maine, and Saint John, New Brunswick, during surveys in the 1860s.

This line was opened by U.S. President Ulysses S. Grant and Governor General of Canada Lord Lisgar during a ceremony at the border in October 1871. In 1882, the E&NA's rail line from Vanceboro to Bangor was leased by the Maine Central Railroad. In 1889, the MEC's rail line through Vanceboro became part of the transcontinental network of the Canadian Pacific Railway following construction of the International Railway of Maine. In 1955 the MEC purchased the entire line from the E&NA shareholders, and in 1974 the CPR purchased the line through Vanceboro from the MEC. On January 1, 1995, CPR sold the line through Vanceboro to the New Brunswick Southern Railway, which operates as the Eastern Maine Railway in the United States.

On February 2, 1915, Lt. Werner Horn, a German army reservist, bombed the international railway bridge crossing the St. Croix River from Vanceboro into Canada in an unsuccessful attempt to sabotage the CPR line across Maine; it was alleged that the railway was being used to transport war material across the then-neutral United States territory.

== Geography ==
According to the United States Census Bureau, the town has a total area of 22.40 square miles (58.02 km^{2}), of which 20.14 square miles (52.16 km^{2}) is land and 2.26 square miles (5.85 km^{2}) is water.

=== Climate ===
This climatic region is typified by large seasonal temperature differences, with warm to hot (and often humid) summers and cold (sometimes severely cold) winters. According to the Köppen climate classification system, Vanceboro has a humid continental climate, abbreviated "Dfb" on climate maps.

Climate data for Vanceboro, Maine, 1991–2020 normals, extremes 1902–2008
Month	Jan	Feb	Mar	Apr	May	Jun	Jul	Aug	Sep	Oct	Nov	Dec	Year
Record high °F (°C)	57 (14)	66 (19)	75 (24)	88 (31)	97 (36)	97 (36)	96 (36)	98 (37)	96 (36)	86 (30)	72 (22)	61 (16)	98 (37)
Mean daily maximum °F (°C)	26.2 (−3.2)	29.4 (−1.4)	38.3 (3.5)	50.7 (10.4)	64.4 (18.0)	73.8 (23.2)	79.1 (26.2)	79.0 (26.1)	70.9 (21.6)	57.4 (14.1)	43.9 (6.6)	32.6 (0.3)	53.8 (12.1)
Daily mean °F (°C)	15.5 (−9.2)	17.7 (−7.9)	27.9 (−2.3)	40.0 (4.4)	52.4 (11.3)	61.8 (16.6)	67.5 (19.7)	66.7 (19.3)	58.6 (14.8)	46.3 (7.9)	35.1 (1.7)	23.2 (−4.9)	42.7 (6.0)
Mean daily minimum °F (°C)	4.8 (−15.1)	6.0 (−14.4)	17.6 (−8.0)	29.2 (−1.6)	40.4 (4.7)	49.8 (9.9)	55.9 (13.3)	54.4 (12.4)	46.3 (7.9)	35.2 (1.8)	26.3 (−3.2)	13.8 (−10.1)	31.6 (−0.2)
Record low °F (°C)	−39 (−39)	−38 (−39)	−22 (−30)	0 (−18)	15 (−9)	28 (−2)	34 (1)	30 (−1)	19 (−7)	10 (−12)	−8 (−22)	−32 (−36)	−39 (−39)
Average precipitation inches (mm)	3.54 (90)	2.45 (62)	3.41 (87)	3.45 (88)	3.93 (100)	3.85 (98)	3.58 (91)	3.18 (81)	3.71 (94)	4.84 (123)	4.52 (115)	4.03 (102)	44.49 (1,131)
Average snowfall inches (cm)	24.1 (61)	16.4 (42)	19.2 (49)	6.2 (16)	0.1 (0.25)	0.0 (0.0)	0.0 (0.0)	0.0 (0.0)	0.0 (0.0)	0.3 (0.76)	4.6 (12)	15.8 (40)	86.7 (221.01)
Average precipitation days (≥ 0.01 in)	11.0	9.4	11.5	11.2	12.2	11.2	11.7	9.5	9.9	9.9	10.6	10.4	128.5
Average snowy days (≥ 0.1 in)	9.0	6.7	6.2	2.4	0.1	0.0	0.0	0.0	0.0	0.3	2.5	5.6	32.8
Source 1: NOAA
Source 2: National Weather Service

== Demographics ==
Historical population
Census	Pop.	Note	%±
1830	17		—
1870	329		—
1880	381		15.8%
1890	870		128.3%
1900	550		−36.8%
1910	623		13.3%
1920	585		−6.1%
1930	713		21.9%
1940	627		−12.1%
1950	497		−20.7%
1960	389		−21.7%
1970	263		−32.4%
1980	256		−2.7%
1990	201		−21.5%
2000	147		−26.9%
2010	140		−4.8%
2020	102		−27.1%
U.S. Decennial Census

=== 2010 census ===
As of the census of 2010, there were 140 people, 60 households, and 42 families living in the town. The population density was 7.0 inhabitants per square mile (2.7/km^{2}). There were 151 housing units at an average density of 7.5 per square mile (2.9/km^{2}). The racial makeup of the town was 95.0% White, 0.7% Native American, 0.7% Asian, and 3.6% from two or more races. Hispanic or Latino of any race were 1.4% of the population.

There were 60 households, of which 25.0% had children under the age of 18 living with them, 51.7% were married couples living together, 10.0% had a female householder with no husband present, 8.3% had a male householder with no wife present, and 30.0% were non-families. 23.3% of all households were made up of individuals, and 13.3% had someone living alone who was 65 years of age or older. The average household size was 2.33 and the average family size was 2.76.

The median age in the town was 48.3 years. 20.7% of residents were under the age of 18; 3.5% were between the ages of 18 and 24; 25% were from 25 to 44; 32.8% were from 45 to 64; and 17.9% were 65 years of age or older. The gender makeup of the town was 54.3% male and 45.7% female.

=== 2000 census ===
Languages (2000)	Percent
Spoke English at home	100.00%

As of the census of 2000, there were 147 people, 68 households, and 42 families living in the town. The population density was 7.2 people per square mile (2.8/km^{2}). There were 159 housing units at an average density of 7.8 per square mile (3.0/km^{2}). The racial makeup of the town was 97.28% White, 0.68% African American and 2.04% Native American. Hispanic or Latino of any race were 0.68% of the population.

There were 68 households, out of which 23.5% had children under the age of 18 living with them, 50.0% were married couples living together, 5.9% had a female householder with no husband present, and 38.2% were non-families. 30.9% of all households were made up of individuals, and 16.2% had someone living alone who was 65 years of age or older. The average household size was 2.16 and the average family size was 2.69.

In the town, the population was spread out, with 17.0% under the age of 18, 5.4% from 18 to 24, 24.5% from 25 to 44, 36.7% from 45 to 64, and 16.3% who were 65 years of age or older. The median age was 46 years. For every 100 females, there were 119.4 males. For every 100 females age 18 and over, there were 114.0 males.

The median income for a household in the town was $17,386, and the median income for a family was $24,063. Males had a median income of $23,750 versus $15,625 for females. The per capita income for the town was $13,580. There were 19.5% of families and 18.4% of the population living below the poverty line, including 8.0% of under eighteens and 14.3% of those over 64.

== Economy ==
Vanceboro is home to a border post which controls the Vanceboro port of entry for Maine State Route 6 and the New Brunswick Southern Railway line.

== Culture ==
Katherine Cassidy, an ex-member of the Maine House of Representatives, stated in the Bangor Daily News in 2015 that the community has a "quiet, four-season lifestyle that revolves around woods and water".

== Education ==
Vanceboro is in the Vanceboro School District. Residents go to East Range II CSD School in Topsfield (K-8 school) of the Alternative Organization System 90 school district. High school students go to East Grand School in Danforth or Lee Academy in Lee.

Vanceboro School, then a K-12 school, was constructed in 1925. The cost was $30,000, which would be $543,724.86 in 2024 dollars. The high school division ended in 1967. The final school facility opened in 1993, and a firestation was built on the site of the former school, which was razed. The Vanceboro School closed altogether in 2016, and the Vanceboro Historical Museum occupied the 1993 building.

== Notable person ==
- Lyn Mikel Brown
