= Saint Stephen Parish =

Coordinates: 45.21125°N 67.325935°W

Saint Stephen St. Stephen
- Parish
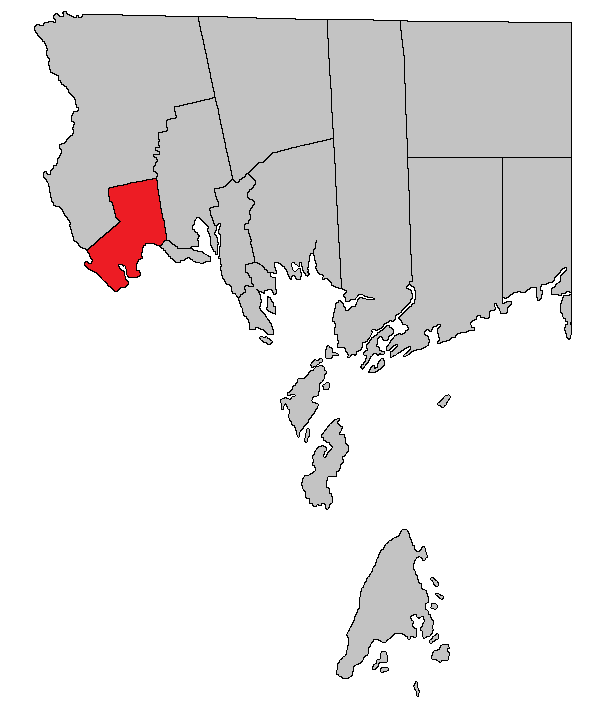
- Location within Charlotte County.
- Country: Canada
- Province: New Brunswick
- County: Charlotte County
- Erected: 1786

Area
  - Land: 102.83 km^{2} (39.70 sq mi)

Population (2021)
  - Total: 1,671
  - Density: 16.3/km^{2} (42/sq mi)
  - Change 2016-2021: ▼9.1%
  - Dwellings: 772
- Time zone: UTC-4 (AST)
  - Summer (DST): UTC-3 (ADT)
- Figures do not include portion within the town of St. Stephen

Saint Stephen is a geographic parish in Charlotte County, New Brunswick, Canada, (Note: The Territorial Division Act divides the province into 152 parishes, the cities of Saint John and Fredericton, and one town of Grand Falls. The Interpretation Act clarifies that parishes include any local government within their borders.) located in the southwestern corner of the province.

For governance purposes, almost the entire parish is part of the town of the Municipal District of St. Stephen, with a small area along Moores Mills Lake belonging to the Southwest rural district, both of which are members of the Southwest New Brunswick Service Commission.

Prior to the 2023 governance reform, it comprised one town, two local service districts (LSDs), and part of a third LSD, all of which were members of the Southwest New Brunswick Service Commission (SNBSC).

The Census subdivision of the same name includes all of the parish except the town of St. Stephen.

== Origin of name ==
Historian William F. Ganong believed the name suggested by other Saint names in the area. Five of the original six mainland parishes of Charlotte County used names of major saints recognised by the Church of England: Andrew (Scotland), David (Wales), George (England), Patrick (Ireland), and Stephen.

== History ==
Saint Stephen Parish was established in 1786 as one of Charlotte County's original parishes, including Dufferin Parish, but only extending as far north as Hayman Hill and Swede Road.

== Boundaries ==
Saint Stephen Parish is bounded:

- on the north by a line beginning at a point about 1.2 kilometres east-northeast of where Route 735 crosses Hoodleys Brook, then running east-northeasterly along the prolongation of the northern line of a grant to Robert Watson, the Watson grant, and the prolongation to a point on the eastern shore of Moores Mills Lake about 600 metres north of the kink in Murphy Road;
- on the east by a line running downstream through Moores Mills Lake and Dennis Stream to where the stream crosses the eastern line of the tier of grants along Route 750, about 350 metres east of the junction of Marks Road and Route 750, then southerly along the eastern line of the tier and its prolongation to the rear line of grants fronting on the St. Croix River, then westerly along the rear line to the Old Bay Road, then southwesterly along the road to the mouth of Dennis Stream;
- on the south and southwest by the St. Croix River;
- on the northwest by a line beginning on the St. Croix about 1.5 kilometres upstream of the end of Chandler Road, at the prolongation of the northwestern line of a grant to Isabella Boyce on the western side of Mohannes Stream, then running northeasterly along the prolongation, the Boyce grant, and the prolongation to meet the western line of grants along Route 735, then northerly along the western line of the tier of grants, crossing Route 735 and continuing on to the starting point.

=== Evolution of boundaries ===
The original northern line of Saint Stephen began near Valley Road and ran westerly through Hayman Hill and Swede Road to the St. Croix River. The identity of the St. Croix was still in dispute, the British claiming the Penobscot as the river where Samuel de Champlain overwintered, the Americans claimed the Magaguadavic. In 1798 the boundary commission settled on the Schoodic River following the discovery of Champlain's site on Dochets Island and the river was officially renamed St. Croix.

In 1813 the northern line was extended north to match the northern line of Saint David Parish, adding everything south of a line from Saint David's northwestern corner to north of the mouth of King Brook Lake. Basswood Ridge, DeWolfe, Gleason Road, Oak Hill, Pomeroy Ridge, Scotch Ridge, and Upper Little Ridge are all in the area that was added.

In 1823 the northern and northwestern parts of the parish formed the newly erected Saint James Parish, giving the parish its current northern boundary. (Note: A single-word error inserted in 1850 was corrected in 1958 without the boundary ever changing.)

In 1873 the eastern part of the parish was erected as Dufferin Parish, giving the parish its current boundaries.

== Former governance ==
=== Town ===
The pre-reform town of St. Stephen is in the southeastern corner of the parish, stretching from nearly the eastern line of the parish to Milltown.

=== Local service districts ===
All LSDs assessed for only the basic LSD services of fire protection, police services, land use planning, emergency measures, and dog control.

==== Saint Stephen Parish ====
The local service district of the parish of Saint Stephen originally comprised all of the parish outside the twin towns of St. Stephen and Milltown. It was later reduced to the southwestern corner of the mainland and the islands of the St. Croix River.

The LSD was established in 1969 to assess for community services, in this case to provide ambulance service after local funeral homes ceased doing so. Fire protection was added in 1970.

The taxing authority was 518.00 Saint Stephen.

==== Dennis-Weston ====
Dennis-Weston comprised all of the mainland east from the rear line of grants along Route 740.

The LSD was established in 1988 to assesses for first aid and ambulance services.

The taxing authority was 529.00 Dennis-Weston.

==== Western Charlotte ====
Western Charlotte extended into Saint Stephen Parish from Saint James Parish.

=== Former municipalities ===
- Milltown was a town on the western edge of St. Stephen, with Boundary Street as the border between them. It was incorporated in 1873, and amalgamated with St. Stephen on 1 October 1973 as St. Stephen – Milltown, which was renamed St. Stephen in 1975.
- Upper Mills was a town along the St. Croix River from slightly west of the mouth of Mohannes Stream to the Bailey Rips. It was incorporated in 1874 and dissolved in 1896.

== Communities ==
Communities at least partly within the parish. bold indicates an incorporated municipality

- Barter Settlement
- Blackland
- Burnt Hill
- Five Corners
- Four Corners
- Hayman Hill
- Heathland
- Maxwell Crossing
- Mayfield
- Mohannes
- Old Ridge
- **St. Stephen**
  - Milltown
  - Union Mills
- Upper Mills
- Valley Road

== Bodies of water ==
Bodies of water (Note: Not including brooks, ponds or coves.) at least partly within the parish.

- St. Croix River
  - Woodland Flowage
- Dennis Stream
- Mohannes Stream
- Kendricks Lake
- Moores Mills Lake

== Islands ==
Islands at least partly within the parish.

- Butler Islands
- numerous unnamed islands in the St. Croix River

== Other notable places ==
Parks, historic sites, and other noteworthy places at least partly within the parish.

- St. Stephen Airport

== Demographics ==
Population total does not include town of St. Stephen

=== Population ===
Canada census – Saint Stephen community profile

	2021	2016	2011
Population	1,671 (-9.1% from 2016)	1,839 (-7.4% from 2011)	1,986 (-6.0% from 2006)
Land area	102.83 km^{2} (39.70 sq mi)	103.25 km^{2} (39.87 sq mi)	103.38 km^{2} (39.92 sq mi)
Population density	16.3/km^{2} (42/sq mi)	17.8/km^{2} (46/sq mi)	19.2/km^{2} (50/sq mi)
Median age	49.6 (M: 48.8, F: 50.4)	47.8 (M: 46.9, F: 48.7)	44.0 (M: 43.5, F: 44.5)
Private dwellings	705 (total)	820 (total)	827 (total)
Median household income		$50,560	$50,064

References: 2021 2016 2011

Historical Census Data - Saint Stephen Parish, New Brunswick

Year	Pop.	±%
1991	1,818	—
1996	1,890	+4.0%

Year	Pop.	±%
2001	1,856	−1.8%
2006	2,113	+13.8%

Year	Pop.	±%
2011	1,986	−6.0%
2016	1,839	−7.4%

=== Language ===
Canada Census Mother Tongue - Saint Stephen Parish, New Brunswick
Census	Total	English			French			English & French			Other		
Year	Responses	Count	Trend	Pop %	Count	Trend	Pop %	Count	Trend	Pop %	Count	Trend	Pop %
2011	1,955	1,900	▼6.9%	97.19%	35	▼12.5%	1.79%	5	▲ n/a%	0.25%	15	▼40.0%	0.77%
2006	2,105	2,040	▲12.0%	96.91%	40	▲12.5%	1.90%	0	▼100.0%	0.00%	25	▲60.0%	1.19%
2001	1,850	1,795	▼1.9%	97.03%	35	▲28.6%	1.89%	10	▲ n/a%	0.54%	10	▲ n/a%	0.54%
1996	1,855	1,830	n/a	98.65%	25	n/a	1.35%	0	n/a	0.00%	0	n/a	0.00%

== Access Routes ==
Highways and numbered routes that run through the parish, including external routes that start or finish at the parish limits:

- **Highways**
  - Route 1
  - Route 3
- **Principal Routes**
  - Route 170
- Secondary Routes:
  - None
- External Routes:
  - None

== See also ==
- List of parishes in New Brunswick
