= Saint James Parish, New Brunswick =

Coordinates: 45.381572°N 67.345505°W

Saint James St. James
- Parish
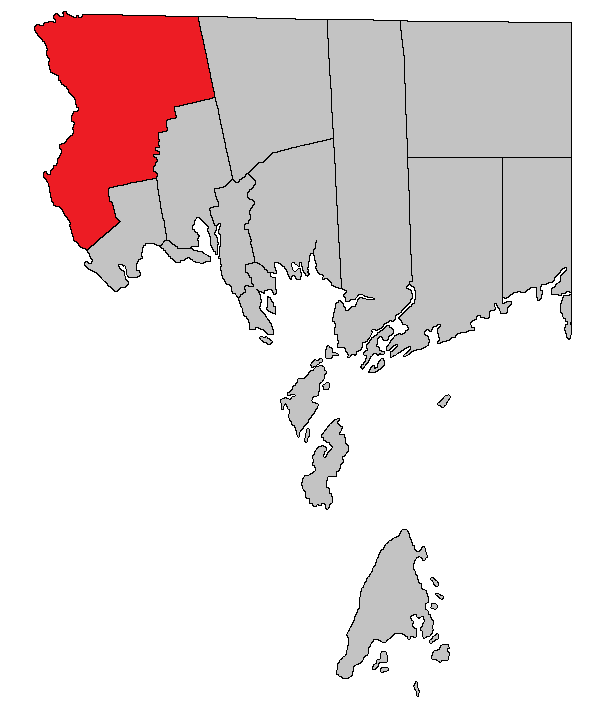
- Location within Charlotte County.
- Country: Canada
- Province: New Brunswick
- County: Charlotte County
- Erected: 1823

Area
  - Land: 552.90 km^{2} (213.48 sq mi)

Population (2021)
  - Total: 1,024
  - Density: 1.9/km^{2} (4.9/sq mi)
  - Change 2016-2021: ▼13.7%
  - Dwellings: 499
- Time zone: UTC-4 (AST)
  - Summer (DST): UTC-3 (ADT)

Saint James is a geographic parish in Charlotte County, New Brunswick, Canada, (Note: The Territorial Division Act divides the province into 152 parishes, the cities of Saint John and Fredericton, and one town of Grand Falls. The Interpretation Act clarifies that parishes include any local government within their borders.) located north of St. Stephen.

For governance purposes, Little Ridge and areas to the south are part of the town of the Municipal District of St. Stephen, while the rest of the parish is part of the Southwest rural district, both of which are members of the Southwest New Brunswick Service Commission.

Prior to the 2023 governance reform, it comprised one local service district (LSD) and part of a second, both of which were members of the Southwest New Brunswick Service Commission (SNBSC).

The Census subdivision of the same name shares the parish's borders.

== Origin of name ==
Historian William Francis Ganong believed the name suggested by other Saint names in the area.

Five of the original six mainland parishes of Charlotte County used names of major saints recognised by the Church of England: Andrew (Scotland), David (Wales), George (England), Patrick (Ireland), and Stephen, and Saint James was the first new mainland parish to be erected in the county.

== History ==
Saint James was erected in 1823 from Saint Stephen Parish and unassigned lands to the north of Saint Stephen and Saint David Parish; the northern line of Saint Stephen had run above Gleason Point, Oak Hill, and DeWolfe.

== Boundaries ==
Saint James Parish is bounded:

- on the north by the York County line;
- on the east by a line beginning about 4.7 kilometres east of the Digdeguash River, on the prolongation of the eastern line of the Cape Ann Association, which runs along the rear line of grants on the eastern side of Board Road, then running south to the Digdeguash River;
- on the southeast and south by a line running along the Cape Ann Association grant, westerly to a point about 1.2 kilometres west of the junction of Richardson Road and Route 755 and about 450 metres north of Scott Road, then in 1.5-kilometre steps southerly, westerly, southerly, and westerly to the Dennis Stream, then downstream through Moores Mills Lake to a point about 600 metres north of the kink in Murphy Road, on the prolongation of the southern line of two grants to James Maxwell, then westerly along the prolongation, the Maxwell grants, passing about 300 metres north of the junction of Route 745 and Route 3, and along the prolongation to a point about 3 kilometres past Route 740, on the corner of the tier of grants between Route 740 and Route 735, then southerly and southeasterly along the tier, crossing Route 735, to a point about 550 metres north of Kendricks Lake, on the southeastern line of a grant to John McCauly, then southwesterly along the McCauly grant and its prolongation to the St. Croix River;
- on the west by the St. Croix River.

== Former local service districts ==
Both LSDs assessed for only the basic LSD services of fire protection, police services, land use planning, emergency measures, and dog control.

=== Saint James Parish ===
The local service district of the parish of Saint James originally comprised the entire parish.

The LSD was established in 1969 to assess for community services, in this case to provide ambulance service after local funeral homes ceased doing so. Fire protection was added in 1970.

The taxing authority was 520.00 Saint James.

=== Western Charlotte ===
Western Charlotte comprised an area along the St. Croix River, running east from the mouth of Canoose Stream, then south along Green Brown Brook until it strikes the rear line of grants along the eastern side of the Basswood Ridge Road until it crosses Robinson Cross Road, southwesterly until it strikes the rear line of grants along Route 740, then southerly to the parish line, following the parish line to the western line of grants along Route 740, then running southerly along grant lines to St. Stephen, westerly along the St. Stephen limits to the western end of the town, then northwesterly along the rear line of grants west of Barter Settlement Road before turning southwesterly to strike the Mohannes Stream about midway between the two crossings of the Burnt Hill Road, upstream to about midway between the Chandler Road and the parish line, turning southwesterly to the rear line of grants along Route 725, then northwesterly to the parish line and southwest to the St. Croix.

The LSD was established in 1988 to add first aid and ambulance services.

The taxing authority was 528.00 Western Charlotte.

== Communities ==
Communities at least partly within the parish.

- Andersonville
- Baillie
- Barber Dam
- Basswood Ridge
- Beaconsfield
- Canoose
- DeWolfe
- Gleason Road
- Lawrence Station
- Lower Little Ridge
- Lynnfield
- Meredith Settlement
- Moores Mills
- Oak Hill
- Pomeroy Ridge
- Scotch Ridge
- Upper Little Ridge
- Watt Junction
- Weeks Road

== Bodies of water ==
Bodies of water (Note: Not including brooks, ponds or coves.) at least partly within the parish.

- Digdeguash River
- St. Croix River
  - Grand Falls Flowage
  - Woodland Flowage
- Canoose Stream
  - Canoose Flowage
  - Upper Canoose Flowage
- Dennis Stream
- Mohannes Stream
- Loon Bay
- Black Water Lake
- Cranberry Lake
- King Brook Lake
- Middle Lake
- Moores Mills Lake
- Mud Lake
- Potters Lake

== Islands ==
Islands at least partly within the parish.

- Dog Islands
- Grassy Islands
- Gravel Island
- Green Island
- Horse Island
- King Brook Islands

== Other notable places ==
Parks, historic sites, and other noteworthy places at least partly within the parish.

- Andersonville Protected Natural Area
- Baillie Settlement Protected Natural Area
- Canoose Flowage Protected Natural Area
- Clark Point Protected Natural Area
- Cowlily Pond Brook Protected Natural Area
- Saint Croix Provincial Park
- St. Croix River Islands Protected Natural Area

== Demographics ==
=== Population ===
Canada census – Saint James community profile

	2021	2016	2011
Population	1,024 (-13.7% from 2016)	1,186 (-4.4% from 2011)	1,241 (-8.1% from 2006)
Land area	552.90 km^{2} (213.48 sq mi)	556.62 km^{2} (214.91 sq mi)	556.00 km^{2} (214.67 sq mi)
Population density	1.9/km^{2} (4.9/sq mi)	2.1/km^{2} (5.4/sq mi)	2.2/km^{2} (5.7/sq mi)
Median age	52 (M: 52, F: 53.2)	47.7 (M: 47.8, F: 47.5)	44.5 (M: 42.2, F: 46.5)
Private dwellings	450 (total)	570 (total)	590 (total)
Median household income		$45,184	$51,753

References: 2021 2016 2011

Historical Census Data - Saint James Parish, New Brunswick

Year	Pop.	±%
1991	1,367	—
1996	1,398	+2.3%

Year	Pop.	±%
2001	1,430	+2.3%
2006	1,350	−5.6%

Year	Pop.	±%
2011	1,241	−8.1%
2016	1,186	−4.4%

=== Language ===
Canada Census Mother Tongue - Saint James Parish, New Brunswick
Census	Total	French			English			French & English			Other		
Year	Responses	Count	Trend	Pop %	Count	Trend	Pop %	Count	Trend	Pop %	Count	Trend	Pop %
2011	1,235	1,200	▼9.4%	97.17%	25	▲40.0%	2.02%	0	0.0%	0.00%	10	▲ n/a%	0.81%
2006	1,340	1,325	▼4.0%	98.88%	15	0.0%	1.12%	0	0.0%	0.00%	0	0.0%	0.00%
2001	1,395	1,380	0.0%	98.92%	15	▲33.3%	1.08%	0	0.0%	0.00%	0	0.0%	0.00%
1996	1,390	1,380	n/a	99.28%	10	n/a	0.72%	0	n/a	0.00%	0	n/a	0.00%

== Access Routes ==
Highways and numbered routes that run through the parish, including external routes that start or finish at the parish limits:

- Highways
  - Route 3
- Principal Routes
  - Route 127
- Secondary Routes:
  - None
- External Routes:
  - None

== See also ==
- List of parishes in New Brunswick
