= Saint Croix Parish =

Coordinates: 45.190022°N 67.112389°W

Saint Croix St. Croix
- Parish
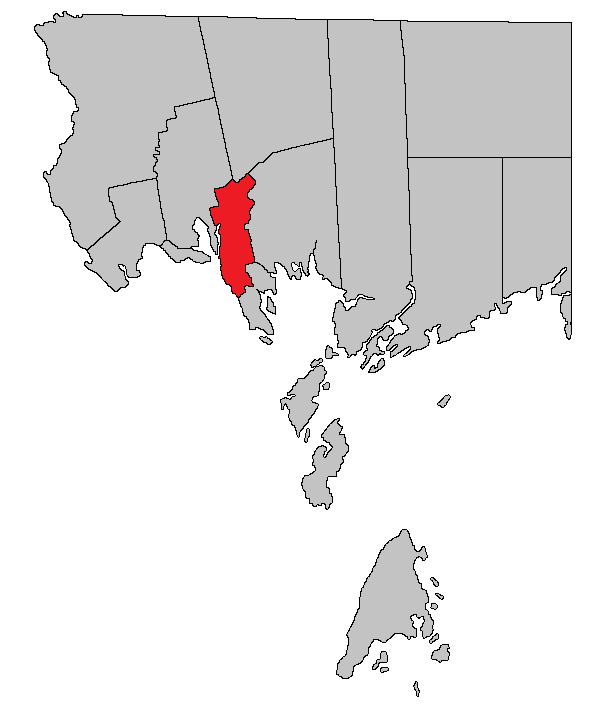
- Location within Charlotte County.
- Country: Canada
- Province: New Brunswick
- County: Charlotte County
- Erected: 1874
- Named for: St. Croix River

Area
  - Land: 78.60 km^{2} (30.35 sq mi)

Population (2021)
  - Total: 648
  - Density: 8.2/km^{2} (21/sq mi)
  - Change 2016-2021: ▼1.4%
  - Dwellings: 346
- Time zone: UTC-4 (AST)
  - Summer (DST): UTC-3 (ADT)
- Highways: Route 1 / Route 127 / Route 170 / Route 760

Saint Croix is a geographic parish in Charlotte County, New Brunswick, Canada, (Note: The Territorial Division Act divides the province into 152 parishes, the cities of Saint John and Fredericton, and one town of Grand Falls. The Interpretation Act clarifies that parishes include any local government within their borders.) straddling Route 1 to the north of the original town of Saint Andrews.

For governance purposes, all of the parish south of Route 1 is part of the post-reform town of Saint Andrews, the Board Road area is part of the town of the Municipal District of St. Stephen, and the remainder north of Route 1 is part of the Southwest rural district, all of which are members of the Southwest New Brunswick Service Commission.

Prior to the 2023 governance reform, it comprised two local service districts, both of which were members of the Southwest New Brunswick Service Commission (SNBSC).

The Census subdivision of the same name includes the entire parish, while the former LSD of Bayside is used as a Designated place.

== Origin of name ==
The parish's name comes from the St. Croix River, which forms part of its western border.

== History ==
Saint Croix was erected in 1874 from the northern part of Saint Andrews Parish, including parts of Saint Andrews, Saint David, and Saint Patrick Parishes but lacking the northeastern part of modern Saint Croix.

== Boundaries ==
Saint Croix is bounded:

- on the east and south by a highly irregular line (Note: It's easier to look at the boundaries on a map than it is to follow a detailed description.) beginning about 350 metres northwesterly of the junction of Wilson Road and Route 127, then running southeasterly past Route 127 to the northwestern line of a grant to James McFarlane, then running generally southerly along the rear lines of tiers of grants along Cathcart Road, Route 760, Giles Road, Armstrongs Mill Road, Goldsmiths Stream, Eastman Lake, Bonaparte Lake, Welch Lake, and Gibson Lake to the southeastern corner of a grant to James Greenlaw, then westerly to Little Chamcook Lake, then southerly along Little Chamcook Lake and the brook to Chamcook Lake, then clockwise around Chamcook Lake to a point west of the southern end of Odell Island, then southwesterly to the rear line of grants along the St. Croix River, then southeasterly about 2.5 kilometres to a point near Edwards Corner, then southwesterly along the southeastern line of a grant to Daniel Grant to the St. Croix;
- on the west by the St. Croix River, Oak Bay, and the Waweig River to Route 170, then northerly along the rear line of Oak Bay grants just past Route 760, then easterly along the northern line of a grant to William H. Mowat, then northerly along the rear line of grants to a point about 1 kilometres past Board Road, then easterly and northeasterly along grant lines to the starting point;
- including Rickets Island.

=== Evolution of boundaries ===
Saint Croix originally included five grants in Oak Bay that are now in Saint David Parish, parts of Saint Andrews Parish west of the railway and north of Wilsons Corner, and a strip of land in southwestern Saint Patrick Parish; Giles Road, Cathcart Road, the eastern end of Armstrong Mill Road, and a few small areas along the eastern edge remained part of Saint Patrick.

In 1881 the Oak Bay lots were transferred to Saint David and the northeastern part of modern Saint Croix was taken from Saint Patrick. (Note: Dumbarton Parish is also mentioned in the Act but no change took place; same boundary with Dumbarton is used until 1958.)

In 1896 Ricketts Island and St. Croix Island were explicitly placed in Saint Croix Parish, though St. Croix Island had been part of Maine for nearly a century; the St. Croix Island error was corrected in 1899. The boundary with Saint Patrick was moved west along nearly half its length in the south. (Note: The new boundary line reads as if there was a clerical error replacing a reference to the old boundary with a reference to the eastern line of Saint David Parish in the north. The boundary certainly makes more sense if one assumes such an error.)

In 1958 the modern parish boundaries were set, losing land between the railway and the Chamcook Lakes system as well as a triangle north of Wileys Corner to Saint Andrews, gaining a triangular piece of Dumbarton Parish on the northern edge, (Note: This may have just been correcting an oversight in 1881; amendments to three others parishes in 1958 were corrections of errors or omissions.) and gaining several bits of Saint Patrick by changing the eastern boundary to run entirely along grant lines and natural features.

== Local service districts ==
Both LSDs assess for the basic LSD services of fire protection, police services, land use planning, emergency measures, and dog control.

=== Saint Croix Parish ===
The local service district of the parish of Saint Croix originally comprised the entire parish.

The LSD was established in 1970 to assess for fire protection. First aid and ambulance services were added in 1975.

In 2022, the LSD assessed for only basic services. The taxing authority was 514.00 Saint Croix.

=== Bayside ===
Bayside comprised all of the parish mainland south of Route 1.

Bayside was established in 1985 to add community services.

In 2022, the LSD additionally assessed for community & recreation services. The taxing authority was 527.00 Bayside.

== Communities ==
Communities at least partly within the parish. italics indicate a name no longer in official use

- Bartletts Mills
- Bayside (Lower Bayside, Upper Bayside)
- Edwards Corner
- Gilmans Corner
- Roix Road
- Waweig
- Wileys Corner

== Bodies of water ==
Bodies of water (Note: Not including brooks, ponds or coves.) at least partly within the parish. italics indicate a name no longer in official use

- St. Croix River
- Waweig River
- Chamcook Stream
- Goldsmiths Stream
- Chamcook Lake
- Little Chamcook Lake (Second Chamcook Lake)
- more than a dozen other officially named lakes

== Islands ==
Islands at least partly within the parish.

- Big Rock (Note: Classified as a shoal by CGNS but visible on cadastral map of the area.) (in Chamcook Lake)
- Odell Island (in Chamcook Lake)
- Rickets Island (in Waweig River)

== Census data ==
=== Population ===
Canada census – Saint Croix community profile

	2021	2016	2011
Population	648 (-1.4% from 2016)	657 (+6.7% from 2011)	616 (-8.1% from 2006)
Land area	78.60 km^{2} (30.35 sq mi)	78.67 km^{2} (30.37 sq mi)	78.77 km^{2} (30.41 sq mi)
Population density	8.2/km^{2} (21/sq mi)	8.4/km^{2} (22/sq mi)	7.8/km^{2} (20/sq mi)
Median age	52.8 (M: 52.8, F: 53.2)	48.1 (M: 49.5, F: 46.3)	45.2 (M: 45.8, F: 45.0)
Private dwellings	280 (total)	368 (total)	322 (total)
Median household income		$55,040	$45,812

References: 2021 2016 2011

Historical Census Data - Saint Croix Parish, New Brunswick

Year	Pop.	±%
1991	588	—
1996	657	+11.7%
2001	639	−2.7%

Year	Pop.	±%
2001A	634	−0.8%
2006	670	+5.7%
2011	616	−8.1%

Year	Pop.	±%
2016	657	+6.7%

(A) adjustment due to boundary change.

=== Language ===
Canada Census Mother Tongue - Saint Croix Parish, New Brunswick
Census	Total	English			French			English & French			Other		
Year	Responses	Count	Trend	Pop %	Count	Trend	Pop %	Count	Trend	Pop %	Count	Trend	Pop %
2011	610	590	▼9.9%	96.72%	10	▲ n/a%	1.64%	0	0.0%	0.00%	10	0.0%	1.64%
2006	665	655	▲5.3%	98.50%	0	▼100.0%	0.00%	0	0.0%	0.00%	10	▲ n/a%	1.50%
2001	635	620	▼4.6%	97.64%	15	▲33.3%	2.36%	0	0.0%	0.00%	0	0.0%	0.00%
1996	660	650	n/a	98.48%	10	n/a	1.52%	0	n/a	0.00%	0	n/a	0.00%

== See also ==
- List of parishes in New Brunswick
