= Saint Andrews Parish =

Coordinates: 45.132043°N 67.069302°W

Saint Andrews St. Andrews
- Parish
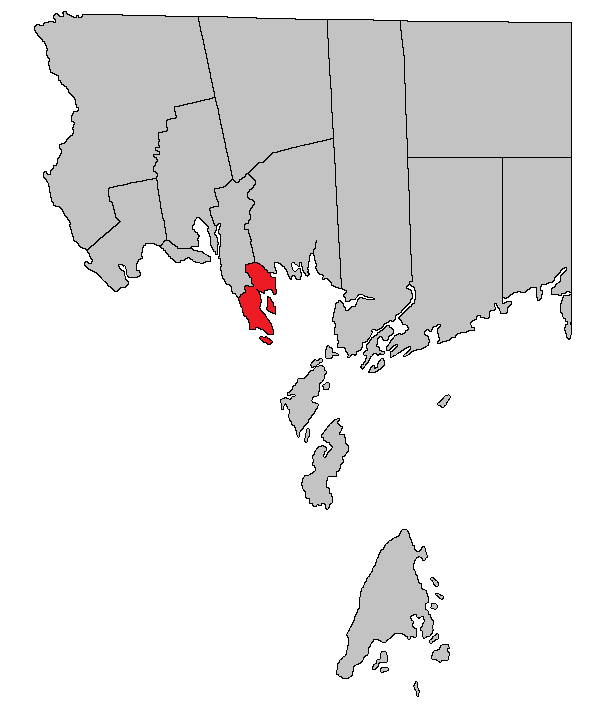
- Location within Charlotte County.
- Country: Canada
- Province: New Brunswick
- County: Charlotte County
- Erected: 1786

Area
  - Land: 24.27 km^{2} (9.37 sq mi)

Population (2021)
  - Total: 550
  - Density: 22.7/km^{2} (59/sq mi)
  - Change 2016-2021: ▼0.5%
  - Dwellings: 296
- Time zone: UTC-4 (AST)
  - Summer (DST): UTC-3 (ADT)
- Figures do not include portion within the town of Saint Andrews

Saint Andrews Parish is a geographic parish in Charlotte County, New Brunswick, Canada, (Note: The Territorial Division Act divides the province into 152 parishes, the cities of Saint John and Fredericton, and one town of Grand Falls. The Interpretation Act clarifies that parishes include any local government within their borders.) located east of St. Stephen.

For governance purposes, the entire parish is part of the town of Saint Andrews, which is a member of the Southwest New Brunswick Service Commission.

Prior to the 2023 governance reform, it comprised the town of Saint Andrews, which included Navy Island, and the Chamcook local service district, which included Ministers Island and the mainland north of the town. The LSD assessed for fire, police, zoning, emergency measures and animal control services. The taxing authority was 513.00 Chamcook. Both the town and the LSD are members of the Southwest New Brunswick Service Commission (SNBSC).

For census purposes, Statistics Canada divides the area into Saint Andrews, Parish, and Saint Andrews, Town.

== Origin of name ==
Historian William F. Ganong notes the use of St. Andrews Point in the Owen Journal of 1770 but considered the name to date back to French times.

Five of the original six mainland parishes of Charlotte County used names of major saints recognised by the Church of England: Andrew (Scotland), David (Wales), George (England), Patrick (Ireland), and Stephen.

== History ==
Saint Andrews Parish was erected in 1786 as one of the county's original parishes, including most of Saint Croix Parish and parts of Saint David and Saint Patrick Parishes.

The local service district of the parish of Saint Andrews comprised all of the parish outside Saint Andrews. It was established in 1970 to assess for fire protection. First aid and ambulance services were added in 1975. It was replaced by Chamcook in 1997.

== Boundaries ==
Saint Andrews Parish is bounded:

- on the north and northeast by a line beginning on the eastern side of Little Chamcook Lake, then running easterly along the northern line of a grant to Amos White to a point about 100 metres east of Mitchell Brook, then east-southeasterly about 500 metres to meet the eastern line of the White grant, then southeasterly along the White grant and the Glebe lot to Birch Cove;
- on the east by Birch Cove, Big Bay, and Passamaquoddy Bay;
- on the south by Passamaquoddy Bay;
- on the west by the St. Croix River and a line running northeasterly along the northern line of the main grant of St. Andrews to near Edwards Corner, then northwesterly about 2.5 kilometres along the rear line of grants on the St. Croix River, then northeasterly to the shore of Chamcook Lake, then counterclockwise along the shore of Chamcook Lake to the mouth of the creek, then northerly along the creek and Little Chamcook Lake to the starting point;
- including Ministers Island and Navy Island.

=== Evolution of boundaries ===
Saint Andrews' original eastern boundary ran straight from the original southeastern corner of the Cape Association grant that makes up the northern part of Saint David Parish to join its modern northeastern boundary near the head of Mitchell Brook, cutting through the southwestern corner of Saint Patrick Parish and leaving the northeastern part of Saint Croix Parish as part of Saint Patrick. Five grants north of the junction of Board Road and Route 760 that are now part of Saint David Parish were also part of Saint Andrews.

In 1874 the northern part of Saint Andrews was erected as Saint Croix, taking all parts of the parish now in Saint Croix, Saint David, and Saint Patrick as well as a bit of territory north of Wileys Corner and land between the railway and the Chamcook Lakes.

In 1958 the modern boundary with Saint Croix was established, transferring everything between the railway and the Chamcook Lakes to Saint Andrews, as well as territory north of Wileys Corner.

== Communities ==
Communities at least partly within the parish. bold indicates an incorporated municipality; italics indicates a name no longer in official use

- Bar Road
- Chamcook (St. Andrews North)
- Chamcook Lake
- Dougherty
- Edwards Corner
- **Saint Andrews**

== Bodies of water ==
Bodies of water (Note: Not including brooks, ponds or coves.) at least partly within the parish.

- St. Croix River
- Pottery Creek
- Passamaquoddy Bay
- St. Andrews Harbour
- Big Bay (on boundary)
- Chamcook Harbour
- Chamcook Channel
- Western Channel
- Chamcook Lake (boundary)
- Kerrs Lake
- Little Chamcook Lake (boundary)

== Islands ==
Islands at least partly within the parish. italics indicates a name no longer in official use

- Ministers Island
- Navy Island (St. Andrews Island)

== Other notable places ==
Parks, historic sites, and other noteworthy places at least partly within the parish.

- Charlotte County Court House
- Charlotte County Gaol
- Charlotte County Registry Office
- Dunn McQuoid House
- Gladstone Smith House
- Hansen House
- Ministers Island Provincial Park
- Minister's Island Wildlife Management Area
- Pagan Point
- St. Andrews Blockhouse National Historic Site
- Sheriff Andrews House Provincial Park

== Demographics ==
Population total does not include the town of Saint Andrews

=== Population ===
Canada census – Saint Andrews community profile

	2021	2016	2011
Population	550 (-0.5% from 2016)	553 (-6.7% from 2011)	593 (+0.2% from 2006)
Land area	24.27 km^{2} (9.37 sq mi)	24.27 km^{2} (9.37 sq mi)	24.38 km^{2} (9.41 sq mi)
Population density	22.7/km^{2} (59/sq mi)	22.8/km^{2} (59/sq mi)	24.3/km^{2} (63/sq mi)
Median age	54.8 (M: 55.6, F: 54.8)	52.2 (M: 51.8, F: 52.4)	47.6 (M: 47.2, F: 47.9)
Private dwellings	250 (total)	312 (total)	311 (total)
Median household income		$68,864	$.N/A

Notes: 2011 income data for this area has been suppressed for data quality or confidentiality reasons.
References: 2021 2016 2011

Historical Census Data - Saint Andrews Parish, New Brunswick

Year	Pop.	±%
1991	457	—
1996	452	−1.1%
2001	547	+21.0%

Year	Pop.	±%
2001A	552	+0.9%
2006	592	+7.2%
2011	593	+0.2%

Year	Pop.	±%
2016	553	−6.7%

**(A) adjustment due to boundary change.**

=== Language ===
Canada Census Mother Tongue - Saint Andrews Parish, New Brunswick
Census	Total	English			French			English & French			Other		
Year	Responses	Count	Trend	Pop %	Count	Trend	Pop %	Count	Trend	Pop %	Count	Trend	Pop %
2011	590	555	▲1.8%	94.07%	25	▲20.0%	4.24%	0	0.0%	0.00%	10	▼50.0%	1.69%
2006	0	545	▲3.7%	0.00%	20	0.0%	0.00%	0	0.0%	0.00%	20	▲ n/a%	0.00%
2001	545	525	▲12.4%	96.33%	20	▲ n/a%	3.67%	0	0.0%	0.00%	0	▼100.0%	0.00%
1996	460	450	n/a	97.83%	0	n/a	0.00%	0	n/a	0.00%	10	n/a	2.17%

== Access Routes ==
Highways and numbered routes that run through the parish, including external routes that start or finish at the parish limits:

- **Highways**
  - None
- **Principal Routes**
  - Route 127
- Secondary Routes:
  - None
- External Routes:
  - None

== See also ==
- List of parishes in New Brunswick
