= Long Island (Saint Patrick Parish NB) =

Island in New Brunswick, Canada

- Interactive map of Long Island

Geography
- Location: Bay of Fundy
- Coordinates: 45°8′47″N 66°57′22″W
- Highest elevation: 29 m (95 ft)

Administration
- Canada
- Province: New Brunswick
- County: Charlotte
- Parish: Saint Patrick Parish

Long Island (also known as Jasper Island) is an undeveloped island in the Saint Patrick Parish of Charlotte County, New Brunswick, Canada in the Bay of Fundy. It is at the mouth of the Digdeguash River.

In 1795, the McMaster brothers purchased Hardwood Island, Hog Island and Long Island.

As of 1892, it was owned by Mr. Pendleton and Mr. Grimmer, who found silver deposits on the island.

The channel East of Long Island is shoal, while the western channel is a 13-metre anchorage for small vessels half a kilometer NNW of the island.
