= Moores Mills, New Brunswick =

Moores Mills
- Unincorporated community
- Location within New Brunswick.
- Coordinates: 45.30°N 67.28°W
- Country: Canada
- Province: New Brunswick
- County: Charlotte
- Parish: Saint James
- Electoral Districts Federal: New Brunswick Southwest
- Provincial: Charlotte-Campobello

Government
  - Type: Local service district
- Time zone: UTC-4 (AST)
  - Summer (DST): UTC-3 (ADT)
- Postal code(s): E5A
- Area code: 506
- Highways Route 3: Route 745; Route 750

Moores Mills is an unincorporated community in Charlotte County, New Brunswick.

It is near Saint David Ridge, northeast of St. Stephen at Route 745, Route 3 and Route 750.

== See also ==
- List of communities in New Brunswick
