= Hog Island (Saint Patrick Parish) =

Island in New Brunswick, Canada

Geography
- Location: Bay of Fundy
- Highest elevation: 12 m (39 ft)

Administration
- Canada
- Province: New Brunswick
- County: Charlotte
- Parish: Saint Patrick Parish

Hog Island is an undeveloped island in the Saint Patrick Parish of Charlotte County, New Brunswick, Canada in the Bay of Fundy.

In 1795, the McMaster brothers purchased Hardwood Island, Hog Island and Long Island.
