= Oak Bay Provincial Park =

Provincial park in New Brunswick, Canada

Coordinates: 44.876734°N 66.936779°W

Oak Bay Provincial Park is a provincial park located on the St Croix River in Charlotte County, near Oak Bay, New Brunswick, Canada.

It is one of six provincial parks that are privately managed.
