= Elmsville, New Brunswick =

Elmsville
- Unincorporated community
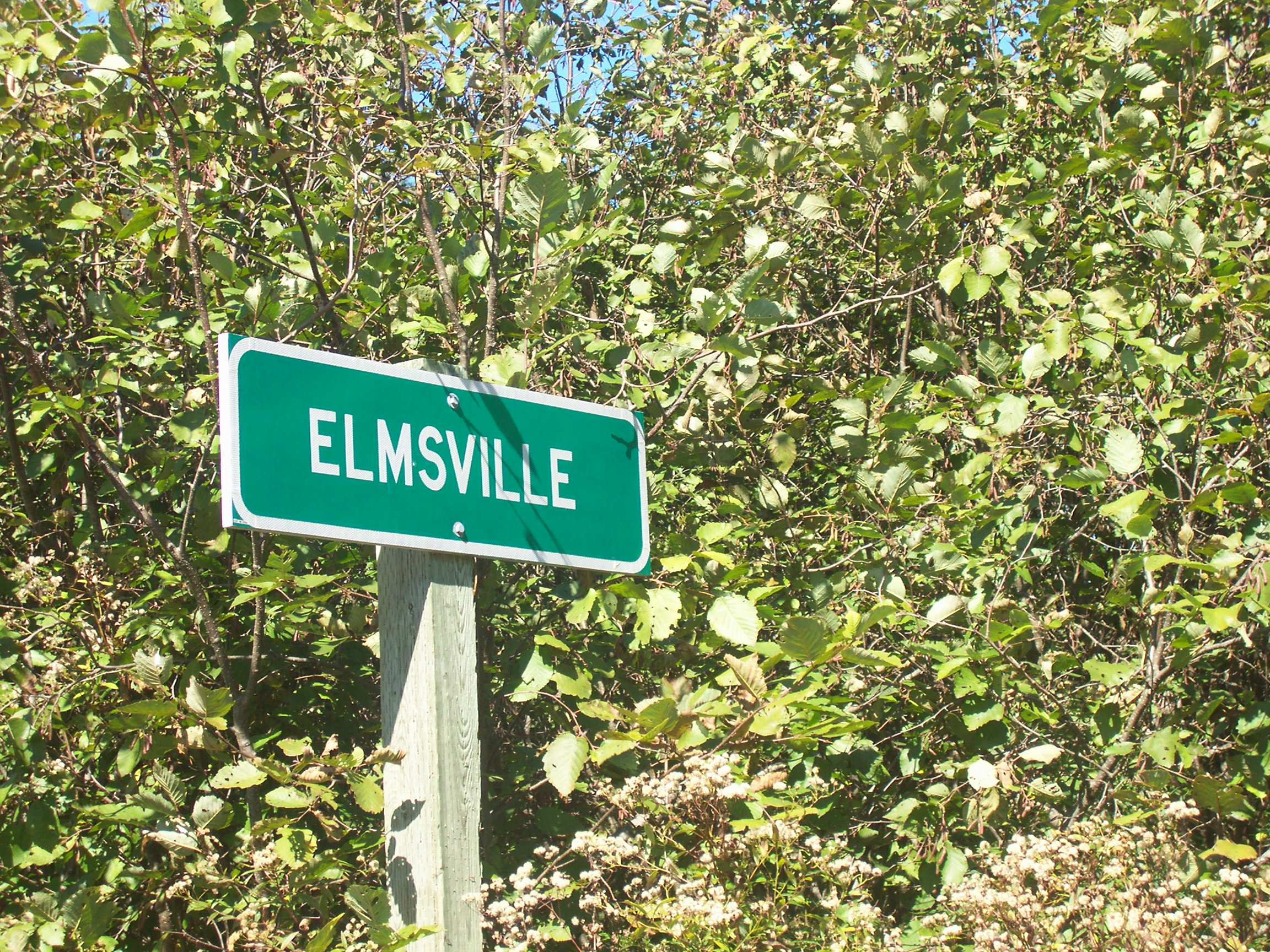

- Location within New Brunswick.
- Coordinates: 45°15′46″N 67°00′33″W
- Country: Canada
- Province: New Brunswick
- County: Charlotte
- Parish: Saint Patrick
- Electoral Districts Federal: New Brunswick Southwest
- Provincial: Charlotte-The Isles

Government
  - Type: Local service district
- Time zone: UTC-4 (AST)
  - Summer (DST): UTC-3 (ADT)
- Postal code(s): E5A
- Area code: 506
- Highways: Route 760

Elmsville is a Canadian unincorporated community in Charlotte County, New Brunswick. It covers a vast territory of rural picturesque countryside. With a population of 57, Elmsville is 3.5 km by 0.8 km in size. Three roads make up this small area and they include Route 760 (Roix Road), Boyd Road, and the Reardon Road. Flowing through almost the center of Elmsville is the Digdeguash River. Being a rural area, hunting is very common for the individuals who live in Elmsville.

== History ==
Elmsville is characterized by its Covered Bridge called the McGuire Covered Bridge which was built in 1913. Elmsville is also home to Christ Church Elmsville (built in the early 1900s) and the Christ Church Hall (built in 1948). Most of the events that are held in Elmsville are held at Christ Church Hall which acts as a community hall and the heart which brings the community together. In 1986, the community came together and created the Elmsville Volunteer Fire Department. Elmsville is also home to the Elmsville hatchery and a pipeline carrying natural gas can be found within the perimeter of Elmsville.

== See also ==
- List of communities in New Brunswick
