= Dufferin =

Dufferin, Dyffryn or Duffryn may refer to:

== Places ==
=== In Burma ===
- Fort Dufferin, the British name for Mandalay Palace during their colonial rule

=== In Canada ===
==== British Columbia ====
- Dufferin Island,
- Dufferin, neighbourhood of the city of Kamloops, from 1971 to 1973 a separate municipality

==== Manitoba ====
- Dufferin (Manitoba provincial electoral district)
- Fort Dufferin, a National Historic Site
- Rural Municipality of Dufferin

==== New Brunswick ====
- Dufferin Parish, a civil parish east of St. Stephen, New Brunswick
- Dufferin Hotel, a former hotel in Saint John, New Brunswick

==== Nova Scotia ====
- Port Dufferin, a small community near Halifax

==== Ontario ====
- Dufferin Bridge, a community in Magnetawan
- Dufferin County
- Dufferin (federal electoral district), a federal electoral district in Ontario, abolished in 1924
- Dufferin Islands, a group of man-made islands near Niagara Falls
- Dufferin Street in Toronto
  - Dufferin (TTC), a subway station on the street

==== Quebec ====
- Terrasse Dufferin, a broad terrace wrapping around much of old Quebec City

==== Saskatchewan ====
- Rural Municipality of Dufferin No. 190, Saskatchewan

=== In the United Kingdom ===
==== Northern Ireland ====
- Dufferin (barony), County Down

==== Wales ====
Dyffryn is Welsh for 'valley'.

- Duffryn, a housing estate in Newport
- Dyffryn, Bridgend
- Dyffryn Cennen, Carmarthenshire
- Dyffryn, Ceredigion
- Dyffryn, Pembrokeshire
- Dyffryn, Vale of Glamorgan
  - Dyffryn Gardens
- Dyffryn Cellwen, Neath Port Talbot
- Dyffryn Clydach, Neath Port Talbot

== People ==
- Baron Dufferin and Claneboye, title in the Peerage of Ireland
- Dufferin Roblin (1917–2010), Canadian businessman and politician, 14th Premier of Manitoba
- Frederick Hamilton-Temple-Blackwood, 1st Marquess of Dufferin and Ava (1826–1902), known as Lord Dufferin, Governor-General of Canada and Viceroy of India

== Bridges ==
- Dufferin Street bridges in Toronto, Ontario, Canada
- Malviya Bridge over the Ganges at Varanasi, India, originally named the Dufferin Bridge.

== Ships ==
- HMIS Dufferin, a Royal Indian Marine ship active in World War I
- Training Ship Dufferin, a training ship based in Mumbai, renamed Training Ship Chanakya
