= Hardwood Island (Saint Patrick Parish NB) =

Island in New Brunswick, Canada

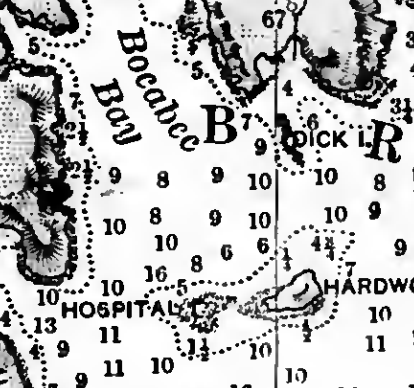
- Hospital Island and Hardwood Island

Geography
- Location: Bay of Fundy
- Area: 14.2 ha (35 acres)
- Highest elevation: 9 m (30 ft)

Administration
- Canada
- Province: New Brunswick
- County: Charlotte
- Parish: Saint Patrick Parish

Hardwood Island is an undeveloped island in the Saint Patrick Parish of Charlotte County, New Brunswick, Canada in the Bay of Fundy.

It is adjacent and "almost adjoined by ledges" to the much smaller Hospital Island, originally known as "Little Hardwood Island", which became a prominent quarantine station for incoming Irish immigrants.

In 1795, the McMaster brothers purchased Hardwood Island, Hog Island and Long Island.

It was nominated to become an Ecological Reserve due to its diversity of birds including great blue heron, osprey and Herring gullss. In 1994, the breeding colony of common eiders on Hardwood Island saw half its females killed, with investigation uncovering both predators and Pasteurella multocida bacterial infection.

In September 1997, the island was used for dye dispersion trials in Passamaquoddy Bay, seeking to trace the route of sea louse pesticides.

In 2020, one of the largest Great White Sharks recorded was seen off the coast of Hardwood Island.
