= Andersonville, New Brunswick =

Coordinates: 45.421778°N 67.251389°W

Location of Andersonville in New Brunswick

Andersonville is a rural community in Saint James Parish, Charlotte County, New Brunswick, Canada. Andersonville intersects with Route 3, Route 630, and Route 755.

== See also ==
- List of communities in New Brunswick
