= Rollingdam =

Rollingdam (or Rolling Dam) is the name of a village in Dumbarton Parish, Charlotte County, New Brunswick, Canada.

Settled around 1830, it was named for a former dam that was built to protect lumber from the rocks. It is near Birney's Lake.

There was a Canadian Pacific Railroad station in Rollingdam.

There used to be a dam across the Digdeguash River, giving rise to the village of Rollingdam, where a covered bridge still crosses the river.

In 2019, Galway Metals announced a significant gold deposit found near Rollingdam, deemed to be the largest in the province.
