= New Brunswick Route 730 =

Highway in New Brunswick, Canada

Coordinates: 45.301215°N 67.365417°W

Route 730

Route information
- Maintained by New Brunswick Department of Transportation
- Length: 15 km (9.3 mi)

Major junctions
- East end: Route 3 in DeWolfe
- West end: Route 725 in Upper Little Ridge

Location
- Country: Canada
- Province: New Brunswick

Highway system
- Provincial highways in New Brunswick; Former routes
← Route 725	→ Route 735

Route 730 is a 14.9-kilometre (9.3 mi) long mostly north–south secondary highway in the south-western portion of New Brunswick, Canada. Most of the route is in Charlotte County.

The route starts at Route 3 in DeWolfe, where it travels west to Route 745 south of Oak Hill. Continuing, the road travels through a mostly forested area to the northern terminus of Route 740 in the community of Basswood Ridge. Here, the road turns southwest as it passes through Scotch Ridge as it crosses Route 735. From here, the route passes by Pomeroy Ridge before ending in Upper Little Ridge close to the northern terminus of Route 725.
