= Saint David Parish, New Brunswick =

Coordinates: 45.280986°N 67.184873°W

Saint David St. David
- Parish
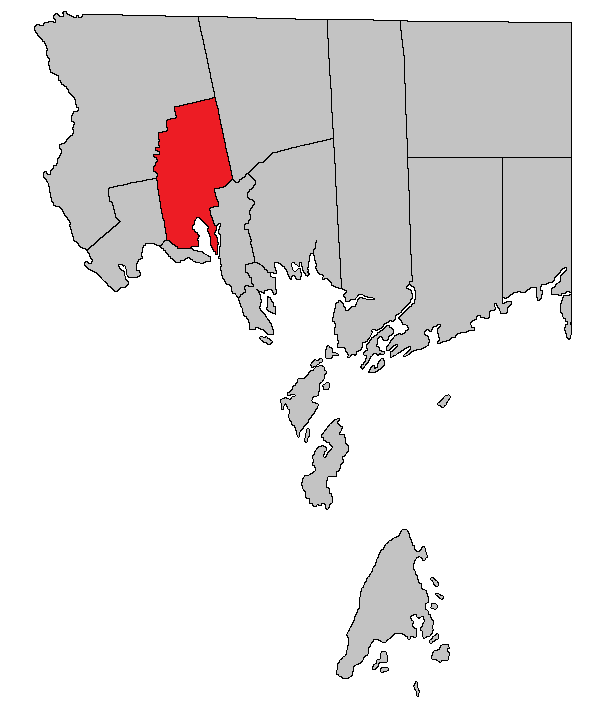
- Location within Charlotte County.
- Country: Canada
- Province: New Brunswick
- County: Charlotte County
- Erected: 1786

Area
  - Land: 190.39 km^{2} (73.51 sq mi)

Population (2021)
  - Total: 1,470
  - Density: 7.7/km^{2} (20/sq mi)
  - Change 2016-2021: ▼3.9%
  - Dwellings: 725
- Time zone: UTC-4 (AST)
  - Summer (DST): UTC-3 (ADT)

Saint David is a geographic parish in Charlotte County, New Brunswick, Canada, (Note: The Territorial Division Act divides the province into 152 parishes, the cities of Saint John and Fredericton, and one town of Grand Falls. The Interpretation Act clarifies that parishes include any local government within their borders.) located northeast of St. Stephen and northwest of Saint Andrews.

For governance purposes, most of the parish is part of the town of the Municipal District of St. Stephen, with Tower Hill and Honeydale belonging to the Southwest rural district, both of which are members of the Southwest New Brunswick Service Commission.

Prior to the 2023 governance reform, it comprised a single local service district (LSD), which was a member of the Southwest New Brunswick Service Commission (SNBSC).

The Census subdivision of the same name shares the parish's boundaries.

== Origin of the name ==
William Francis Ganong believed the name suggested by other Saint names in the area. Five of the original six mainland parishes of Charlotte County used names of major saints recognised by the Church of England: Andrew (Scotland), David (Wales), George (England), Patrick (Ireland), and Stephen.

== History ==
Saint David was erected in 1786 as one of the original parishes of Charlotte County.

== Boundaries ==
Saint David Parish is bounded:

- on the north by a line beginning at a point about 1.2 kilometres west of the junction of Richardson Road and Route 755 and about 450 metres north of Scott Road, then running easterly past Route 127 to strike the Digdeguash River;
- on the east by a line beginning at the Digdeguash River on the prolongation of the eastern line of grants along the Board Road, then running southerly along the prolongation and the grant lines to a point about 350 metres northwesterly of the junction of Wilson Road and Route 127, then southwesterly along the southeastern line of a grant to John Cotterell, then taking a short switchback to the Waweig River to the southern line of a grant to John McGuire, then westerly along the McGuire grant line and its prolongation past the Board Road to the rear line of the tier of grants behind the Oak Bay tier, then southerly along the tier just past Route 760 to the southeastern corner of a grant to James Christy, then westerly along the Christy grant to its southwestern corner, about 175 metres northeasterly of the junction of Board Road and Route 760, then southerly along the rear line of the Oak Bay grants to the Waweig River, then down the Waweig to its mouth;
- on the south and southwest by Oak Bay, Pagans Cove, and the rear line of grants fronting on the St. Croix River to a point about 400 metres east of the Old Bay Road;
- on the west by a line running along the rear of grants fronting along Route 750 until it strikes the Dennis Stream, then running upstream to a point about 375 metres south of Indian Pond;
- on the northwest by a line running in 1.5-kilometre steps along blocks of the old Cape Ann Association grant, easterly, northerly, easterly, and northerly again to the starting point.

=== Evolution of boundaries ===
Saint David joined the Cape Ann Association block in the north with the Penobscot Association block around Oak Bay and the Admiralty mast reserve between them. Saint David's boundaries have changed the least of the original parishes of Charlotte County.

In 1881 five grants in Oak Bay to the northeast of the junction of Board Road and Route 760 were transferred from Saint Croix.

== Former local service district ==
The local service district of the parish of Saint David comprised the entire parish.

The LSD was established in 1969 to assess for community services, in this case to provide ambulance service after local funeral homes ceased doing so. Fire protection was added in 1970, non-fire related rescue in 2013.

In 2022, the LSD assessed for community and recreation services in addition to the basic LSD services of fire protection, police services, land use planning, emergency measures, and dog control. The taxing authority was 519.00 Saint David.

== Communities ==
Communities at least partly within the parish.

- Bay Road
- Benson Corner
- Central Tower Hill
- Honeydale
- Leverville
- Lower Tower Hill
- Oak Bay
- Oak Haven
- St. David Ridge
- Simpson Corner
- Upper Tower Hill

== Bodies of water ==
Bodies of water (Note: Not including brooks, ponds or coves.) at least partly within the parish.

- Northwest Branch Digdeguash River
- Waweig River
- Dennis Stream
- Gallop Stream
- Oak Bay
- Foster Lake
- Gallop Lake
- Middle Lake
- Moores Mills Lake

== Islands ==
Islands at least partly within the parish.

- McVicar Island
- Spoon Island

== Demographics ==
=== Population ===
Canada census – Saint David community profile

| | 2021 | 2016 | 2011 |
| Population | 1,470 (-3.9% from 2016) | 1,529 (-4.7% from 2011) | 1,605 (+7.1% from 2006) |
| Land area | 190.39 km^{2} (73.51 sq mi) | 190.66 km^{2} (73.61 sq mi) | 189.93 km^{2} (73.33 sq mi) |
| Population density | 7.7/km^{2} (20/sq mi) | 8.0/km^{2} (21/sq mi) | 8.5/km^{2} (22/sq mi) |
| Median age | 51.6 (M: 51.2, F: 52) | 50.5 (M: 50.9, F: 50.0) | 47.8 (M: 47.9, F: 47.6) |
| Private dwellings | 640 (total) | 743 (total) | 787 (total) |
| Median household income | | $54,240 |

References: 2021 2016 2011

Historical Census Data - Saint David Parish, New Brunswick

| Year | Pop. | ±% |
|---|---|---|
| 1991 | 1,585 | — |
| 1996 | 1,641 | +3.5% |

| Year | Pop. | ±% |
|---|---|---|
| 2001 | 1,595 | −2.8% |
| 2006 | 1,499 | −6.0% |

| Year | Pop. | ±% |
|---|---|---|
| 2011 | 1,605 | +7.1% |
| 2016 | 1,529 | −4.7% |

=== Language ===
Canada Census Mother Tongue - Saint David Parish, New Brunswick
| Census | Total | English | | | French | | | English & French | | | Other | | |
| Year | Responses | Count | Trend | Pop % | Count | Trend | Pop % | Count | Trend | Pop % | Count | Trend | Pop % |
| 2011 | 1,590 | 1,530 | ▲5.9% | 96.23% | 40 | ▲37.5% | 2.52% | 5 | ▼50.0% | 0.31% | 15 | ▼25.0% | 0.94% |
| 2006 | 1,495 | 1,440 | ▼7.4% | 96.32% | 25 | ▼16.7% | 1.67% | 10 | ▲ n/a% | 0.67% | 20 | ▲ n/a% | 1.34% |
| 2001 | 1,585 | 1,555 | ▼1.6% | 98.11% | 30 | ▼25.0% | 1.89% | 0 | 0.0% | 0.00% | 0 | ▼100.0% | 0.00% |
| 1996 | 1,630 | 1,580 | n/a | 96.93% | 40 | n/a | 2.45% | 0 | n/a | 0.00% | 10 | n/a | 0.61% |

== Access Routes ==
Highways and numbered routes that run through the parish, including external routes that start or finish at the parish limits:

- Highways
  - Route 1
- Principal Routes
  - Route 170
- Secondary Routes:
  - None
- External Routes:
  - None

== See also ==
- List of parishes in New Brunswick
