= Blackland, Charlotte County =

Coordinates: 45°13′28″N 67°16′44″W

Blackland is a rural unincorporated settlement in Charlotte County, New Brunswick, Canada, that is just north of St. Stephen.
