= Dufferin Parish =

Coordinates: 45.179496°N 67.210236°W

Dufferin
- Parish
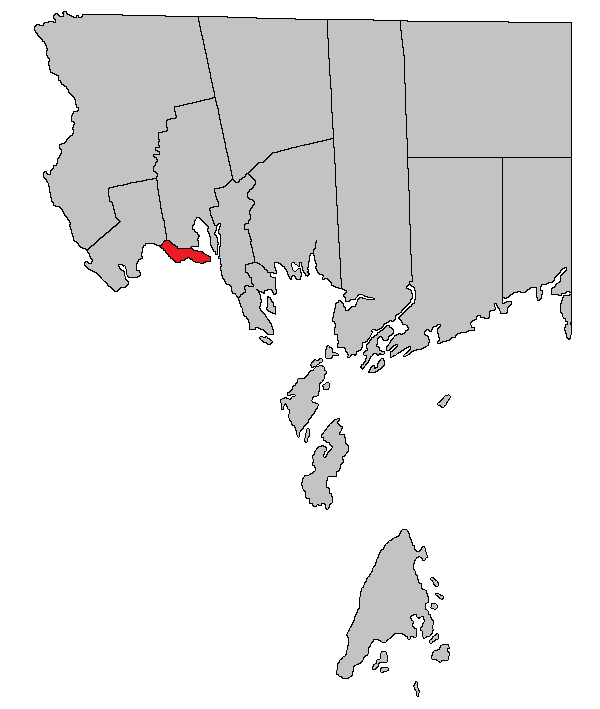
- Location within Charlotte County.
- Country: Canada
- Province: New Brunswick
- County: Charlotte County
- Erected: 1873

Area
  - Land: 12.34 km^{2} (4.76 sq mi)

Population (2021)
  - Total: 565
  - Density: 45.8/km^{2} (119/sq mi)
  - Change 2016-2021: ▼1.4%
  - Dwellings: 265
- Time zone: UTC-4 (AST)
  - Summer (DST): UTC-3 (ADT)

Dufferin is a geographic parish in Charlotte County, New Brunswick, Canada, (Note: The Territorial Division Act divides the province into 152 parishes, the cities of Saint John and Fredericton, and one town of Grand Falls. The Interpretation Act clarifies that parishes include any local government within their borders.) located east of St. Stephen.

For governance purposes, the entire parish is part of the town of the Municipal District of St. Stephen, which is a member of the Southwest New Brunswick Service Commission.

Prior to the 2023 governance reform, it comprised a single local service district (LSD), which was a member of the Southwest New Brunswick Service Commission (SNBSC).

The Census subdivision of the same name shares the parish's boundaries.

== Origin of name ==
The parish was named for the Earl of Dufferin, (Note: Often cited as the 1st Marquess of Dufferin and Ava, a title he didn't hold until 1888.) who was Governor General of Canada at time.

== History ==
Dufferin was erected in 1873 from Saint Stephen Parish.

== Boundaries ==
Dufferin Parish is bounded:

- on the north by the rear line of the tier of grants fronting on the St. Croix River and Pagans Cove;
- on the east by the mouth of Oak Bay;
- on the south by the St. Croix River;
- on the west by the Old Bay Road and Dennis Stream.

== Local service district ==
The local service district of the parish of Dufferin comprised the entire parish.

The LSD was established in 1969 to assess for community services, in this case to provide ambulance service after local funeral homes ceased doing so. Fire protection was added in 1970.

In 2021, the LSD assesses for only the basic LSD services of fire protection, police services, land use planning, emergency measures, and dog control. The taxing authority is 509.00 Dufferin.

== Communities ==
Communities at least partly within the parish.

- Champlain
- Crocker Hill
- The Ledge

== Bodies of water ==
Bodies of water (Note: Not including brooks, ponds or coves.) at least partly within the parish.

- St. Croix River
  - The Narrows
- Oak Bay

== Demographics ==
=== Population ===
Canada census – Dufferin community profile

	2021	2016	2011
Population	565 (-1.4% from 2016)	573 (0.0% from 2011)	573 (+7.1% from 2006)
Land area	12.34 km^{2} (4.76 sq mi)	12.34 km^{2} (4.76 sq mi)	12.40 km^{2} (4.79 sq mi)
Population density	45.8/km^{2} (119/sq mi)	46.4/km^{2} (120/sq mi)	46.2/km^{2} (120/sq mi)
Median age	50.8 (M: 50.0, F: 52.4)	49.6 (M: 48.2, F: 50.2)	49.5 (M: 50.5, F: 47.9)
Private dwellings	265 (total) 243 (occupied)	256 (total)	288 (total)
Median household income	$85,000	$73,387	$.N/A

Notes: Income data for this area has been suppressed for data quality or confidentiality reasons.
References: 2021 2016 2011

Historical Census Data - Dufferin Parish, New Brunswick

Year	Pop.	±%
1991	480	—
1996	451	−6.0%

Year	Pop.	±%
2001	548	+21.5%
2006	535	−2.4%

Year	Pop.	±%
2011	573	+7.1%
2016	573	+0.0%

=== Language ===
Canada Census Mother Tongue - Dufferin Parish, New Brunswick
Census	Total	English			French			English & French			Other		
Year	Responses	Count	Trend	Pop %	Count	Trend	Pop %	Count	Trend	Pop %	Count	Trend	Pop %
2011	575	545	▲3.7%	94.78%	15	▲33.3%	2.61%	0	0.0%	0.00%	15	▲ n/a%	2.61%
2006	535	525	▲1.9%	98.13%	10	▼60.0%	1.87%	0	0.0%	0.00%	0	▼100.0%	0.00%
2001	550	515	▲16.5%	93.64%	25	▲20.0%	4.54%	0	0.0%	0.00%	10	▲ n/a%	1.82%
1996	450	430	n/a	95.56%	20	n/a	4.44%	0	n/a	0.00%	0	n/a	0.00%

== Access Routes ==
Highways and numbered routes that run through the parish, including external routes that start or finish at the parish limits:

- Highways
  - None
- Principal Routes
  - None
- Secondary Routes:
  - None
- External Routes:
  - None

== See also ==
- List of parishes in New Brunswick
