= Valley Road =

Valley Road may refer to:

- Valley Pike, the traditional name for what is now US 11 through the Shenandoah Valley of Virginia
- Valley of Fire Road, road in Clark County, Nevada
- Valley Road Estate, public housing estate in Hong Kong
- Valley Road (MBTA station), light rail stop in Milton, Massachusetts
- The Valley Road, song recorded by Bruce Hornsby
- Valley Road, a rural community located in New Brunswick
- Valley Road, highway in Antigua
- Valley Road, Santa Barbara, California, part of California State Route 192
