= New Brunswick Route 3 =

Highway in New Brunswick, Canada

Route 3

Route information
- Maintained by New Brunswick Department of Transportation
- Length: 95 km (59 mi)
- Existed: 1927–present

Major junctions
- South end: Route 170 / Route 1 near St. Stephen
- Route 4 near McAdam
- North end: Route 2 (TCH) / Route 102 near Longs Creek

Location
- Country: Canada
- Province: New Brunswick

Highway system
- Provincial highways in New Brunswick; Former routes
← Route 2 (TCH)	→ Route 4

Route 3 is 92 kilometres long and goes from Route 170 in St. Stephen to Route 2 (the Trans-Canada Highway) at Longs Creek, near Fredericton.

From St. Stephen, Route 3 goes north along the west bank of Dennis Stream, through the community of Moores Mills. The road turns northeast through Lawrence Station and mostly uninhabited land to meet Route 4 near York Mills. From there, Route 3 continues in a northeasterly direction through Harvey Station, then turns north to the Trans-Canada Highway at Longs Creek.

There have been no major changes or realignments to Route 3 since the 1950s.

== Junction list ==
County	Location	km	mi	Destinations	Notes
Charlotte	St. Stephen	91.5	56.9	Route 170 / Route 1 – Saint Stephen, Calais, ME, Saint John	Southern terminus; interchange with Route 170, exits 9A and B on route 1
Charlotte	Moores Mills	83.8	52.1	Route 745 north – Oak Hill, Canoose	Southern terminus of Route 745
Charlotte	DeWolfe	77.6	48.2	Route 730 west – Oak Hill, Basswood Ridge	Eastern terminus of Route 730
Charlotte	Baillie	68.0	42.3	Route 755 south – Honeydale, Oak Bay	Northern terminus of Route 755
Charlotte	Andersonville	66.7	41.4	Route 630 north – Saint Croix	Southern terminus of Route 630
Charlotte	Lawrence Station	60.6	37.7	Route 127 south – Waweig, Saint Andrews	Northern terminus of Route 127
York	Thomaston Corner	33.0	20.5	Route 4 west – McAdam, Saint Croix	Eastern terminus of Route 4
York	York Mills	29.5	18.3	Route 635 north – Lower Prince William, Kings Landing	Southern terminus of Route 635
York	Harvey Station	18.8	11.7	Route 636 north – Lake George	Southern terminus of Route 636
York	Acton	15.2	9.4	Route 640 north – Yoho, Hanwell	Southern terminus of Route 640
York	Longs Creek	0.0	0.0	Route 2 (TCH) – Edmundston, Fredericton; Route 102 – Pokiok, Fredericton	Northern terminus; two interchanges; Exit 258 on Route 2
1.000 mi = 1.609 km; 1.000 km = 0.621 mi

== See also ==
- List of New Brunswick provincial highways
