= Saint Patrick Parish, New Brunswick =

Coordinates: 45.277544°N 67.068787°W

Saint Patrick St. Patrick
- Parish
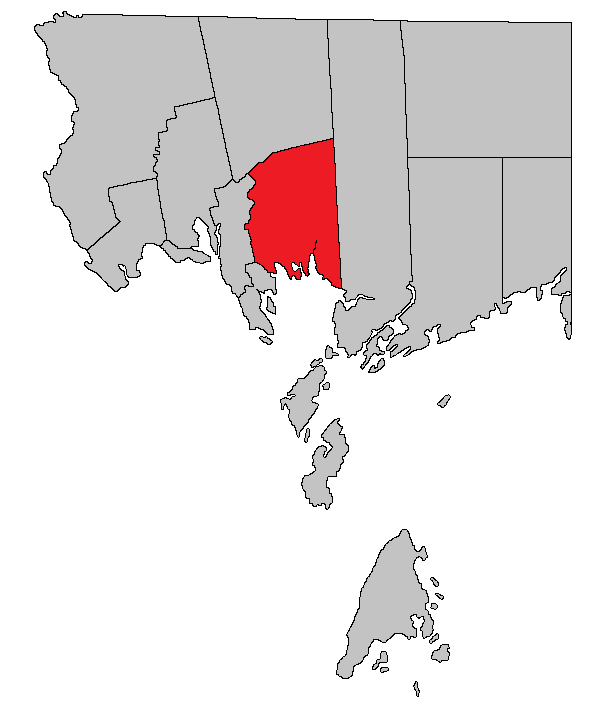
- Location within Charlotte County.
- Country: Canada
- Province: New Brunswick
- County: Charlotte County
- Erected: 1786

Area
  - Land: 236.59 km^{2} (91.35 sq mi)

Population (2021)
  - Total: 710
  - Density: 3/km^{2} (7.8/sq mi)
  - Change 2016-2021: ▲3.0%
  - Dwellings: 408
- Time zone: UTC-4 (AST)
  - Summer (DST): UTC-3 (ADT)

Saint Patrick is a geographic parish in Charlotte County, New Brunswick, Canada, (Note: The Territorial Division Act divides the province into 152 parishes, the cities of Saint John and Fredericton, and one town of Grand Falls. The Interpretation Act clarifies that parishes include any local government within their borders.) located west of St. George and Saint Andrews.

For governance purposes, the southeastern corner around Digdeguash and Bethel is part of the incorporated rural community of Eastern Charlotte, with the remainder belonging to the Southwest rural district, both of which are members of the Southwest New Brunswick Service Commission.

Prior to the 2023 governance reform, it comprised a single local service district (LSD), which was a member of the Southwest New Brunswick Service Commission (SNBSC).

The Census subdivision of the same name shares the parish's boundaries.

== Origin of name ==
Historian William F. Ganong believed the name suggested by other Saint names in the area.

Five of the original six mainland parishes of Charlotte County used names of major saints recognised by the Church of England: Andrew (Scotland), David (Wales), George (England), Patrick (Ireland), and Stephen.

== History ==
Saint Patrick was erected in 1786 as one of Charlotte County's original parishes, including parts of Saint Croix Parish but not all of modern Saint Patrick.

== Boundaries ==
Saint Patrick Parish is bounded:

- on the north by a line beginning about 300 metres southeast of the junction of Whittier Road, Birneys Lake Road, and Route 770, at the northwestern corner of a grant to Chas. Burns, then running east-northeasterly along the Burns grant and its prolongation to a point about 2.7 kilometres northeast of Bonny River Lake;
- on the east by a line beginning on the prolongation of the rear line of a grant to John Carson, northwest of Sherard Beach, then southerly along the prolongation, the Carson grant, and its prolongation the shore near the western end of Shore Road;
- on the south by Passamaquoddy Bay, Big Bay, and Birch Cove
- on the southwest by the southwestern line of a grant to Francis Welsh, then a line running from the western corner of the Welsh grant to the southwestern corner of a grant to Peter Sime, about midway between the South Glenelg Road and the Frye Road where it meets the southern end of Gibson Lake;
- on the west by a line running northerly along the Sime grant and its prolongation nearly to Route 1, then easterly about 150 metres, then northerly to Bonaparte Lake, then generally northerly along grant lines to Eastman Lake, northeasterly to Twin Lakes, then following the zigzagging western line of a 2500-acre grant to James Allanshaw to a point about 900 metres west of Doyle Lake, on the southernmost corner of a grant to John H. Armstrong;
- on the northwest by a line running northeasterly along the Armstrong grant to its eastern corner, about 1.1 kilometres past the Route 760 bridge over the North Branch Campbell Brook, then northwesterly along the northeastern line of the Armstrong grant and its prolongation to a point near the old railway, about 75 metres south of Wilson Road at the western corner of a grant to Jeremiah Sprague, then northeasterly along the Sprague grant to the Digdeguash River, then downstream about 300 metres to the northern line of a grant to John Strang, then northeasterly to the northern corner of the Strang grant, then southeasterly about 50 metres to the starting point;
- including Hardwood Island, Hospital Island, and any islands closer to shore.

=== Evolution of boundaries ===
The southern line of the Cape Ann Association grant in Saint David Parish was prolonged eastward to the Saint John County to provide the northern line of all parishes in the eastern part of Charlotte County; in Saint Patrick's case the line cut through McMinn and south of Birneys Lake. The eastern and southern lines were the same, while the western line ran from north of Libbey Lane straight to Mitchell Brook near Birch Cove, cutting through Saint Croix Parish and putting a strip of southwestern Saint Patrick in Saint Andrews Parish that would be inherited by Saint Croix Parish when it was erected.

In 1814 the parish was extended north to the county line.

In 1856 the northern part of Saint Patrick was erected as Dumbarton Parish.

In 1881 an area around Cathcart Road, Giles Road, and Armstrong Mill Road was transferred to Saint Croix Parish.

In 1896 the southern part of the boundary with Saint Croix was moved west, transferring the remainder of modern Saint Patrick. (Note: The new boundary line reads as if there was a clerical error replacing a reference to the old boundary with a reference to the eastern line of Saint David Parish in the north. The boundary certainly makes more sense if one assumes such an error.)

In 1958 the boundary with Saint Croix was altered to run entirely along grant lines, transferring small areas to Saint Croix.

== Local service district ==
The local service district of the parish of Saint Patrick comprised the entire parish.

The LSD was established in 1970 to assess for fire protection. First aid and ambulance services were added in 1975.

In 2022, Saint Patrick assessed for only the basic LSD services of fire protection, police services, land use planning, emergency measures, and dog control. The taxing authority was 516.00 Saint Patrick.

== Communities ==
Communities at least partly within the parish.

- Bethel
- Bocabec
- Bocabec Cove
- Digdeguash
- Elmsville
- Johnson Settlement
- Kerrs Ridge
- McMinn

== Bodies of water ==
Bodies of water (Note: Not including brooks, ponds or coves.) at least partly within the parish.

- Bocabec River
- Bonny River
- Digdeguash River
- Clarence Stream
- Big Bay
- Passamaquoddy Bay
- Digdeguash Basin
- more than twenty officially named lakes

== Islands ==
Islands at least partly within the parish.

- Dicks Island
- Gird Island
- Hardwood Island
- Hog Island
- Hospital Island
- Long Island
- MacDougalls Island

== Other notable places ==
Parks, historic sites, and other noteworthy places at least partly within the parish.

- Caughey-Taylor Nature Preserve
- Caughey-Taylor Protected Natural Area
- Ovenhead Protected Natural Area

== Demographics ==
=== Population ===
Canada census – Saint Patrick community profile

	2021	2016	2011
Population	710 (+3.0% from 2016)	689 (+6.5% from 2011)	647 (-10.3% from 2006)
Land area	236.59 km^{2} (91.35 sq mi)	236.89 km^{2} (91.46 sq mi)	236.88 km^{2} (91.46 sq mi)
Population density	3.0/km^{2} (7.8/sq mi)	2.9/km^{2} (7.5/sq mi)	2.7/km^{2} (7.0/sq mi)
Median age	56 (M: 55.6, F: 56.4)	53.9 (M: 53.2, F: 54.1)	48.5 (M: 50.1, F: 47.8)
Private dwellings	325 (total)	545 (total)	349 (total)
Median household income		$.N/A	$.N/A

Notes: 2011 income data for this area has been suppressed for data quality or confidentiality reasons.
References: 2021 2016 2011

Historical Census Data - Saint Patrick Parish, New Brunswick

Year	Pop.	±%
1991	656	—
1996	653	−0.5%

Year	Pop.	±%
2001	677	+3.7%
2006	721	+6.5%

Year	Pop.	±%
2011	647	−10.3%
2016	689	+6.5%

=== Language ===
Canada Census Mother Tongue - Saint Patrick Parish, New Brunswick
Census	Total	English			French			English & French			Other		
Year	Responses	Count	Trend	Pop %	Count	Trend	Pop %	Count	Trend	Pop %	Count	Trend	Pop %
2011	645	625	▼10.7%	96.90%	15	0.0%	2.33%	0	0.0%	0.00%	5	▲ n/a%	0.77%
2006	715	700	▲7.9%	97.90%	15	▲ n/a%	2.10%	0	▼100.0%	0.00%	0	▼100.0%	0.00%
2001	670	645	▲5.4%	96.27%	0	0.0%	0.00%	10	▲ n/a%	1.49%	15	▼50.0%	2.24%
1996	640	610	n/a	95.31%	0	n/a	0.00%	0	n/a	0.00%	30	n/a	4.69%

== Access Routes ==
Highways and numbered routes that run through the parish, including external routes that start or finish at the parish limits:

- Highways
  - Route 1
- Principal Routes
  - Route 127
- Secondary Routes:
  - Route 760
  - Route 770
- External Routes:
  - None

== See also ==
- List of parishes in New Brunswick
