= New Brunswick Route 750 =

Highway in New Brunswick, Canada

Coordinates: 45.306587°N 67.257957°W

Route 750

Route information
- Maintained by New Brunswick Department of Transportation
- Length: 19 km (12 mi)

Major junctions
- North end: Route 755 of Honeydale
- South end: Route 170 in Saint Stephen

Location
- Country: Canada
- Province: New Brunswick

Highway system
- Provincial highways in New Brunswick; Former routes
← Route 745	→ Route 755

Route 750 is a 19-kilometre (12 mi) long mostly north–south secondary highway in the southwestern portion of New Brunswick, Canada. Most of the route is in Charlotte County.

The route starts in the community of Honeydale at Route 755, where it travels southwest through a densely wooded area crossing the Canoose Stream several times. As the road continues, it passes between Foster Lake and Middle Lake. As it runs through Moores Mills, it passes Moores Mills Lake close to Route 3. The road continues almost directly south to Maxwell Crossing and Valley Road before running under Route 1 and ending at Route 170 in Saint Stephen.
