= Honeydale, New Brunswick =

Honeydale
- Unincorporated community
- Location within New Brunswick.
- Coordinates: 45.361504°N 67.206363°W
- Country: Canada
- Province: New Brunswick
- County: Charlotte
- Parish: Saint David
- Electoral Districts Federal: New Brunswick Southwest
- Provincial: Charlotte-Campobello

Government
  - Type: Local service district
- Time zone: UTC-4 (AST)
  - Summer (DST): UTC-3 (ADT)
- Postal code(s): E5A
- Area code: 506
- Highways: Route 750; Route 755

Honeydale is a small community in Saint David Parish, Charlotte County, New Brunswick, Canada. The Road is at the northern terminus of Route 750 and Route 755. It is located 3.2 km (2.0 mi) NW of Upper Tower Hill.

== History ==
It was first called Green Meadows, but a local storekeeper named George F. Beach started keeping honeybees, so the railroad men that worked on the tracks started calling it Honeydale. The name was made official in 1910.

== See also ==
- List of communities in New Brunswick
