= New Brunswick Route 725 =

Highway in New Brunswick, Canada

Coordinates: 45.210101°N 67.40387°W

Route 725

Route information
- Maintained by New Brunswick Department of Transportation
- Length: 19 km (12 mi)

Major junctions
- North end: Route 730 in Upper Little Ridge
- South end: Route 735 / Route 740 in Five Corners

Location
- Country: Canada
- Province: New Brunswick

Highway system
- Provincial highways in New Brunswick; Former routes
← Route 715	→ Route 730

Route 725 is a 19.2-kilometre (11.9 mi) long mostly north–south secondary highway in the southwestern portion of New Brunswick, Canada. Most of the route is in Charlotte County.

The route starts at a dead end at the Canada–US border northwest of Upper Little Ridge. The road travels southeast through a mostly forested area to the southern terminus of Route 730 then through the communities of Upper Little Ridge, Little Ridge, and Lower Little Ridge. The road then begins to turn east, passes Barter Settlement, and ends in Five Corners just outside Saint Stephen at the southern terminus of Route 735 and the eastern terminus of Route 740.
