= Lawrence Station, New Brunswick =

Coordinates: 45.426°N 67.180°W

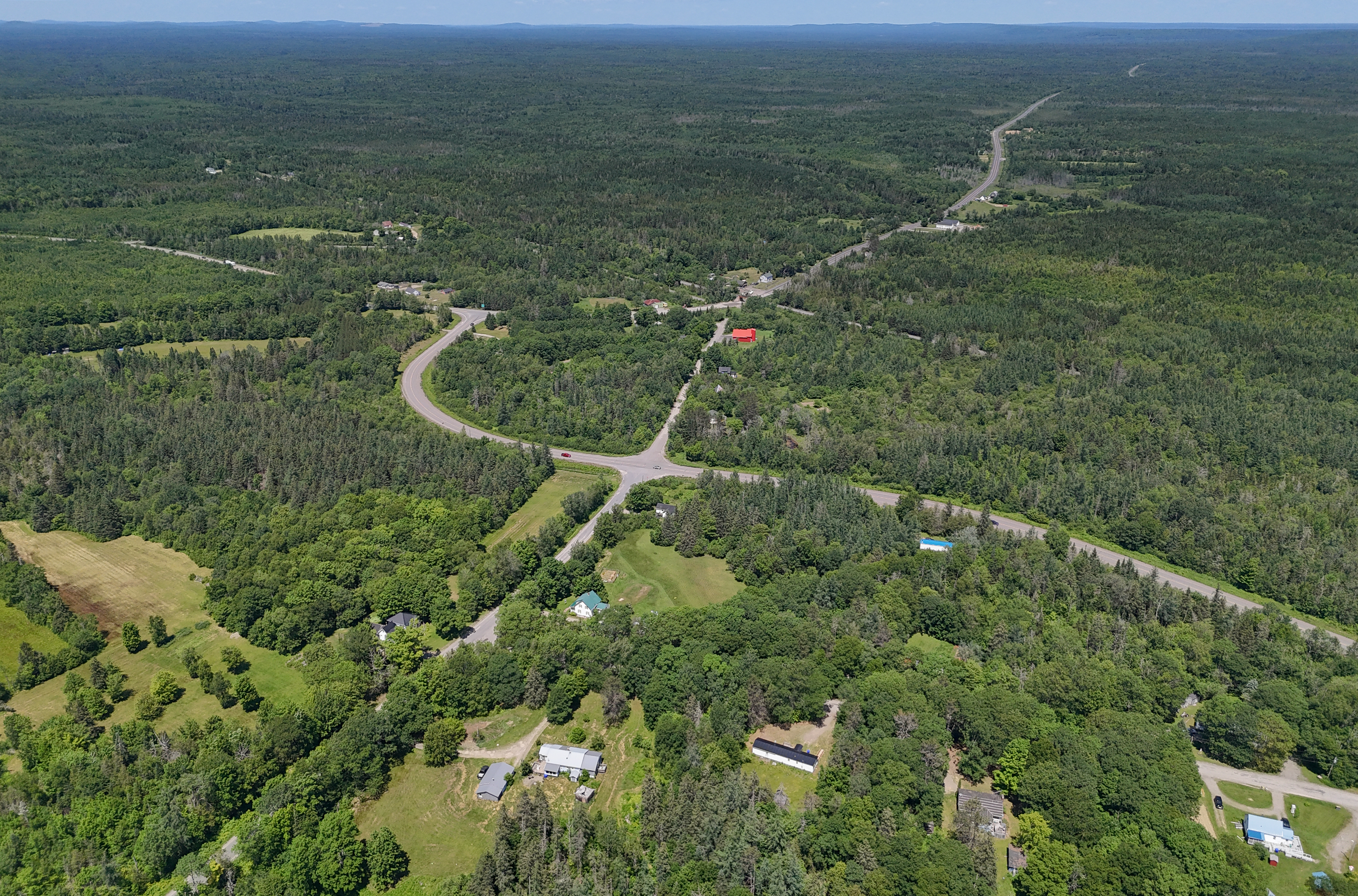
Aerial view

Location of Lawrence Station in New Brunswick

Lawrence Station is a settlement in New Brunswick. Lawrence Station centers on the intersection of Route 3 and Route 127.

Lawrence Station, New Brunswick, is a small settlement known for its historical significance and rural charm. It is located at the intersection of Route 3 and Route 127 in Charlotte County^{1}. Historically, it was an important stop on the St. Andrews and Quebec Railway, named after Wheeler Lawrence in 1853^{2}. The area was primarily a farming and lumbering community in the late 19th century^{2}.

== See also ==
- List of communities in New Brunswick
