= New Brunswick Route 630 =

Highway in New Brunswick, Canada

Coordinates: 45.667325°N 67.453308°W

Route 630

Route information
- Maintained by New Brunswick Department of Transportation
- Length: 59 km (37 mi)

Major junctions
- North end: Route 122 in Lakeland Ridges
- Route 4 near St. Croix
- South end: Route 3 in Andersonville

Location
- Country: Canada
- Province: New Brunswick

Highway system
- Provincial highways in New Brunswick; Former routes
← Route 628	→ Route 635

Route 630 is a 59.4-kilometre (36.9 mi) long mostly north–south secondary highway in McAdam Parish, New Brunswick, Canada.

The route starts at Route 122 in Lakeland Ridges where it travels south through a sparsely populated area past Carroll Ridge and past several lakes including Amelia Lake, Moose Lake, Sixth Lake, Fifth Lake, East Brook Lake, and Spednic Lake on the Canada/US Border. The road passes First Lake before crossing Route 4 near St. Croix. The road continues through a mostly treed area to Meredith Settlement before ending in Andersonville at Route 3.

in 2013, Route 630 was nominated for the worst road in Atlantic Canada.
