= Charlotte County Gaol =

Two prisons in New Brunswick, Canada

Coordinates: 45.0754°N 67.0491°W

Charlotte Country Gaol is a prison originally established in 1786.

== The First Charlotte County Gaol ==
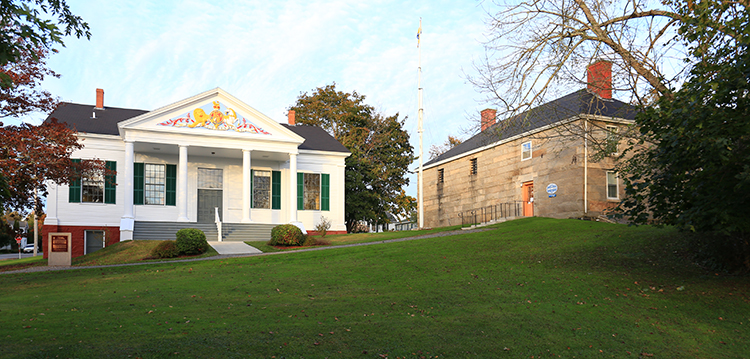
Charlotte County Jail and Courthouse

The first prison in Charlotte County, New Brunswick was located in St. Andrews, New Brunswick on Water Street near where the current town hall is today. Built in 1786, just three years after the town was settled, it was a wooden building that consisted of four cells on the bottom floor and a courthouse on the upper floor. Since the floors in the cells were only packed dirt, prisoners found that they could readily escape custody. Eventually so many escaped that in 1828 the Sheriff was sued, and thus an act was passed to erect a more suitable prison elsewhere. The old building was sold to the town of St. Andrews and converted into a town hall and market house until it burned down in 1872.

== The Second Charlotte County Gaol ==
The next prison, now known as the "Old Gaol," was constructed in an attempt to correct all that was wrong about the previous one. It was built in 1832 on Frederick Street in St. Andrews at the cost of £3,393, a very large sum for the time. Massive slabs of gray granite were cut in Perry, Maine and laid as the floors, ceilings and walls of the prison. Cell doors were made of solid iron, each with a sliding bolt to keep the door closed at all times. The only source of light was the small hole in the door used for delivering food to the prisoners and a small window measuring four inches wide and twelve inches high. Doorways were made very narrow so that a prisoner, no matter their size, would have trouble overpowering the Gaoler if they were being let out of the cell for any reason. The only source of heat was a small wood stove at the end of the corridor outside of the cells, leading a Gaoler in the 1930s to add wooden walls to the cells in an effort to keep them warmer. Unfortunately, this approach led the cells to be only colder as it kept the warmth of the stove outside of the cells. These ten cells were used exclusively for male prisoners. They occupy the first floor of the Gaol and are six by eight feet in size. The cells are cold, claustrophobic and bereft of any comfort, which was the exact intention of their construction.

Upstairs in the Gaol were four cells intended for women, children and debtors. These were much more comfortable than the ones downstairs as they were larger in size and had larger windows for more light. Children would be admitted to prison if their mother had committed a crime and there were no other caretakers available. Debtors made up a large bulk of the prison population until the practice of imprisoning debtors ended in 1939.

The Old Gaol was used, though only as a place of temporary custody, until 1979, despite protests of its unacceptable conditions from the public and Gaolers as early as the 1940s. Today, the Old Gaol houses the Charlotte County Archives and its extensive collections. The downstairs cells remain unchanged and are open to the public.

== See also ==
- Charlotte County Court House
