= New Brunswick Route 745 =

Highway in New Brunswick, Canada

Coordinates: 45.386516°N 67.379494°W

Route 745

Route information
- Maintained by New Brunswick Department of Transportation
- Length: 23.4 km (14.5 mi)

Major junctions
- North end: north of Beaconsfield
- South end: Route 3 in Moores Mills

Location
- Country: Canada
- Province: New Brunswick

Highway system
- Provincial highways in New Brunswick; Former routes
← Route 740	→ Route 750

Route 745 is a 23-kilometre (14 mi) long mostly north–south secondary highway in the southwestern portion of New Brunswick, Canada. Most of the route is in Charlotte County.

The route starts in a densely wooded area north of Beaconsfield and travels southeast over the Canoose Stream in Canoose. Continuing, the road enters Oak Hill and continues to Route 730. The road continues and passes Cranberry Lake and ends at Route 3 between Moores Mills and Old Ridge.
