= Charlotte County Court House =

Historic building in New Brunswick, Canada

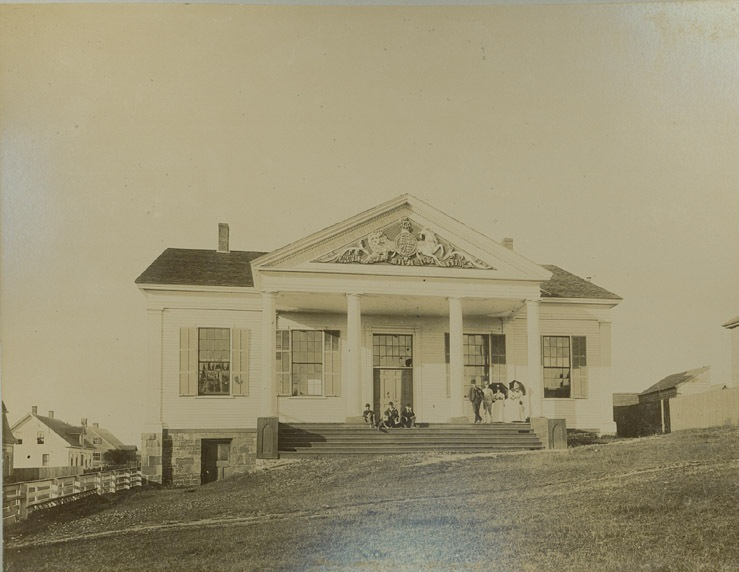
- Charlotte County Court House in 1895
- Interactive map of the Charlotte County Court House area

General information
- Architectural style: Classical-Revival
- Location: 123 Frederick St., St. Andrews, New Brunswick, Canada
- Coordinates: 45°4′32.47″N 67°2′57.26″W
- Current tenants: Charlotte County Archives, St. Andrews Civic Trust
- Construction started: 1839
- Completed: 1840

Design and construction
- Architect: Thomas Berry

National Historic Site of Canada
- Official name: Charlotte County Court House National Historic Site of Canada
- Designated: 1981

New Brunswick Heritage Conservation Act
- Type: Provincial Heritage Place
- Designated: 1997

The Charlotte County Court House (French: Palais de justice du comté de Charlotte) is a former court house located in St. Andrews, New Brunswick, Canada. It served as the local seat of the Court of Queen's Bench of New Brunswick. It was the oldest court house in Canada still in continuous use until 2016, when court cases stopped being heard in St. Andrews.

== History ==
The court house was constructed in 1840 adjacent to the Charlotte County Gaol, and was designed by architect Thomas Berry. The building features a pedimented portico, onto which a large Royal coat of arms was added in 1858 by Charles Kennedy. In its early years, the building was a focal point for local activities such as elections, fairs, parades, and official visits.

== National Historic Site ==
The building was designated a National Historic Site of Canada in 1981, as the best preserved example in New Brunswick of the typical mid-19th century Maritime courthouse. It was subsequently also designated under the provincial Historic Sites Protection Act in 1997.

== See also ==
- Charlotte County Archives
