= New Brunswick Route 735 =

Highway in New Brunswick, Canada

Coordinates: 45.266671°N 67.37915°W

Route 735

Route information
- Maintained by New Brunswick Department of Transportation
- Length: 19 km (12 mi)

Major junctions
- North end: Route 730 in Scotch Ridge
- South end: Route 725 / Route 740 in Five Corners

Location
- Country: Canada
- Province: New Brunswick

Highway system
- Provincial highways in New Brunswick; Former routes
← Route 730	→ Route 740

Route 735 is a 19.4-kilometre (12.1 mi) long mostly north–south secondary highway in the southwestern portion of New Brunswick, Canada. Most of the route is in Charlotte County.

The route starts at the Canada/US Border in a densely wooded area near King Brook Lake. The road travels southeast through Gleason Road and Pomeroy Ridge to Route 730 in Scotch Ridge. Continuing, the road passes Potters Lake and Kendricks Lake near Barter Settlement. The final stretch of the route passes through Mayfield before ending in Five Corners at the eastern terminus of Route 725 and the southern terminus of Route 740 near Saint Stephen.
