= Waweig, New Brunswick =

Community in New Brunswick, Canada

Waweig
- Rural community
- Interactive map of Waweig
- Coordinates: 45°15′00″N 67°07′00″W
- Country: Canada
- Province: New Brunswick
- County: Charlotte County
- Elevation: 86 m (282 ft)
- Time zone: UTC−4 (Atlantic Standard Time)
  - Summer (DST): UTC−3 (Atlantic Daylight Time)
- Area code: 506
- Highways: Route 127, Route 760

Waweig is a Canadian rural community in Charlotte County, New Brunswick. Waweig is centered on the intersection of Route 760 and Route 127.

== See also ==
- List of communities in New Brunswick
