= New Brunswick Route 755 =

Highway in New Brunswick, Canada

Coordinates: 45.326746°N 67.195044°W

Route 755

Route information
- Maintained by New Brunswick Department of Transportation
- Length: 22 km (14 mi)

Major junctions
- North end: Route 3 of Baillie
- South end: Route 170 in Oak Bay

Location
- Country: Canada
- Province: New Brunswick

Highway system
- Provincial highways in New Brunswick; Former routes
← Route 750	→ Route 760

Route 755 is a 22.4-kilometre (13.9 mi) long mostly north–south secondary highway in the southwestern portion of New Brunswick, Canada. Most of the route is in Charlotte County.

The route starts near the community of Baillie at Route 3, where it travels southwest through a densely wooded area to Honeydale at the northern terminus of Route 750. As the road continues, it passes Upper Tower Hill, Tower Hill and Lower Tower Hill. The road runs under Route 1 before ending at Route 170 in Oak Bay on the east bank of Oak Bay.
