= Scotch Ridge =

Coordinates: 45°17′00″N 67°23′52″W

Scotch Ridge is a small settlement in Charlotte County, New Brunswick, Canada.

In 1803, seventeen Scottish families from Sutherlandshire "accidentally arrived" en route to North Carolina. They were from Lord Reay's fencibles unit raised in 1796 in response to the French Revolutionary Wars.

The 400 settlers were discouraged by what they saw in the area and departed for Nova Scotia, but Scottish merchants from St. Andrews outfitted a vessel to pursue the departing Scotsmen and convince them to return. Robert Pagan was instrumental in settling them, raising 134 pounds sterling for their re-settlement and to bring four further Scottish families from Digby, Nova Scotia. While St. Andrews surveyor Donald MacDonald produced a land survey to settle the newcomers.

They were given land grants, where an isolated Gaelic-speaking community developed. In 1813, Scotch Ridge was removed from St. Stephen Parish, New Brunswick and became part of Saint James Parish, New Brunswick, as the Sutherland clan further settled Little Ridge to the south, and Oak Hill, Basswood Ridge and Pomeroy Ridge to the north.

By 1866, Scotch Ridge had approximately 30 families, in 1871 it had a population of 200, and in 1898 it had a church and post office though population had dwindled to 100. The church's steeple held a geodetic triangulation marker. Alberta judge and unsuccessful 1911 Victoria, Alberta federal Conservative Party candidate Frederick Augustus Morrison was born in Scotch Ridge.

Clark's Point Preserve is located near Scotch Ridge, and administered by the Nature Trust of New Brunswick.
