= New Brunswick Route 740 =

Highway in New Brunswick, Canada

Coordinates: 45.254589°N 67.323532°W

Route 740

Route information
- Maintained by New Brunswick Department of Transportation
- Length: 13.7 km (8.5 mi)

Major junctions
- North end: Route 730 in Basswood Ridge
- Route 1 in St. Stephen
- South end: Route 725 / Route 735 in Five Corners

Location
- Country: Canada
- Province: New Brunswick

Highway system
- Provincial highways in New Brunswick; Former routes
← Route 735	→ Route 745

Route 740 is a 14-kilometre (8.7 mi) long mostly north–south secondary highway in the southwestern portion of New Brunswick, Canada. Most of the route is in Charlotte County.

The route starts in a densely wooded area in Basswood Ridge at Route 730. The road travels southeast through Hayman Hill, past Blackland, to Heathland and Four Corners before ending in Five Corners at the eastern terminus of Route 725 and the southern terminus of Route 735 close to Saint Stephen.
