= Oak Bay, New Brunswick =

Oak Bay
- Unincorporated community
- Location within New Brunswick.
- Coordinates: 45°13′51″N 67°11′31″W
- Country: Canada
- Province: New Brunswick
- County: Charlotte
- Parish: Saint David
- Electoral Districts Federal: New Brunswick Southwest
- Provincial: Charlotte-Campobello

Government
  - Type: Local service district
- Time zone: UTC-4 (AST)
  - Summer (DST): UTC-3 (ADT)
- Postal code(s): E3L
- Area code: 506
- Highways Route 170: Route 755

Oak Bay (originally Oak Point Bay) is a Canadian rural community in Charlotte County, New Brunswick.

Oak Bay generally refers to the residential areas surrounding the head of Passamaquoddy Bay which is known as Oak Bay.

It is the northernmost section of Passamaquoddy Bay, into which the St. Croix River empties. Its extent fluctuates with the Bay of Fundy tidal changes, so that its northern section changes from approximately 30 feet (9.1 m) in depth at high tide to exposed ocean floor at low tide.

The rural community of Oak Bay lies on the shores of this embayment.

Located in the centre of the bay is Spoon Island, named so as it resembles an overturned spoon.
