= New Brunswick Route 760 =

Highway in New Brunswick, Canada

Coordinates: 45.221529°N 66.943045°W

Route 760

Route information
- Maintained by New Brunswick Department of Transportation
- Length: 37 km (23 mi)

Major junctions
- West end: Route 170 in Simpson Corner
- Route 1 in Bethel
- East end: Route 1 in Saint George

Location
- Country: Canada
- Province: New Brunswick

Highway system
- Provincial highways in New Brunswick; Former routes
← Route 755	→ Route 770

Route 760 is a 37.4-kilometre (23.2 mi) long mostly west–east secondary highway in the southwestern portion of New Brunswick, situated in Canada.

== Route description ==
Most of the route is in Charlotte County.

The route starts in the community of Simpson Corner at Route 170, where it travels northeast through a densely wooded area passing over Route 1 to Route 127 in Waweig. It continues past Doyle Lake to Roix Road. At the bend when the route turns southeast, it begins to follow the Digdeguash River before crossing it on the McGuire Covered Bridge in Elmsville. The road continues through Saint Patrick and Johnson Settlement and passes Digdeguash Lake, Lily Lake. It again crosses Route 1 at exit 45 near Bethel. The route follows a former alignment of Route 1 to a reconfigured exit 52 at Route 1 in Saint George.
