= New Brunswick Route 170 =

Highway in New Brunswick

Route 170

Route information
- Maintained by New Brunswick Department of Transportation
- Length: 17.69 km (10.99 mi)
- Existed: 1984–present

Major junctions
- East end: Route 127 in Waweig
- West end: US 1 / SR 9 in Calais, ME

Location
- Country: Canada
- Province: New Brunswick
- Major cities: St. Stephen

Highway system
- Provincial highways in New Brunswick; Former routes
← Route 165	→ Route 172

Route 170 is an 18 km (11 mi)-long east–west secondary highway in southwest New Brunswick, Canada.

The route's eastern terminus is at an intersection with Route 127 in Gilmans Corner, New Brunswick. From there, it runs west crossing the Waweig River to the small community of Simpson Corner, New Brunswick. Route 170 then crosses Oak Bay and runs until its terminus in St. Stephen.

== Intersecting routes ==
- Route 760 in Simpson Corner
- Route 755 in Oak Bay.
- Route 750 in St. Stephen

== River crossings ==
- Waweig River in Gilmans Corner
- Oak Bay in Oak Bay

== Communities along the Route ==
- Waweig
- Simpson Corner
- Oak Bay
- Benson Corner
- Dufferin
- St. Stephen

== See also ==
- List of New Brunswick provincial highways
- St. Stephen Airport
