= Digdeguash River =

River in New Brunswick, Canada

Coordinates: 45°10′40″N 66°57′35″W

The Digdeguash River is a large river in the West Fundy watershed that empties into the Bay of Fundy in south-western New Brunswick, Canada.

William Francis Ganong attributed its name to the unknown Passamaquoddy phrase Dik-te-quesk.

There used to be a dam across the river, giving rise to the village of Rollingdam, where a covered bridge still crosses the river.
