= New Brunswick Route 127 =

Highway in New Brunswick, Canada

Route 127

Route information
- Maintained by New Brunswick Department of Transportation
- Length: 59.91 km (37.23 mi)
- Existed: 1965.–present

Major junctions
- East end: Route 3 in Lawrence Station
- Route 1 in Gilmans Corner
- West end: Route 1 in Digdeguash

Location
- Country: Canada
- Province: New Brunswick
- Major cities: St Andrews

Highway system
- Provincial highways in New Brunswick; Former routes
| ← Route 126 | → Route 128 |

Route 127 is an East/West provincial highway in the Canadian province of New Brunswick. The highway starts out in Lawrence Station at the intersection of Route 3 The road travels mainly south for almost 60 km through mostly rural communities. The road passes Rickets Island and runs along the Canada/US border as is the main route into St. Andrews, where the road name changes to Bayview Drive and Mowat Drive. In St. Andrews, the highway takes a sharp, almost 180-degree, turn before it finally ends ending in the community of Bocabec.

== Intersecting routes ==
- Route 770 in Leverville
- Route 760 in Waweig
- Route 1 in Gilmans Corner
- Route 170 in Gilmans Corner
- Route 1 in Digedguash

== River crossings ==
- Digdeguash River in Dumbarton
- (unknown river) south of Waweig
- Bocabec River in Bocabec

== Communities along the Route ==
- Watt
- Dumbarton
- Greenock
- Leverville
- Waweig
- Gilmans Corner
- Bayside
- Wileys Corner
- St. Andrews
- Edwards Corner
- Chamcook Lake
- Bocabec Cove

== See also ==
- List of New Brunswick provincial highways
