= St. Stephen, New Brunswick =

Municipal District of St. Stephen
- Town
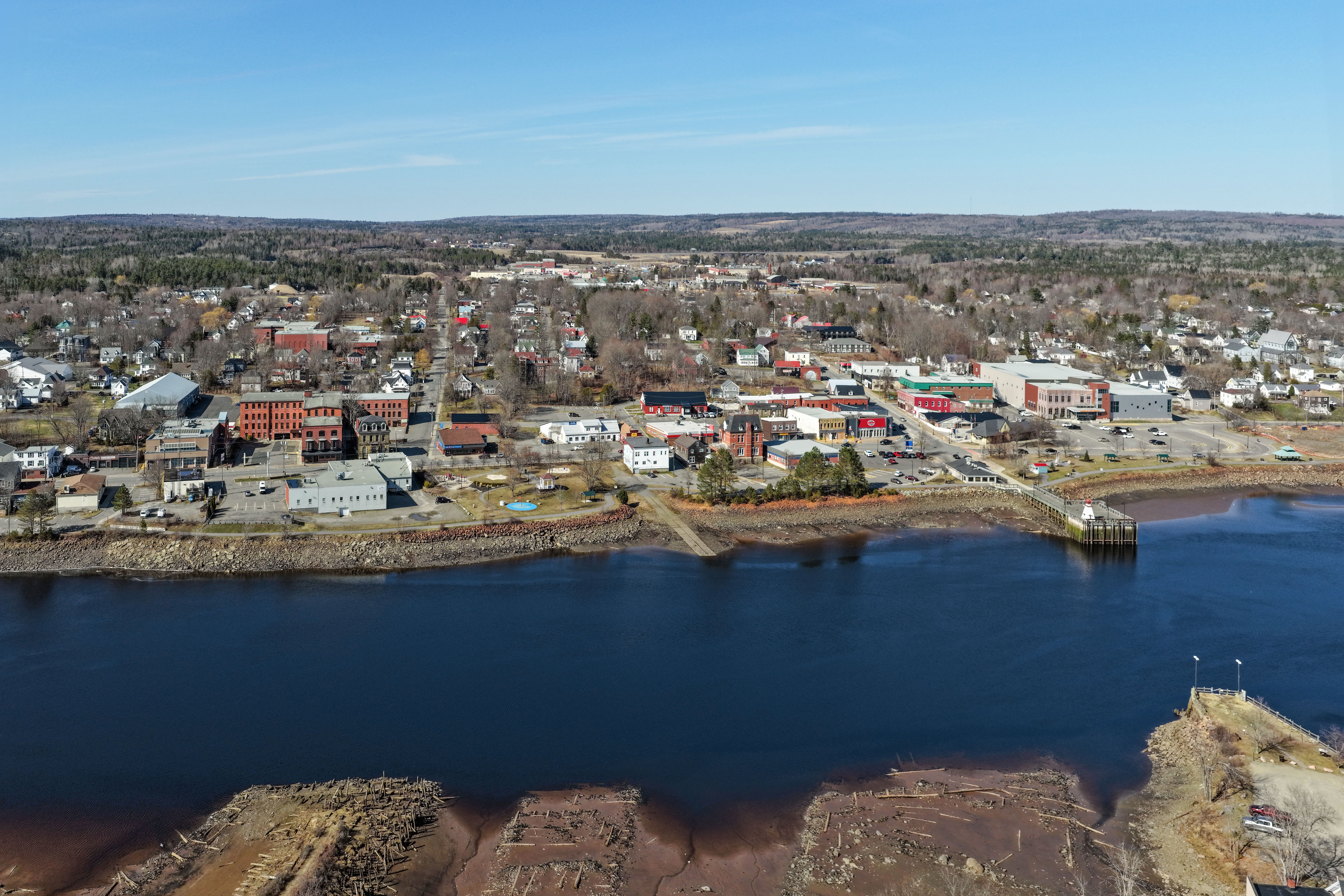
- Motto: Canada's Chocolate Town
- Interactive map of Municipal District of St. Stephen
- Location within New Brunswick. St. Stephen (Canada)
- Coordinates: 45°12′N 67°17′W
- Country: Canada
- Province: New Brunswick
- County: Charlotte
- Settled: 1604
- Incorporated: 1871

Government
  - Type: Town Council
  - Mayor: Steven C. Backman

Area
  - Land: 13.72 km^{2} (5.30 sq mi)

Population (2021)
  - Total: 4,510
  - Density: 328.7/km^{2} (851/sq mi)
  - Change (2016–21): ▲2.2%
  - Dwellings: 2,278
- Time zone: UTC−4 (AST)
  - Summer (DST): UTC−3 (ADT)
- Postal code(s): E3L
- Area code: 506
- Highways Route 1 Route 3 Route 170 US 1: Route 725; Route 740
- NTS Map: 21G3 St. Stephen
- GNBC Code: DAZBZ
- Website: www.town.ststephen.nb.ca

St. Stephen is a Canadian town in Charlotte County, New Brunswick, situated on the east bank of the St. Croix River around the intersection of New Brunswick Route 170 and the southern terminus of New Brunswick Route 3. The St. Croix River marks a section of the Canada–United States border, forming a natural border between Calais, Maine and St. Stephen. U.S. Route 1 parallels the St. Croix river for a few miles, and is accessed from St. Stephen by three cross-border bridges.

On 1 January 2023, St. Stephen annexed all or part of seven local service districts and was renamed the Municipal District of St. Stephen, retaining town status. Revised census figures have not been released.

== History ==
The Peskotomuhkati people (formerly referred to as the Passamaquoddy) were the first to make their home along the St. Croix River. They dispersed and hunted inland in the winter; in the summer, they gathered more closely together on the coast and islands, and primarily harvested seafood, including porpoise. In 1604, French explorer Samuel de Champlain and his men spent a winter here. The Peskotomuhkati were forced off their original lands repeatedly by European settlers since that time.

=== Raid on St. Stephen (1704) ===
During Queen Anne's War, in response to the French Raid on Deerfield, New Englander Major Benjamin Church raided the Acadian villages of Castine, Maine (then known as Penobscot). From the Raid on Castine, Church learned that Michel Chartier was granted the land of present-day St. Stephen and was building a fort at Passamaquoddy Bay. Church and his men arrived at the Passamaquoddy Bay on board the Province Galley, Gosport, Fearly, and several other vessels. Church travelled up the St. Croix River to St. Stephen and, on 7 June 1704, took Chartier by surprise and his family fled into the woods. On 13 June, Church reported they were destroying the crops of the Acadians and the Acadians and Peskotomuhkati fired upon Church's troops, resulting in a three-hour exchange. Church killed and imprisoned 35 Acadians and Peskotomuhkati; one of Church's men was wounded, and the community was pillaged and plundered.

After the Raid on St. Stephen, Church moved on to raid other Acadian villages in the Raid on Grand Pré, the Raid on Piziquid, and the Raid on Chignecto.

== War of 1812 ==
During the War of 1812, the United States and British North America agreed to a ceasefire on the border between St. Stephen and Calais, as "a collision between those whose dwellings are within gunshot of each other would have produced the most unhappy consequences...and the authorities effectually restrained the violence that sometimes springs from rash and intemperate men."

=== Incorporation ===
St. Stephen was officially incorporated as a town in 1871.

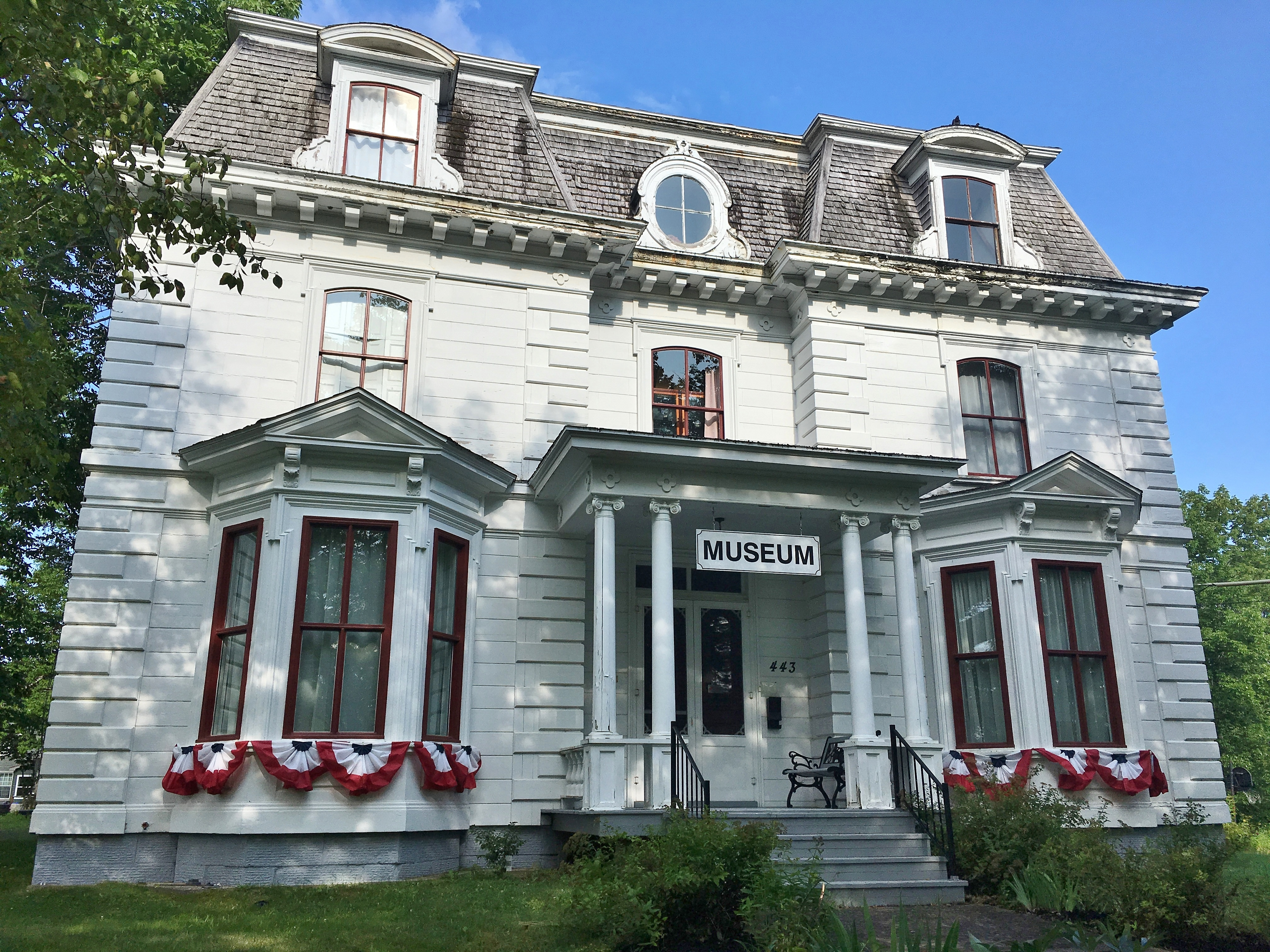
The Charlotte County Museum is located in a house that was built in 1864. (August 2019)

=== Controversy over HBRC railway (1873−1875) ===
Immediately prior to Confederation, the Legislature of New Brunswick passed a bill that incorporated the Houlton Branch Railway Company (HBRC) with the aim to build a railway between Debec, New Brunswick and Houlton, Maine. This was in hopes of completing a portion of the St. Andrews and Quebec Railway. In 1870, the Legislature of New Brunswick passed an Act, which authorized Charlotte County to issue debentures to pay a bonus of $15,000 to the HBRC in order to encourage it to complete the railway. The debenture could only be issued if authorized by a public meeting of the ratepayers of St. Stephen, who would assume the obligation of paying for the interest and principal of the debenture. A majority of the ratepayers of St. Stephen duly passed the necessary vote and the County issued the debenture. Some residents of St. Stephen who opposed the measure challenged the tax assessment in the Supreme Court of New Brunswick, arguing that the provincial Legislature lacked the constitutional authority to authorise a tax to support the building of an international railway, as that would intrude on the exclusive legislative authority of the Parliament of Canada.

In 1873, the Supreme Court of New Brunswick ruled that the provincial taxation statute was unconstitutional, because it intruded on federal jurisdiction over inter-jurisdictional railways. The supporters of the railway measure appealed the case to the Judicial Committee of the Privy Council, at that time the court of last resort for Canada within the British Empire. The Judicial Committee, in the case of Dow v Black, allowed the appeal and held that the taxation statute was within provincial authority.

=== Downtown gutted by fire (1877) ===
In 1877, St. Stephen's business district was almost destroyed by fire when 80 buildings and 13 wharves burned.

=== Economy of the 20th century ===
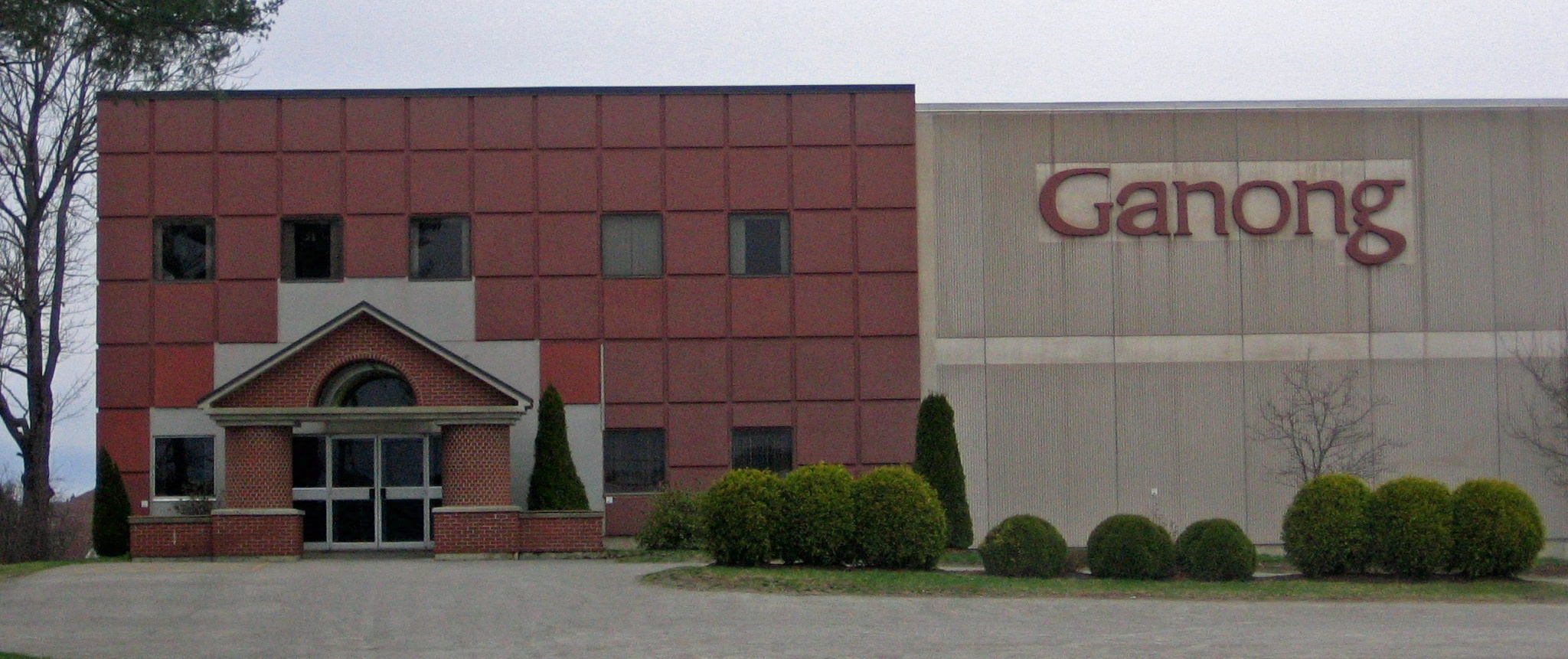
The new Ganong chocolate factory.

Prior to World War II, St. Stephen's local economy was heavily based in the lumber and ship building industry. At the end of the 18th century, there were no fewer than one hundred various dry docks and slips along the river, shared by the cities of Calais and St. Stephen. Prominent families in the area, such as the Merchies and the Todds, ran much of the town's economy due to the monopoly they had on the St. Croix River system. Lumbering companies were located along both the Canadian and American sides of the river, each branding its logs with a unique symbol. By the early 1900s, 200 ships had been built in the St. Croix waters. However, by the end of World War II, the town's main employers were Ganong Bros., Canada's oldest candy company (founded in 1873), and the St. Croix Cotton Mill. Opened in June 1882, the mill became Canada's second-largest textile operation, with 20,000 spindles and its own hydroelectric generating station—the Milltown Dam. Until recently, electricity generated by the Milltown Dam was exported to the United States, connected to a 69kV transmission circuit owned by the Eastern Maine Electric Cooperative, an electric utility serving Calais. In 1957, the textile mill closed, and it was demolished in 1972. At one time, the St. Croix Cotton Mill employed as many as 1200 persons at peak periods. Ganong remains a key employer.

Circa 1866, the Douglas Axe Manufacturing Company built their factory on Dennis Stream. In 1883, it was purchased by E. Broad & Sons, who operated the company until 1895 when a new company was formed under the name of St. Stephen Edge Tool Co. In 1911, Harry Broad formed the Mann Axe & Tool Co. with Charles Heustis as president and manager. With two storeys of the original factory now in use, they acquired the buildings of the Bug Death Chemical Co. On 29 January 1915, the St. Croix Water Power Company and the Sprague's Falls Manufacturing Company Limited petitioned for approval of a dam and power canal and the obstruction, diversion, and use of the waters of the St. Croix River at Grand Falls. The state of Maine and the province of New Brunswick both decided on this matter, as it would affect both communities equally. The decision was made 9 November 1915. The new factory began operation in 1922. The factory was water powered from Dennis Stream and the original Hercules water turbine was still in use. In 1930, the factory became a victim of the Great Depression. It managed to continue operating until 1943, at which time the business finally closed.

=== Municipal amalgamation (1973) ===
In 1973, St. Stephen amalgamated with the town of Milltown to form St. Stephen–Milltown; the name was simplified to St. Stephen in 1975.

=== Chocolate Festival ===
Every August since 1985, the town hosts a week-long Chocolate Fest. The festival mascots are the Great Chocolate Mousse and Tiffany, his wife. The spotlight on chocolate resulted in the opening of The Chocolate Museum in 1999 and its expansion in 2009. In 2000, St. Stephen was given the title of "Canada's Chocolate Town."

=== December 2010 flood ===
On 13 December 2010, a rainstorm caused flooding upstream on a tributary of Dennis Stream. The flood severely impacted businesses on or near King Street. The flood led to widespread layoffs, and the Sobeys store eventually closed down. The flooding was linked to the replacement of a trestle bridge over Dennis Stream with culvert pipes, which local business owners criticized as providing inadequate drainage.

== Demographics ==
In the 2021 Census of Population conducted by Statistics Canada, St. Stephen had a population of 4,510 living in 2,073 of its 2,278 total private dwellings, a change of 2.2% from its 2016 population of 4,415. With a land area of 13.72 km^{2} (5.30 sq mi), it had a population density of 328.7/km^{2} (851.4/sq mi) in 2021.

Canada census – St. Stephen, New Brunswick community profile

	2016	2011
Population	4,415 (-8.3% from 2011)	4,817 (+0.8% from 2006)
Land area	13.52 km^{2} (5.22 sq mi)	13.45 km^{2} (5.19 sq mi)
Population density	326.6/km^{2} (846/sq mi)	358.0/km^{2} (927/sq mi)
Median age	43.9 (M: 42.0, F: 45.5)	42.9 (M: 40.6, F: 45.1)
Private dwellings	2,206 (total)	2,256 (total)
Median household income		$35,675

References: 2016 2011

Historical Census Data – St. Stephen, New Brunswick

Year	Pop.	±%
1901	2,840	—
1911	2,836	−0.1%
1921	3,452	+21.7%
1931	3,437	−0.4%
1941	3,306	−3.8%

Year	Pop.	±%
1951	3,769	+14.0%
1961	3,380	−10.3%
1981	5,138	+52.0%
1986	5,032	−2.1%
1991	4,931	−2.0%

Year	Pop.	±%
1996	4,961	+0.6%
2001	4,667	−5.9%
2006	4,780	+2.4%
2011	4,817	+0.8%
2016	4,415	−8.3%

=== Language ===
Canada Census Mother Tongue – St. Stephen, New Brunswick
Census	Total	English			French			English & French			Other		
Year	Responses	Count	Trend	Pop %	Count	Trend	Pop %	Count	Trend	Pop %	Count	Trend	Pop %
2011	4,710	4,510	▲0.2%	95.75%	100	▼4.8%	2.12%	10	▲ n/a%	0.21%	90	▲20.0%	1.91%
2006	4,680	4,500	▲2.3%	96.15%	105	▼16.0%	2.24%	0	0.0%	0.00%	75	▲275.0%	1.60%
2001	4,545	4,400	▼5.6%	96.81%	125	▼7.4%	2.75%	0	▼100.0%	0.00%	20	▼55.5%	0.44%
1996	4,855	4,660	n/a	95.98%	135	n/a	2.78%	15	n/a	0.31%	45	n/a	0.93%

== Climate ==
The climate of St. Stephen is temperate but is greatly affected by the size of the Bay of Fundy. The Bay is a cool body of water which acts as an air conditioner in the summer and diverts major snow storms in the winter. The Bay never freezes. The average summer temperature is 22 °C, and the average winter temperature is −3.9 °C.

Environment Canada maintains a testing program for water quality at the Milltown Dam generating station.

Climate data for St. Stephen, 1991–2020 normals, extremes 1898–present
Month	Jan	Feb	Mar	Apr	May	Jun	Jul	Aug	Sep	Oct	Nov	Dec	Year
Record high °C (°F)	14.5 (58.1)	19.6 (67.3)	28.6 (83.5)	31.7 (89.1)	34.2 (93.6)	36.0 (96.8)	36.7 (98.1)	37.2 (99.0)	34.7 (94.5)	30.6 (87.1)	24.1 (75.4)	16.7 (62.1)	37.2 (99.0)
Mean daily maximum °C (°F)	−2.1 (28.2)	−0.5 (31.1)	4.0 (39.2)	10.7 (51.3)	17.4 (63.3)	22.1 (71.8)	25.7 (78.3)	25.3 (77.5)	21.3 (70.3)	14.0 (57.2)	7.2 (45.0)	1.2 (34.2)	12.2 (54.0)
Daily mean °C (°F)	−8.0 (17.6)	−6.6 (20.1)	−1.7 (28.9)	4.8 (40.6)	10.9 (51.6)	15.6 (60.1)	19.2 (66.6)	18.6 (65.5)	14.4 (57.9)	8.1 (46.6)	2.3 (36.1)	−3.9 (25.0)	6.2 (43.2)
Mean daily minimum °C (°F)	−13.6 (7.5)	−12.7 (9.1)	−7.3 (18.9)	−1.0 (30.2)	4.2 (39.6)	9.1 (48.4)	12.7 (54.9)	11.9 (53.4)	7.5 (45.5)	2.1 (35.8)	−2.6 (27.3)	−8.9 (16.0)	0.1 (32.2)
Record low °C (°F)	−39.4 (−38.9)	−36.7 (−34.1)	−29.4 (−20.9)	−17.4 (0.7)	−6.7 (19.9)	−3.9 (25.0)	2.8 (37.0)	−0.6 (30.9)	−5.6 (21.9)	−10.6 (12.9)	−19.4 (−2.9)	−33.3 (−27.9)	−39.4 (−38.9)
Source: Environment Canada

== International border ==
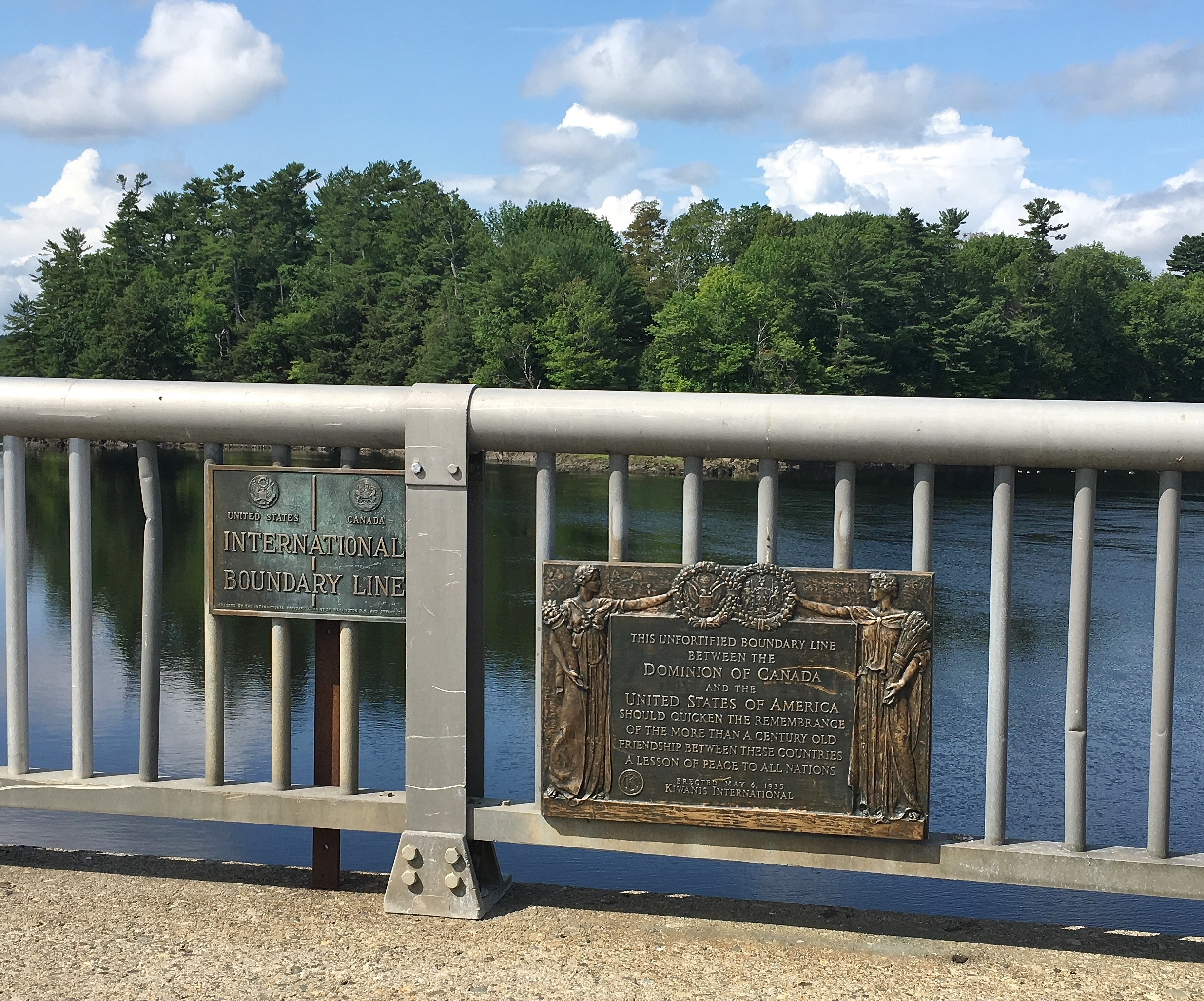
Sign at the international border between Calais, Maine, United States (left) and St. Stephen, New Brunswick, Canada (right)

The St. Croix River marks a section of the international boundary between the United States and Canada, forming a natural border between the towns on either side of the riverbank. This section of the river and the surrounding land were heavily contested by the French and the English during the 1600s, as both sides believed the riverine territory should belong to them. Later, the river was designated as part of the boundary between the United States and Canada, and many assumed the international line would follow the middle of the main channel. However, numerous smaller tributaries and islands remained unassigned and were not clearly allocated to either country.

In 1852, Robert Cooney wrote A Compendious History of the Northern and Eastern Parts of the Province of New Brunswick, where he noted that the churches in St. Stephen were complicit in the large amount of cross-border smuggling that took place.

The government dock—more akin to a small pier—is subject to a 6.7-metre (22 ft) tidal range, which limits marine trade to a minimal level. Calais is connected to St. Stephen by the Ferry Point International Bridge, Milltown International Bridge, and the newest crossing at the International Avenue Border Crossing, which began construction in 2008 and officially opened in January 2010.

Until passenger rail service was discontinued, it operated from the Canadian Pacific Railway station in St. Stephen. The station building now houses the 5 Kings Picaroons Brew Pub, and the former spur line has been decommissioned and converted into the Riverfront Walking Trail.

Woodland Rail operates a freight spur line between its pulp and paper plant in Baileyville, Maine, and St. Stephen, where the New Brunswick Southern Railway takes over and transports the freight to Saint John for wider distribution.

In the 1954 case Winner v. S.M.T. (Eastern) Limited, the American owner of an intercity bus company challenged a Canadian firm for the right to pick up and drop off passengers along the route from Saint John to Bangor, Maine. The Judicial Committee of the Privy Council ultimately upheld the American party's right. Acadian Lines bus service, which later operated in the region, was discontinued in 2011 due to low ridership.

Residents of St. Stephen and Calais often regard their communities as a single cross-border town, cooperating closely through shared fire services and other joint initiatives. For much of their history, both towns' fire departments have responded jointly to emergencies on either side of the border. This enduring friendship was evident during the War of 1812, when the British military supplied St. Stephen with gunpowder for defence against the Americans in Calais—only for the town's elders to donate it to Calais for its Fourth of July celebrations.

Each year, St. Stephen and Calais co-host a weeklong International Festival to celebrate their continued partnership.

== Economy ==
Ganong Bros. remains the town's most significant employer. Other manufacturing employers along Progress Avenue include a flakeboard and resin plant, a machine shop, a bottling facility, a marine environmental remediation business, and a cannabis products manufacturer. The town also hosts a wide variety of small businesses; a full listing appears in the local business directory.

St. Stephen has three media organizations: two radio stations and a newspaper. CHTD-FM, known as "98.1 Charlotte FM," plays adult contemporary music and provides regular news updates. CJRI-FM broadcasts from studios in Fredericton and operates a St. Stephen transmitter at 99.9 FM, offering a southern gospel music format along with Canadian news, weather, and sports. Founded in 1865, the Saint Croix Courier is the town's weekly newspaper and also publishes a weekend edition, Courier Weekend. It is one of the few newspapers in New Brunswick not owned by the Irving family.

The town has several elementary schools and two secondary schools, a public library, several churches, two museums, two community swimming pools, an enclosed hockey arena, multiple retirement homes, and a 44-bed hospital. Saint Andrews, located about 30 km away, served as the county seat until New Brunswick abolished its county government system in the 1960s, and it housed the regional courthouse and gaol until the courthouse was relocated to St. Stephen. In 2015, the provincial government proposed moving those judicial functions entirely to Saint John.

St. Stephen can be described as a government town, hosting major offices for federal services such as Canada Post and the Canada Border Services Agency, provincial services such as Service New Brunswick, and municipal departments including Solid Waste and Zoning.

== Education ==
Education in St. Stephen includes four public schools and one private school:

- Milltown Elementary School (K–5)
- St. Stephen Elementary School (K–5)
- St. Stephen Middle School (6–8)
- St. Stephen High School (9–12)

The town is also home to St. Stephen's University, a small private Christian university.

== Sports ==
Basketball was introduced to St. Stephen in 1891 by Lyman Archibald at the local Young Men's Christian Association and was later continued by J. Howard Crocker. In the early 1890s, Crocker organized annual track and field meets on Victoria Day at the local horse racing track.

St. Stephen, a hotbed of baseball interest, hosted the Boston Braves of baseball's National League in 1934 for an exhibition game against the local "Kiwanis" team—an event attended by half the town. In 1939, the local baseball team won its ninth consecutive New Brunswick senior championship, capping a decade of dominance at both the provincial and Maritime levels.

The St. Stephen Aces competed in the Maritime Junior A Hockey League but were sold and relocated to Fredericton, New Brunswick, in 2019.

A building that once housed the Parsons Printing business suffered fire damage in May 2010. That building contained Canada's first basketball court, which is currently being restored.

== Transportation ==
St. Stephen is served by Route 1 and Route 170, which run through town along King Street and Milltown Boulevard. U.S. Route 1 connects to the Ferry Point Bridge from Main Street in Calais, Maine.

== See also ==
- List of communities in New Brunswick
- St. Stephen Rural Cemetery
- List of people from Charlotte County
