= Charlotte County, New Brunswick =

County in New Brunswick, Canada

Charlotte County Comté de Charlotte
- County
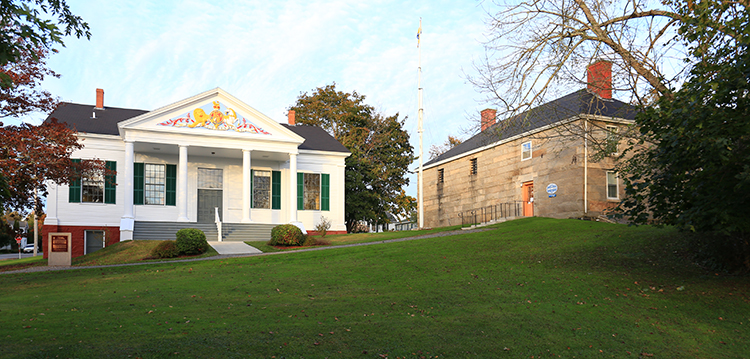
- County courthouse and jail

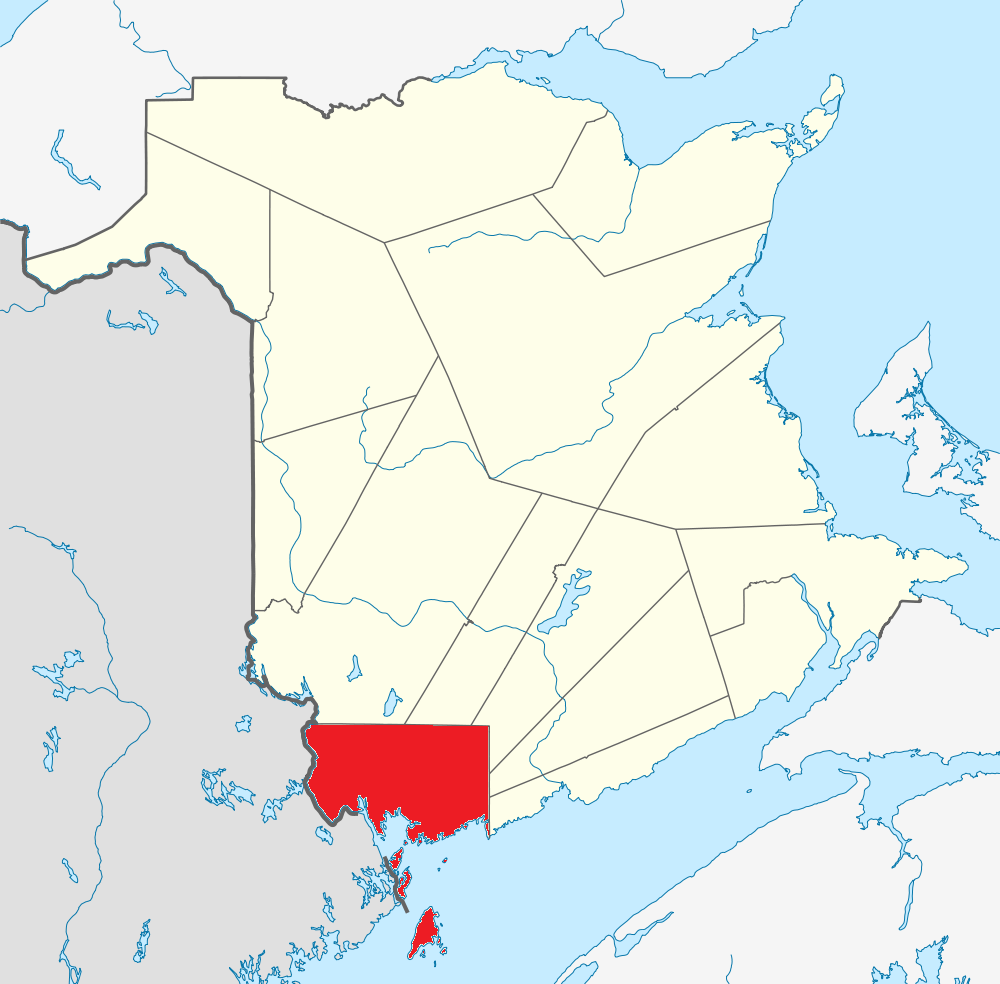
- Location within New Brunswick
- Coordinates: 45°10′N 66°50′W
- Country: Canada
- Province: New Brunswick
- Established: 1785
- Named for: Charlotte of Mecklenburg-Strelitz

Area
  - Land: 3,418.24 km^{2} (1,319.79 sq mi)

Population (2021)
  - Total: 26,015
  - Density: 7.6/km^{2} (20/sq mi)
  - Pop 2016-2021: ▲2.3%
  - Dwellings: 13,449
- Time zone: UTC−04:00 (AST)
  - Summer (DST): UTC−03:00 (ADT)
- Area code: 506

Charlotte County (2021 population 26,015) is the most southwestern county of New Brunswick, Canada.

It was formed in 1784 when New Brunswick was partitioned from Nova Scotia and named for Queen Charlotte. Once a layer of local government, the county government was abolished with the New Brunswick Equal Opportunity program in 1966. Counties continue to be used as census subdivisions by Statistics Canada.

Located in the southwestern corner of the province, bordering the U.S. state of Maine, Charlotte County is at the northern end of the Appalachian Mountains, which gives it a rugged terrain that includes Mount Pleasant. The St. Croix, Magaguadavic, and Digdegaush rivers drain into the Bay of Fundy. The county includes the large, populated islands of Grand Manan, White Head, Deer Island, and Campobello.

Eighteen per cent of the workforce is employed in aquaculture. Connors Bros., the largest sardine canning facility in North America, is located in Blacks Harbour. Cooke Aquaculture is an Atlantic salmon farming company, founded and headquartered in St. George. A paper mill, operated by J.D. Irving, Limited, is in Utopia, and Flakeboard Co. Ltd. operates outside St. Stephen. Ganong Bros., Canada's oldest chocolate company, maintains its factory in St. Stephen.

Governance is provided by New Brunswick municipalities for the towns of Saint Andrews, and St. Stephen, the village of Grand Manan, and the rural communities of Eastern Charlotte and Campobello Island. The remaining parts of the county are administered as part of Southwest Rural District, except Clarendon, which is part of Capital Region Rural District.

== History ==
Once the international border was delineated in Charlotte County and its islands, the area quickly became one of the foremost smuggling locales in the North Atlantic, compared to St. Marys, Georgia and the German Heligoland archipelago. In 1998, RCMP busted a smuggling operation by Seamus Skinner valued at forty million dollars.

During the War of 1812, the United States and British North America agreed to a ceasefire on the border between St. Stephen and Calais, as "a collision between those whose dwellings are within gunshot of each other would have produced the most unhappy consequences...and the authorities effectually restrained the violence that sometimes springs from rash and intemperate men."

Journalist John Edward Belliveau wrote that the county's residents "are distinctly oriented toward the American yankees who have always been their neighbours…detached from the rest of the province, they are independent and because they do not come in contact with the French-speaking areas they have not been concerned with French/English issues.".

== Demographics ==
Historical Census Data - Charlotte County, New Brunswick
Year	Pop.	±%
1991	26,607	—
1996	27,335	+2.7%
2001	27,366	+0.1%
2006	26,898	−1.7%
2011	26,549	−1.3%
2016	25,428	−4.2%
2021	26,015	+2.3%

As a census division in the 2021 Census of Population conducted by Statistics Canada, Charlotte County had a population of 26,015 living in 11,560 of its 13,449 total private dwellings, a change of 2.3% from its 2016 population of 25,428. With a land area of 3,418.24 km^{2} (1,319.79 sq mi), it had a population density of 7.6/km^{2} (19.7/sq mi) in 2021.

Canada census – Charlotte community profile

	2021	2016	2011
Population	26,015 (+2.3% from 2016)	25,428 (-4.2% from 2011)	26,549 (-1.3% from 2006)
Land area	3,418.24 km^{2} (1,319.79 sq mi)	3,426.97 km^{2} (1,323.16 sq mi)	3,424.33 km^{2} (1,322.14 sq mi)
Population density	7.6/km^{2} (20/sq mi)	7.4/km^{2} (19/sq mi)	7.8/km^{2} (20/sq mi)
Median age	49.6 (M: 48.8, F: 50.4)	47.9 (M: 47.0, F: 48.8)	45.1 (M: 44.0, F: 46.0)
Private dwellings	13,449 (total) 11,560 (occupied)	13,513 (total)	13,486 (total)
Median household income	$67,500	$55,701	$48,953

References: 2021 2016 2011

=== Population by census subdivision ===
Official name	Designation	Area: km^{2} (sq mi)	2016 population
St. Stephen	Town	13.52 (5.22)	4,415
Grand Manan	Village	152.77 (58.98)	2,360
Saint Andrews	Town	8.35 (3.22)	1,786
St. George	Town	16.17 (6.24)	1,517
Saint George	Parish		2,141
Pennfield	Parish		2,170
Saint Stephen	Parish		1,839
Saint David	Parish		1,529
Saint James	Parish		1,186
Fundy Bay	LSD	60.24	1,167
Dennis-Weston	LSD	43.94	1,023
Blacks Harbour	Village	9.06 (3.50)	894
Campobello Island	Rural community	39.67 (15.32)	872
West Isles	Parish		797
Lepreau	Parish		707
Saint Patrick	Parish		689
Saint Croix	Parish		657
Dufferin	Parish		573
Saint Andrews	Parish		553
Western Charlotte part B	LSD	28.97	534
Western Charlotte part A	LSD	162.3	435
Dumbarton	Parish		335
Beaver Harbour	LSD	2.25	277
Grand Manan	Parish		145
Clarendon	Parish		63

=== Language ===
Canada Census Mother Tongue - Charlotte County, New Brunswick
Census	Total	English			French			English & French			Non-official languages		
Year	Responses	Count	Trend	Pop %	Count	Trend	Pop %	Count	Trend	Pop %	Count	Trend	Pop %
2016	25,115	23,850	▼4.9%	94.96%	580	▼5.2%	2.31%	50	▼10.0%	0.21%	570	▲12.9%	2.27%
2011	26,185	25,015	▼2.4%	95.53%	610	▲7.0%	2.33%	55	▲120.0%	0.21%	505	▲26.3%	1.93%
2006	26,620	25,625	▼1.8%	96.26%	570	▼15.6%	2.14%	25	▼28.6%	0.10%	400	▲90.5%	1.50%
2001	27,020	26,100	▼0.2%	96.59%	675	▲23.9%	2.50%	35	▼22.2%	0.13%	210	▼16.0%	0.78%
1996	26,990	26,150	n/a	96.89%	545	n/a	2.02%	45	n/a	0.17%	250	n/a	0.93%

== Infrastructure ==
=== Power generation ===
Hydroelectric dams operate in St. George and St. Stephen at Milltown, though the latter is currently being decommissioned.

=== Major highways ===
- Route 1
- Route 3
- Route 127
- Route 170
- Route 172
- Route 175
- Route 176
- Route 630
- Route 725
- Route 730
- Route 735
- Route 740
- Route 745
- Route 750
- Route 755
- Route 760
- Route 770
- Route 772
- Route 774
- Route 776
- Route 778
- Route 780
- Route 785

== See also ==
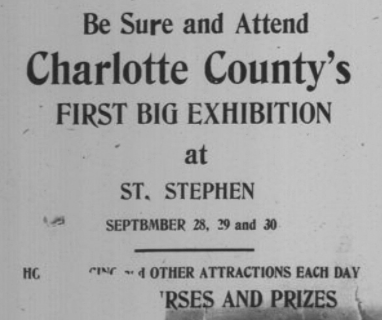
1909 advertisement for the first Charlotte County Fair

- Charlotte County Militia
- List of communities in New Brunswick
- List of historic places in Charlotte County, New Brunswick
- List of people from Charlotte County, New Brunswick
- Disputed areas with the United States: Machias Seal Island, North Rock
- List of parishes in New Brunswick
- Royal eponyms in Canada
