= Briggs =

Briggs may refer to:

== People and fictional characters ==
- Briggs (surname), including a list of people and fictional characters
- Briggs (given name), a list of people
- Briggs (rapper) (born 1986), Australian rapper
- Bishop Briggs, stage name of British-American singer and songwriter Sarah Grace McLaughlin (born 1992)

== Places ==
In the United States

- Briggs, Nebraska, an unincorporated community
- Briggs, Ohio, an extinct town
- Briggs, Oklahoma, an unincorporated community and census-designated place
- Briggs, Texas, an unincorporated community
- Briggs, Virginia, an unincorporated community
- Briggs Reservoir (Manomet, Massachusetts)
- Briggs Reservoir (Plymouth, Massachusetts)
- Briggs Lake, a lake in Minnesota
- Briggs Run, a tributary of the Mohawk River near Yosts, New York

Elsewhere

- Briggs Hill, Victoria Land, Antarctica
- Briggs Peninsula, Graham Land, Antarctica
- Briggs Islet, Tasmania, Australia
- Briggs Township, Ontario, Canada
- Briggs Inlet, British Columbia, Canada
- Briggs Glacier, South Georgia Island
- Briggs Point, South Georgia Island
- Briggs (crater), a lunar crater
- 4209 Briggs, an asteroid

== Businesses ==
- Briggs Automotive Company, a car manufacturing company
- Briggs Manufacturing Company, manufacturer of car bodies for Ford and Chrysler
- Briggs & Little, a manufacturer of wool knitting yarns
- Briggs & Stratton, a manufacturer of air-cooled gasoline engines

== Schools ==
- Richard C. Briggs High School, Norwalk, Connecticut, United States
- Briggs High School (Ohio), United States

== Sports ==
- Briggs Stadium, a former name of Tiger Stadium, a former baseball ballpark in Detroit
- Briggs Stadium (Missouri State), a former name of Robert W. Plaster Stadium, a football stadium in Springfield, Missouri
- Briggs Motor Sport, a former Australian motor racing team

== Other uses ==
- The Briggs, a punk rock band
- Briggs baronets, two extinct titles, one in the Baronetage of England and one in the Baronetage of the United Kingdom
- Briggs Formation, a geologic formation in Texas, United States
- Briggs Sanitorium, a former hospital in Oak Cliff, Texas
- Briggs v. Elliott, one of the school segregation cases consolidated with Brown v. Board of Education
- Briggs Initiative, either of two pieces of Californian legislation sponsored by John Briggs

== See also ==
- Briggs House (disambiguation)
- Richard Briggs Farm, East Greenwich, Rhode Island, United States, on the National Register of Historic Places
- Briggs Report, a 1972 report of the Committee on Nursing in the United Kingdom
- Brigg (disambiguation)
