= Dumbarton Parish =

Coordinates: 45.394954°N 67.073765°W

Dumbarton
- Parish
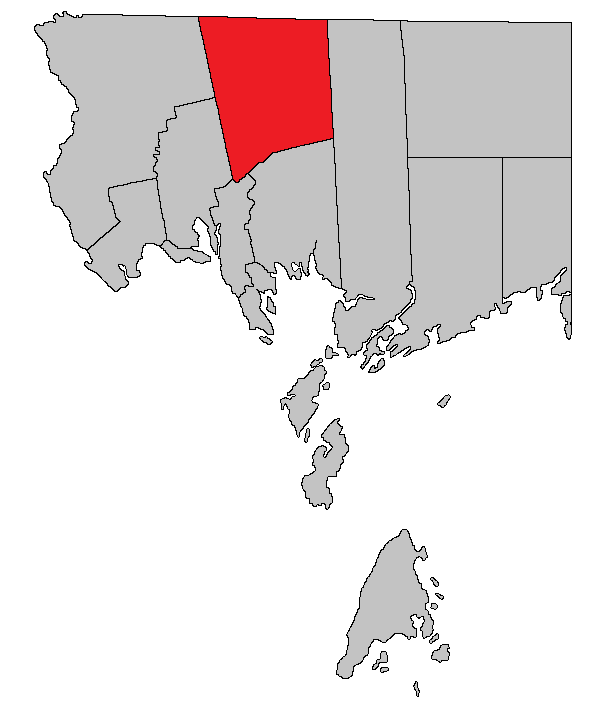
- Location within Charlotte County.
- Country: Canada
- Province: New Brunswick
- County: Charlotte County
- Erected: 1856

Area
  - Land: 373.20 km^{2} (144.09 sq mi)

Population (2021)
  - Total: 346
  - Density: 0.9/km^{2} (2.3/sq mi)
  - Change 2016-2021: ▲3.3%
  - Dwellings: 182
- Time zone: UTC-4 (AST)
  - Summer (DST): UTC-3 (ADT)

Dumbarton is a geographic parish in Charlotte County, New Brunswick, Canada, (Note: The Territorial Division Act divides the province into 152 parishes, the cities of Saint John and Fredericton, and one town of Grand Falls. The Interpretation Act clarifies that parishes include any local government within their borders.) located inland north of St. George and south of Harvey.

For governance purposes, the entire parish is part of the Southwest rural district, which is a member of the Southwest New Brunswick Service Commission.

Prior to the 2023 governance reform, it comprised a single local service district (LSD), which was a member of the Southwest New Brunswick Service Commission (SNBSC).

The Census subdivision of the same name shares the parish's boundaries.

== Origin of name ==
The parish may have been named for the town of Dumbarton, Scotland, although William Francis Ganong considered this uncertain.

== History ==
Dumbarton was erected from northern Saint Patrick Parish in 1856.

It included a small triangle of Saint Croix Parish southwest of the junction of Wilson Road and Route 127 until 1958.

== Boundaries ==
Dumbarton Parish is bounded:

- on the north by the York County line;
- on the east by the prolongation of the eastern line of a shoreline grant to John McDougall west of Sherard Beach;
- on the south by the southern line of a grant beginning at the mouth of Milligan Brook on the Magaguadavic River, then running westerly along the grant line and its prolongation to the rear line of grants along the Digdeguash River, then southwesterly along the southeastern line of a grant to John Campbell the crosses Route 770 until it strikes the Digdeguash, then upstream about 300 metres to the southeastern line of a grant to John Gillman, then southwesterly along the Gillman grant, crossing Wilson Road, to the rear line of grants along Cathcart Road, then northwesterly about 150 metres, then southwesterly along the southeastern line of a grant to John McFarlane to a point near Route 127;
- on the west by a line beginning near Route 127, then running northwesterly along the southwestern line of grants to John McFarlane and John McKenney to a point about 150 metres south of the old railway, on the eastern line of the Cape Ann Association grant, the easternmost grants of which front on the eastern side of Board Road, then northerly along the Cape Ann grant and its prolongation to the York County line.

== Local service district ==
The local service district of the parish of Dumbarton comprised the entire parish.

The LSD was established in 1969 to assess for community services, in this case to provide ambulance service after local funeral homes ceased doing so. Fire protection was added in 1970.

In 2021, the LSD assessed for only the basic LSD services of fire protection, police services, land use planning, emergency measures, and dog control. The taxing authority is 510.00 Dumbarton.

== Communities ==
Communities at least partly within the parish.

- Berrys Falls
- Clarence Ridge
- Dumbarton
- Flume Ridge
- Greenock
- Hewitt
- Pleasant Ridge
- Rollingdam
- Sorrel Ridge
- Tryon Settlement
- Whittier Ridge

== Bodies of water ==
Bodies of water (Note: Not including brooks, ponds or coves.) at least partly within the parish.

- Digdeguash River
- Magaguadavic River
- Clarence Stream
- Kedron Stream
- Big Kedron Lake
- Craig Lake

== Islands ==
Parks, historic sites, and other noteworthy places at least partly within the parish.

- Flume Islands

== Demographics ==
=== Population ===
Canada census – Dumbarton community profile

	2021	2016	2011
Population	346 (+3.3% from 2016)	335 (-9.0% from 2011)	368 (+3.4% from 2006)
Land area	373.20 km^{2} (144.09 sq mi)	374.43 km^{2} (144.57 sq mi)	375.08 km^{2} (144.82 sq mi)
Population density	0.9/km^{2} (2.3/sq mi)	0.9/km^{2} (2.3/sq mi)	1.0/km^{2} (2.6/sq mi)
Median age	50.4 (M: 50.0, F: 52.0)	51.3 (M: 49.0, F: 52.1)	48.4 (M: 47.8, F: 48.6)
Private dwellings	182 (total) 158 (occupied)	195 (total)	204 (total)
Median household income	$60,800	$46,784	$.N/A

Notes: 2011 income data for this area has been suppressed for data quality or confidentiality reasons.
References: 2021 2016 2011

Historical Census Data - Dumbarton Parish, New Brunswick

Year	Pop.	±%
1991	426	—
1996	447	+4.9%

Year	Pop.	±%
2001	430	−3.8%
2006	356	−17.2%

Year	Pop.	±%
2011	368	+3.4%
2016	335	−9.0%

=== Language ===
Canada Census Mother Tongue - Dumbarton Parish, New Brunswick
Census	Total	English			French			English & French			Other		
Year	Responses	Count	Trend	Pop %	Count	Trend	Pop %	Count	Trend	Pop %	Count	Trend	Pop %
2011	375	360	▲4.2%	96.00%	15	▲ n/a%	4.00%	0	0.0%	0.00%	0	▼100.0%	0.00%
2006	355	345	▼19.8%	97.18%	0	0.0%	0.00%	0	0.0%	0.00%	10	▲ n/a%	2.82%
2001	430	430	▼3.4%	100.00%	0	0.0%	0.00%	0	0.0%	0.00%	0	0.0%	0.00%
1996	445	445	n/a	100.00%	0	n/a	0.00%	0	n/a	0.00%	0	n/a	0.00%

== Access Routes ==
Highways and numbered routes that run through the parish, including external routes that start or finish at the parish limits:

- Highways
  - Route 3
- Principal Routes
  - Route 127
- Secondary Routes:
  - Route 770
- External Routes:
  - None

== See also ==
- List of parishes in New Brunswick
