= Briggs House =

Briggs House may refer to:

- Alexander Briggs House, Charleston, Illinois
- Henshie-Briggs Row House, Des Moines, Iowa
- Long-Briggs House, Russellville, Kentucky, listed on the National Register of Historic Places
- Samuel and Mary Logan Briggs House, Stanford, Kentucky
- William Briggs Homestead, Auburn, Maine
- George I. Briggs House, Bourne, Massachusetts
- William S. Briggs Homestead, a contributing building to the Alcove Historic District, Alcove, New York
- Bruce-Briggs Brick Block, Lancaster, New York
- John Briggs House, Milo Center, New York
- Joseph Briggs House, Coventry, Rhode Island
