= Manners Sutton Parish, New Brunswick =

Manners Sutton
- Parish
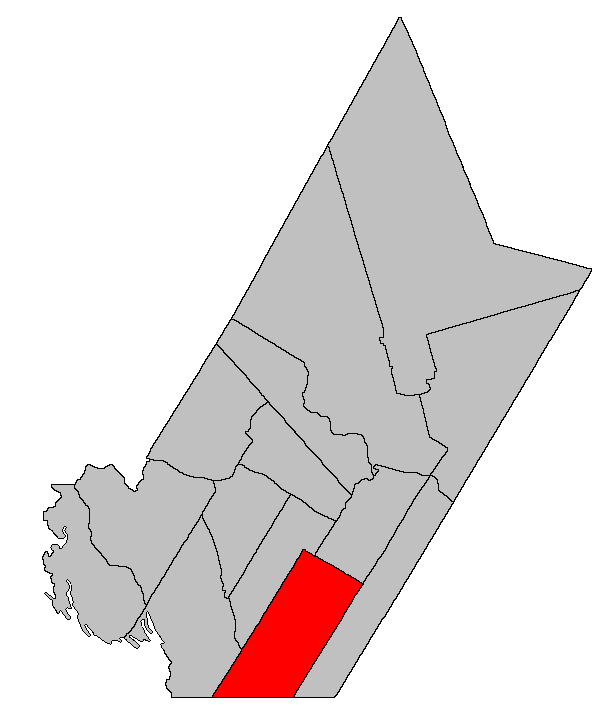
- Location within York County, New Brunswick.
- Coordinates: 45.69°N 67.04°W
- Country: Canada
- Province: New Brunswick
- County: York
- Erected: 1855

Area
  - Land: 524.75 km^{2} (202.61 sq mi)

Population (2021)
  - Total: 1,920
  - Density: 3.7/km^{2} (9.6/sq mi)
  - Change 2016-2021: ▲8.0%
  - Dwellings: 1,067
- Time zone: UTC-4 (AST)
  - Summer (DST): UTC-3 (ADT)
- Figures do not include portion within the village of Harvey

Manners Sutton is a geographic parish in York County, New Brunswick, Canada.

Prior to the 2023 governance reform, for governance purposes it was divided between the village of Harvey and the local service district of the parish of Manners Sutton, both of which were members of the Southwest New Brunswick Service Commission (SNBSC).

== Origin of name ==
The parish was named in honour of John Manners-Sutton, 3rd Viscount Canterbury, Lieutenant Governor of New Brunswick at the time. Canterbury Parish was erected at the same time.

== History ==
Manners Sutton was erected in 1855 from Kingsclear and Prince William Parishes.

== Boundaries ==
Manners Sutton Parish is bounded:

- on the northeast by a line beginning on the eastern shore of Lake George and running south 45º east (Note: By the magnet of 1896, when declination in the area was between 19º and 20º west of north. The Territorial Division Act clause referring to magnetic direction bearings was omitted in the 1952 and 1973 Revised Statutes.) along the northeastern line a grant to John Hood on the western side of Route 640 and along the southwestern boundary of Hanwell until it strikes the northwestern line of New Maryland Parish, about 5.2 kilometres past Route 640;
- on the southeast by the northwestern line of New Maryland Parish, which parallels the Sunbury County line;
- on the south by the Charlotte County line;
- on the northwest by a line beginning about 3.8 kilometres east of Route 3 on the Charlotte County line, then running northeasterly parallel to the Sunbury County line to the starting point on Lake George.

== Communities ==
Communities at least partly within the parish. bold indicates an incorporated municipality; italics indicate a name no longer in official use

- Acton
- Brockway
- Christie Ridge
- Coburn
- Cork
- Frog Lake
- **Harvey** (PO Harvey Station)
- Harvey Settlement
- Hurley Corner
- Manners Sutton
- Prince William Station
- Roach
- South Tweedside
- Swans Shore
- Thomaston Corner
- Tweedside
- Upper Brockway
- Upper Mills
- Wilmot
- York Mills

== Bodies of water ==
Bodies of water (Note: Not including brooks, ponds or coves.) at least partly within the parish.

- Magaguadavic River
- Harvey Lake Thoroughfare
- Lyons Stream
- Yoho Stream
- Gardner Creek
- Jewetts Creek
- Frog Lake
- Lake George
- Grieve Lake
- Holland Lake
- Mud Lake
- Oromocto Lake
- Stephenson Lake

== Islands ==
Islands at least partly within the parish.

- Birch Island
- Cedar Islands
- Jackknife Islands
- Kelly Island
- Pine Island
- Ship Island
- Spruce Island

== Other notable places ==
Parks, historic sites, and other noteworthy places at least partly within the parish.

- Briggs & Little
- Brockway Airport

== Demographics ==
Parish population total does not include Harvey

=== Population ===
**Population trend**

Census	Population	Change (%)
2021	1,920	▲8.0%
2016	1,777	▼1.6%
2011	1,806	▼3.1%
2006	1,863	▼1.0%
2001	1,882	▲2.8%
1996	1,830	▲5.1%
1991	1,741	N/A

=== Language ===
**Mother tongue (2016)**

Language	Population	Pct (%)
English only	1,715	96.3%
French only	45	2.5%
Other languages	20	1.1%
Both English and French	0	0%

== See also ==
- List of parishes in New Brunswick
