= Brig (disambiguation) =

A brig is a type of sailing ship.

Brig may also refer to:

== In the military ==
- Brig, a (chiefly American) term for a naval military prison on a ship or navy base
- An abbreviation for the rank of brigadier
- An abbreviation for a brigade

== Places ==
- Brig District, canton of Valais, Switzerland
  - Brig-Glis (also known simply as "Brig"), a town in the district
    - Brig railway station, serving Brig, Switzerland
    - Brig Bahnhofplatz railway station, the station in Brig used by metre-gauge trains
- Bamber Bridge, a town in Lancashire, England, often referred to as "Brig" by residents
- Brig, Istria County, Croatia, a village
- Brig Rock, New Zealand, an island

== Arts and entertainment ==
- The Brig (play), a 1963 play by Kenneth H. Brown
- "The Brig" (Lost), an episode of the TV series Lost
- The Brig, a nickname of the Doctor Who character Brigadier Lethbridge-Stewart

== People ==
- Brigman Brig Owens (born 1943), American former National Football League player
- Brig Van Osten, American hairstylist who won the reality TV series Shear Genius (season 3)

== Other uses ==
- Brig, another name for the Celtic goddess Brigid
- An obsolete abbreviation for a brigantine, a type of sailing ship

== See also ==
- Brigg (disambiguation)
- Briggs (disambiguation)
