= Norwalk Public Schools =

School district in Connecticut, United States

Location
- Southwestern Connecticut; Fairfield County United States

District information
- Type: School district
- Grades: K-12
- Established: 1678; 348 years ago
- Superintendent: Dr. Alexandra Estrella
- Budget: $133 million (2005-06)

Students and staff
- Students: 11,000
- Athletic conference: FCIAC

Other information
- Website: www.norwalkps.org

Norwalk Public Schools is the school district serving Norwalk, Connecticut.

== History ==
Norwalk was granted a town charter by the Connecticut General Court in 1651. On May 29, 1678, town records mention the establishment of community-supported teaching activities with a passage that reads:

"At a town meeting... voted and agreed to hier a scole master to teach all the children in ye town to lerne to Rede and write; and that Mr. Cornish shall be hierd for that service and the townsmen are to hier him upon as reasonable terms as they can."

The school that was established in the 1670s was located near the Ludlow Square area of East Norwalk (near the former Roger Ludlow Junior High School).

In the 2005-06 fiscal year, the school system spent $26.7 million on special education services, nearly 20 percent of the total school budget.

The State Education Department announced on January 28, 2008 that Norwalk was one of twelve districts in the state that it would help to close student achievement gaps.

== High schools ==
There are four high schools in the Norwalk public school district, for grades 9-12:

- Norwalk High School is the home of the Norwalk Bears. The school was founded in 1902 with a top three football team in the state.
- Brien McMahon High School, named for Senator Brien McMahon, first chairman of the Joint Committee on Atomic Energy, was founded in 1960. Brien McMahon High School is also home to the Center for Global Studies with the worst football team in the state .
- P-TECH Norwalk
- Center for Global Studies
- Briggs High School is an alternative school.

In 2006 the state of Connecticut reported that Norwalk's 653 graduates represented a 95.7% graduation rate.

== Middle schools ==
There are four middle schools in the Norwalk public school district, for grades 6-8:

- Nathan Hale Middle School
- Ponus Ridge Middle School
- Roton Middle School
- West Rocks Middle School

=== Ponus Ridge Middle School ===
In the 2005-06 school year 42.3 percent of the school's 640 students qualified for free or reduced-price lunches. A total of 40.3 percent of students come from homes where the primary language is not English. The primary language for many students is Spanish, but students also come from homes where Chinese or Haitian Creole are spoken. The school building was constructed in the late 1950s. On May 14, 2007, several state legislators toured the school in an attempt by Fairfield County lawmakers to educate them about the need for more state education funding in the richest county in the state.

=== Roton Middle School ===
In the 2002-03 school year 27.5 percent of the school's 517 students qualified for free or reduced-price lunches. A total of 34.2 percent of students come from homes where the primary language is not English. The school building was constructed in 1966. And in 2020-2021 all meals are free to students.

== Elementary schools ==
There are twelve elementary schools in the Norwalk public school district, for grades K-5:

- Brookside
- Columbus (magnet school)
- Cranbury
- Fox Run
- Jefferson (magnet school)
- Kendall
- Marvin
- Naramake
- Rowayton
- Silvermine
- Tracey (magnet school)
- Wolfpit

== Radon levels in 2007-2008 ==
State-mandated radon tests in early 2007 found rooms in five elementary schools with levels above the "federal action limit" of 4 picocuries per liter for the colorless, odorless gas. (The gas naturally occurs in Fairfield County and comes up from the ground from the decay of radium. It is the second leading cause of lung cancer, after smoking.) The 700 tests, conducted every five years by state law, found actionable levels of radon in Rowayton, Naramake, Cranbury and Wolfpit elementary schools as well as Richard C. Briggs High School. Mitigation work, including air-suction devices, was done on just over a dozen rooms at the various schools, then a follow-up test was done which found one Wolfpit classroom located farthest away from the air-suction devices still had 5.1 picocuries per liter, so an additional device was installed in early March 2008.

=== No Child Left Behind Act in Norwalk ===
In 2006, all high schools, three of the city's middle schools and nine of its elementary schools, along with a "community school" were cited as falling behind in standards for the federal "No Child Left Behind" Act. Three elementary schools had not met the standards (which rise year by year) for two years in a row, so students in those schools are offered the choice to go to a Norwalk public school that hasn't been designated as needing improvement. "Whole school" problems are school-wide, "subgroup" problems reflect groups such as white, black, Hispanic, Asian and American-Indian children; English language learners; students with disabilities; and economically disadvantaged students.

- Norwalk High School — In the 2006 NCLB report, the school was cited as having "subgroup deficiencies in math."
- Brien McMahon High School — In the 2006 NCLB report, the school was cited as having "subgroup deficiencies in math and reading."
- Briggs High School — In the 2006 NCLB report, the school was cited as having "whole school deficiencies in math and reading."
- West Rocks Middle School — In the 2006 NCLB report, the school was cited as having "subgroup deficiencies in math and reading."
- Roton Middle School — In the 2006 NCLB report, the school was cited as having "whole school deficiencies in math."
- Ponus Ridge Middle School — In the 2006 NCLB report, the school was cited as having "whole school deficiencies in math."
- Brookside — For 2006, the school did not meet NCLB criteria two years in a row, so students (within certain parameters) will be offered the choice of going to another school. In the report the school was cited as having "subgroup deficiencies in math and reading."
- Columbus — In the 2006 NCLB report, the school was cited as having "subgroup deficiencies in math and reading."
- Cranbury — In the 2006 NCLB report, the school was cited as having "subgroup deficiencies in math and reading."
- Fox Run — In the 2006 NCLB report, the school was cited as having "subgroup deficiencies in math and reading."
- Jefferson — In the 2006 NCLB report, the school was cited as having "whole school deficiencies in reading."
- Kendall — For 2006, the school did not meet NCLB criteria two years in a row, so students (within certain parameters) will be offered the choice of going to another school. In the report the school was cited as having "subgroup deficiencies in math and reading."
- Marvin — In the 2006 NCLB report, the school was cited as having "whole school deficiencies in math and reading."
- Naramake — In the 2006 NCLB report, the school was cited as having "subgroup deficiencies in reading."
- Silvermine — For 2006, the school did not meet NCLB criteria two years in a row, so students (within certain parameters) will be offered the choice of going to another school. In the report the school was cited as having "whole school deficiencies in math and reading."
- Side by Side Community charter school (not Norwalk public) — In the 2006 NCLB report, the school was cited as having "subgroup deficiencies in math."

== District Reference Group H ==
Norwalk is one of eight public school systems in District Reference Group H, a classification made by the state Department of Education for the purpose of comparison with the achievement levels of similar schools and districts. District reference groups are defined as "districts whose students' families are similar in education, income, occupation and need, and that have roughly similar enrollment." The other seven school districts in the group are Ansonia, Danbury, Derby, East Hartford, Meriden, Norwich, Stamford, and West Haven.
