= Education in Norwalk, Connecticut =

There are an assortment of public, private, and parochial schools in Norwalk, Connecticut.

== Post-secondary education ==
There are four post-secondary schools within the city of Norwalk:

- Norwalk Community College is in West Norwalk
- Gibbs College, Norwalk campus (Closed)
- University of Phoenix Fairfield County campus is at 535 Connecticut Avenue Suite 400.
- Post University opened a "regional center" in Norwalk in the Fall of 2008.

There are also other post-secondary schools in nearby towns.

The Norwalk Hospital runs an internship program associated with the Yale School of Medicine and a nursing program associated with Norwalk Community College.

== Norwalk Public Schools ==
Norwalk Public Schools is the school district serving Norwalk, Connecticut.

It operates the following high schools:

- Norwalk High School is the home of the Norwalk Bears. The school was founded in 1902.
- Brien McMahon High School, named for Senator Brien McMahon, first chairman of the Joint Committee on Atomic Energy, was founded in 1960. Brien McMahon High School is also home to the Center for Global Studies.
- Briggs High School is an alternative school.

== Charter school ==
The Side by Side Community School is a charter school that is located in South Norwalk and serves grades pre-K through 8th. It was started in 1997, soon after Connecticut's charter school law went into effect, by a group of public educators. This regional school serves students from Norwalk as well as from surrounding towns.

== Parochial ==
The All Saints Catholic School, serves grades pre-K through 8th. It is operated by the Roman Catholic Diocese of Bridgeport which consolidated three previous Norwalk elementary schools (St. Thomas, St. Philips, and St. Mary's) and closed the former Central Catholic High School to open the All Saints in the former Central Catholic High building on West Rocks Road.

The Congregation Beth El on East Avenue runs the Nitzan preschool as well as the Navasky Hebrew school for part-time religious instruction of children who are enrolled full-time in other elementary schools.

Connecticut Friends School, established as a K–8 school in 1998, purchased the White Barn Theatre in the Cranbury neighborhood in northeast Norwalk in 2008. The Quaker school planned to build a new solar-powered 24,000 square feet (2,200 m^{2}) campus on the property with occupancy expected by the fall of 2009 for grades K-8. The expansion plans were abandoned in 2015, when "the Board of Directors was forced by declining enrollment to limit the size of the school to the preschool, ages 2-5".

== Private ==
Since September 2004 the Montessori Middle School for grades 5-8 has been in Norwalk and is currently at 24 Lois Street (off of Westport Avenue). It is associated with The Montessori School for elementary grades in nearby Wilton.

Since September 2007 the Winston Preparatory School of New York City has operated a branch campus along West Rocks Road in Norwalk. The school specializes in students with learning differences in grades 4 through 12.

== See also ==
- List of school districts in Connecticut

== Notes ==
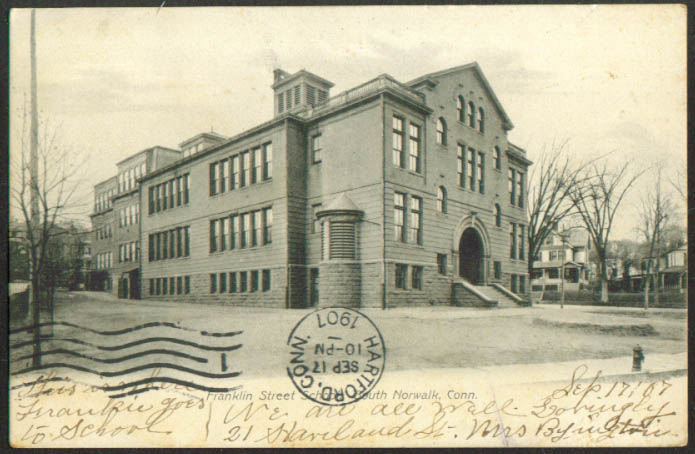
Former Franklin Street School, about 1907
