= Briggs High School =

Briggs High School may refer to:

- Richard C. Briggs High School - Norwalk, Connecticut
- Briggs High School (Columbus, Ohio) - Columbus, Ohio
