= KHLW =

- Tabor, Iowa; United States
- Broadcast area: Nebraska City, Nebraska; Shenandoah, Iowa; Auburn, Nebraska
- Frequency: 89.3 MHz
- Branding: Living Water Radio

Programming
- Format: Christian radio

Ownership
- Owner: Calvary Chapel of Omaha

Technical information
- Licensing authority: FCC
- Facility ID: 174613
- Class: C2
- ERP: 50,000 watts
- HAAT: 116 meters (381 ft)
- Transmitter coordinates: 40°34′33″N 95°34′24″W
- Translator: 98.9 K255CJ (Briggs, Nebraska)

Links
- Public license information: Public file; LMS
- Website: livingwaterradio.org

KHLW (89.3 FM) is a radio station licensed to Tabor, Iowa, United States. The station airs a format consisting of Christian talk and teaching and Christian music, and is currently owned by Calvary Chapel of Omaha. The station serves southwestern Iowa, northwestern Missouri, and eastern Nebraska.
