= Harvey Elementary School =

There are a number of Elementary schools named Harvey Elementary School:

- Harvey Elementary School (Santa Ana, California)
- Harvey Elementary School (Ronan, Montana)
- Harvey Elementary School - (Harvey Station, New Brunswick)
- Harvey Elementary School (Kenosha, Wisconsin)
