= Richard C. Briggs High School =

High school in Connecticut, United States

Coordinates: 41.138065°N 73.425863°W

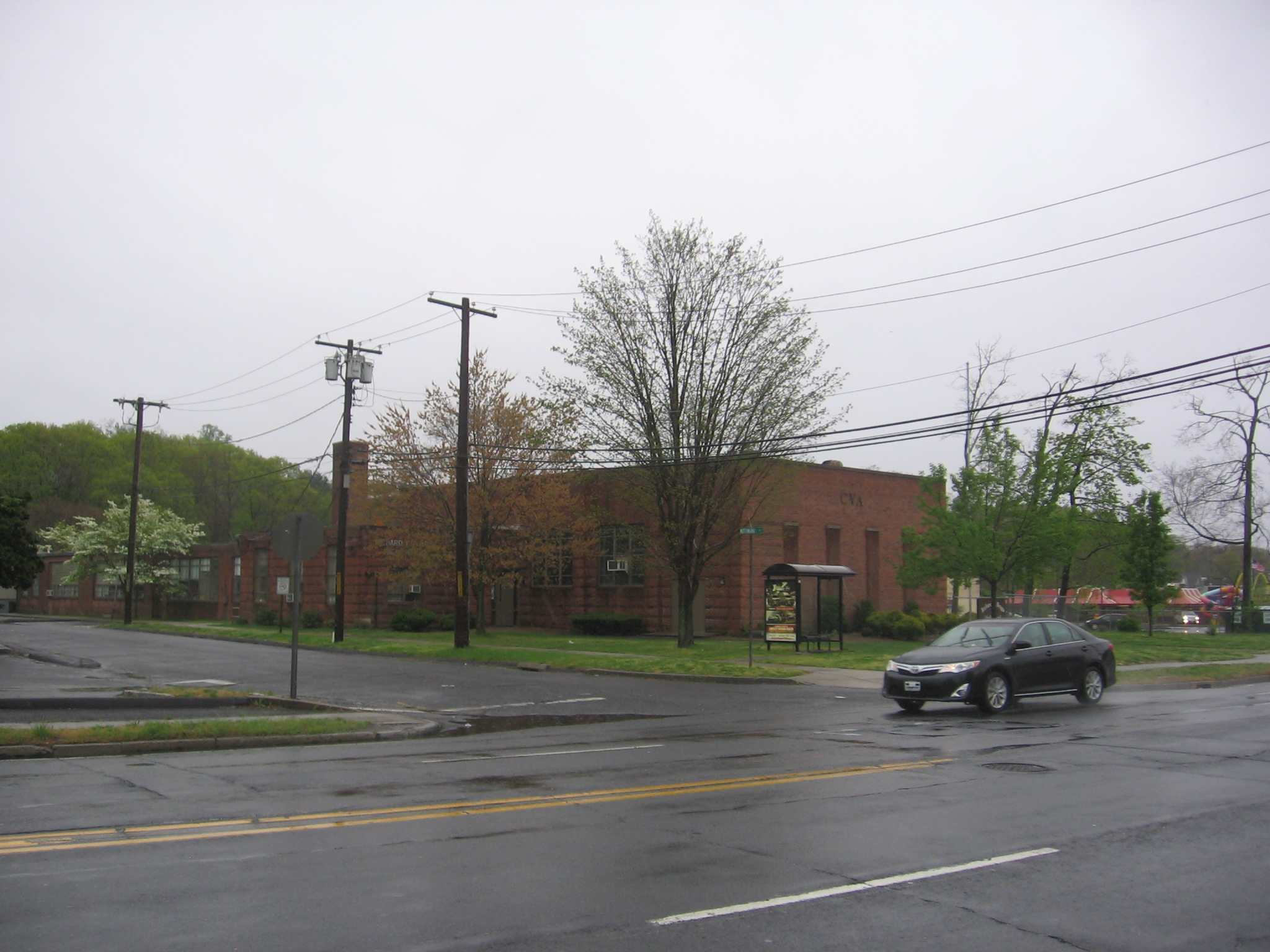
- School building bearing CVA initials, 22 April 2012
- 350 Main Avenue; Norwalk, CT 06851

Information
- Type: Public
- Opened: 1938
- Closed: 2018
- Information: (203) 899-2820
- Website: http://briggs.npsteachers.org/

Richard C. Briggs High School was a secondary school located in Norwalk, Connecticut, USA. It opened in 1938 as a replacement for the Winnipauk School. Later it was turned into the secondary level Center for Vocational Arts but is now named after Dr. Richard C. Briggs, who was the superintendent of Norwalk schools from 1971 to 1980. Briggs High then became an alternative to the two traditional high schools (Norwalk High and Brien McMahon). Its last principal was Marie Allen.

Briggs students have the opportunity to enroll in the Briggs-Norwalk Community College Academy, in which they can take college classes at Norwalk Community College while they are still in high school. There is also an active photography program within the school.

The class of 2007 included 22 graduates.

In January 2007, Briggs was listed by the ConnCAN educational research consultancy as number 7 in their list of Connecticut schools making significant progress in shrinking the gap between white and minority students on standardized test scores, and it was the only high school in the top 10 on the list.

In August 2008, the school underwent some external refurbishments that included a new sign and trees planted in front of the building. Materials and labor were provided by volunteers from a nearby office of the General Electric corporation.

In 2018, the school was renamed to Norwalk Pathways Academy and then closed that same year.

== See also ==
- Education in Norwalk, Connecticut
