= Brockway, New Brunswick =

Community in New Brunswick, Canada

Coordinates: 45.530°N 67.114°W

Location of Brockway in New Brunswick

Brockway is a community in York County, New Brunswick. It was founded in 1818 by Reuben and Anne Brockway on the banks of the Magaguadavic River. Today, Brockway is known for its blueberry fields and fishing and paddling on the river. In 2021, it was part of the Manners Sutton Parish CSD, which had a population of 1,920.

== See also ==
- List of communities in New Brunswick
