= Briggs & Little =

New Brunswick yarn manufacturer

Coordinates: 45.729786°N 67.006604°W

Briggs & Little Woolen Mills Ltd.
- Company type: Private
- Industry: Yarn
- Founded: 1916
- Founders: Matthew Briggs; Howard Little
- Headquarters: York Mills, New Brunswick, Canada
- Products: Wool and wool blend yarns
- Website: www.briggsandlittle.com

Briggs & Little Woolen Mills Ltd. is a manufacturer of wool knitting yarns in York Mills, near Harvey Station, New Brunswick, Canada. A woollen mill has existed on the site since 1857, operating under the current name since 1916.

== History ==
The original mill was built in 1857 by George Lister, who also operated a gristmill and a sawmill in an area near Harvey Station, New Brunswick that came to be known as York Mills. The mills were powered by dams on the Magaguadavic River. During the succeeding decades the woollen mill changed ownership several times, and the original structure burned in 1908. The mill was rebuilt and was operated by members of the Little family as Little's Woollen Mill until 1916 when it was renamed Briggs & Little after its new owners Matthew Briggs and Howard Little. Subsequently, Howard Little's son, grandson, and great-grandson have all been involved in running the mill. In 1948 Matthew Briggs's interest in the mill was bought by another member of the Little family, Ward Little, whose grandson John Thompson succeeded him as part owner in 1978. As the company operating a mill which has been in existence since 1857, Briggs & Little styles itself "Canada's Oldest Woolen Mill".

The mill has been lost to fire and rebuilt four times: in 1908, 1944, 1956, and 1994. A fire on 1 November 1994 destroyed the mill building and equipment, but the separate office and inventory storage buildings were saved. It reopened over two years later in the same location. The rebuilt mill no longer uses water to power any of its machinery, although water from the Magaguadavic River is still used for washing wool.

== Products ==
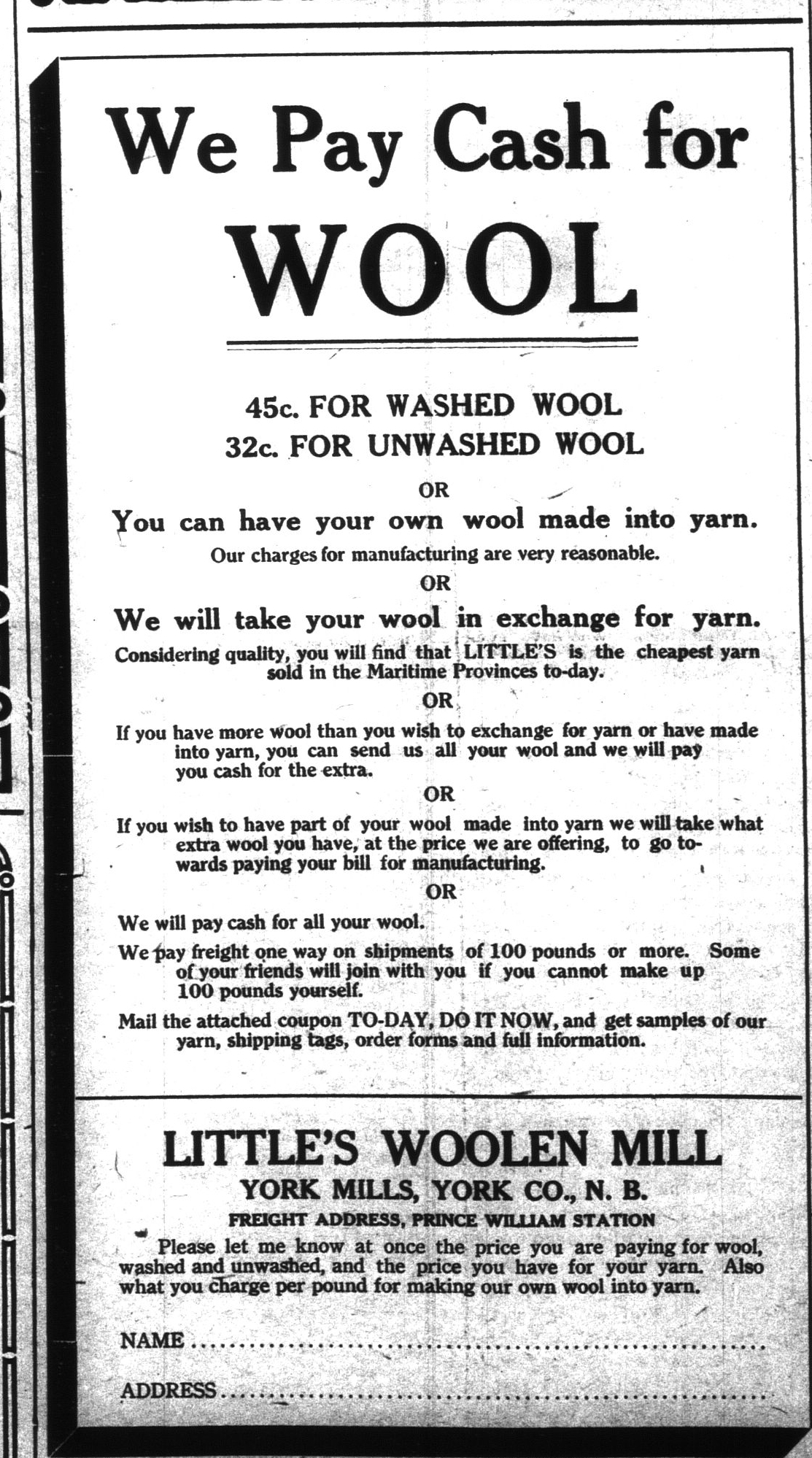
1915 advertisement for Little's Wool & Yarn

Briggs & Little produces wool knitting yarn in several weights, as well as a blend of 80% wool and 20% nylon in two weights. It also sells carded raw fleece used for stuffing or hand spinning. The mill is described as a "fully integrated vertical mill" in which raw fleece is transformed into the finished yarn product by a series of operations including "scouring, dyeing, blending, carding, spinning, reeling, packaging and labeling". The raw wool is purchased from Canadian producers.

Until 1944 Briggs & Little yarn was available only in black, white, and four shades of grey. Black yarn was produced with a dye made from logwood chips. In 1944 the company introduced three additional colours: paddy green, royal blue and scarlet red. As of 2014 Briggs & Little was producing yarn in 45 shades.

The enterprise includes a yarn shop on the premises at which yarn and patterns are available for purchase.
