= West Norwalk =

Coordinates: 41.11°N 73.463°W

- Neighborhood
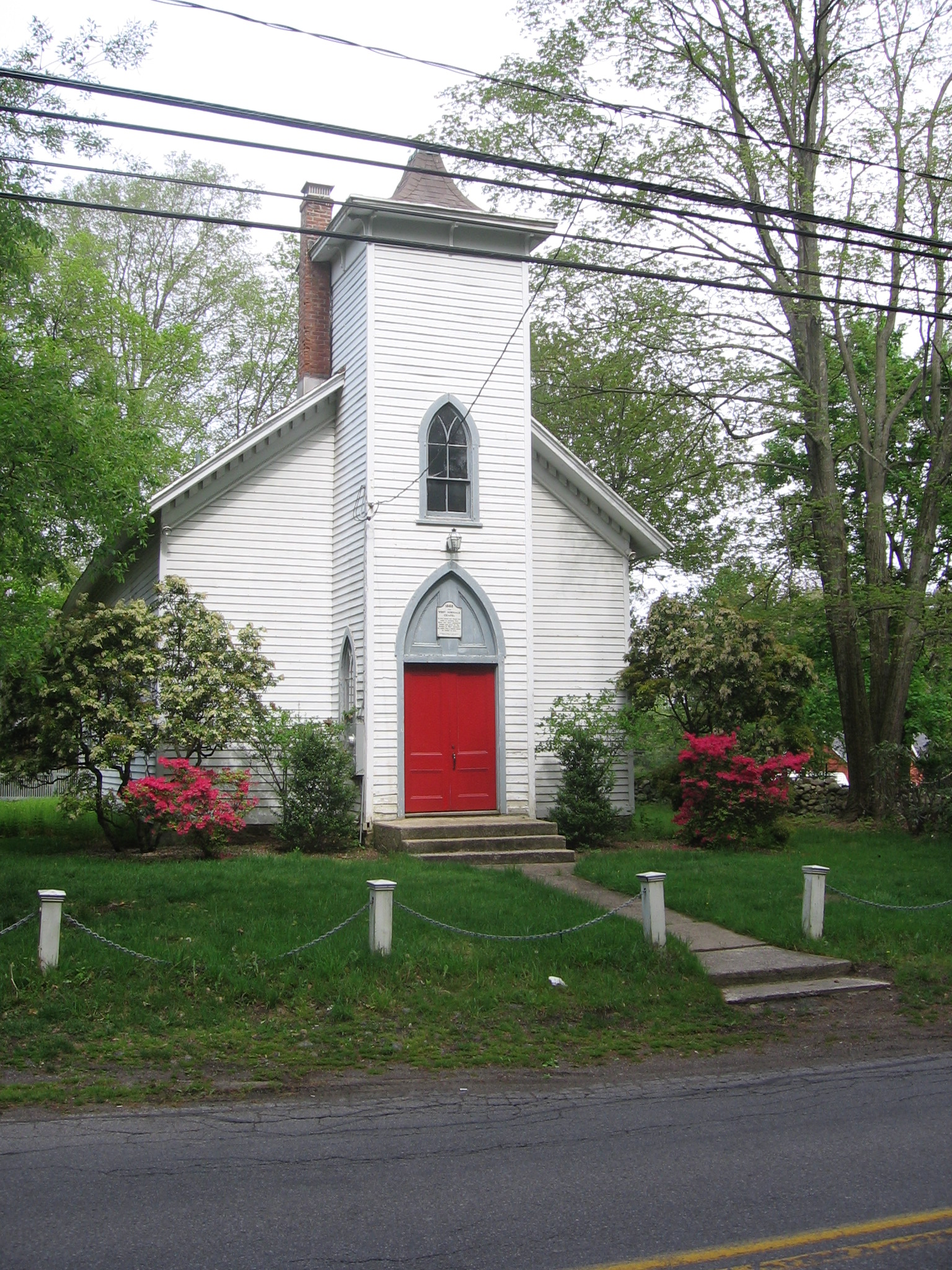
- West Norwalk Meeting House, May 5, 2012
- Interactive map of West Norwalk
- Country: United States
- State: Connecticut
- County: Fairfield
- City: Norwalk
- Time zone: UTC-5:00 (Eastern)
  - Summer (DST): UTC-4:00 (Eastern)
- Area code: 203

West Norwalk is a residential neighborhood in the city of Norwalk, Connecticut in the Connecticut Panhandle region of Fairfield County. It lies in the western central part of the city.

== Geography ==
According to the West Norwalk Association West Norwalk is defined by New Canaan Avenue (Route 123) to the North, West Cedar Street to the South and the town lines of Darien and New Canaan to the West. The eastern boundary is an irregular line generally defined by North Taylor Avenue, Steppingstone Road and Maher Drive. However, some of the businesses along the Boston Post Road (Connecticut Avenue) south of Cedar Street consider themselves to be in West Norwalk. Informally West Norwalk is bounded to the South by Brookside and Rowayton, to the west by Darien, to the northwest by New Canaan, to the north by Silvermine, and to the east by the Broad River neighborhood of Norwalk. The Five Mile River forms the boundary between West Norwalk and the town of Darien. Within West Norwalk along the Five Mile River lie Millard and Florsheim ponds and is the home to a great deal of wildlife. There has been flooding along the River recently with appeals to government agencies to help solve the problems that homeowners have faced.

== Buildings and landmarks ==
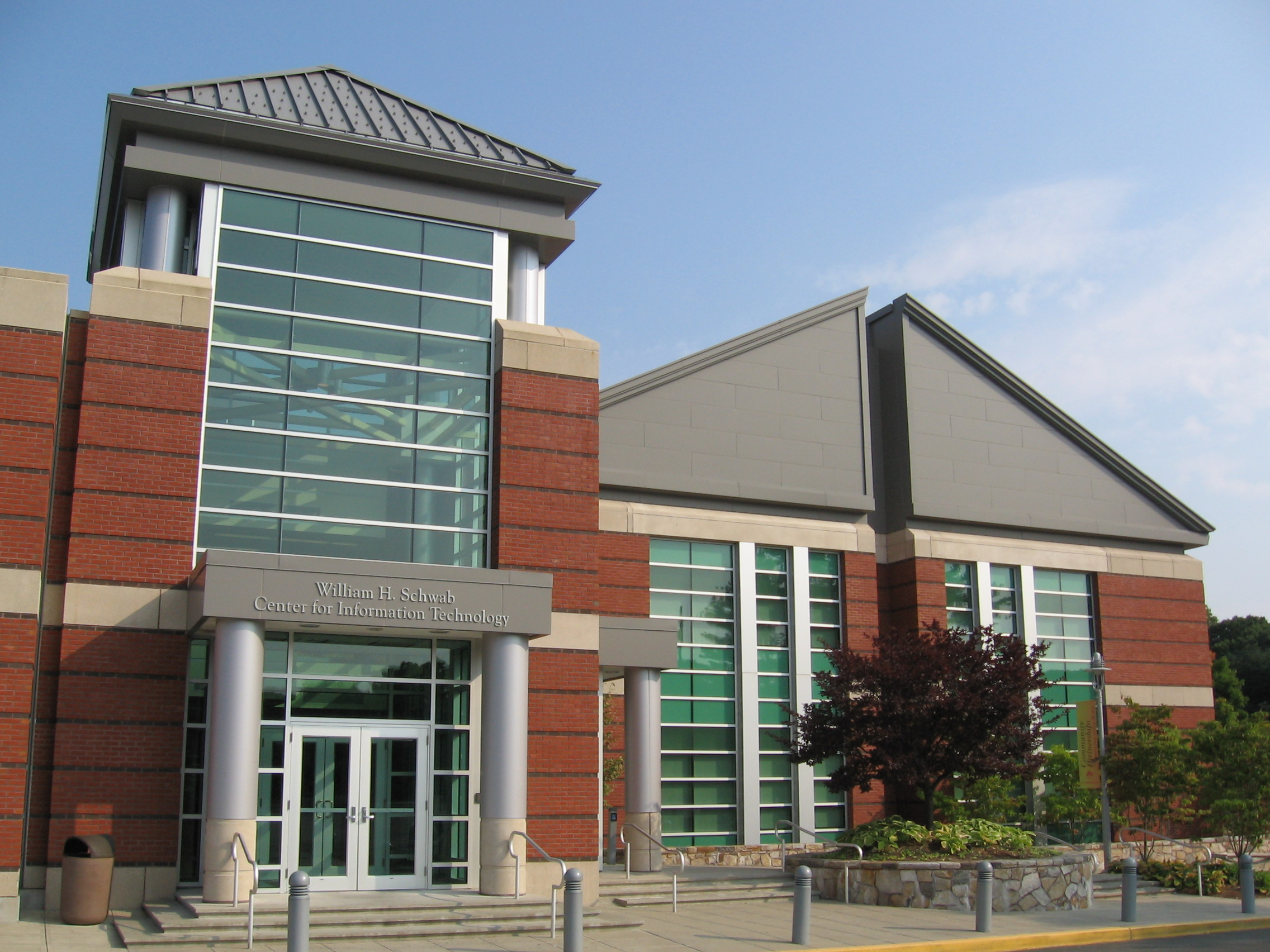
William H. Schwab Center for Information Technology at Norwalk Community College's, West Campus

According to the Norwalk portion of the "Historic Resources Inventory" (HRI) there are ten existing houses that were built between 1740 and 1800 within West Norwalk. The HRI also lists sixteen existing houses built between 1801 and 1850 and another eight built in the last half of the 19th century. In addition to historic houses, West Norwalk has miles of historic stone walls.

One of the notable landmarks in the neighborhood is the chapel which is now also referred to as "the meeting house". It is at 186 West Norwalk Road and was built in 1868. It is used nowadays for community activities such as civic group meetings. There is a Northern Arborvitae along West Norwalk Road that has attained a 138-point score on the State of Connecticut Notable Trees Project scale.

Oak Hills Park Golf Course is an 18-hole municipal golf course in the neighborhood that is open to the public. The course was designed by Alfred Tull and opened in 1969 and is located at 165 Fillow Street. The Oak Hills Tennis Center with 8 outdoor courts is located next to the golf course. The Dolce International Center (on the grounds of a former monastery features several hiking and jogging trails.

The West Norwalk Association was incorporated in 1947. The association posts signs at the borders of the neighborhood and conducts regularly scheduled meetings in the meeting house for discussion of community concerns.

== Education ==
Within West Norwalk are the Fox Run Elementary School, Ponus Ridge Middle School, and the Norwalk Community College Campus. The United Congregational Church at 275 Richards Avenue runs a nursery school for pre-school aged children.
