= Brigg (disambiguation) =

Brigg is a town in North Lincolnshire, England.

Brigg may also refer to:

- Brigg (UK Parliament constituency), a former constituency centred on the town
- Brigg Urban District, Lincolnshire, England, a former urban district
- Brigg railway station, serving the town
- Charles Brigg, founder of the London company "Brigg – Umbrella, Cane & Whip Maker" in 1836, later named Thomas Brigg & Sons after his son
- John Brigg (1834–1911), British politician
- Kane Brigg (born 1988), Australian retired high jumper and triple jumper
- Brigg Jenner, a fictional character in the My Super Psycho Sweet 16 film trilogy

== See also ==
- Brigg Town F.C., a football club based in the town
- Brigg Britannia F.C., a former football club based in the town
- Brigg and Cleethorpes (UK Parliament constituency), a former constituency
- Brigg and Goole (UK Parliament constituency), a former constituency
- Brigg and Scunthorpe (UK Parliament constituency), a former constituency
- Brig (disambiguation)
- Briggs (disambiguation)
