= Bob Miller (American football) =

American football player (1929–2006)

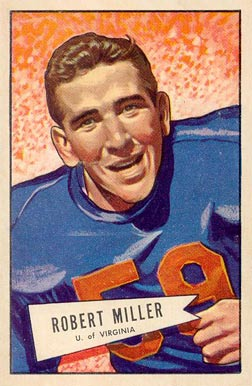
- Miller on a 1952 Bowman football card

No. 74
- Positions: Defensive tackle, offensive tackle

Personal information
- Born: December 11, 1929; Norwalk, Connecticut, U.S.
- Died: August 7, 2006 (aged 76); Clarkston, Michigan, U.S.
- Listed height: 6 ft 3 in (1.91 m)
- Listed weight: 242 lb (110 kg)

Career information
- High school: Norwalk
- College: Virginia
- NFL draft: 1952: 5th round, 58th overall pick

Career history
- Detroit Lions (1952–1958)

Awards and highlights
- 3× NFL champion (1952, 1953, 1957)

Career NFL statistics
- Games played: 81
- Games started: 54
- Fumble recoveries: 5
- Stats at Pro Football Reference

Robert Marguesse Miller (December 11, 1929 - August 7, 2006) was an American football offensive/defensive tackle with the Detroit Lions of the National Football League (NFL) from 1952 to 1958.

Born in Norwalk, Connecticut, he attended the University of Virginia, which finished 8-1 and ranked 13th in the Associated Press poll in his final year in 1951.

After being selected by Detroit in the fifth round of the 1952 NFL draft, he was on the teams which won NFL championships in 1952, 1953 and 1957, and also the team which lost the title game in 1954. He was selected an all-conference defensive tackle in 1956 by The Sporting News. After retiring from football, he was the president and owner of Cavalier Manufacturing. In the 1970s he became a licensed horse trainer, breeder and owner of thoroughbred racing stable Del-Rob Farm along with his wife Delphine (the Del in Del-Rob). Delphine recently passed on August 4, 2018, at the age of 89 of natural causes.

He died of cancer at age 76 in Clarkston, Michigan.

He was inducted into the Virginia Sports Hall of Fame in 2006.
