= New Brunswick Route 770 =

Highway in New Brunswick, Canada

Coordinates: 45.324996°N 66.85524°W

Route 770

Route information
- Maintained by New Brunswick Department of Transportation
- Length: 58 km (36 mi)

Major junctions
- West end: Route 127 in Leverville
- East end: Route 172 in Saint George

Location
- Country: Canada
- Province: New Brunswick

Highway system
- Provincial highways in New Brunswick; Former routes
← Route 760	→ Route 772

Route 770 is a 58.1-kilometre (36.1 mi) long mostly west–east secondary highway in the southwestern portion of New Brunswick, Canada.

== Route description ==
Most of the route is in Charlotte County.

The route's western terminus is in the community of Leverville at Route 127, where it travels northeast through a densely wooded area to Hewitt. From here, it continues to Rollingdam and crosses the Digdeguash River. Then, the road passes Craig Lake, enters Whittier Ridge, and continues to Clarence Ridge. From here, the route turns almost due north, then east as it meets up with the Magaguadavic River at Piskahegan and follows it south past Grassy Islands, Alder Island, Turnover Island, and Cox Island. The route then passes Lee Settlement, Second Falls, and Bonny River. The section of road between Piskahegan and Lee Settlement is also known as "River Road". As the route continues, it passes Vernon Island close to Canal and Lake Utopia. The final stretch of the route enters Saint George, crosses under Route 1, and ends at Route 172 near the Magaguadavic Basin.
