= St. George, New Brunswick =

Unincorporated settlement in New Brunswick, Canada

St. George
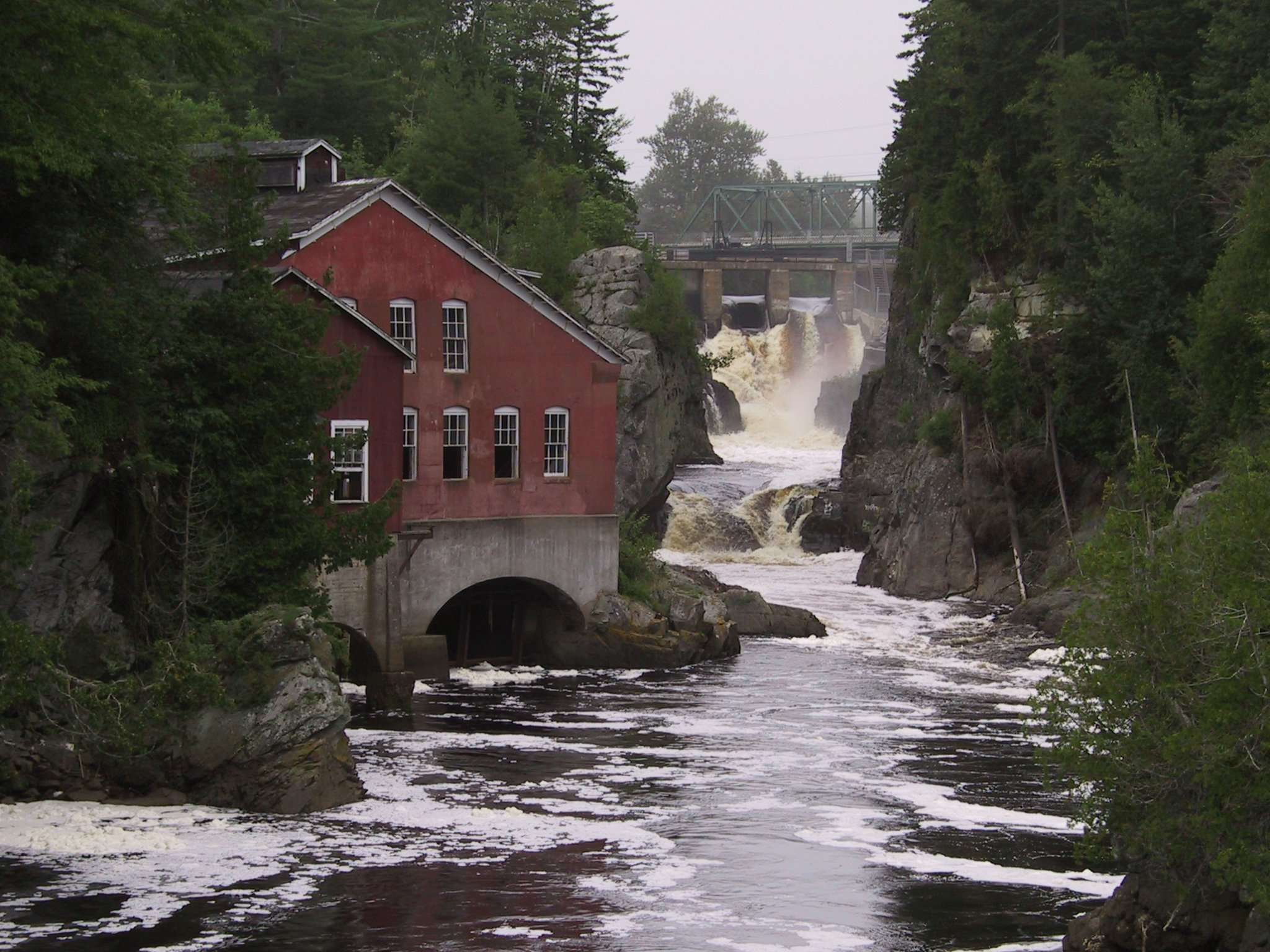
- Magaguadavic River gorge and the St. George Power hydro plant

- Seal
- Nickname: Granite Town
- Motto: A Community Strong
- Location within New Brunswick.
- Coordinates: 45°08′N 66°49′W
- Country: Canada
- Province: New Brunswick
- County: Charlotte
- Municipality: Eastern Charlotte
- Settled: 1783
- Incorporated: 1904

Area
  - Land: 16.17 km^{2} (6.24 sq mi)

Population (2021)
  - Total: 1,579
  - Density: 97.7/km^{2} (253/sq mi)
  - Change (2016–21): ▲4.1%
  - Dwellings: 751
- Time zone: UTC-4 (AST)
  - Summer (DST): UTC-3 (ADT)
- Postal code(s): E5C
- Area code: 506
- Highways Route 1 Route 172: Route 760; Route 770
- Website: www.townofstgeorge.com

St. George is a community in the Rural Community of Eastern Charlotte, in Charlotte County, New Brunswick, Canada; it was a town until the end of 2022 and is now part of the rural community of Eastern Charlotte. It is located where the Magaguadavic River flows into the Bay of Fundy, between Passamaquoddy Bay and Lake Utopia.

== History ==
The area was surveyed in 1786. First called Magaguadavic, it was renamed Granite Town after the nearby red-granite quarries. In 1829 it was renamed to the current name, and a post office was established. By 1898 the town's port served the Shore Line Railway, and there were three hotels, four churches, 22 stores, and two mills. It was incorporated as a town in 1904.

During the Second World War, two military bases were opened near the town: A Canadian Army training base known as "Camp Utopia" and a RCAF/RAF Air Station at Pennfield Ridge. By the late 1950s, both bases were closed; Camp Utopia relocated to Camp Gagetown, later CFB Gagetown, and the airfield at Pennfield Ridge served as the first commercial airport for the city of Saint John. From 1983 to 1985, Adex Mining Inc. operated a tungsten/molybdenum mine 40 km (25 mi) north of the town, at Mount Pleasant. Primary employers are aquaculture and a J. D. Irving lumber mill, Lake Utopia Paper.

St. George Power runs a hydroelectric generating station on the Magaguadavic River. It has an installed capacity of 15 MW. It is a run of the river plant, meaning there is no water storage in reservoirs as there is at the Mactaquac Dam.

On 1 January 2023, St. George amalgamated with the village of Blacks Harbour and all or part of five local service districts to form the incorporated rural community of Eastern Charlotte. The community's name remains in official use.

== Demographics ==
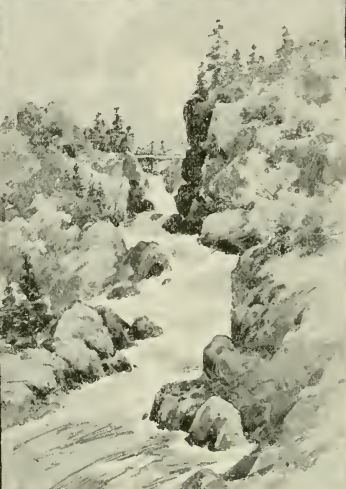
An 1893 sketch of the falls in St. George

In the 2021 Census of Population conducted by Statistics Canada, St. George had a population of 1,579 living in 698 of its 751 total private dwellings, a change of 4.1% from its 2016 population of 1,517. With a land area of 16.17 km^{2} (6.24 sq mi), it had a population density of 97.6/km^{2} (252.9/sq mi) in 2021.

Canada census – St. George, New Brunswick community profile

	2021	2016	2011
Population	1,579 (+4.1% from 2016)	1,517 (-1.7% from 2011)	1,543 (+2.1% from 2006)
Land area	16.17 km^{2} (6.24 sq mi)	16.17 km^{2} (6.24 sq mi)	16.13 km^{2} (6.23 sq mi)
Population density	97.7/km^{2} (253/sq mi)	93.8/km^{2} (243/sq mi)	95.6/km^{2} (248/sq mi)
Median age	47.2 (M: 46.4, F: 48)	45.3 (M: 44.1, F: 46.3)	42.3 (M: 40.6, F: 43.4)
Private dwellings	700 (total)	681 (total)	673 (total)
Median household income	$68,500	$61,472	$58,391

Notes: Includes corrections and updates for 2006 data
References: 2021 2016 2011

Historical Census Data - St. George, New Brunswick

Year	Pop.	±%
1901	733	—
1911	988	+34.8%
1921	1,110	+12.3%
1931	1,087	−2.1%
1941	1,169	+7.5%
1951	1,263	+8.0%

Year	Pop.	±%
1961	1,133	−10.3%
1981	1,195	+5.5%
1986	1,305	+9.2%
1991	1,345	+3.1%
1996	1,414	+5.1%
2001	1,509	+6.7%

Year	Pop.	±%
2006	1,309	−13.3%
2006A	1,512	+15.5%
2011	1,543	+2.1%
2016	1,517	−1.7%
2021	1,579	+4.1%

(A) population and dwelling count amendments

=== Language ===
Canada Census Mother Tongue - St. George, New Brunswick 2006 language data inaccurate due to unresolved census errors
Census	Total	English			French			English & French			Other		
Year	Responses	Count	Trend	Pop %	Count	Trend	Pop %	Count	Trend	Pop %	Count	Trend	Pop %
2021	1,570	1,370	▲	87.2%	30	n/a%		5	n/a%		145	▲	
2016	1,505	1,345	▼3.6%	90.9%	30	▼25%	1.99%	5	n/a%	0.33%	105	▲23.5%	6.98%
2011	1,525	1,395	▲13.9%	91.48%	40	▼27.3%	2.62%	5	n/a%	0.33%	85	▲183.3%	5.57%
2006	1,310	1,225	▼13.7%	93.51%	55	▼31.2%	4.20%	0	0.0%	0.00%	30	▲200.0%	2.29%
2001	1,510	1,420	▲6.0%	94.04%	80	▲23.1%	5.30%	0	0.0%	0.00%	10	▲ n/a%	0.66%
1996	1,405	1,340	n/a	95.37%	65	n/a	4.63%	0	n/a	0.00%	0	n/a	0.00%

== St. George Mall ==
St. George features a small local mall located on Brunswick Street.
