= Alexander Briggs House =

Historic house in Illinois, United States

- U.S. National Register of Historic Places
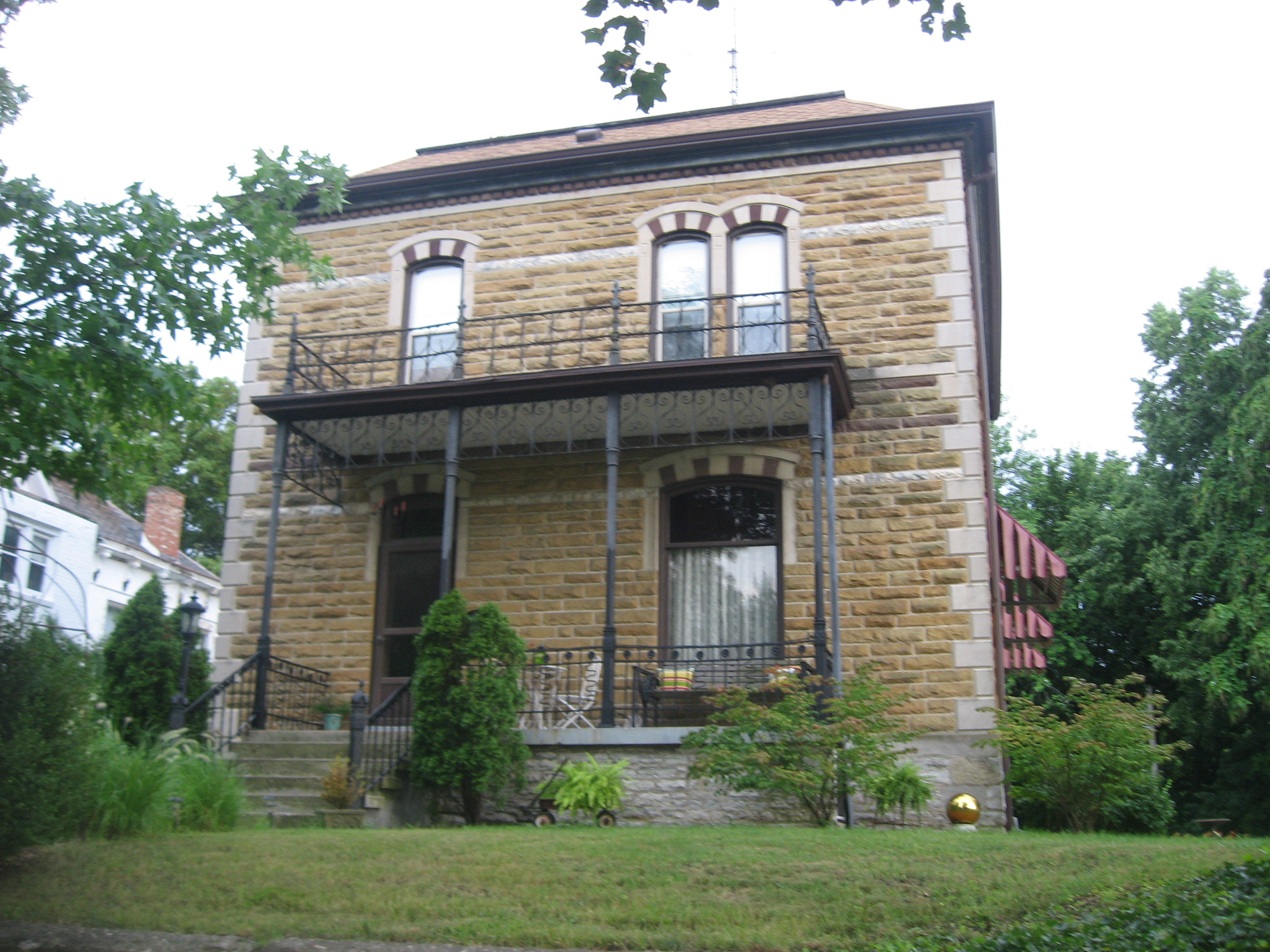

- Location within Illinois Location within the United States
- Location: 210 Jackson St., Charleston, Illinois
- Coordinates: 39°29′38″N 88°10′45″W
- Area: less than one acre
- Built: 1894
- Built by: Briggs, Alexander
- Architectural style: Renaissance Revival, Italianate
- NRHP reference No.: 80001341
- Added to NRHP: May 31, 1980

The Alexander Briggs House is a historic house located at 210 Jackson St. in Charleston, Illinois. Prominent local stonemason Alexander Briggs built the stone house in 1894; it is the only stone house remaining in Coles County. The house's design incorporates features of the Italianate and Renaissance Revival styles; the combination is unusual, as the Renaissance Revival style was rarely used in small houses. Briggs built the house with multicolored sandstone and used marble and granite to form decorative belt courses and quoins, giving the house its Renaissance Revival appearance. The house's Italianate elements include its tall, narrow arched windows and its gently sloping roof.

The house was added to the National Register of Historic Places on May 31, 1980.
