= Norwalk High School (Connecticut) =

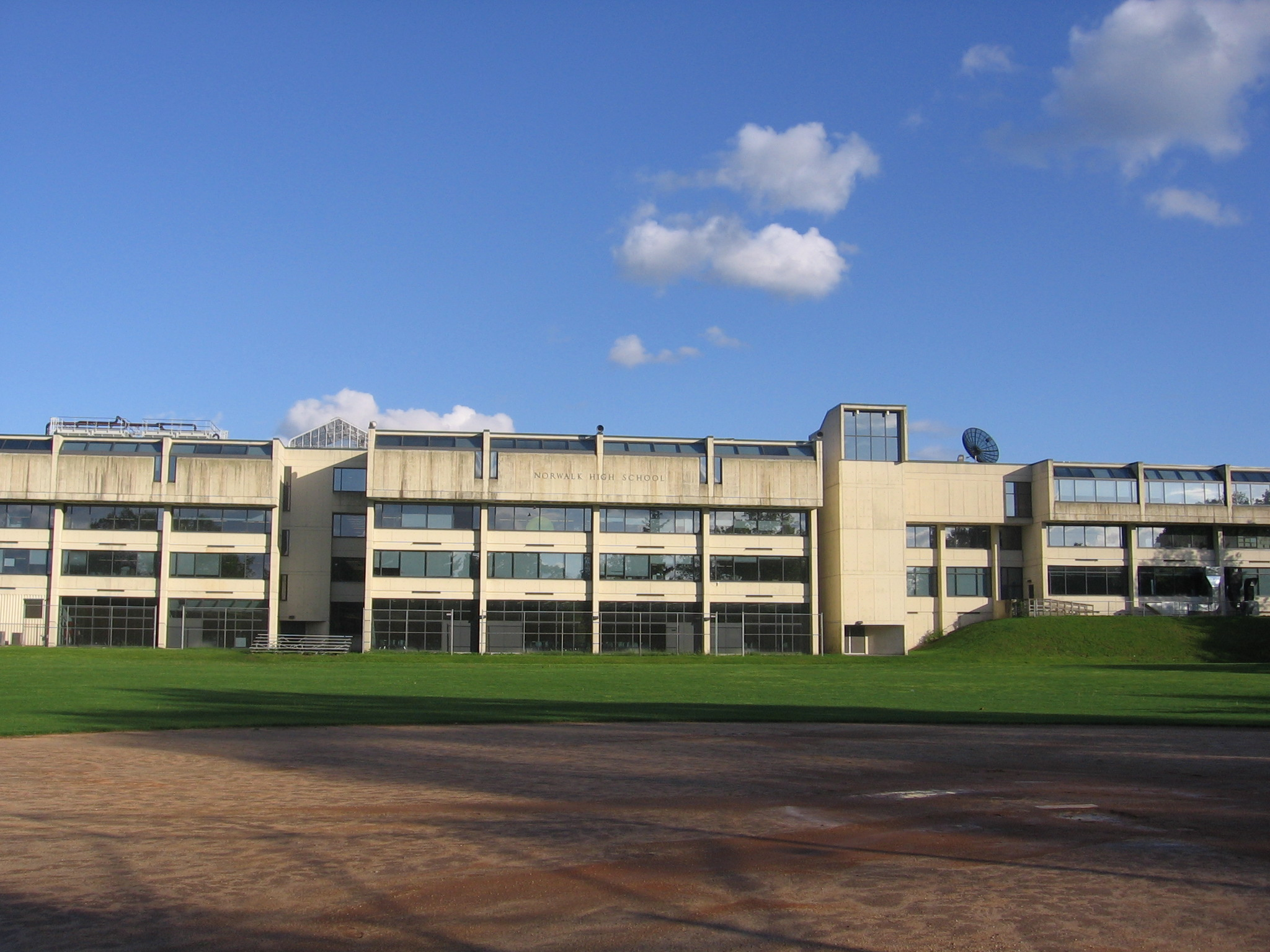

Location
- 55 County Street; Norwalk, Connecticut 06851; United States; 41°7′19″N 73°23′22″W

Information
- Type: Public
- Established: 1902 (124 years ago)
- School district: Norwalk Public Schools
- Superintendent: Alexandra Estrella
- CEEB code: 070580
- Principal: Lynne Moore
- Teaching staff: 112.25 (FTE)
- Grades: 9-12
- Enrollment: 1,547 (2023-2024)
- Student to teacher ratio: 13.78
- Colors: Green and white
- Mascot: Bear
- Nickname: Bears
- Website: nhs.norwalkps.org

Norwalk High School is a high school located in Norwalk, Connecticut, United States, which was established in 1902. It is the oldest high school in Norwalk and was originally housed in the current Norwalk City Hall. The first graduating class for the current building was in 1975.

== Background ==
The school mascot is a bear and the school colors are green and white. Its crosstown rival is Brien McMahon High School and the two schools compete in an annual football game on Thanksgiving. The $4.2 million Shea-Magrath Sports Complex, which includes the astroturf Testa Field, sits just to the south of the school. It replaced Andrews Field, located 1/4 mile west of the school. The school is a member of the FCIAC athletic conference. The school also contains a theater, gymnasium, swimming pool, library, and cafeteria.

The school is divided into five lettered houses (A, B, C, D, and S) with a housemaster in charge of students in his/her house. Norwalk High School also has a Science wing that was built in the mid-late 2000s. Students are assigned lockers, homerooms, and guidance counselors within their house.

== Athletics ==
The NHS Bears girls' basketball team won the FCIAC championship in 1999, and then lost in the Class LL state championship in 1999. They then won another FCIAC championship in 2007, and won the Class LL state championship in 2019.

The NHS Bears boys' soccer team won the 2002 FCIAC championship. They then advanced to the FCIAC championship and Class LL state championship in 2004. The NHS Bears boys' team won the 2012 FCIAC state championship, and played for the FCIAC championship again in 2021.

The NHS Bears baseball team won the FCIAC championship in 2002.

The NHS Bears outdoor track team won the FCIAC championship in 1967 and 1995.

West Rocks Middle School and Nathan Hale Middle School feed into Norwalk High School.

== Notable alumni ==
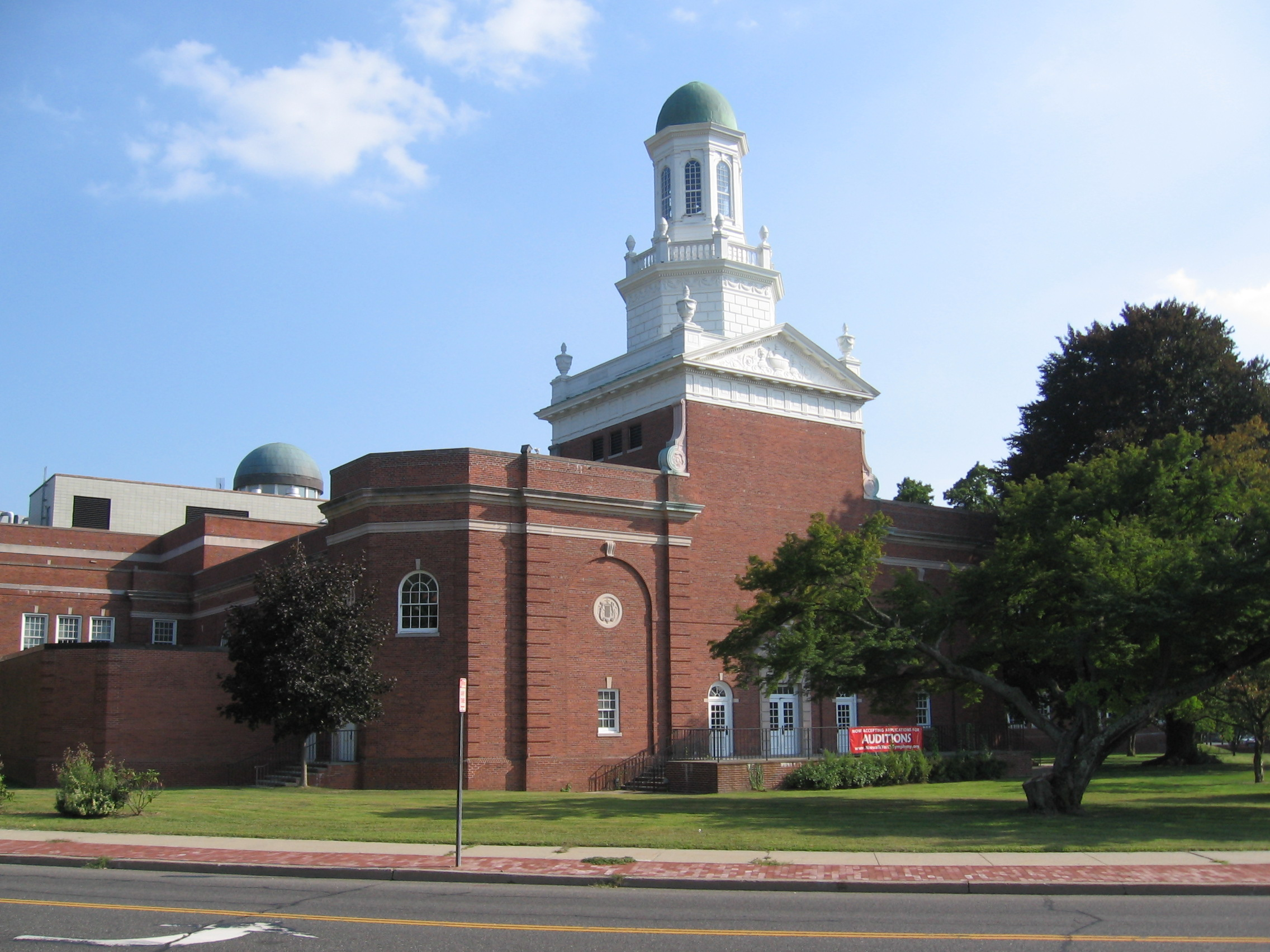
Former high school building, now City Hall

- D. J. Caruso, movie and television director and producer
- Harry Connolly, football player
- Bob Duff, member of the Connecticut Senate
- Cam Edwards, college football running back for the UConn Huskies
- Steven Enoch, basketball player
- Paul Gerken, professional tennis player
- Jason Goldman, musician
- Dr. Edward C. Kendall, 1950 Nobel Prize winner in physiology
- Mickey Kydes, professional soccer player
- Mia Love, mayor of Saratoga Springs, Utah (2010–2014) and U.S. representative for Utah's 4th congressional district (2015–2019)
- John D. Magrath, Congressional Medal of Honor honoree for actions taken during World War II
- Forrest McClendon, 1983, actor, notable for his role in The Scottsboro Boys
- Brien McMahon, former United States senator and the first chairman of the Joint Committee on Atomic Energy; namesake of Brien McMahon High School
- Vince Mendoza, Emmy Award-winning composer and arranger
- Bob Miller, former National Football League player with the Detroit Lions.
- Calvin Murphy, former National Basketball Association player with the Houston Rockets, inducted into the Basketball Hall of Fame in 1993
- Todd Philcox, former National Football League player with the Cincinnati Bengals, Cleveland Browns, and San Diego Chargers
- Daniel J. Shea, posthumously received the Congressional Medal of Honor for actions taken during the Vietnam War
- Horace Silver, jazz pianist and composer
- Adam Nussbaum, jazz drummer
