= Henshie–Briggs Row House =

Historic house in Iowa, United States

- U.S. National Register of Historic Places
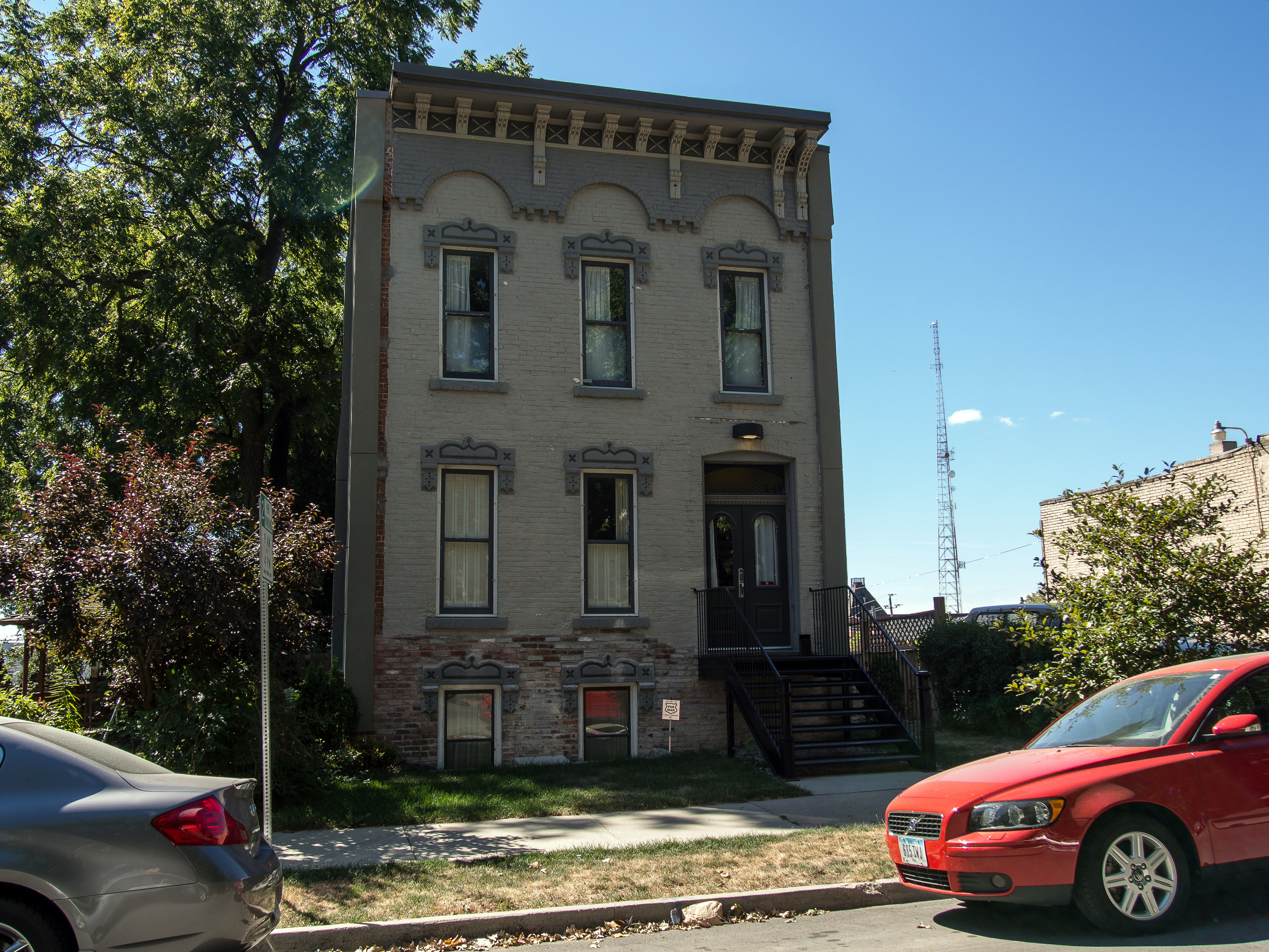

- Location within Iowa Location within the United States
- Location: 1106 High St., Des Moines, Iowa
- Coordinates: 41°35′16.5″N 93°38′22.5″W
- Area: less than one acre
- Built: 1883
- Architectural style: Italianate
- NRHP reference No.: 01000855
- Added to NRHP: August 8, 2001

The Henshie–Briggs Row House is a historic building in Des Moines, Iowa, United States. While the row house was a popular building form in the 19th century in the city, there are very few examples that remain. The two-story, brick, Italianate structure was completed in 1883. The single-family dwelling features brick load-bearing walls, a flat roof, and a wooden cornice. The house was listed on the National Register of Historic Places in 2001. It was moved to its current location on Woodland Avenue in 2008.
