= Lake Utopia (New Brunswick) =

Lake in Charlotte County, New Brunswick, Canada

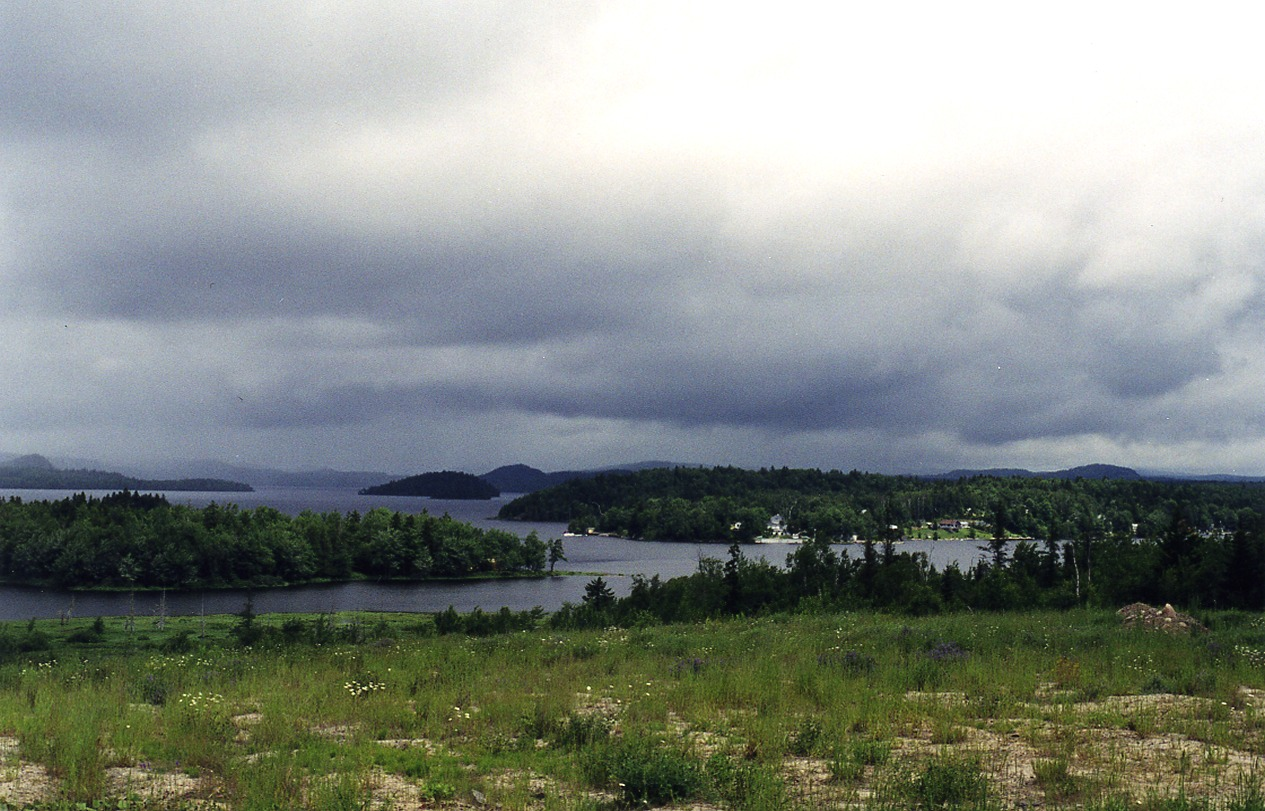
- Lake Utopia from the south, July 7, 2002

- Location within New Brunswick
- Location: Saint George Parish, Charlotte County, New Brunswick
- Coordinates: 45°10′11″N 66°47′40″W
- Basin countries: Canada
- Max. length: 7 km (4.3 mi)
- Max. width: 2.8 km (1.7 mi)

Lake Utopia is located in eastern Charlotte County, New Brunswick.

The southern shore of the lake is one kilometre northeast of the town of St. George. The lake is connected to the Magaguadavic River by the second deepest natural canal in the world. Lake Utopia is approximately 7 kilometres long and between 0.8 and 2.8 kilometres in width. The lake level varies throughout the year, as more or less water is allowed through a hydroelectric dam on the Magaguadavic River in St. George. The lake is surrounded by mixed Acadian forest and its shoreline has been traditionally dotted by both rustic camps and large summer homes however over the last decade an increase in year-round home development has occurred. The lake has six islands which are privately owned and situated with seasonal cottages. During the winter months, much of the lake completely freezes.

Lake Utopia is a popular eastern Charlotte County recreation destination among year-round residents and cottage-goers for swimming, boating and fishing. Fish in the lake include smallmouth bass, trout, perch and river eels.

On the western side of the lake is Canal Beach. Canal Beach is the major swimming destination on the lake's western shore. Its natural sand occupies a 0.5 kilometre stretch of shoreline. The beach/park is maintained and operated by the Town of St. George, and is open from the first weekend of June to weekend after Labour Day. Despite being a public beach, there is no lifeguard on duty. Canal Beach is equipped with a beach volleyball court, playground, seasonal canteen, washrooms and changing rooms. Immediately north of Canal Beach is the natural canal that connects the lake to the Magaguadavic River. Further north, still on the western shore of the lake, is Grey Mountain. Much of the northern area of the lake's western shore is untouched with only a few cottages.

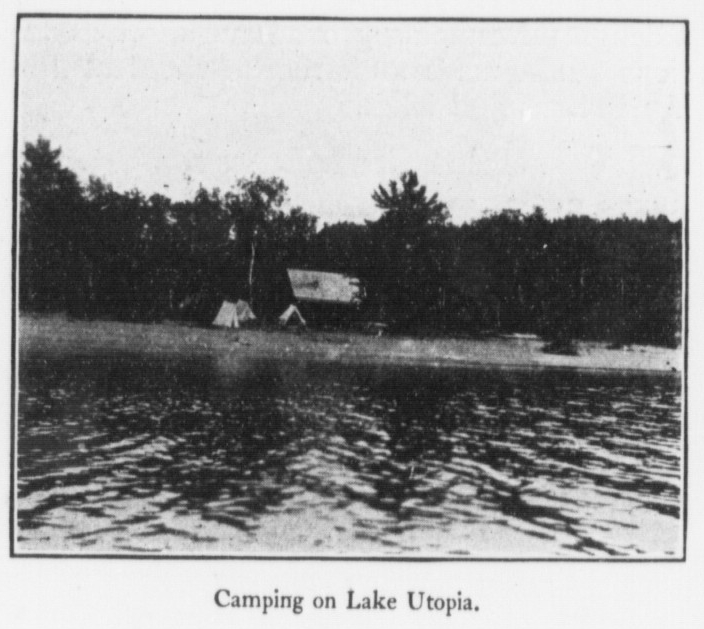
1905 image of tents set up alongside Lake Utopia

On the northern shore of the lake was a smaller, less popular swimming location called "Scout's Beach" (also traditionally called "Frauley's Beach"). During the 1940s-1960s, a Scouts Canada camp was built on the north shore of the lake. The camp was later owned and maintained by Connors Bros. Ltd. After the decline of its operation, Scout's Beach became known locally as a "party spot" and was host to two or three large gatherings every summer during the 1970s-1980s. In the early 2000s, the land was sold by Connors Bros. Ltd. to a private developer and a number of homes were constructed, including a very large private estate. The beach area is now private, restricted to public use.

On the lake's eastern shore, near a spot locally known as "the Bluff", during the early 1900s, "Bryn Derwyn", a summer hotel which was later a summer camp for boys operated until it burned in June 1918. The boys camp continued through the 1920s. During the 1960s, local company Connors Bros. Ltd., who owned much of the eastern shore at that time, operated a public beach. The beach was a popular spot with concession stands and amusement rides. Much of the lake's eastern shore is developed with both cottages and year-round homes, and connected via Route 785.

== Islands ==
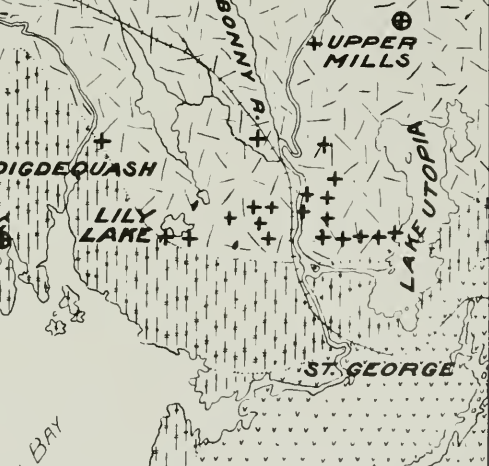
A 1914 chart showing Lake Utopia

Lake Utopia is home to six (6) islands. Situated north to south, the islands are:

- Duck Island
- Long Island
- Small Island
- Big Island
- Spruce Island
- Cannonball Island
- Grassy Island

All of the islands are privately owned and have seasonal cottages. Located in the southern part of the lake, "Cannonball Island" was used as bombing practice by the nearby former Pennfield Ridge Air Station during the Second World War. In addition to island, there are several rock ledges in the lake. A pair of ledges located in the central section of the lake, along the western shore, are called "The Butterballs". Another rock ledge is located approximately 330 meters to the west of Big Island. Depending upon the water level of the lake, this ledge may be submerged and be a hazard to boaters unfamiliar with navigating the lake.

== Old Ned ==
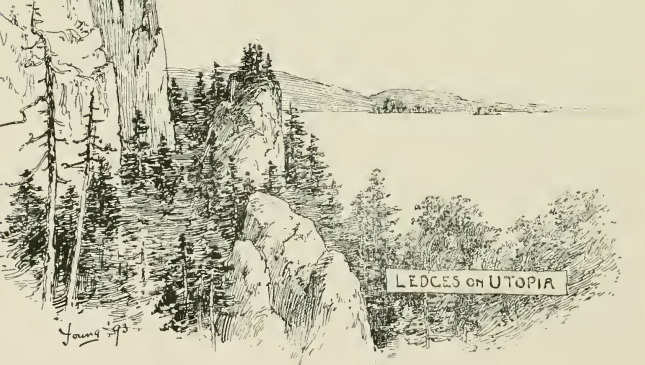
1893 sketch of Lake Utopia

Local legend says the lake is inhabited by a sea monster known as "Old Ned". The story goes that long ago two Maliseet Natives were canoeing on the lake when suddenly the monster appeared and chased them from one end to the other. It has a decidedly long and bulky cetacean appearance, is described as a toothless herbivore, and may be representative of an unknown group of animals that travel back and forth between Lake Utopia and the Atlantic Ocean.

On July 28 1908, the crew of the schooner Madagasca reported they had seen a sea serpent in the Bay of Fundy near Cutler, Maine which is presumed to be related.

It has drawn the attention of many writers.

== See also ==
- List of lakes of New Brunswick
- The Lake Utopia Preservation Association
