= Briggs Lake =

Lake in the state of Minnesota, United States

- Location within Minnesota
- Location: Sherburne County, Minnesota
- Coordinates: 45°29′54″N 93°56′21″W
- Type: lake

Briggs Lake is a lake in Sherburne County, in the U.S. state of Minnesota.

Briggs Lake was named for Josiah Briggs, a pioneer who settled near the lake.

== See also ==
- List of lakes in Minnesota
