= Canal, New Brunswick =

Canal
- Unincorporated community
- Location within New Brunswick.
- Coordinates: 45°09′30″N 66°49′37″W
- Country: Canada
- Province: New Brunswick
- County: Charlotte
- Parish: Saint Patrick
- Electoral Districts Federal: New Brunswick Southwest
- Provincial: Charlotte-The Isles

Government
  - Type: Local service district
- Time zone: UTC-4 (AST)
  - Summer (DST): UTC-3 (ADT)
- Postal code(s): E5C
- Area code: 506
- Highways: Route 770

Canal is an unincorporated community in Charlotte County, New Brunswick, Canada.

== See also ==
- List of communities in New Brunswick
