= Briggs Run =

Location
- Country: United States
- State: New York

Physical characteristics
- Mouth: Mohawk River
  - location: Yosts, New York
  - coordinates: 42°55′11″N 74°26′38″W
  - elevation: 274 ft (84 m)
- Basin size: 5.62 mi^{2} (14.6 km^{2})

Briggs Run flows into the Mohawk River near Yosts, New York.
