= Samuel and Mary Logan Briggs House =

- U.S. National Register of Historic Places
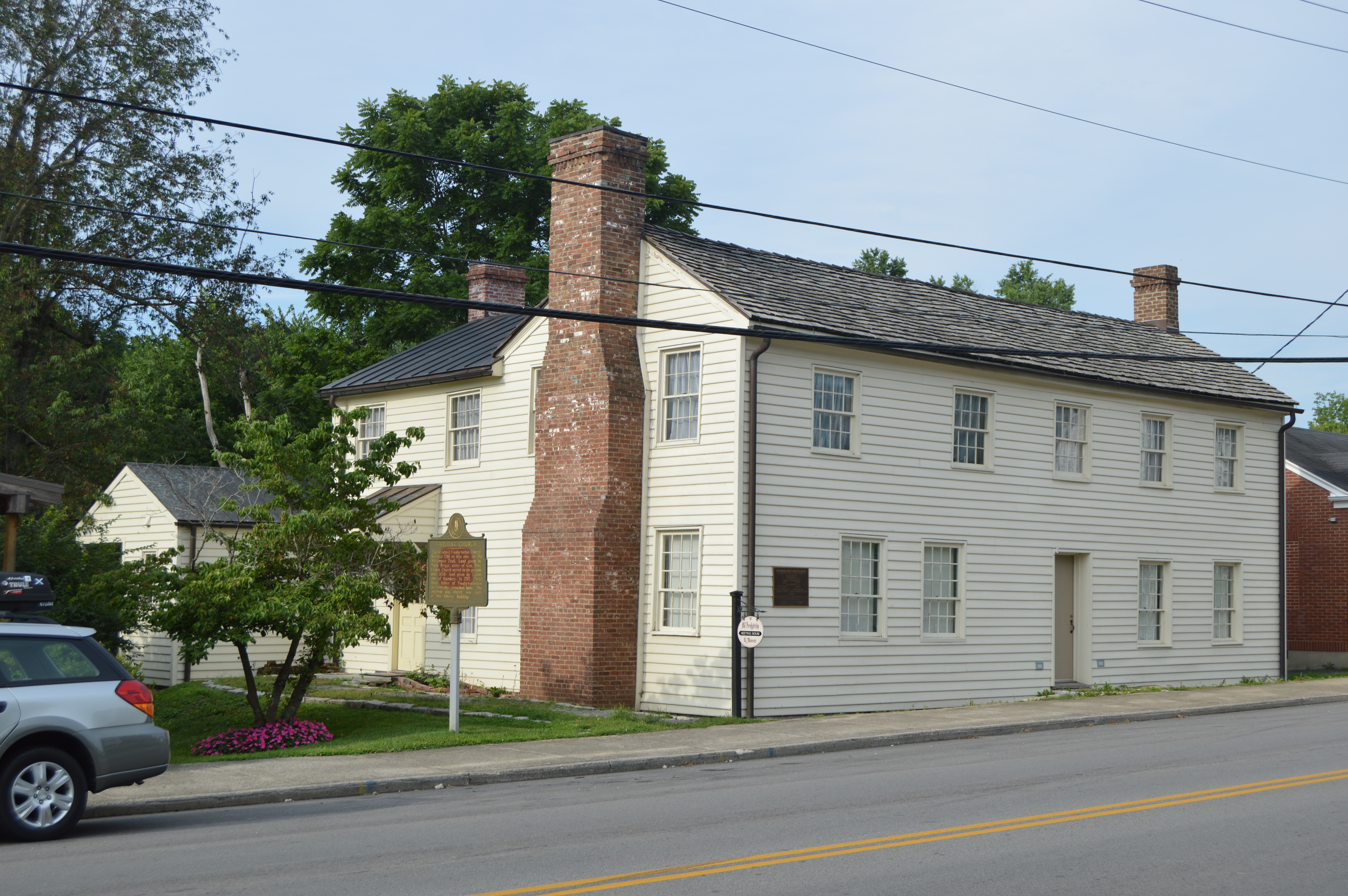
- Location: 315 W. Main St., Stanford, Kentucky
- Coordinates: 37°31′44″N 84°39′52″W
- Area: 0.5 acres (0.20 ha)
- Built: before 1790
- NRHP reference No.: 75000794
- Added to NRHP: August 28, 1975

The Samuel and Mary Logan Briggs House, at 315 W. Main St. in Stanford, Kentucky, was listed on the National Register of Historic Places in 1975. It has also been known as the Harvey Helm Historic Library & Museum.

It is a five-bay two-story weatherboarded house on the south side of what is now U.S. Route 150, but was the Old Wilderness Road from the Cumberland Gap into Kentucky and to the Falls of the Ohio. It was built before 1790.

It was the first location of the Stanford Presbyterian Church.
