= George I. Briggs House =

Historic house in Massachusetts, United States

- U.S. National Register of Historic Places
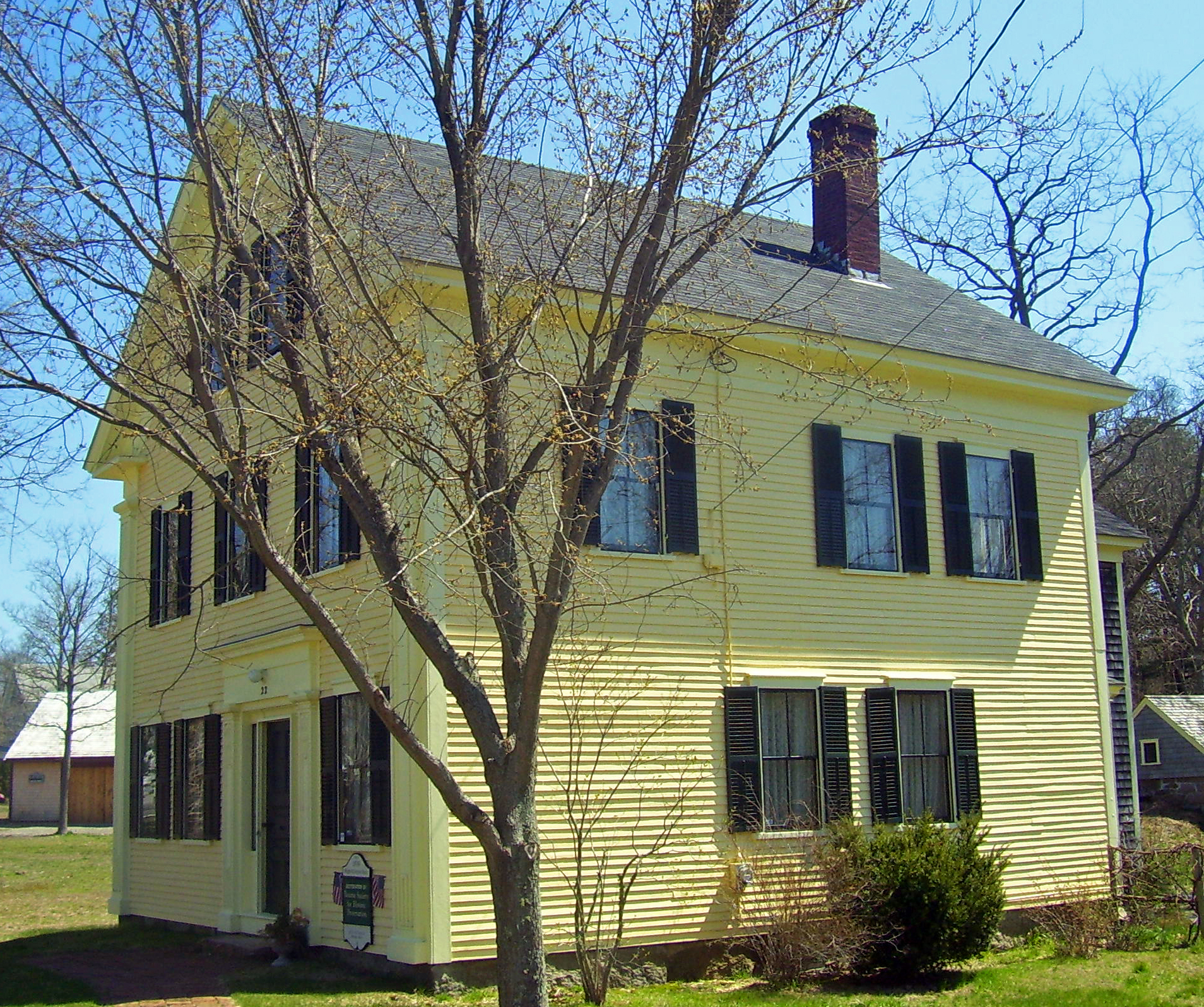
- Front (west) elevation and south profile, 2008

- Location within Cape Cod Location within Massachusetts Location within the United States
- Location: Sandwich Rd., Bourne, Massachusetts
- Coordinates: 41°44′31″N 70°35′51″W
- Area: 0.5 acres (0.20 ha)
- Built: 1802
- Architect: Moses Keene II, et al.
- Architectural style: Greek Revival
- NRHP reference No.: 81000119
- Added to NRHP: September 10, 1981

The George I. Briggs House, locally referred to as the Briggs-McDermott House, is located along Sandwich Road in Bourne, Massachusetts, United States. It was added to the National Register of Historic Places in 1981, and currently serves as historic house museum operated by the Bourne Society for Historic Preservation.

== Description and history ==
Originally built around 1802 by Josephus Keene, the house was significantly expanded and renovated in the Greek Revival style in the 1830s by Briggs, who married Keene's granddaughter Thirza. He was later instrumental in the creation of the town of Bourne from Sandwich in 1884, serving as one of the new town's selectmen. Later he would serve on the school and library commissions, and chairman of the Barnstable County Commission.

He was a friend of U.S. President Grover Cleveland, who sometimes vacationed in the area. The shop of a local blacksmith who shod Cleveland's horses has been moved to the house property as well. The interior of the house has an 1890 ceiling mural painted by local artist Charles Raleigh.

After his death, it passed to Mercy Briggs McDermott and her husband William. They later sold it to the school district. In the 1970s the town worked to restore it, and in 1998 moved the blacksmith shop to the grounds.

== See also ==
- National Register of Historic Places listings in Barnstable County, Massachusetts
