= Brig Rock =

Island in New Zealand

- Interactive map of Brig Rock

Geography
- Coordinates: 44.524483°S 167.787251°E

Administration
- New Zealand
- Region: Southland

Demographics
- Population: uninhabited

Brig Rock is an island of the Southland Region of New Zealand. The name was chosen during the Acheron Survey.

Brig Rock is located off the coast of Milford Sound in Fiordland.

== See also ==
- List of islands of New Zealand
