= Briggs (given name) =

Briggs is a masculine given name borne by:

- Briggs Cunningham (1907–2003), American entrepreneur and sportsman
- Briggs Gordon (1949–1988), American television host
- Briggs Hopson (born 1965), American politician
- Briggs Priestley (1831–1907), English cloth manufacturer and politician
