= ConnCAN =

American education advocacy group

- Founded: 2005
- Purpose: Education research and advocacy
- Location: 85 Willow Street, New Haven, Connecticut
- Staff: 12
- Website: www.conncan.org

ConnCAN (Connecticut Coalition for Achievement Now) is an American state-level education advocacy group founded in January 2005 and located in New Haven, Connecticut.

ConnCAN describes itself as an advocacy organization leading a movement to improve public education for kids. "We bring parents, educators, policymakers, and advocates together to help ensure that all kids have access to great schools regardless of race, wealth, or zip code." Its major projects include education research reports and issue briefs, ranking Connecticut public schools, parent outreach and education, and legislative advocacy.

Campaigns

ConnCAN has run advocacy campaigns with specific policy objectives.

Its first campaign, called "Mind the Gaps", launched in 2009. The stated goal of the campaign was "advocating for three commonsense school reforms—funding to grow high-performing public charter schools, teacher quality and education transparency—to help close Connecticut’s achievement gap."

ConnCAN's 2010 campaign, "Our Race to the Top," focused on the state's application to the federal government's Race to the Top grant competition, "urging public officials to make the reforms necessary for Connecticut to be truly competitive." The campaign successfully advocated for four reforms: "measuring effectiveness," world-class standards," superstar principals," and "money follows the child."

Research and Policy

The organization runs a number of research and policy projects including public school report cards, teacher contract database, progress report on education reform, and a series of research and policy reports.

Staff and Board

A February 2007 review by the Thomas B. Fordham Foundation compared the organization's legislative agenda to that of the Delaware-based Vision 2015 plan for education reform and stated that it is "spearheaded by a large, well-credentialed Board of Directors and Advisors and is clearly serious about school reform." Jonathan Sackler served as the founding chair of the Board of Directors and founding senior staff included CEO Alex Johnston and COO Marc Porter Magee. Currently, ConnCAN has 12 full-time staff led by CEO Jennifer Alexander.

50CAN

In January 2010, ConnCAN undertook the development of a pilot program in Rhode Island to test out replication of its model in a new state. RI-CAN was formally launched in December 2010. In January 2011 this effort to bring the ConnCAN model to new states was formally spun off as an independent non-profit organization named 50CAN. Marc Porter Magee left his role as ConnCAN COO to become 50CAN's first president, later becoming the organization's CEO. 50CAN currently has a staff of 40 full-time employees are runs campaigns in seven states.
