= Magaguadavic River =

River in New Brunswick, Canada

Coordinates: 45.12296°N 66.875367°W

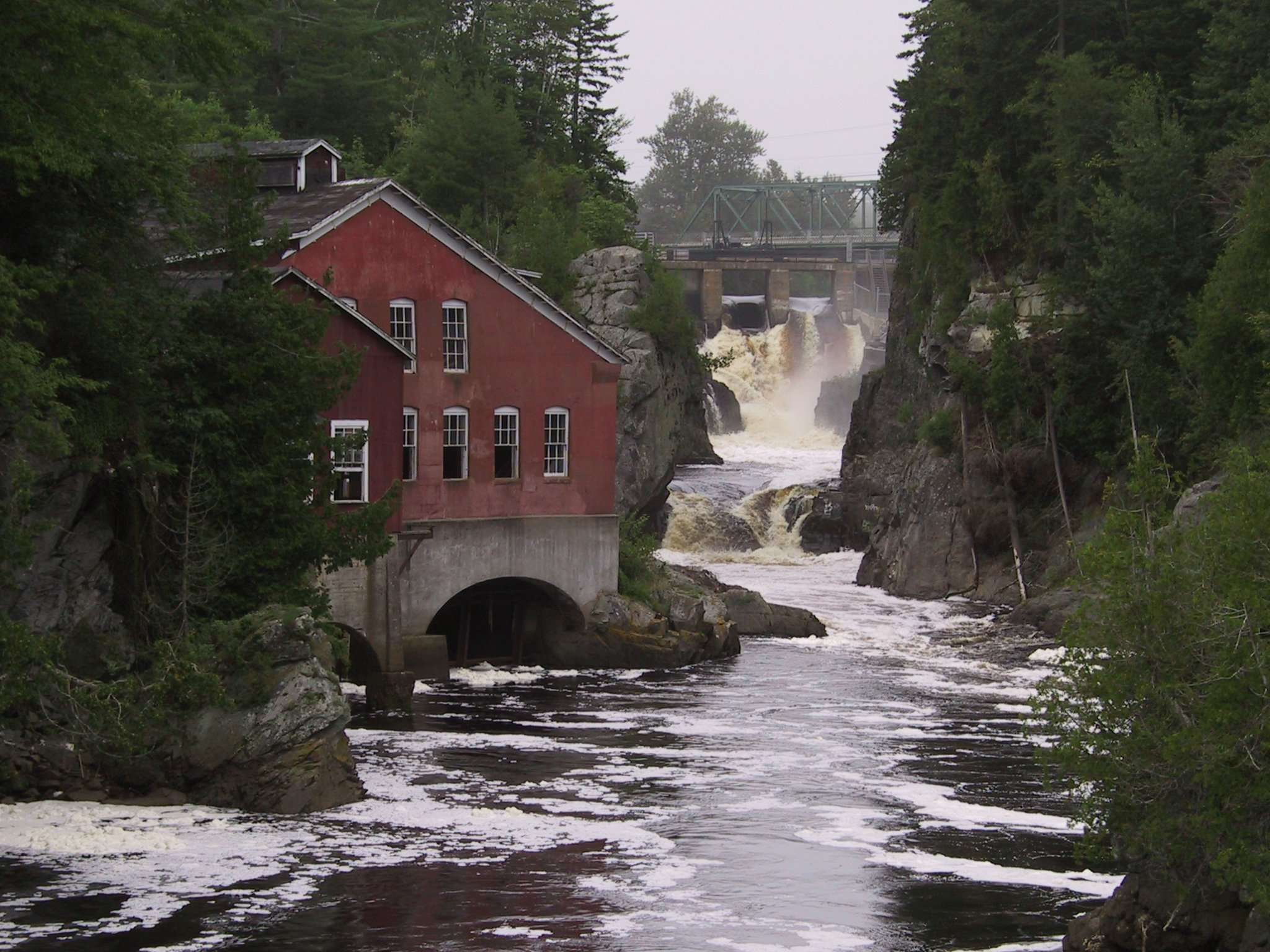
Magaguadavic River gorge in St. George

The Magaguadavic River (/ˌmæɡəˈdeɪvɪk/ mag-ə-DAY-vik; French: Rivière Magaguadavic) is a historic Canadian river located in the province of New Brunswick.

The name "Magaguadavic" is a Maliseet / Passamaquoddy term that is believed to translate into "River of Eels".

== Description ==
With a meander length of 129 km (80 mi), the Magaguadavic River is the sixth longest river in the province. It rises as an outlet of Magaguadavic Lake in York County, flowing south through a low coastal mountain range called the St. Croix Highlands before emptying into Passamaquoddy Bay, a sub-basin of the Bay of Fundy.

The river has 103 named tributaries and 55 lakes draining a watershed measuring 1,812 km^{2} (700 sq mi).

One of the tributaries drains Lake Utopia into the river and is formally named "The Canal". Occasionally if water levels in the river are high enough, the Magaguadavic will drain into Lake Utopia through The Canal first, before eventually reversing course to drain back through The Canal and discharging into Passamaquoddy Bay.

== Riverine Islands ==
- Silver Island

== Communities ==
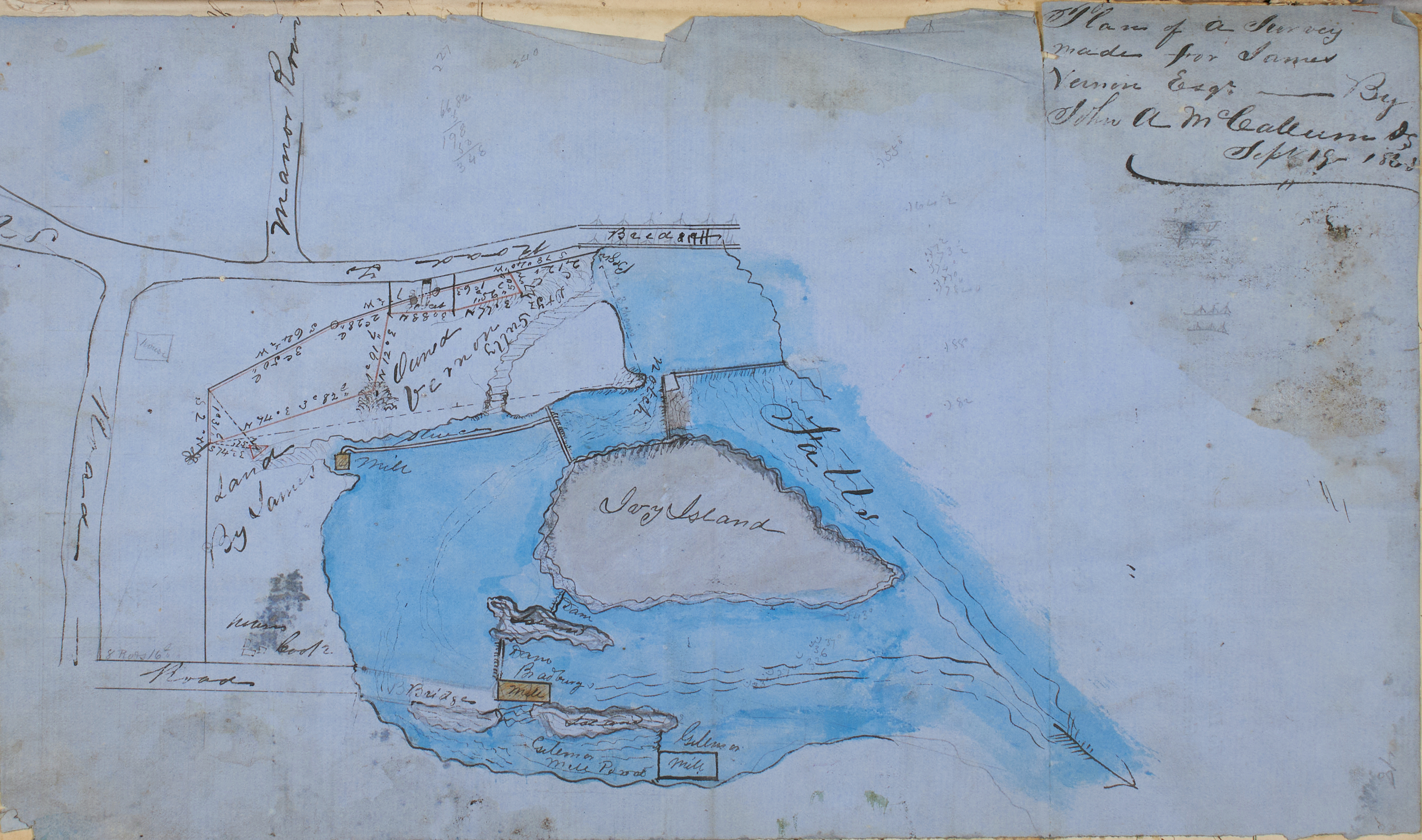
An 1860s survey showing the St. George dam feeding a sluice and two mills.

The river passes through the following communities from north to south:

York County

- Thomaston Corner
- Upper Brockway
- Brockway

Charlotte County

- Flume Ridge
- Pomeroy-Piskahegan
- Lee Settlement
- Second Falls
- Bonny River
- St. George
- Caithness *
- Mascarene *

* denotes estuary portion

== Crossings ==
There are several bridges and one dam crossing the Magaguadavic River, from north to south:

- An unnamed railway bridge carrying the New Brunswick Southern Railway (NBSR) across the river, located approximately 200 m (660 ft) south of the beginning of the river at Magaguadavic Lake. This bridge was originally constructed for the European and North American Railway and was later operated by the New Brunswick Railway and the Canadian Pacific Railway before being purchased by NBSR.
- An unnamed highway bridge carrying Route 3 across the river at Thomaston Corner.
- An unnamed highway bridge carrying Tweedside Rd across the river at Brockway.
- "Magaguadavic River No. 7" is the name for a 63 ft (19 m) covered bridge carrying Mill Rd across the river at Flume Ridge. It was built in 1905 and is a Burr Truss design.
- "Pomeroy Bridge" is the name of the highway bridge carrying Piskahegan Rd across the river at Piskahegan.
- An unnamed highway bridge carrying Red Rock Rd across the river at Second Falls.
- An unnamed highway bridge carrying Route 770 across the river at Canal. This bridge is locally known as the "Sheldon Lee Bridge" after local former provincial Liberal MLA, Sheldon Lee. The bridge was built during a period when Lee served as Minister of Transportation for New Brunswick.
- A dismantled unnamed railway bridge that once carried the Grand Southern Railway and was later operated by the Canadian Pacific Railway before being abandoned in 1988. Only foundations of the former bridge remain today.
- Two unnamed highway bridges carrying the westbound and eastbound lanes of the Route 1 expressway across the river at St. George.
- "Upper Bridge" in the town of St. George, carrying Brunswick Street across the river.
- The St. George Hydroelectric Station, owned by Saint George Pulp and Power which is a subsidiary of J.D. Irving Limited, has a dam across the river at St. George immediately upstream of a steep gorge into which the river plunges to sea level.
- "Lower Bridge" in the town of St. George, carrying South Street across the river.

The Canal is crossed by a single bridge:

- "Canal Bridge" is the name for a 127 ft (39 m) covered bridge carrying Canal Road across The Canal at Canal. It was built in 1917 and is a Howe truss design.

== See also ==
- List of rivers of New Brunswick
