= Briggs, Nebraska =

Unincorporated community in Nebraska, United States

- Unincorporated Community
- Location within Nebraska Location within the United States
- Coordinates: 41.4°N 96°W
- Country: United States
- State: Nebraska
- County: Douglas

Briggs is an unincorporated community in Douglas County, Nebraska, United States.

== History ==
A post office was established at Briggs in 1892, and remained in operation until it was discontinued in 1913.
