= Harvey, New Brunswick =

Harvey
- Rural community
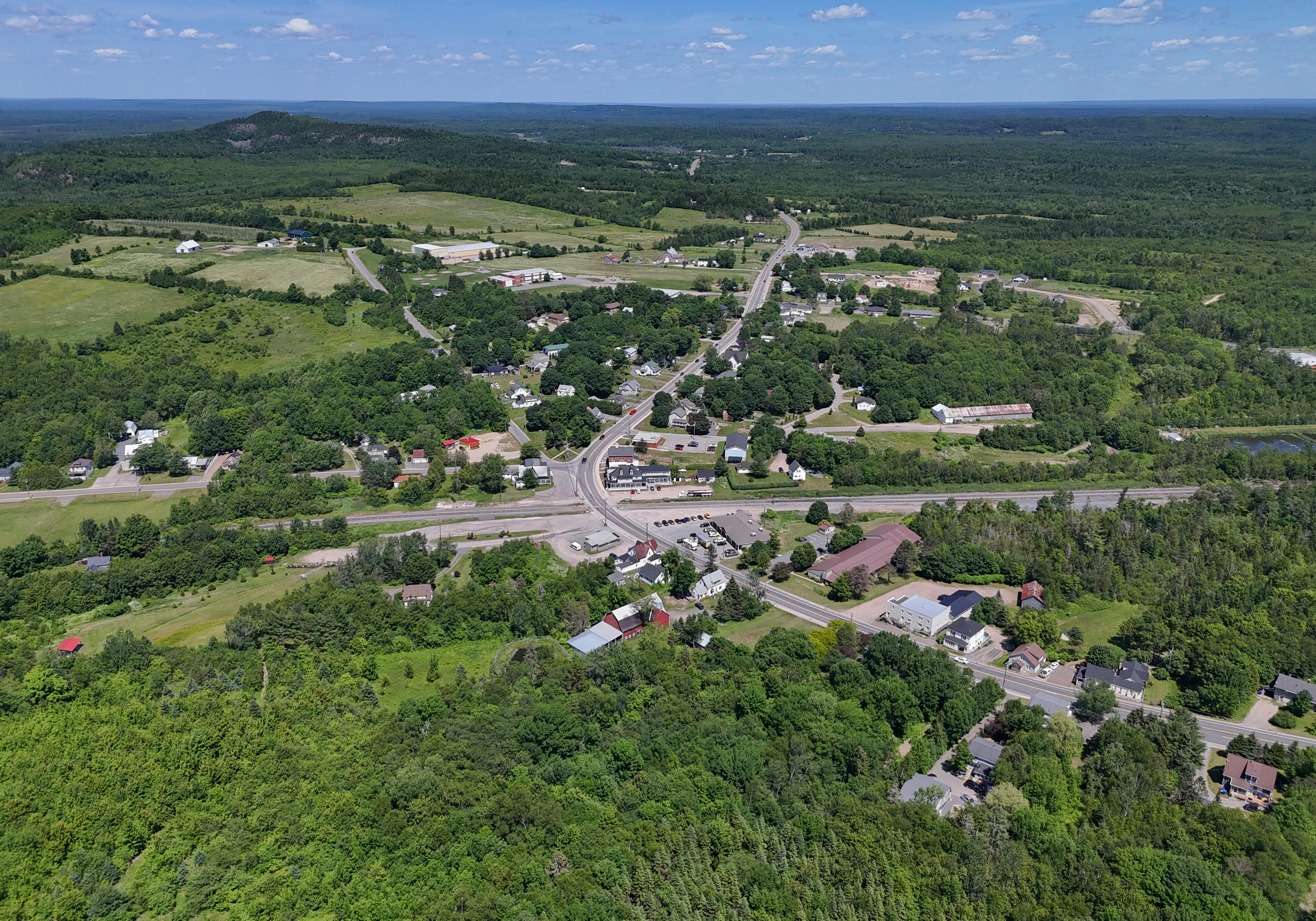
- Harvey Station

- Location of Harvey Station, New Brunswick
- Coordinates: 45°43′45″N 67°00′25″W
- Country: Canada
- Province: New Brunswick
- County: York County
- Parish: Manners Sutton Parish

Government
  - Mayor: Richard H. Corey

Area
  - Land: 2.46 km^{2} (0.95 sq mi)

Population (2021)
  - Total: 402
  - Density: 163.5/km^{2} (423/sq mi)
  - Change (2016–21): ▲12.3%
- Time zone: UTC-4 (Atlantic)
  - Summer (DST): UTC-3 (Atlantic)
- Area code: Area code 506
- Dwellings: 158
- Website: harveyruralcommunity.ca

Harvey is a community in York County, in the Canadian province of New Brunswick, formerly an incorporated village but now part of an incorporated rural community of the same name. It is often called Harvey Station.

Situated at the southeastern end of Harvey Lake, the village is approximately 35 km southwest of Fredericton. The lake was originally known as Bear Lake, then for a time as Big Cranberry Lake, and finally after 1869, as Harvey Lake, when the community that eventually would become Harvey Station was established at the intersection of the "Great Road" and the newly built railway line (see below).

The area south of the village includes the Parish of Manners Sutton, which was the original Harvey Settlement founded in 1837.

On 1 January 2023, Harvey annexed parts of five local service districts and devolved to an incorporated rural community; revised census figures have not been released.

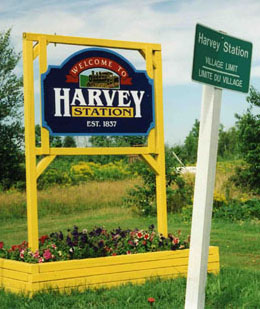
Welcome sign at the northern limit of the Village of Harvey

== History ==
The village traces its name to Harvey Settlement (parish of Manners Sutton). Harvey Station was the name for the railway station that was built at the extreme northern fringe of Harvey Settlement when the European and North American Railway (Western Extension) was constructed in 1869 to connect Saint John with Vanceboro, Maine. Several merchants, hoteliers and other businesses established themselves near Harvey Station, thus moving the settlement's business district.

Harvey Settlement owed its origin to a party of Northumberland and Borders immigrants, recruited for Stanley (a community in York County north of the Saint John River) by the New Brunswick Land Company. Upon their arrival in 1837 they found the Company commissioner absent, and discovered that the Company's inducements had been exaggerated. They appealed to the Legislature and to the Governor, Sir John Harvey, to be permitted to purchase land outside the Company's territory. They were given work on the new St. Andrew's Road and the right to draw lots upon it, in the community that would bear the Governor's name. The party of 154 had arrived at Saint John from Berwick-upon-Tweed aboard the Snow Cornelius of Sunderland, and hailed mostly from northern Northumberland, many being from the town of Wooler or its rural environs commonly known as Glendale.

Some friends and close relatives of the Cornelius settlers of 1837 arrived as chain migrants in the community beginning in 1840 (e.g., Briggs, Swan, Craigs, Moffitt), but the numbers were not large. They primarily came from Northumberland and the Borders with very few arriving from elsewhere in Great Britain. These later arrivals primarily settled on lots in the outer tiers of Harvey settlement.

A major early accessions to Harvey settlement following the arrival of the original Cornelius settlers of 1837 were five Little brothers 1840. They were not part of any Northumberland chain migration though, having migrated to New Brunswick in 1832 from Dumfries, Scotland in the western Borders region, although their grandfather had already emigrated to New Brunswick in 1819. They obtained title in 1842 to a 2,000 acre (8 km^{2}) tract to the west of the community that became known as Little Settlement. They in turn influenced their relatives, the Heughan and Lister families as well as a few others, to migrate from Dumfriesshire to join them.

Several other friends and relatives of the original Cornelius Party chose to emigrate to the community beginning in 1850 when the Capt. John Campbell Block on the southern margin of Harvey Settlement became available for settlement at the price one dollar per acre (e.g. Rutherford, Cleghorn, Wood, Swan). This 1,000 acre (4 km^{2}) block bordering Oromocto Lake became known as Tweedside, named for the Tweed River in the settler's homeland. Other later arrivals, and members of the second settler generation, also obtained lands on the 1,500 acre (6 km^{2}) Simonds and Beauchant tracts that straddled the road between Tweedside and Harvey.

A few other immigrant families also arrived in the community in the 1840s and 1850s independent of each other and previous waves of migrants.

=== Railway ===
In 1852 the New Brunswick government and the European & North American Railway Company signed a contract for the building of a railway to link the province with Nova Scotia and Maine. By 1869 the section between Saint John and Fredericton had been completed and passed through the extreme northern fringe of Harvey Settlement.

The passenger station was built in 1869 and extended in 1909, with the community located near the tracks known as Harvey Station. The E&NA was later absorbed into the New Brunswick Railway which became part of the Canadian Pacific Railway (CPR) in the 1880s. Harvey was placed on the CPR's transcontinental line from Saint John to Montreal and brought growth and prosperity to Harvey Settlement. The village's present-day business district was established near the station when hotels were built to accommodate train passengers, as well as several stores and mills to provide goods to people in the area.

Rail travel eventually went into decline and became supplanted as roadways were improved. By 1962 the Harvey passenger train station was slated for destruction. A portion of the building was rescued from destruction and moved across Harvey Lake on the ice in winter where it is now a cottage in Herbert Cove.

Via Rail's Atlantic was discontinued through the village in 1981; upon the train's revival from 1985 until its second discontinuance in 1994, the train did not stop in Harvey Station.

On January 1, 1995, CPR sold its lines east of Montreal with the line running through Harvey now being operated by the New Brunswick Southern Railway. Only 2 weeks previously on December 17, 1994, Via Rail ran its last passenger train (the Atlantic) through Harvey, after continuous service on the line from Montreal to Saint John from 1889 - 1978 by CPR and from 1978–1981 and since 1985 by Via.

== Culture ==
The biggest event in the region is Harvey Community Days.

== Education ==
Harvey has 2 public schools:

- Harvey Elementary School (K-5)
- Harvey High School (6-12)

== Climate ==
Climate data for Harvey Station (1981−2010)
Month	Jan	Feb	Mar	Apr	May	Jun	Jul	Aug	Sep	Oct	Nov	Dec	Year
Record high °C (°F)	18.5 (65.3)	17.5 (63.5)	18.5 (65.3)	29.5 (85.1)	33.9 (93.0)	32.5 (90.5)	33.5 (92.3)	33.5 (92.3)	30.5 (86.9)	24.5 (76.1)	19.5 (67.1)	16.5 (61.7)	33.9 (93.0)
Mean daily maximum °C (°F)	−5.3 (22.5)	−3.1 (26.4)	1.8 (35.2)	9.2 (48.6)	16.6 (61.9)	21.6 (70.9)	24.3 (75.7)	23.8 (74.8)	18.3 (64.9)	12.1 (53.8)	5.3 (41.5)	−1.8 (28.8)	10.2 (50.4)
Daily mean °C (°F)	−10.2 (13.6)	−7.9 (17.8)	−3.0 (26.6)	4.1 (39.4)	10.6 (51.1)	15.6 (60.1)	18.6 (65.5)	18.1 (64.6)	13.0 (55.4)	7.4 (45.3)	1.4 (34.5)	−6.1 (21.0)	5.1 (41.2)
Mean daily minimum °C (°F)	−15 (5)	−12.6 (9.3)	−7.7 (18.1)	−1.1 (30.0)	4.5 (40.1)	9.6 (49.3)	12.8 (55.0)	12.3 (54.1)	7.7 (45.9)	2.6 (36.7)	−2.4 (27.7)	−10.5 (13.1)	0.0 (32.0)
Record low °C (°F)	−32.5 (−26.5)	−30 (−22)	−32 (−26)	−18 (0)	−4.0 (24.8)	1.0 (33.8)	5.5 (41.9)	0.5 (32.9)	−3.0 (26.6)	−7 (19)	−21 (−6)	−32 (−26)	−32.5 (−26.5)
Average precipitation mm (inches)	105.2 (4.14)	63.7 (2.51)	92.5 (3.64)	98.9 (3.89)	114.5 (4.51)	98.4 (3.87)	105.6 (4.16)	94.4 (3.72)	90.9 (3.58)	101.8 (4.01)	117.3 (4.62)	107.9 (4.25)	1,191.2 (46.90)
Average rainfall mm (inches)	41.3 (1.63)	21.6 (0.85)	44.0 (1.73)	76.6 (3.02)	113.1 (4.45)	98.4 (3.87)	105.6 (4.16)	94.4 (3.72)	90.8 (3.57)	100.4 (3.95)	102.7 (4.04)	57.5 (2.26)	946.4 (37.26)
Average snowfall cm (inches)	63.9 (25.2)	42.1 (16.6)	48.5 (19.1)	22.3 (8.8)	1.4 (0.6)	0.0 (0.0)	0.0 (0.0)	0.0 (0.0)	0.1 (0.0)	1.4 (0.6)	14.6 (5.7)	50.5 (19.9)	244.8 (96.4)
Average precipitation days (≥ 0.2 mm)	15.0	12.4	14.7	15.0	16.0	14.6	13.9	12.4	12.9	14.2	15.2	15.2	171.5
Average rainy days (≥ 0.2 mm)	4.0	2.4	5.2	9.4	13.4	12.1	11.8	10.1	10.0	11.3	11.1	5.5	106.2
Average snowy days (≥ 0.2 cm)	7.5	6.9	6.2	3.1	0.4	0.0	0.0	0.0	0.07	0.27	2.9	7.4	34.7
Source: Environment Canada

== Demographics ==
In the 2021 Census of Population conducted by Statistics Canada, Harvey had a population of 402 living in 171 of its 176 total private dwellings, a change of 12.3% from its 2016 population of 358. With a land area of 2.46 km^{2} (0.95 sq mi), it had a population density of 163.4/km^{2} (423.2/sq mi) in 2021.

Historical populations: Harvey, NB
Year	Pop.	±%
2001	349	—
2006	352	+0.9%
2011	363	+3.1%
2016	358	−1.4%
2021	402	+12.3%

== Notable people ==
Don Messer Don Messer's Jubilee Wendy Louise Nielsen Catharine Pendrel

== See also ==
- List of communities in New Brunswick
