= Brien McMahon High School =

Coordinates: 41°5′8″N 73°26′0″W

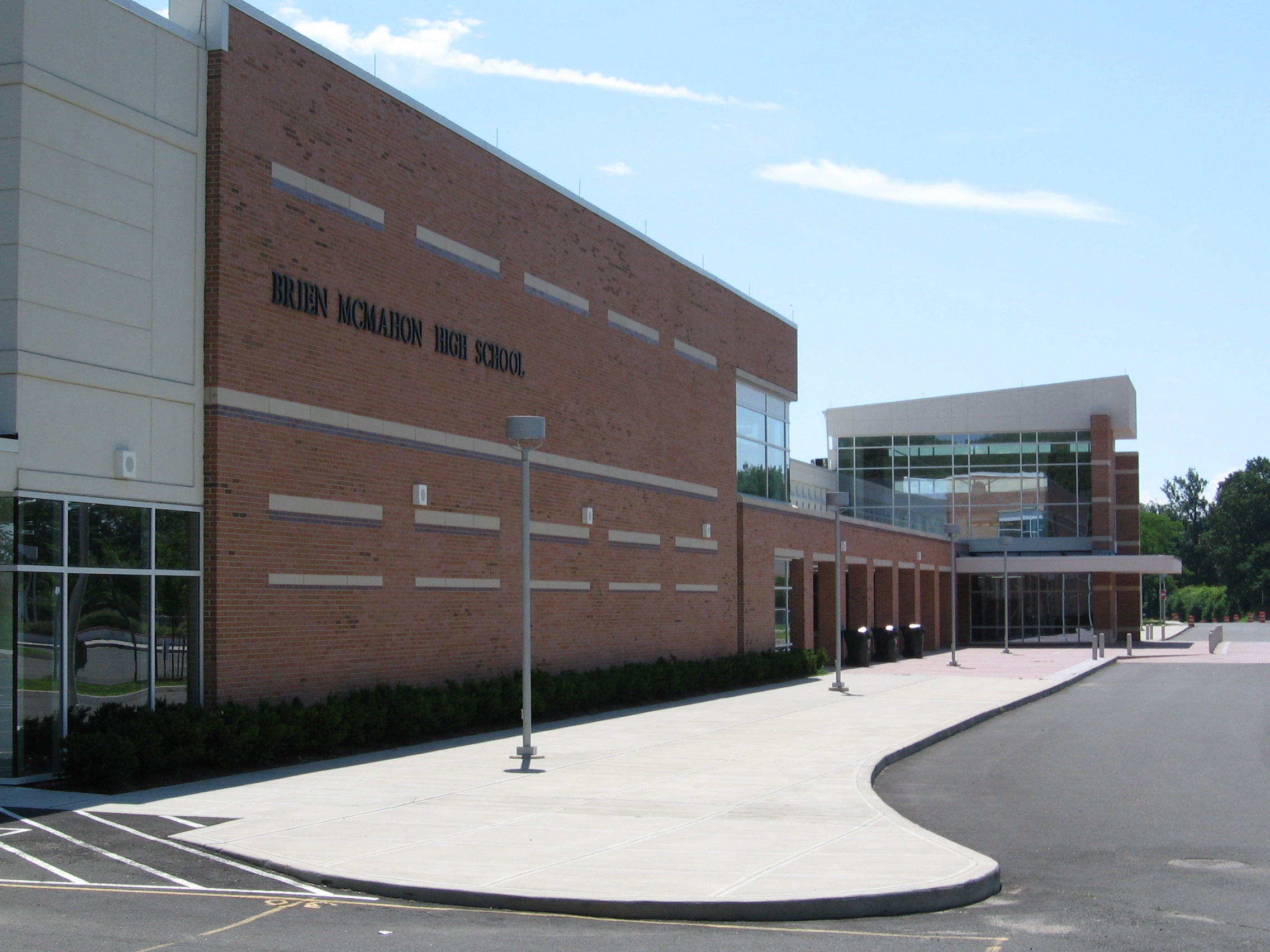

Location
- 300 Highland Avenue; Norwalk, Connecticut 06854; United States

Information
- Type: Public
- Motto: Home of the Senators
- Established: 1960 (66 years ago)
- CEEB code: 070698
- Teaching staff: 115.40 (on an FTE basis)
- Enrollment: 1,766 (2023-2024)
- Student to teacher ratio: 15.30
- Colors: Red, white, blue
- Mascot: Senator
- Website: bmhs.norwalkps.org

Brien McMahon High School (BMHS) is a secondary school located in Norwalk, Connecticut, United States. It is named after Brien McMahon, a former United States Senator from Norwalk. The school's mascot is a Senator and its colors are red, white, and blue. The school's first senior class graduated in 1962.

The Center for Global Studies is a magnet school within Brien McMahon High School. This is a magnet program for students in Fairfield County who want to learn Arabic, Chinese, or Japanese languages, and the respective culture and history. A Middle Eastern Studies program was introduced in the fall of 2006.

The diversity break down of the school is 60% Hispanic, 22% White, 13% Black, 3% Asian, and 2% other.

== History ==
Constructed in 1956, Brien McMahon High School first enrolled students during the 1958–59 school year. The first graduating class was in 1962. In 2006 the school had a major reconstruction.

On September 28, 2010, the school began a garden project to convert its center courtyard into a garden for the entire school to use. Volunteers from Pepperidge Farm, the school's National Honor Society, teachers, and students began the garden, which is used for biology classes, cooking classes, and other classes around the school.

== Athletics ==
The school's crosstown rival is Norwalk High School; they compete in an annual Thanksgiving Day football game. The boys' lacrosse team was the Division 2 state champion in 2000 and Division 1 state runner-up in 2005. The football team was state champion in 1994. The girls' lacrosse team was Division 2 state champion runner-up in 2007. The baseball team was Class LL state champion runner-up in 2009. Brien McMahon is a member of the Fairfield County Interscholastic Athletic Conference (FCIAC). BMHS has multiple co-op teams including boys' ice hockey, which is combined with Norwalk High School, the girls' ice hockey team combined with Norwalk High School and Wilton High School, and the swimming and diving team, which is combined with Norwalk High School. In their 2016 season the girls' volleyball team were FCIAC state runner-ups.

== Notable alumni ==
- Sarah Andersen, cartoonist and illustrator, and the author of the webcomic Sarah's Scribbles
- Jesse Bradford, actor and former McMahon homecoming king
- Mitch Longley, TV, stage and screen actor, founder of the non-profit organization SOWOHO
- John Mayer, musician
- Kevin Morton, former MLB player for the Boston Red Sox
- Idris Price, former NFL player for the Tampa Bay Buccaneers
- Travis Simms, pro boxer in the super welterweight division, former champion
- Daniel Walsh, winner of a bronze medal in rowing at the 2008 Summer Olympics
- Joan Wasser, indie rock musician
- Rita Williams, former professional basketball player in the Women's National Basketball Association (WNBA)
- Peyton McNamara, Soccer player, member of the Jamaican Women's National Team
