= West Quoddy Lifesaving Station =

- U.S. National Register of Historic Places
- U.S. Historic district
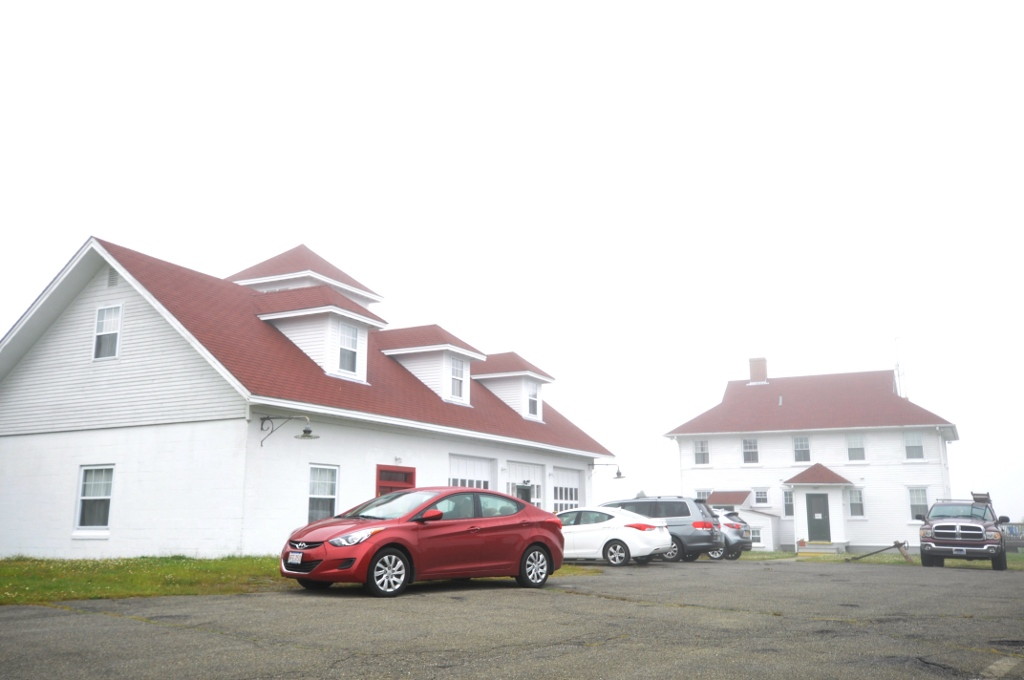

- Location within Maine Location within the United States
- Nearest city: Lubec, Maine
- Coordinates: 44°49′4″N 66°57′59″W
- Area: 5.1 acres (2.1 ha)
- Built: 1919
- Architect: Mendleheff, Victor
- Architectural style: Colonial Revival
- MPS: Lifesaving Stations of Maine MPS
- NRHP reference No.: 90000581
- Added to NRHP: April 20, 1990

West Quoddy Lifesaving Station is a historic coastal rescue station on West Quoddy Head in Lubec, Maine. The lifesaving station was built in 1919, and was operated by the United States Coast Guard until 1972. It was listed on the National Register of Historic Places on April 20, 1990. It now houses a bed and breakfast inn.

== Description and history ==
West Quoddy Head is an easterly-pointing peninsula in southeastern Lubec, overlooking Quoddy Narrows, a strait between Lubec and Campobello Island, Canada, that provides access to Passamaquoddy Bay and harbors located on the St. Croix River and other rivers which the empty into the bay. Most of the peninsula is part of Quoddy Head State Park, and the former lifesaving station is located on 5 acres (2.0 ha) on the north side of the peninsula.

The station consists of four buildings, three of which are located on a rise above the shore. The main building is a dwelling house, 2-1/2 stories in height, with a gabled roof and clapboard siding. Nearby are a garage and a utility building. The largest building of the complex is the boathouse, which is located at the shore. It has three bays providing access to the boat storage inside, with two of the bays now having leveled floors installed over the original sloping floors. The slip for launching the boats extends more than 100 feet (30 m) (a consequence of the area's extremely high tides), and includes a (now deteriorating) track system to facilitate launch and retrieval of vessels.

The first lifesaving station in the area was established by the United States Life-Saving Service (a predecessor to the Coast Guard) in 1874, and was one of five such stations in Maine. It was located at Carrying Point Cove on the south side of West Quoddy Head, a relatively exposed location. The present facility was built by the Coast Guard in 1919 to replace that one, and was in active service until 1972. Since then, it has been used as a boat-building school, biological research station, and bed and breakfast inn.

== See also ==
- National Register of Historic Places listings in Washington County, Maine
