= Campobello Parish =

Coordinates: 44.877768°N 66.943817°W

Campobello
- Parish
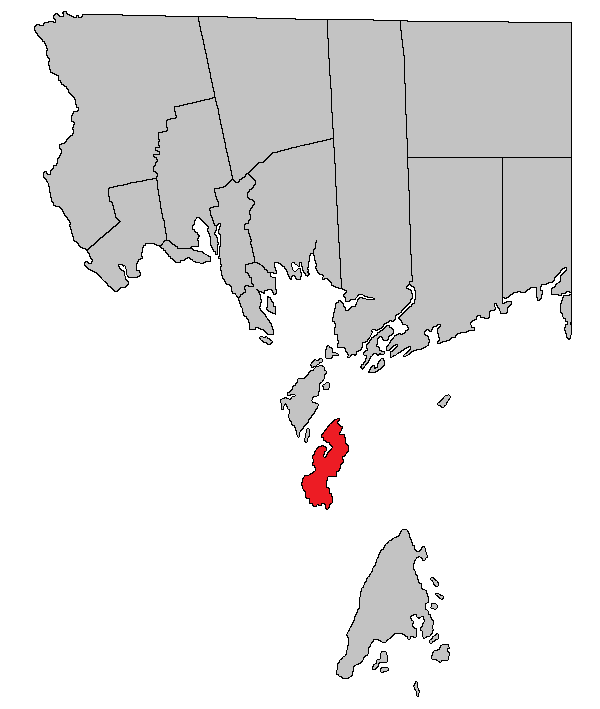
- Location within Charlotte County.
- Country: Canada
- Province: New Brunswick
- County: Charlotte County
- Established: 1803

Area
  - Land: 39.67 km^{2} (15.32 sq mi)

Population (2016)
  - Total: 872
  - Density: 22/km^{2} (57/sq mi)
  - Pop 2011-2016: ▼5.7%
  - Dwellings: 616
- Time zone: UTC-4 (AST)
  - Summer (DST): UTC-3 (ADT)

Campobello is a Canadian parish including one main island and several small islands and islets in Charlotte County, New Brunswick.

== History ==
Campobello Parish was established in 1803 from West Isles Parish. The entire parish was incorporated as the rural community of Campobello Island in 2010.

=== Campobello Parish ===
In 1803, Campobello Island "with its appurtenances" was separated from West Isles Parish to establish Campo-Bello Parish. The boundary description was clarified in 1877 as "[b]eing the Island so named, and other Islands to the south and east of Head Harbour passage, but west of Grand Manan."

The name appeared in government acts as Campo Bello in 1850, 1854, 1877, and 1896, finally appearing as Campobello in 1903.

The local service district of the parish of Campobello was established in 1969 to assess for community services, in this case to contract with an independent agency in Lubec, Maine, to provide ambulance conveyance from Campobello to St. Stephen Hospital. Fire protection was added later in 1969 first aid & ambulance services in 1984, and recreational facilities in 1998.

The entire parish was incorporated as the Rural Community of Campobello Island in November 2010 and the LSD dissolved. The geographic parish continues to exist.

== Delineation ==
Campobello Parish is defined in the Territorial Division Act as:

"Being the island so named, and other islands to the south and east of Head Harbour Passage, but west of Grand Manan."

== Communities ==
Parish population total does not include incorporated municipalities (in bold).

- North Road
- Otter Cove
- Welshpool
- Wilsons Beach

== Bodies of water & Islands ==
This is a list of rivers, lakes, streams, creeks, marshes and Islands that are at least partially in this parish

- Campobello Island
- Head Harbour Island

== Demographics ==
=== Population ===
Canada census – Campobello Parish community profile

| | 2016 | 2011 |
| Population | 872 (-5.7% from 2011) | 925 (-12.4% from 2006) |
| Land area | 39.67 km^{2} (15.32 sq mi) | 39.67 km^{2} (15.32 sq mi) |
| Population density | 22.0/km^{2} (57/sq mi) | 23.3/km^{2} (60/sq mi) |
| Median age | 48.4 (M: 48.2, F: 48.4) | 46.0 (M: 46.1, F: 45.9) |
| Private dwellings | 616 (total) | 641 (total) |
| Median household income | $52,139 |

References: 2016 2011

Historical Census Data
Campobello Parish, NB

| Year | Pop. | ±% |
|---|---|---|
| 1991 | 1,317 | — |
| 1996 | 1,305 | −0.9% |

| Year | Pop. | ±% |
|---|---|---|
| 2001 | 1,195 | −8.4% |
| 2006 | 1,056 | −11.6% |

| Year | Pop. | ±% |
|---|---|---|
| 2011 | 925 | −12.4% |
| 2016 | 872 | −5.7% |

=== Language ===
Canada Census Mother Tongue - Campobello Parish, New Brunswick
| Census | Total | English | | | French | | | English & French | | | Other | | |
| Year | Responses | Count | Trend | Pop % | Count | Trend | Pop % | Count | Trend | Pop % | Count | Trend | Pop % |
| 2011 | 895 | 885 | ▼10.2% | 98.88% | 5 | ▼83.3% | 0.56% | 0 | 0.0% | 0.00% | 5 | ▼75.0% | 0.56% |
| 2006 | 1,035 | 985 | ▼15.4% | 95.17% | 30 | ▲ n/a% | 2.90% | 0 | 0.0% | 0.00% | 20 | ▲ n/a% | 1.93% |
| 2001 | 1,165 | 1,165 | ▼9.0% | 100.00% | 0 | 0.0% | 0.00% | 0 | 0.0% | 0.00% | 0 | 0.0% | 0.00% |
| 1996 | 1,280 | 1,280 | n/a | 100.00% | 0 | n/a | 0.00% | 0 | n/a | 0.00% | 0 | n/a | 0.00% |

== Access Routes ==
Highways and numbered routes that run through the parish, including external routes that start or finish at the parish limits:

- **Highways**
  - None
- **Principal Routes**
  - None
- Secondary Routes:
  - Route 774
- External Routes:
  - Cummings Cove to Welshpool Ferry
  - Franklin Delano Roosevelt Bridge
  - North Road

== See also ==
- List of parishes in New Brunswick
