= David Owen (judge) =

Canadian politician

David Owen (1754 – December 10, 1829) was a judge, land owner and political figure in New Brunswick, Canada. He represented Charlotte County in the Legislative Assembly of New Brunswick from 1796 to 1802.

== Early life ==
He was born in Wales, the son of Owen Owen and Anne Davies. He studied at Trinity College, Cambridge, where he was Senior Wrangler in 1777 and received his M.A. degree in 1780. He was ordained a deacon for the Church of England in 1778, served as a chaplain in the Royal Navy and was ordained to the priesthood in 1787. In 1767, with his uncle William Owen and his two brothers, Owen had been granted land on Passamaquoddy Outer Island (renamed Campobello Island in 1770).

In 1787, some time after the death of his uncle, Owen came to the island to manage the family's interests.

== Law career ==
Described as "bookish" and "thin-skinned", Owen was known for "waging constant legal battles", with Warren Hathaway as his ally - even as Warren's younger brother Charles Hathaway proved a recurring rival to Owen.

He was named justice of the peace and a judge for the Court of General Sessions and the Inferior Court of Common Pleas. Owen lobbied unsuccessfully to have Campobello Island and several nearby islands declared a separate county from Charlotte.

Owen, who served as a justice of the peace, wrote to judge Edward Winslow in 1802, noting his concern that "the influx of strangers...on Deer Island they have actually defied the proprietor Capt. Farrell and built habitations. On one or two islands are houses erected by these aliens...[we may] prevent their smuggling to our great injury".

He died on Campobello Island in 1829 and was buried in the family vault in Wales.
