= William Owen (Royal Navy officer, born 1737) =

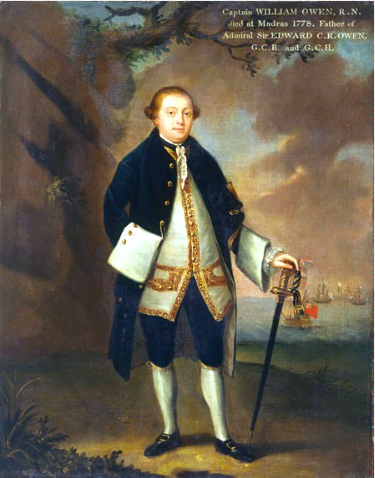
- Born: 1737
- Died: 24 October 1778 (aged 40–41); Madras, India
- Children: Sir Edward Owen; William Owen
- Military career
- Allegiance: Great Britain
- Branch: Royal Navy
- Service years: c.1758–1778
- Rank: Commander
- Commands: HMS Cormorant
- Conflicts: Seven Years' War; Battle of Cuddalore; Battle of Negapatam; American Revolutionary War; Battle of Pondicherry

Commander William Owen (1737 – 24 October 1778) was a Welsh naval officer. Born in Glan Severn, Montgomeryshire, Wales, of a family of gentry, he was youngest son of David Owen of Cefn Hafod, Montgomeryshire.

He was a member of the Royal Navy and lost his right arm from a wound suffered during the Seven Years' War off Pondicherry when supporting the British East India Company forces in 1760. Not content with the half pension he was receiving, he served as an impress officer. After the war, Owen contacted a former fellow officer, Lord William Campbell, who had recently been appointed governor of Nova Scotia. Late in 1766, Owen travelled with Campbell to Halifax. The following year, as payment for his work in aid of Campbell, he was awarded a large parcel of land. The grant, which included three of his nephews as grantees, was Passamaquoddy Outer Island in Passamaquoddy Bay. In 1770, Owen renamed the island Campobello Island after Lord Campbell; he also took into account the Italian meaning, "fair field", of the new name.

In the 1770s, Owen wrote a volume of 'Narratives' which was subsequently published in 1942 and which covers the creation of Campobello in Canada. He also wrote that "I could have taken it, Eastport, with a gun brig and my own militia. I am in possession of all except Moose Island".

In England, Owen spent some time in Shrewsbury, where he was sworn a freeman of borough on 5 October 1764, and, by then a captain in the navy, served as Mayor in 1775–76, following which he returned to service in India. Owen was killed, accidentally, in Madras, India while carrying dispatches from India to England.

Owen left on his death two surviving natural sons via Sarah Haslam (latter named Sarah Bagshaw). His eldest son was Edward William Campbell Rich Owen and his younger son was William Fitzwilliam Owen. The latter became sole owner of Campobello Island in 1835 and settled there.
