= Edward Owen (Royal Navy officer) =

Royal Navy Admiral (1771–1849)

Admiral Sir Edward Owen GCB GCH
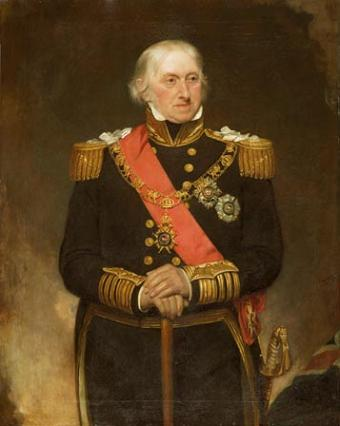
- Admiral Sir Edward Owen
- Born: 1771; Campobello, Nova Scotia
- Died: 8 October 1849 (aged 77–78); Windlesham House, near Bagshot, Surrey, England
- Military career
- Allegiance: United Kingdom
- Branch: Royal Navy
- Rank: Admiral
- Commands: HMS Nemesis; HMS Immortalité; HMS Clyde; HMS Inconstant; HMS Cormwall; HMS Dorset; HMS Royal Sovereign; West Indies Station; East Indies Station; Mediterranean Fleet
- Conflicts: Napoleonic Wars
- Awards: Knight Grand Cross of the Order of the Bath; Knight Grand Cross of the Royal Guelphic Order

Admiral Sir Edward William Campbell Rich Owen GCB GCH (1771 – 8 October 1849) was a Royal Navy officer who went on to be Commander-in-Chief, Mediterranean Fleet. He was the son of Captain William Owen and elder brother of Vice-Admiral William Fitzwilliam Owen.

== Naval career ==
Owen joined the Royal Navy in 1786 under the patronage of his godfather Sir Thomas Rich. He served on several ships around the world. After being promoted to lieutenant in November 1793, he joined Hannibal and thereafter served with the blockading fleet off Cádiz. His loyalty during the Mutiny at the Nore in 1797 made him a captain in 1798.

He was given command, successively, of HMS Nemesis, the captured French frigate HMS Immortalité (1802) and HMS Clyde in March 1806. In 1809 he took part in the unsuccessful Walcheren Campaign in 1809.

Later he commanded HMS Inconstant, HMS Cornwall and HMS Dorset. In 1811 he was active in the Gulf of Mexico, in 1813 he served in the North Sea and in 1814 on the Great Lakes. On his return (1816) he got the command of HMS Royal Sovereign and was knighted that year.

He became Commander-in-Chief, West Indies in 1823 and, following promotion to rear admiral in 1825, he was appointed Surveyor-General of the Ordnance in 1827, made a member of the Lord High Admiral's Council in 1828 and was made Commander-in-Chief, East Indies Station in 1829. In this capacity he had to contend with pirates and considered the use of steam ships to pursue them. Promoted to vice admiral in 1837, he was appointed Commander-in-Chief, Mediterranean Fleet on HMS Queen in 1841. In 1845 he had command of the Experimental Squadron. In 1846 he was promoted to admiral.

He also served as Member of Parliament for Sandwich from 1826 until 1829, when he resigned from Parliament by taking the Chiltern Hundreds.

Owen Sound in Georgian Bay was named after him by his younger brother.

== See also ==
- O'Byrne, William Richard (1849). "Owen, Edward William Campbell Rich" . A Naval Biographical Dictionary . John Murray – via Wikisource.

== Sources ==
- Cundall, Frank (1915). Historic Jamaica. West India Committee.

Parliament of the United Kingdom
| Preceded by Henry Bonham; Sir George Warrender | Member of Parliament for Sandwich; 1826–1829; With: Joseph Marryatt | Succeeded by Joseph Marryatt; Henry Fane |
Military offices
| Preceded by Sir Charles Rowley | Commander-in-Chief, West Indies; 1823 | Succeeded by Lawrence Halsted |
| Preceded by The Lord Downes | Surveyor-General of the Ordnance; 1827–1828 | Succeeded by Sir Herbert Taylor |
| Preceded by William Hall Gage | Commander-in-Chief, East Indies Station; 1829–1832 | Succeeded by John Gore (As Commander-in-Chief, East Indies and China Station) |
| Preceded by Sir Andrew Leith Hay | Clerk of the Ordnance; 1834–1835 | Succeeded by Sir Andrew Leith Hay |
| Preceded by Sir Robert Stopford | Commander-in-Chief, Mediterranean Fleet; 1841–1845 | Succeeded by Sir William Parker |
