= Head Harbour Lighthouse =

Lighthouse in New Brunswick, Canada

Head Harbour Light Station
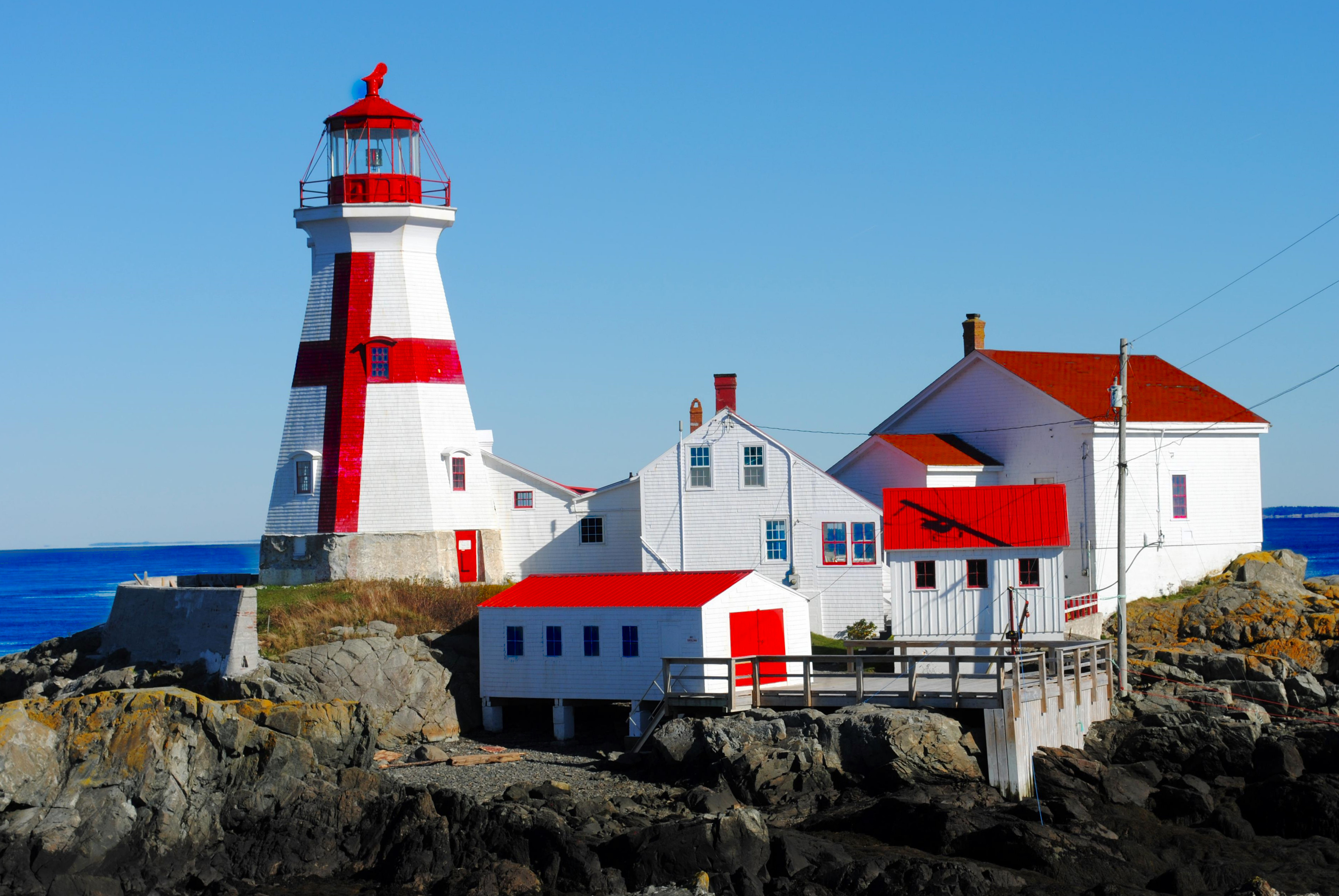
- Head Harbour Light Station in 2012
- Location: Campobello Island, Canada
- Coordinates: 44°57′29″N 66°54′00″W

Tower
- Constructed: 1829
- Construction: lumber, masonry (foundation), lumber (tower)
- Automated: 1986
- Height: 15.5 m (51 ft)
- Shape: octagon
- Markings: White (tower), red (lantern), Cross (red)
- Heritage: provincial heritage place

Light
- Focal height: 17.5 m (57 ft)
- Range: 13 nmi (24 km; 15 mi)
- Characteristic: F R

Head Harbour Lighthouse, also known as East Quoddy Head Light (mostly by Americans to differentiate the Canadian beacon from its American counterpart, West Quoddy Head Light) is a lighthouse and station on Campobello Island, New Brunswick. Erected in 1829 by the provincial government, its purpose was to aid navigation for ships in the Bay of Fundy. While West Quoddy Light stands at the mouth of the narrows around Lubec, Maine, East Quoddy was built on the north side of Campobello, on a small tidal islet connected to the primary landmass, guiding entry into Passamaquoddy Bay. Today, the light and its accessory structures are a historically designated heritage site, supported by an independent preservation group.

== Description ==
The lighthouse is a 51-foot (16 m) octagonal tower of heavy timber; the structure is painted a highly visible white and marked with a large red St. George's Cross which has been a landmark dating back to the Canadian Confederation. The House of Assembly of New Brunswick approved funding for a lighthouse on Campobello Island in 1829, and construction of the main lighthouse was undertaken that same year. As of 1842, Thomas Wyer was one of three commissioners of the lighthouses on Machias Seal Island, Campobello and at Saint Andrews.

The other buildings at the light station, including a keeper's residence built in 1840, a fog alarm building built during World War I, a workshed completed by 1915, and a boathouse built in 1947, are similarly painted white with roofs and doors in a bright red.

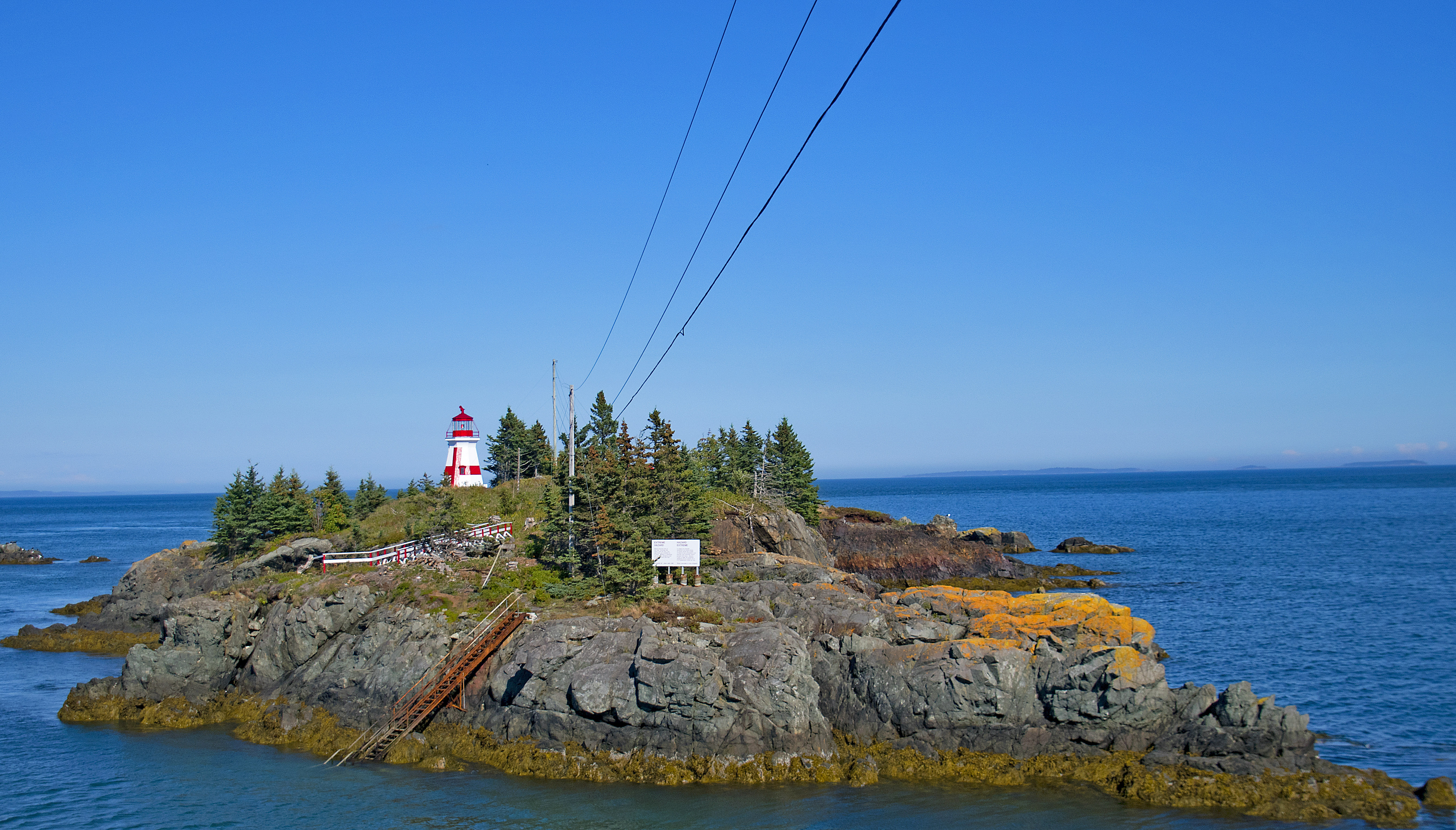
The rocky outcropping on which the lighthouse stands is cut off from Campobello Island during high tide.

The station is situated on a small islet, accessible by land for only two hours during low tide; visitors can become stranded by the incoming tide which rapidly rises at a rate of five feet per hour. Roads and ferries connect mainland Canada to Campobello Island, but the final path to the lighthouse can only be traversed on foot. The footpath includes a wooden bridge, metal ladders, and slick rocks. During the summer months, the Friends of the Head Harbour Lightstation preservation group offer paid tours of the lighthouse. A third-order Fresnel lens, installed in 1887, is located in the lantern room.

== History ==
The United States completed the construction of West Quoddy Head Light, situated near the Canadian border at the easternmost point in the United States, in 1808. While the American light aided sailors in the southern region of the "famously foggy" Bay of Fundy, a new light station on Campobello Island was built with the intention of aiding ships in the Passamaquoddy Bay, north of the Maine–New Brunswick border.

In February 1829, the provincial government of New Brunswick appropriated £400 (equivalent to $37,968 in 2025) to erect a lighthouse on Campobello ("Campo Bello") Island. Head Harbour Light Station was completed later that same year. The first keeper was John Snell, who served from 1829 to 1847, when he was replaced by his son, William Snell. William's daughter, Mary Snell, grew up on the light station, and later wrote about her and her family's life at Campobello.

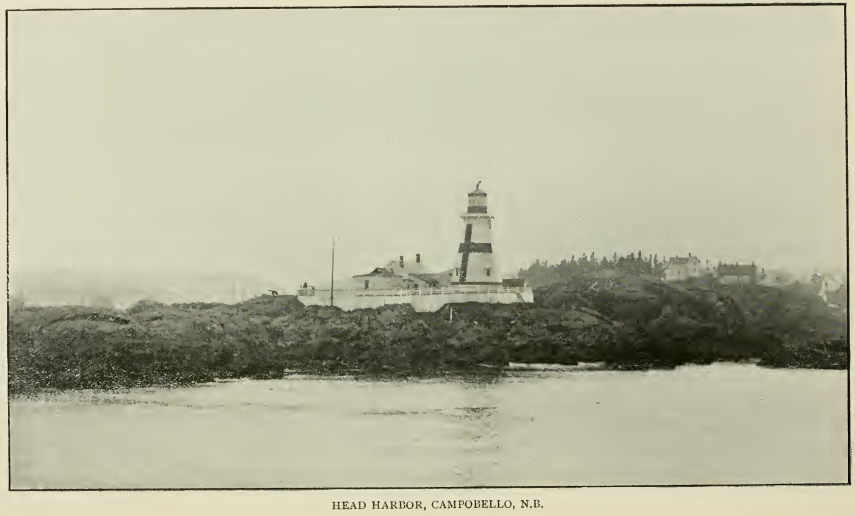
1893 photo of Head Harbour Lighthouse.

The lantern room was altered in 1842 to enable the installation of a "new and much superior" beacon. This year also saw the initial painting of the tower's iconic red cross. A fog horn was added in 1880 that was used in conjunction with a machine-operated bell. The first modern Fresnel lens was installed in 1887. The extant diaphone fog signal and fog horn building were installed during the First World War, in 1915.

The Canadian Coast Guard manned the station until 1986, when it was automated. The "Friends of The Head Harbour Lightstation" organization was established in 2000 to renovate, repair, and manage the station as a historical and tourism site. The property was deeded to the group in 2002, and full control of the light station was transferred in 2006.
