= West Quoddy Head Light =

Lighthouse in Maine, United States

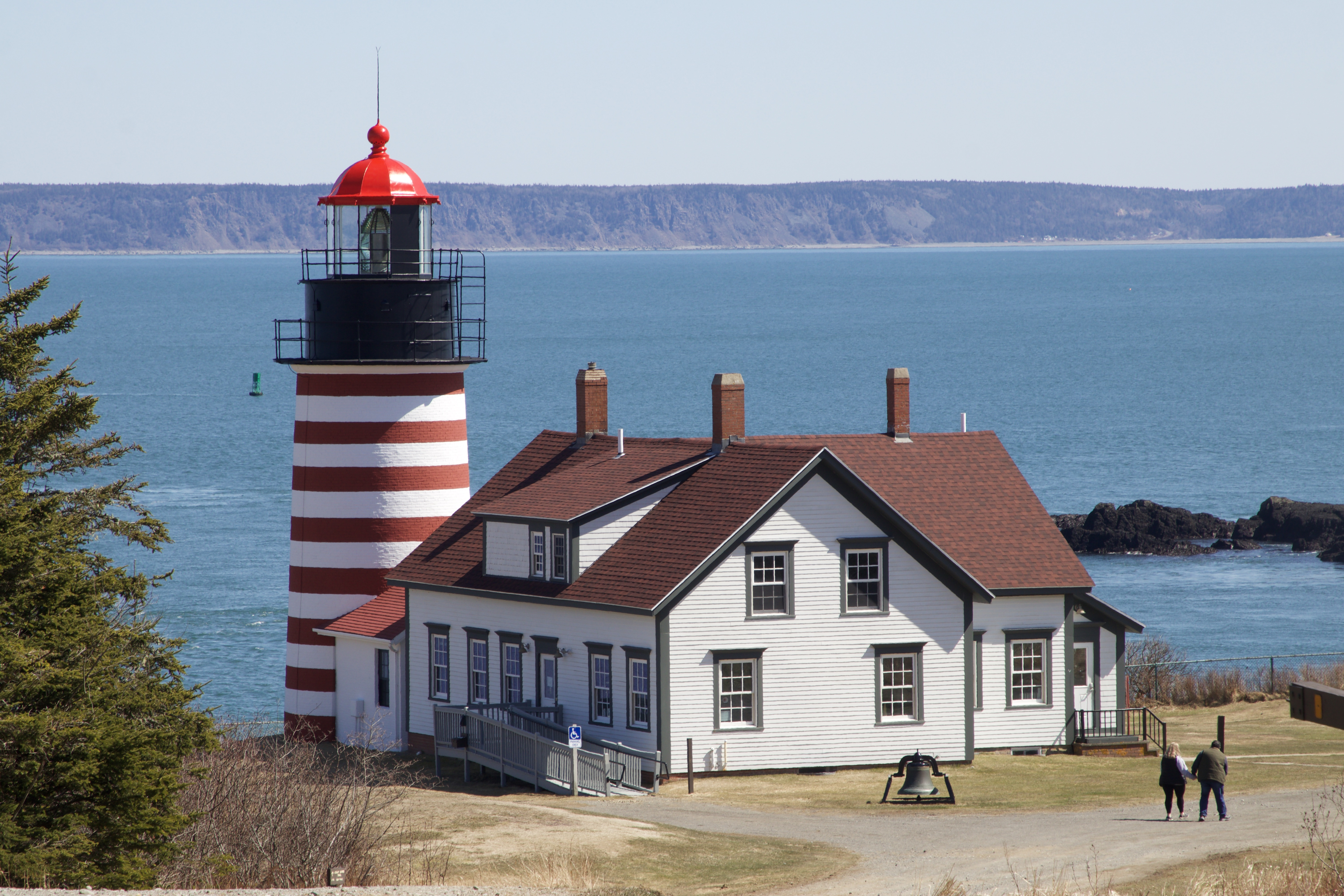
- West Quoddy Head Light, with Grand Manan in the background
- Location: West Quoddy head/Bay of Fundy
- Coordinates: 44°48′54″N 66°57′02″W

Tower
- Constructed: 1808
- Foundation: Masonry
- Construction: Brick
- Automated: 1988
- Height: 49 ft (15 m)
- Shape: Conical
- Markings: Red and white bands with black lantern
- Heritage: National Register of Historic Places listed place
- Fog signal: HORN: 2 every 30s

Light
- First lit: 1858 (Current tower)
- Focal height: 83 ft (25 m)
- Lens: Third order Fresnel lens
- Intensity: 35,000 candela
- Range: 18 nmi (33 km; 21 mi)
- Characteristic: Flashing(2) White 15s
- West Quoddy Head Light Station
- U.S. National Register of Historic Places
- Nearest city: Lubec, Maine
- Built: 1808
- NRHP reference No.: 80004601
- Added to NRHP: July 4, 1980

West Quoddy Head, in Quoddy Head State Park, Lubec, Maine, is the easternmost point of the contiguous United States. In 1808 a lighthouse was constructed at the site to guide ships through the Quoddy Narrows. The current tower, with distinctive red-and-white stripes, was constructed in 1858 and is an active aid to navigation. The 3rd order Fresnel lens is the only 3rd order and one of only eight Fresnel lenses still in use on the Maine Coast.

The light station was added to the National Register of Historic Places as West Quoddy Head Light Station on July 4, 1980.

== Description ==
West Quoddy Head is an easterly-pointing peninsula in southeastern Lubec, overlooking Quoddy Narrows, a strait between Lubec and Campobello Island, Canada, that provides access to Passamaquoddy Bay and harbors located on the St. Croix River and other rivers which empty into the bay. Most of the peninsula is part of Quoddy Head State Park, and the light station is located near the southern end of its eastern face.

A stone sign describes the lighthouse as the "easternmost point in the U.S.A." It is the easternmost building in the United States (a nearby sign proclaims the "easternmost giftshop in the U.S."), but the easternmost point is at rocks extending eastward from the shore. The present light station includes a tower, former keeper's quarters, service building, and oil house. The tower is circular, and is 49 feet (15 m) in height, with the beacon at 83 feet (25 m) above sea level. The light, magnified by a third-order Fresnel lens, has a range of 18 miles (29 km). The tower is built of brick, and painted in alternating horizontal red and white stripes. A small gabled entry vestibule, also brick, projects from the tower. The keeper's house is a wood-frame structure, 1 1/2 stories in height.

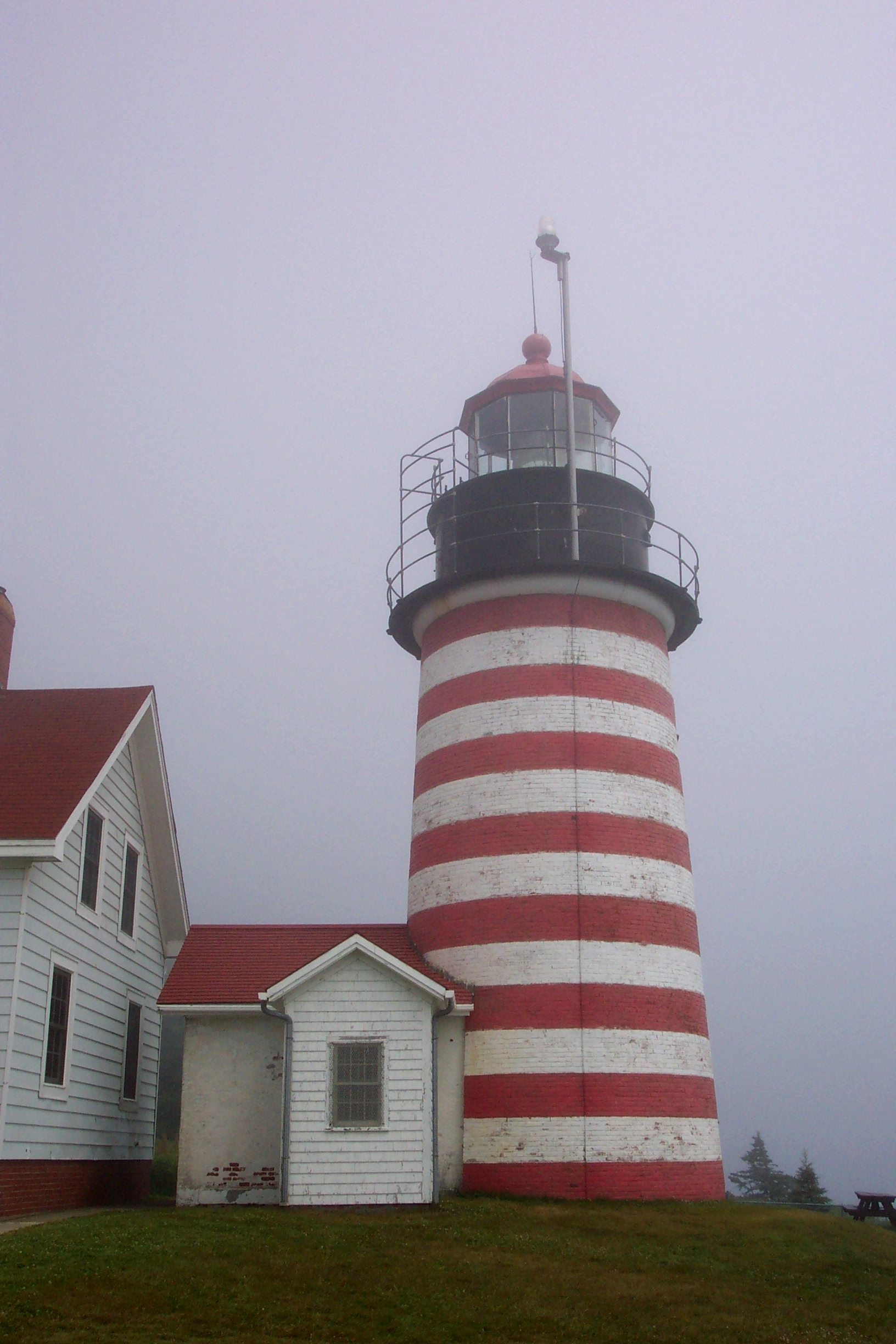

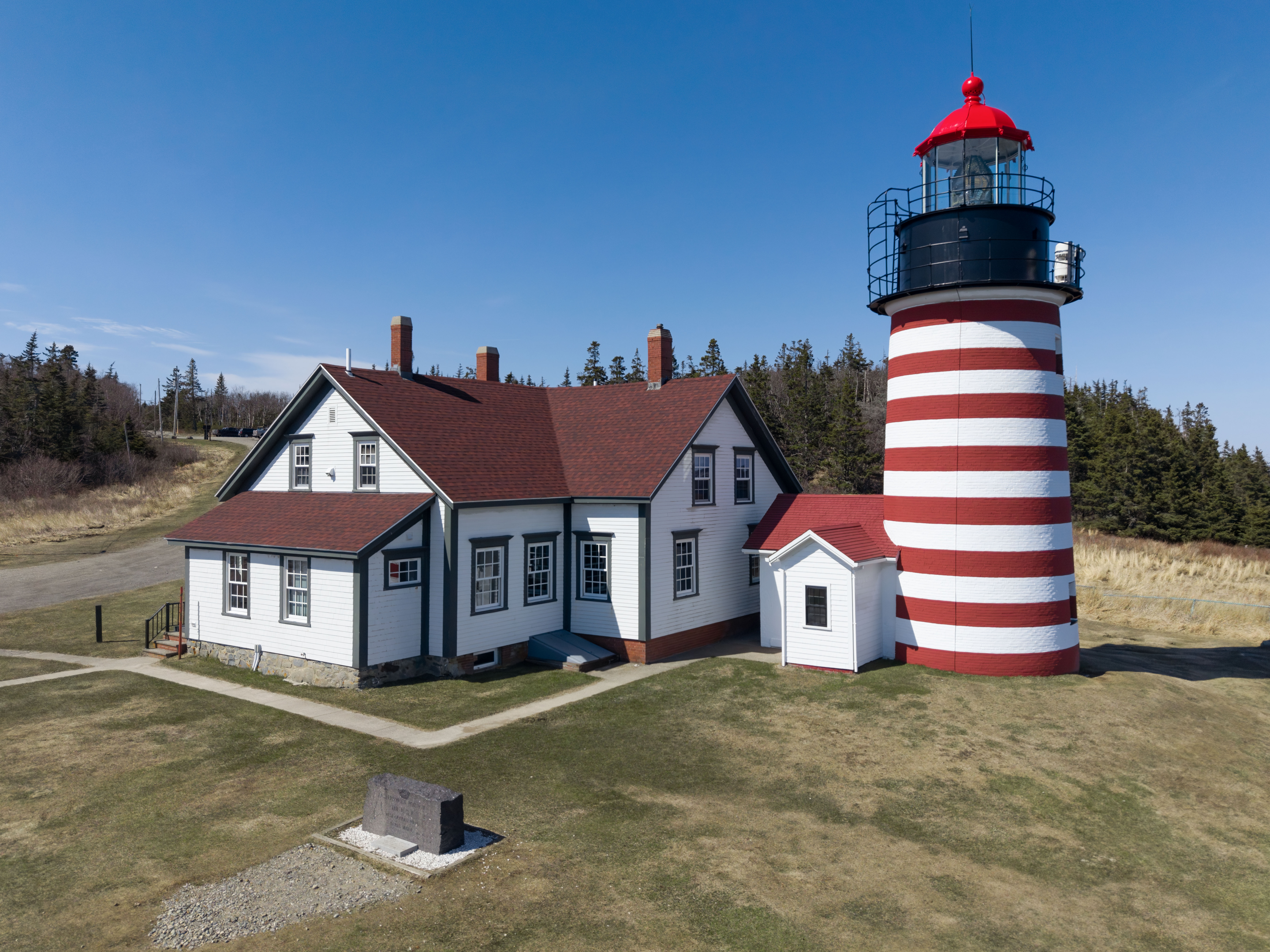

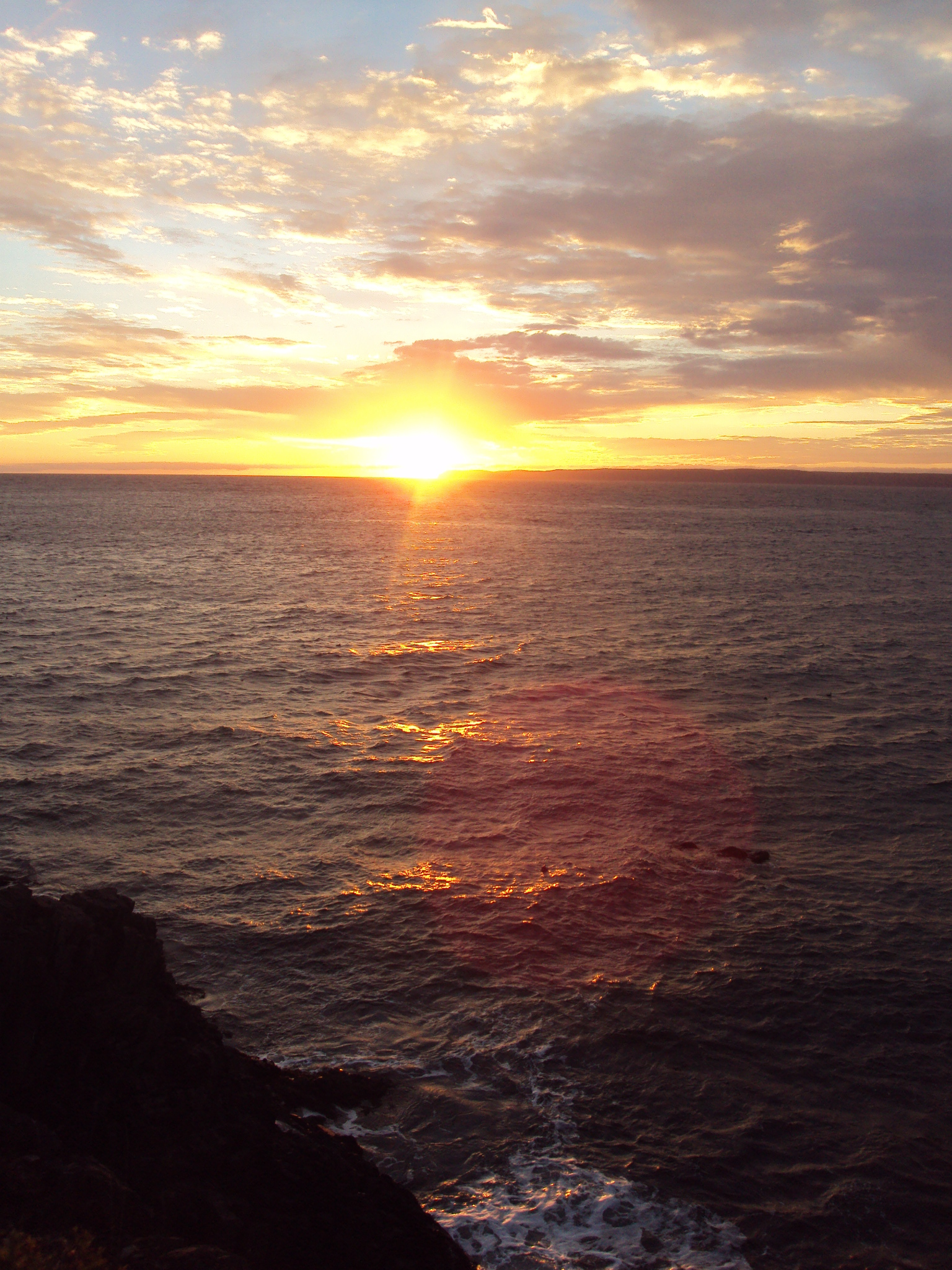

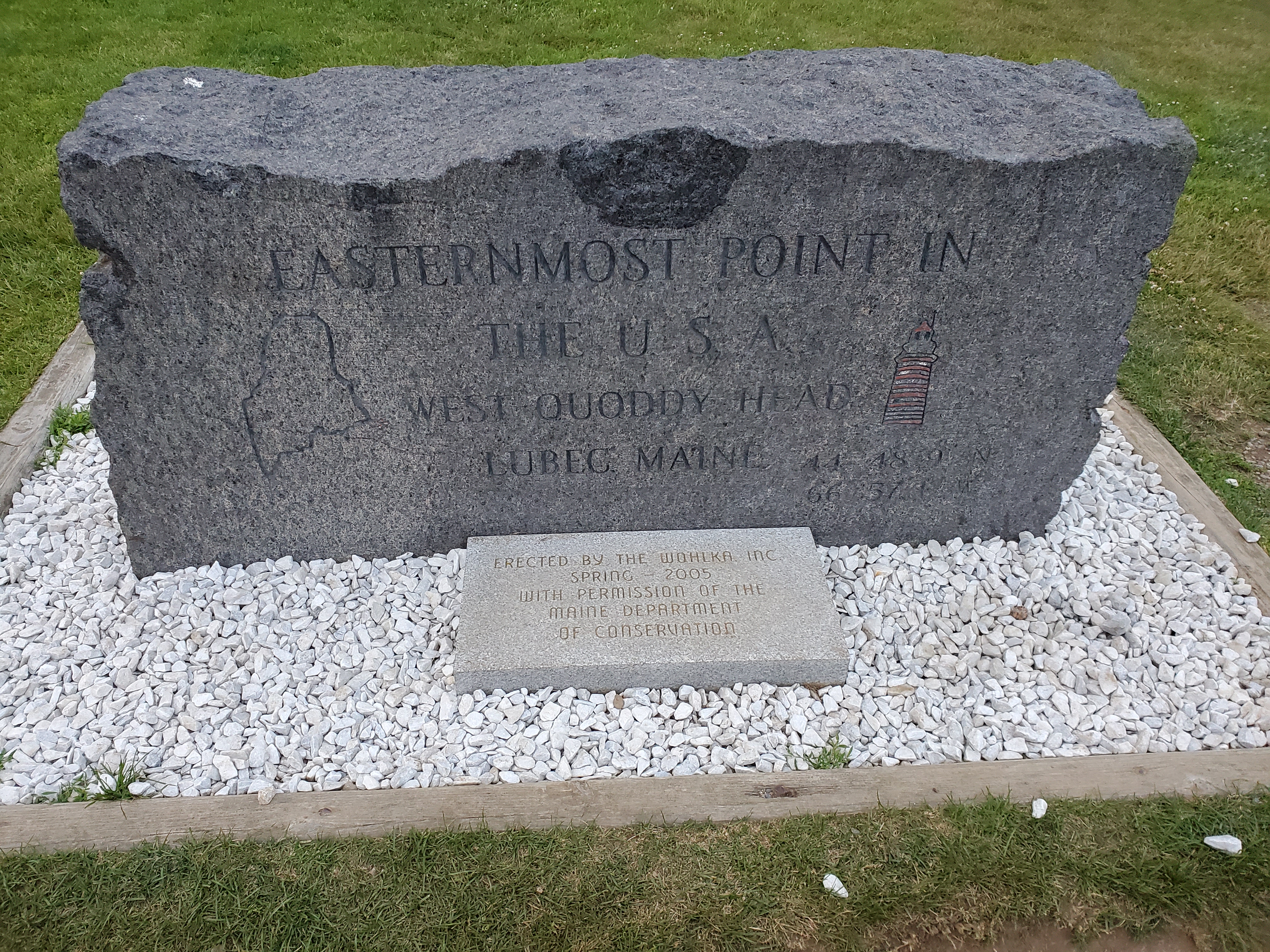

== History ==
A lighthouse at West Quoddy Head, Maine, was authorized by Congress in 1806. The light station was finished on April 21, 1808, at a cost of $5,000 (equivalent to $101,000 in 2025). In 1820, Congress authorized the station's first fog signal, a 500-pound (230 kg) bell, costing $1,000 (equivalent to $23,000 in 2025). The current tower was built in 1858. The present station was built in 1858. The former keeper's house now serves as a museum and visitor center. In 1990, the U.S. Postal Service issued a 25-cent stamp featuring the West Quoddy Head Light.

== Keepers ==
- The first keeper was Thomas Dexter.
- 1939: Howard Grey was the last civilian keeper of the station prior to its transfer to the U.S. Coast Guard.
- 1962: As of August 15, 1962, BM1 Bruce Keene was OIC, or Officer-in-Charge (dates of the time he began and ended his tour are not known— he served at least through September 1964.) According to documents in the West Quoddy file, his father, LT Thomas Keene, had previously served as the head keeper of the light station.
- 1963: As of October 27, Keene was still OIC and (Engineman?) Richard Copeland was his assistant.
- 1978: Through May 31 the OIC was BM1 Cliffton Scholfield. He had a crew of two assistants: MK3 Kenneth Fisher (February–July 1977), MT2 Carl Hatch and FN David Blanding.
- 1978: On June 1, BM2 George Eaton took over as the OIC of the station. He had two assistants.
- 1979: MK3 Carl Hatch was a member of the crew.
- 1981: As of September 14, the OIC was BM1 John Richardson.
- 1988: The last OIC (keeper) was Malcolm Rouse, USCG.

== Popular culture ==
Hazel Marion Eaton was born in 1895 in the lighthouse tower; her father, Edwin L. Eaton, was the assistant light keeper.

In 2026, soccer team Portland Hearts of Pine unveiled a new kit inspired by the lighthouse, named the Lighthouse Kit.

== See also ==
- National Register of Historic Places listings in Washington County, Maine
- Head Harbour Lighthouse - Also known as East Quoddy Head Light, counterpart light on Canadian side
