= Herring Cove Provincial Park =

Provincial park in New Brunswick, Canada

Coordinates: 44.876734°N 66.936779°W

- IUCN category IV (habitat/species management area)
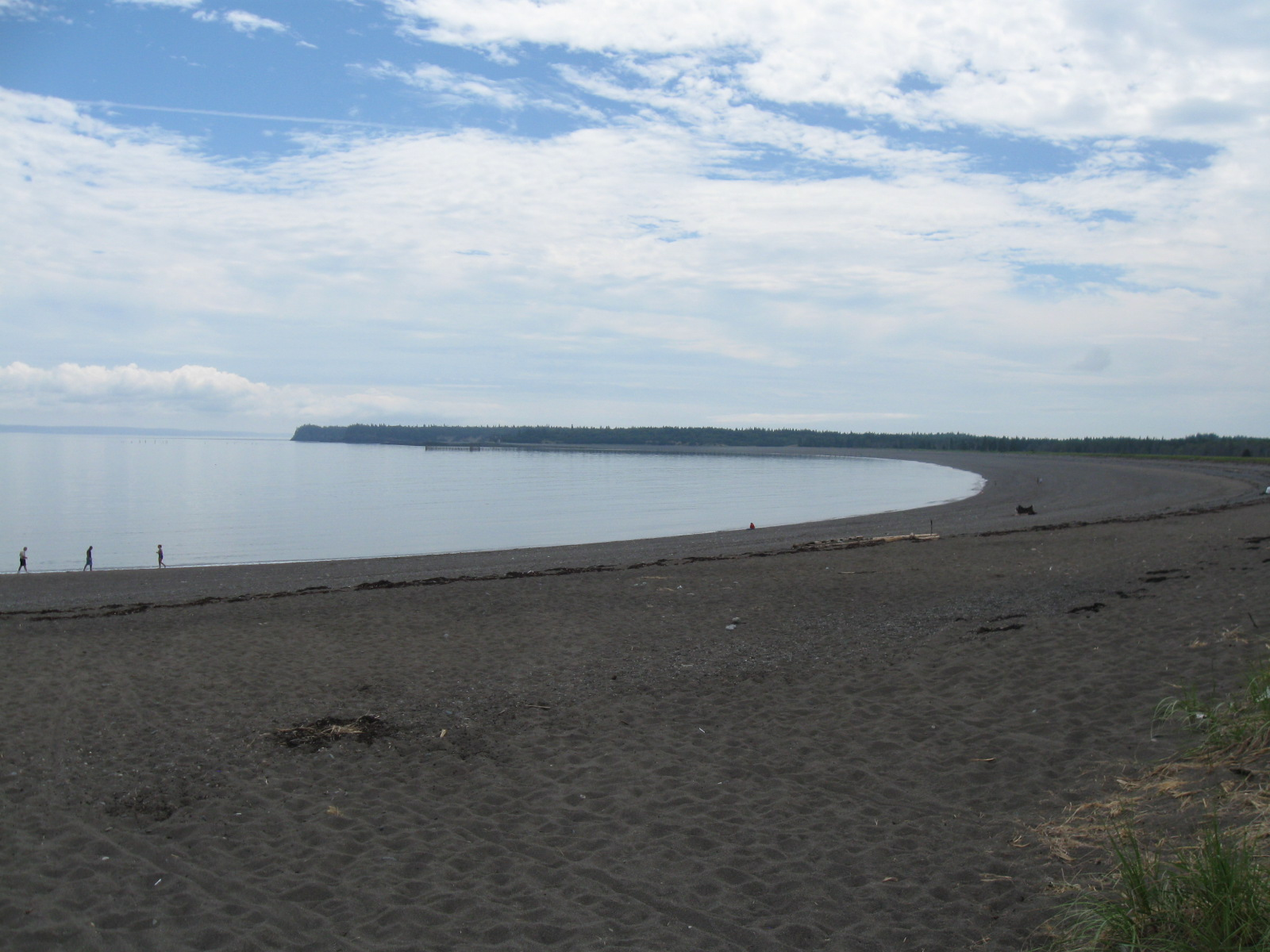
- Herring Cove
- Interactive map of Herring Cove Provincial Park
- Location: Campobello Island, New Brunswick, Canada
- Nearest city: Saint John, New Brunswick
- Visitors: n/a
- Governing body: Government of New Brunswick

Herring Cove Provincial Park is a provincial park located on Campobello Island, New Brunswick.

In addition to the campground and sandy beach, the provincial park has a seafood diner and golf course, which has won minor recognition. The park has seven trails, 88 campsites and 5 rustic shelters.

== History ==
The tent-camping facilities were vastly improved during the 1960s.

In 1973, a 50 cent entry fee was instituted causing island residents to protest. In 1980, a Tourism Centre was built in the park.
