= Western Passage =

Passage in New Brunswick, Canada

- Interactive map of Western Passage
- Location: Bay of Fundy
- Coordinates: 44°55′53″N 66°59′38″W
- Type: Passage
- Primary outflows: Bay of Fundy
- Basin countries: Canada; United States

The Western Passage is a passage off of the Bay of Fundy just north of Eastport, Maine, primarily between Moose Island and Deer Island. It is one of two passages into Passamaquoddy Bay, the other being the Letete Passage. Tidal range in the passage is 8.3m. Cod and lobster are fished in the waterway.
