= Quoddy Head State Park =

State park in Washington County, Maine

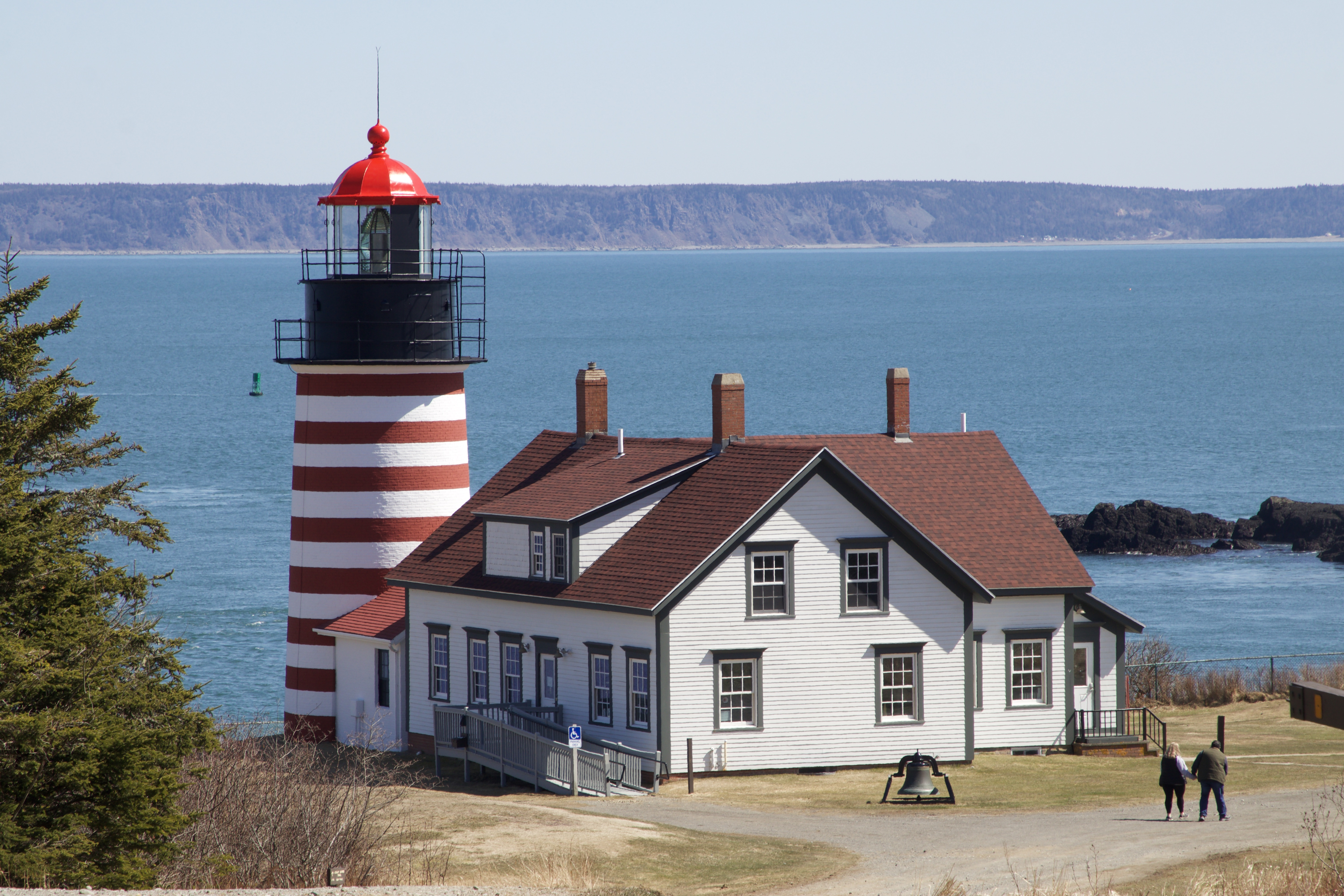
- West Quoddy Head Lighthouse and Quoddy Narrows, with Grand Manan Island, Canada, visible in the background

- Location within Maine
- Interactive map of Quoddy Head State Park
- Location: Lubec, Maine, United States
- Coordinates: 44°48′47″N 66°57′45″W
- Area: 541 acres (219 ha)
- Elevation: 148 ft (45 m)
- Established: 1962
- Visitors: 81,637 (in 2024)
- Administrator: Maine Department of Agriculture, Conservation and Forestry
- Website: Official website
- Maine State Parks

Quoddy Head State Park is a public recreation area in Lubec, Maine, located on the easternmost point of land in the continental United States. On its 541 acres (219 ha), purchased by the state in 1962, the state park features 5 miles (8 km) of hiking trails, extensive forests, two bogs, diverse habitat for rare plants, and the striking, red-and-white striped lighthouse tower of West Quoddy Head Light.

In 1808, West Quoddy Head Light became the easternmost lighthouse in the United States. Its light and fog cannon warned mariners of Quoddy's dangerous cliffs, ledges, and Sail Rock. Among the first to use a fog bell and later a steam-powered foghorn, this lighthouse greatly reduced shipwrecks in this foggy area, even as shipping increased. In 1858, the present red-and-white tower replaced the original. Monitored and serviced by the United States Coast Guard, its light still shines through its original third-order Fresnel lens. After automation in 1988, the light station became part of adjacent Quoddy Head State Park. A visitor center and museum in the former light keeper's quarters are run by the West Quoddy Head Light Keepers Association. The tower is closed to visitors.

For a few weeks around the equinoxes, West Quoddy Head is the first location in the United States to see the sunrise. Quoddy Head State Park is also the closest geographic point in the United States to the African continent.

== Gallery ==
Click right and left arrows for slideshow.

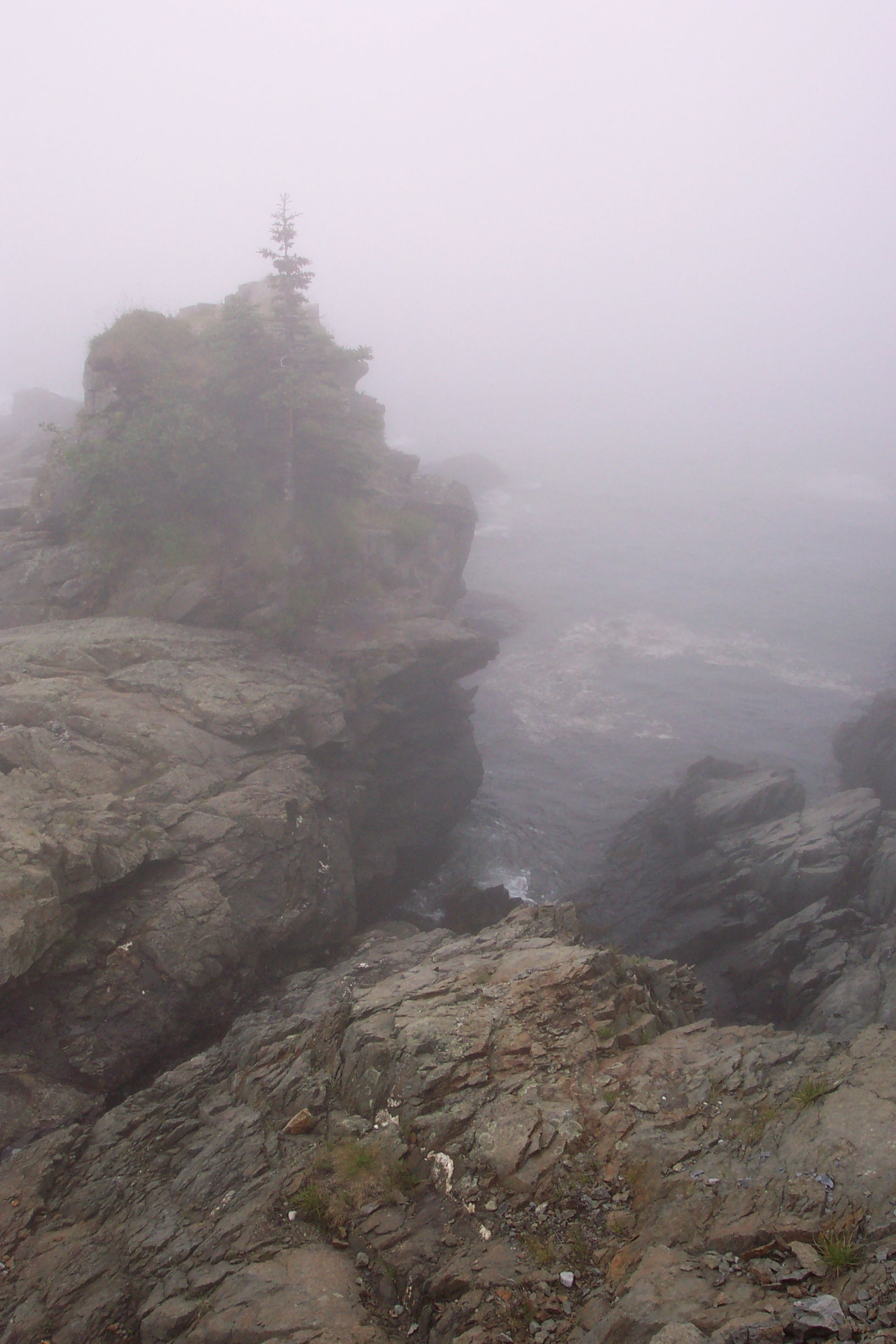
A foggy day on the rocky coast

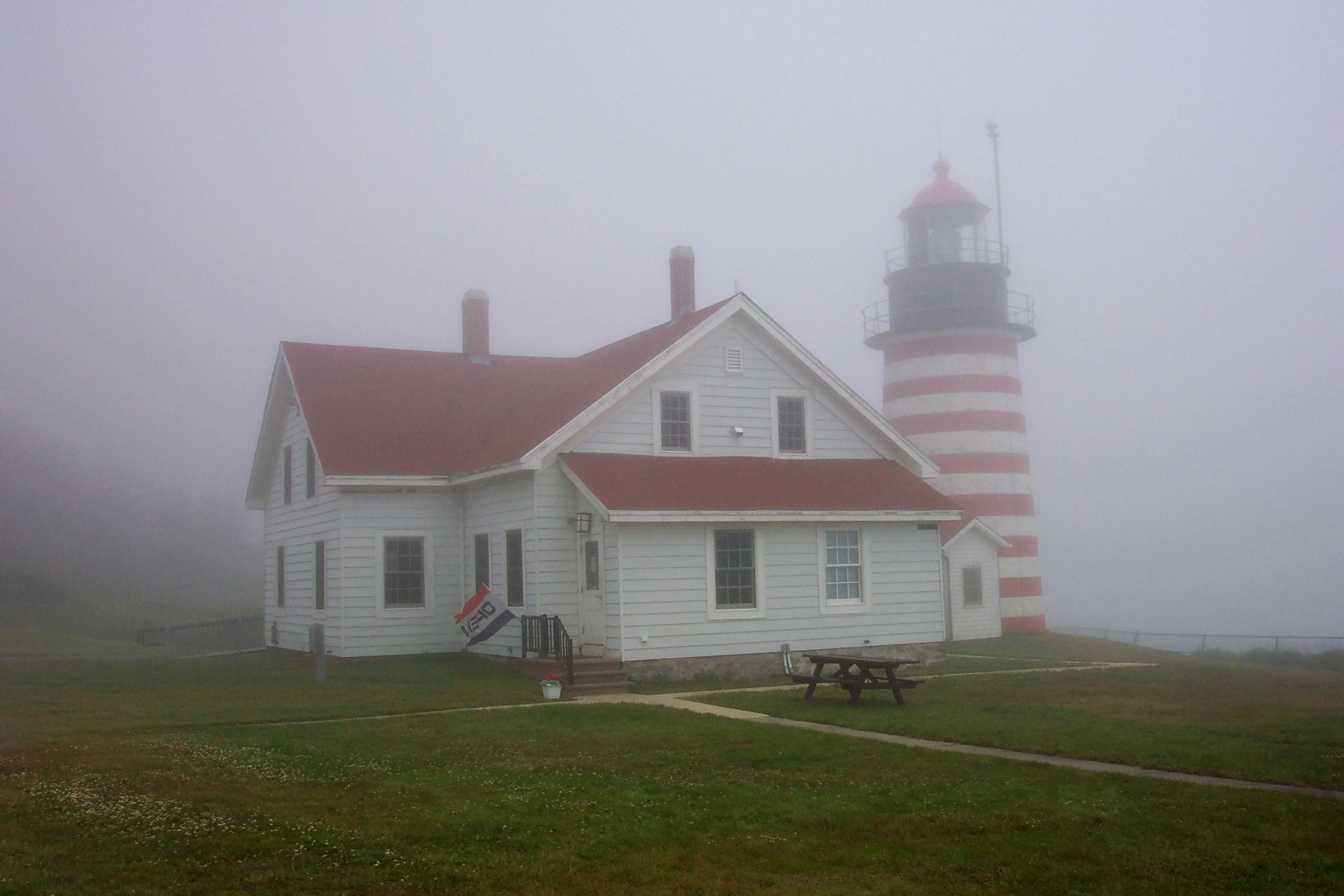
The light and keeper's house

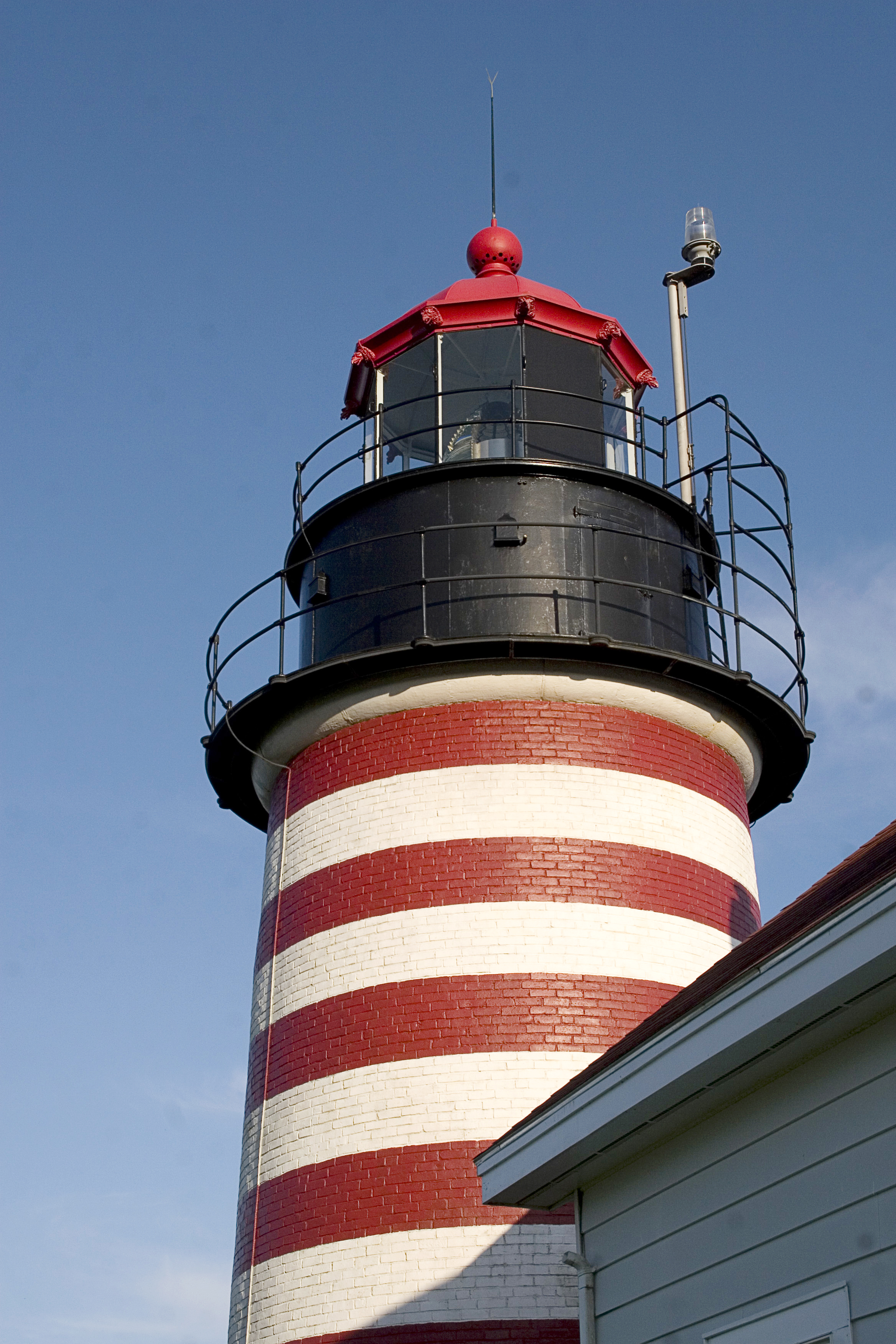
The light on a sunny day

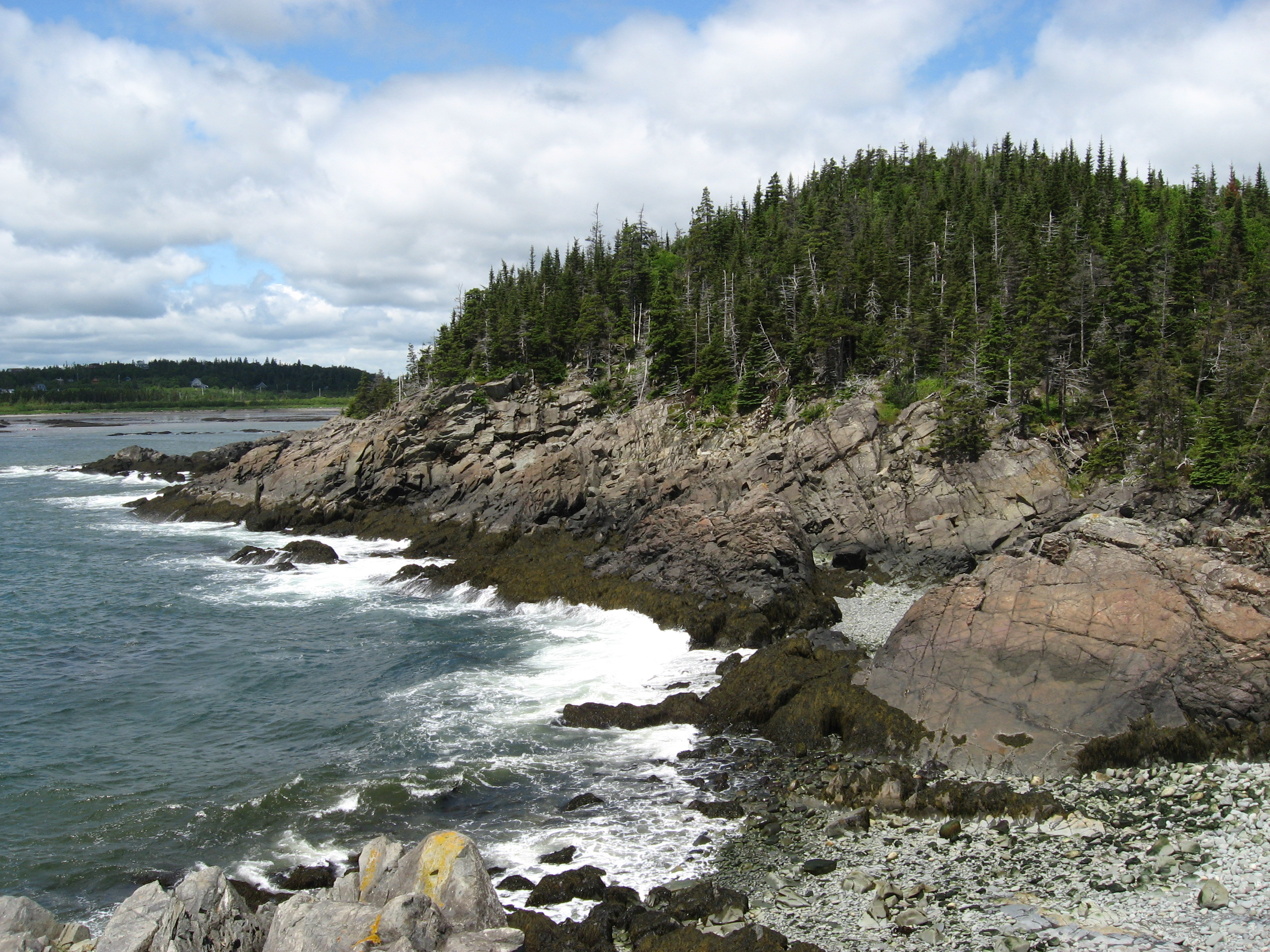
Like much of Maine, the coast at Quoddy Head is rocky

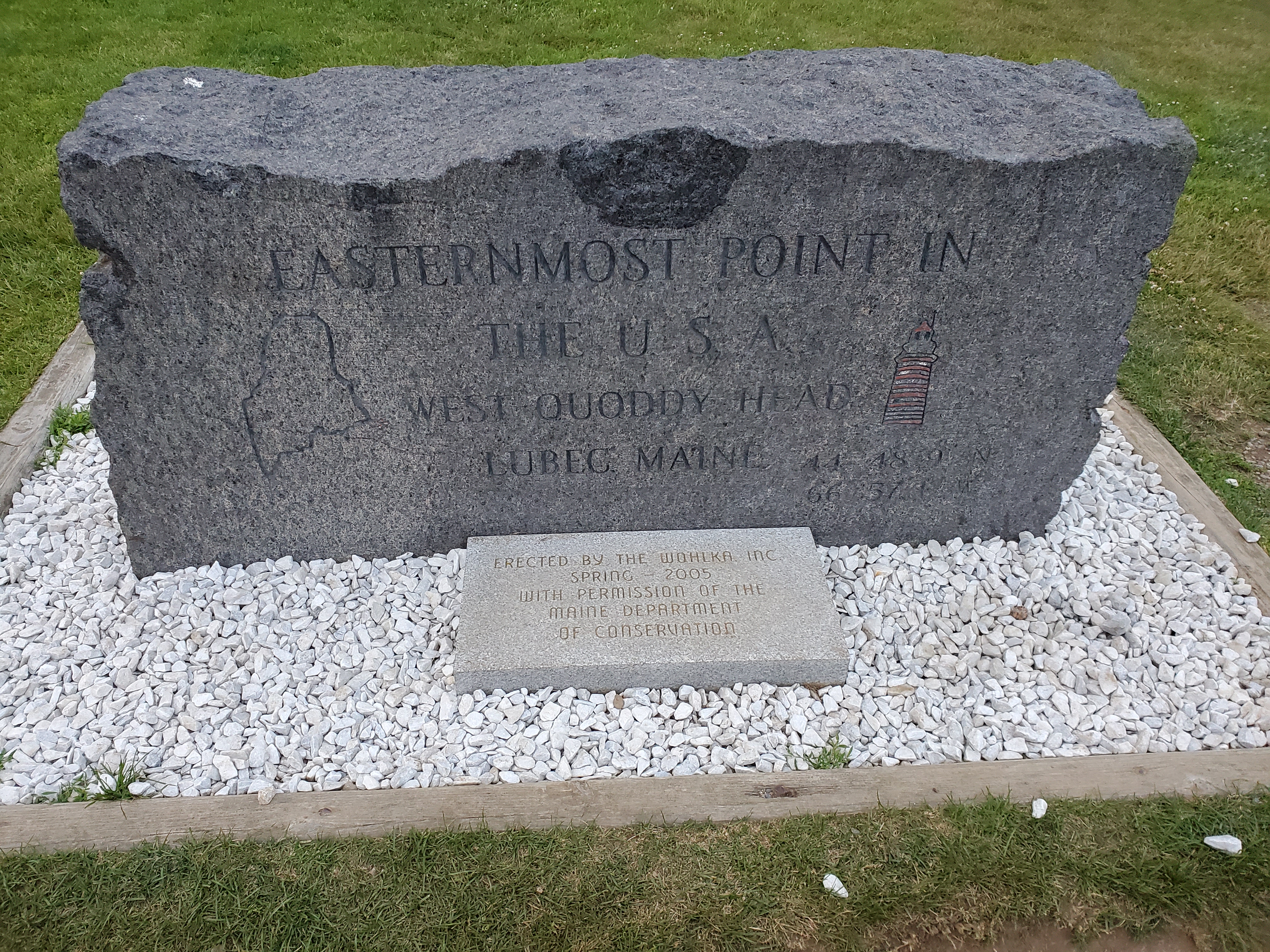
Most Eastern Point in the USA marker

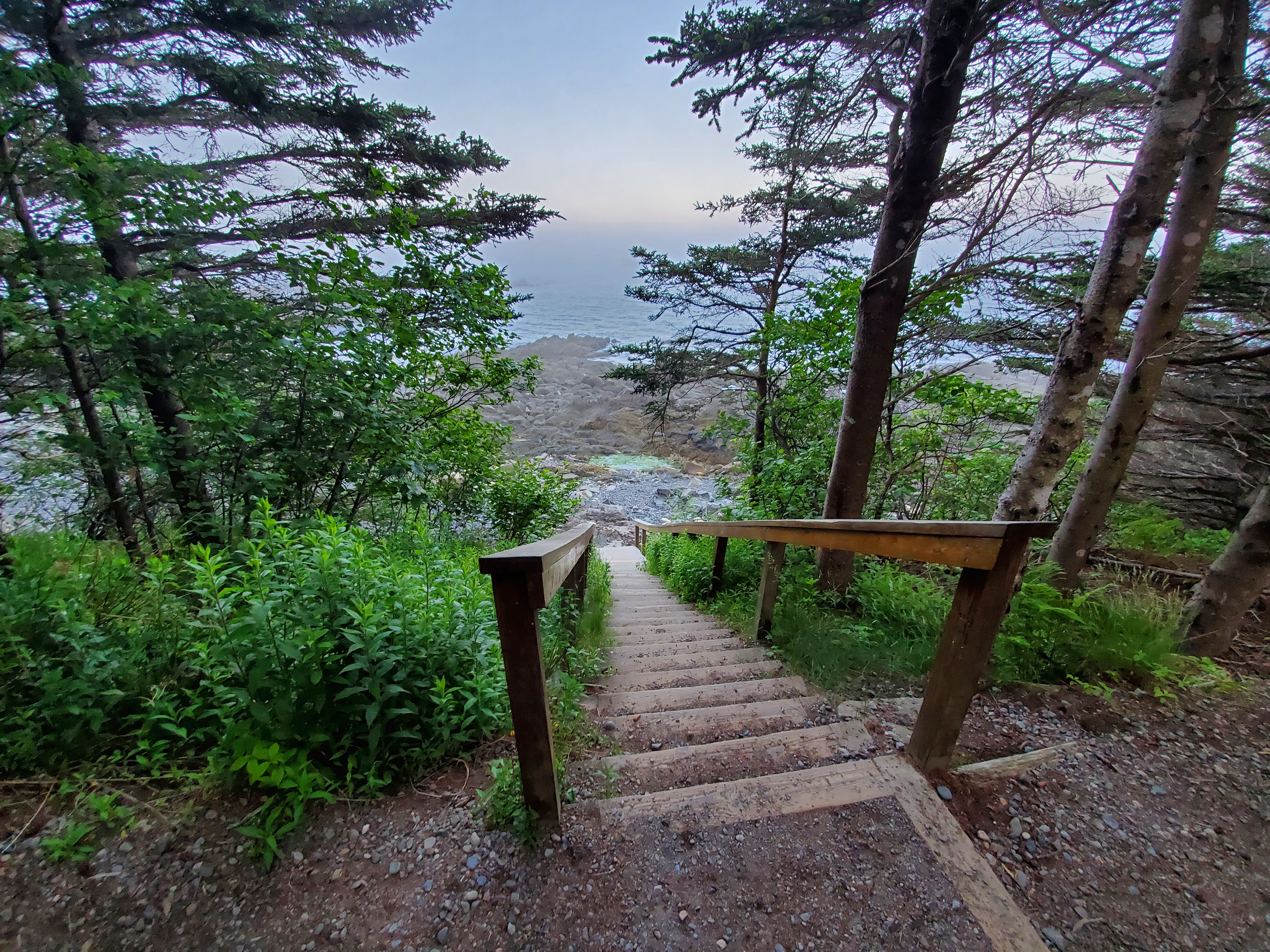
Staircase to the beach
