= Campobello Island =

Island in Campobello, New Brunswick, Canada

Campobello Island Port aux Coquilles (Seashell Harbour) Abahquict ("Parallel to Shore" or "Ocean Island")
- Rural community
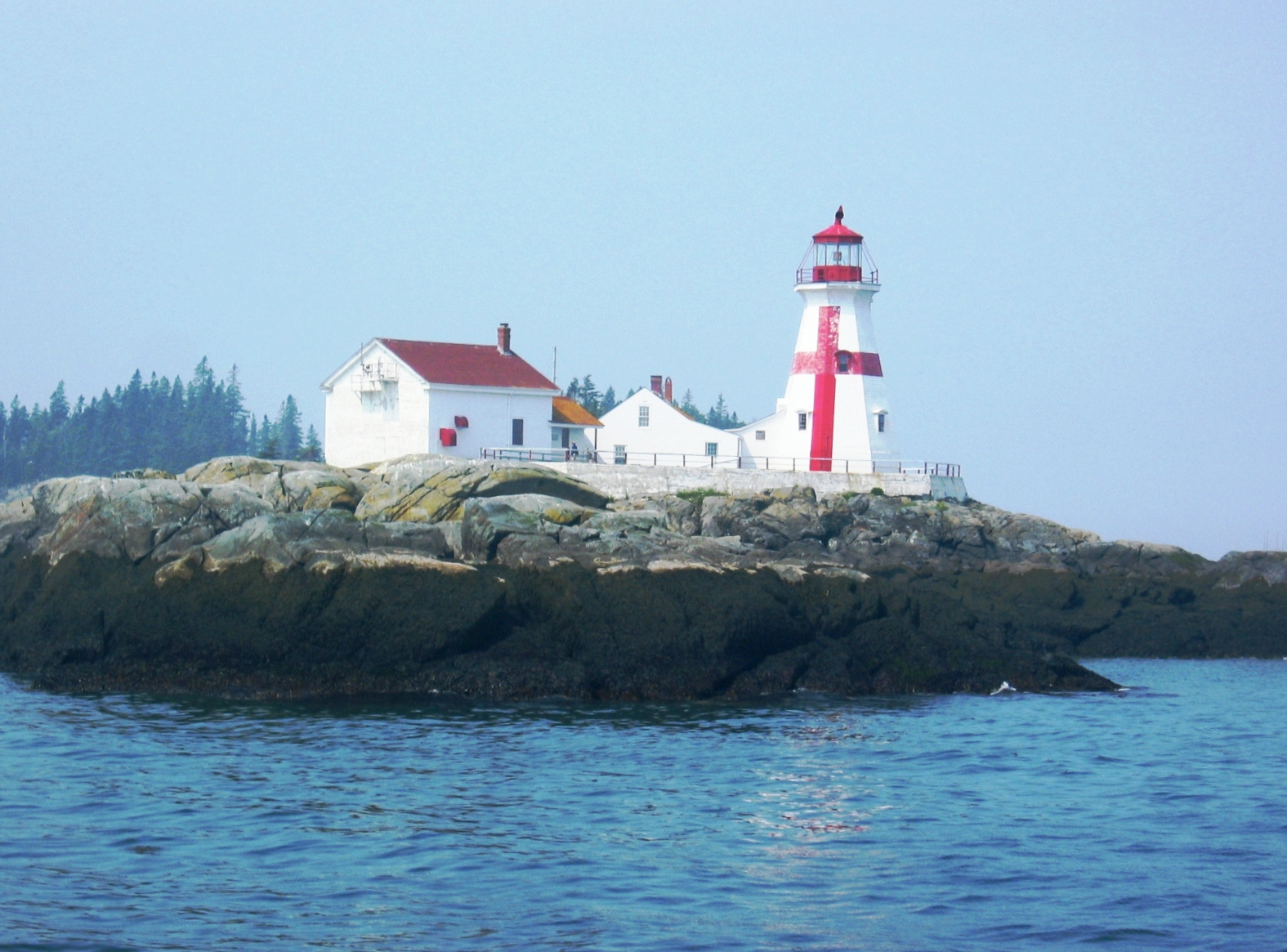
- Head Harbour Lighthouse and station, Passamaquoddy Bay

- Location of Campobello Island in Canada Campobello Island (New Brunswick)
- Coordinates: 44°53′N 66°56′W
- Country: Canada
- Province: New Brunswick
- County: Charlotte County
- Erected: 1803

Government
  - Mayor: Harvey Matthews
  - Councillor: Alex Carroll
  - Councillor: Kyle Fletcher
  - Councillor: Dianna Parker

Area
  - Land: 39.59 km^{2} (15.29 sq mi)
- Highest elevation: 90 m (300 ft)
- Lowest elevation: 0 m (0 ft)

Population (2021)
  - Total: 949
  - Density: 24/km^{2} (62/sq mi)
  - Pop 2016-2021: ▲8.8%
  - Pop 2016-2021 density: 24/km^{2} (62/sq mi)
  - Dwellings: 612
- Time zone: UTC-4 (AST)
  - Summer (DST): UTC-3 (ADT)

Campobello Island (/ˌkæm.pə.ˈbɛl.oʊ/, also US: /-.poʊ.ˈ-/) is the largest and only inhabited island in Campobello Parish in Charlotte County in southwestern New Brunswick, Canada, near the border with Maine, United States. It is the site of the Roosevelt Campobello International Park, Head Harbour Lighthouse, and of Herring Cove Provincial Park.

It has been an incorporated rural community since 2010 and is a member of the Southwest New Brunswick Service Commission (SNBSC).

In 1770, the island was granted to Capt. William Owen, who named it in honour of Lord William Campbell, who was governor of Nova Scotia, and noting "Campo Bello" meant "Beautiful Field" in Italian.

== History ==
=== History prior to Owens ===
There are no traces of settlement by the Passamaquoddy or Norsemen who may have visited the island. The first Europeans in the region were Pierre Dugua de Mons and Samuel de Champlain, who founded the nearby 1604 Saint Croix Island settlement.

In 1684, Jean Serreau di St Aubin was granted the seigniory of "Passamaquoddie". It has been speculated Serreau's fort, known to have been built somewhere in the Passamaquoddy Bay, may have been situated on Campobello. The 1689 the island was listed in the census s housing four men, four women, eight boys, five girls, four horses and seven cattle. In 1692 Jacques Petipas and the son of Serreau were taken prisoner by the British and sent to Boston. The 1693 census shows only three adults and four children on Campobello. In 1703, a penniless Serreau left the island with British permission to return to France, but by 1705 had been taken in as a charity case by a household in Port Royal, where he died.

The fort was vacated in the years surrounding King William's War and Benjamin Church's 1704 expulsion of the French from the Bay.

In 1713, the Treaty of Utrecht (1713) made the island part of British Nova Scotia. Campobello continued to be inhabited by the French family Dambois, and in 1722 Hibbert Newton Binney visited the island with Master James Blinn of the Ipswich, and the pair were beset by a dozen natives with axes and knives who demanded their ship, but accepted corn, gunpowder and ammunition as ransom.

The first known settler from the British Isles was James Boud of Kilmarnock, who settled in 1760.

=== Owens' era ===
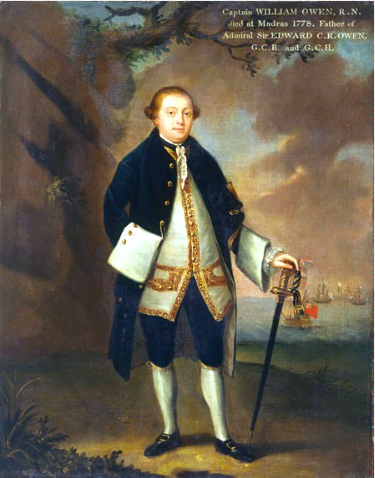
Captain William Owen

In 1765 Robert Wilson "and his strong-willed and fiery-tempered wife" Mary moved to Campobello as squatters, leading Owen to point out that only his Lancashire indentured servants had right to live on Campobello as he'd been drawing up designs for its settlement - though he tolerated the Wilsons.

On Sept 30, 1767 Lord William Campbell kept his promise to repay Owen, by arranging to have him granted Campobello Island; however since Owen's rank only entitled him to a much smaller estate, Campbell intentionally mis-reported the island as only containing 4000 acres rather than the correct 12,000 - and still needed to include Owen's three nephews as joint grantees in order to take control of the entire island.

In 1765, both Campobello and Deer Island were granted by the Crown to the Canada Company. By 1766, several families had taken up fishing on the northern part of the island.

Its first post office opened in 1795.

In 1770, the island was granted to Captain Owen who dubbed it "my island", and "just as a ship's master at-sea was the ultimate authority...Owen decided the best system for Campobello would be for the island to consider itself at-sea". Owen immediately set to work building a town he dubbed New Warrington (Wilson's Beach, today) but after only a year on the island in June 1771, Owen was recalled to active military service; he never returned to Campobello Island although still advertising for industrious farmers to help settle it before his 1778 death in Madras, India. His one year on the island "launched a feudal dynasty that was to reign well over a century".

In 1772, Plato Denny, of the original proprietors whom Owen had left behind to "direct, conduct and superintend the affairs of the island", quit his 3/16ths stake on Campobello in 1772 and declared that 27 indentured servants' longing for England was reason enough to return with a number of discontented early colonists. An award-winning study published by the National Genealogical Society suggests the alleged sinking of the ship with the death of all aboard was not truthful, but that with Owen's departure it was intended for all settlers to soon abandon the island, and that Denney himself later became a prolific slave trader based in Liverpool, England.

With the departure of the Snow Owen, only nine of the original British settlers remained on Campobello - and seen of them migrated to the mainland, leaving only Andrew Lloyd (grandfather of William Lloyd Garrison) and Mary Lawless - alongside newly-appointed magistrates of the Campobello Company Benjamin Yoxhall and John Moreau, and a host of New Englander settlers. Andrew Lloyd was the only Campobello resident to take up arms in the American Revolution, joining Joseph Gorham's loyalist Royal American Fencibles. Meanwhile the squatter Robert Wilson petitioned the magistrates to honour Owen's contract for 1000 tonnes of cut timber and title to his land, a squabble broke out, and in 1795 Wilson was appointed magistrate to replace Yoxhall - despite the resentment that Wilson had stoked concerns of Maritime Canada becoming the 14th colony to rebel against the Crown as he hoisted the American flag on Campobello at the outset of hostilities, noting his expectation the island would be seized by Americans. Wilson ultimately secured title to the 2,570 acres he claimed, with his widow later selling it and ultimately landing in the possession of Gillam Butler.

In 1785, the first recorded murder on Campobello occurred when John Dunbar killed his wife in a drunken rage after she stole his gold and buried it at DUnbar's Hill. He hid her body in a pork barrel and was ultimately hanged in St Andrews.

In 1796, judge David Owen drew a map of the Passamaquoddy Bay, identifying French settlements including one at Wilson's Beach.

During the War of 1812 the British Navy seized coastal lands in Maine as far south as the Penobscot River but returned them following the war, except for offshore islands. Capt. Owen wrote to the Prince Regent, noting that if the Crown insisted on ordering Campobello residents to perform military drills on the mainland as he had cautioned against, the Crown may find Campobello fighting against it, and stating "the Crown alone, without our consent, has no right to tax us", following on David Owen's 1796 entreaties to legislature that "the Crown had neither the right to tax the island nor to call up its men for military duty".

In 1817, the United States relinquished its claim to Campobello, Deer, and Grand Manan islands, in exchange for islands in Cobscook Bay. The provincial government of New Brunswick funded the construction of Head Harbour Lighthouse, or East Quoddy Head Light, in 1829; this light station would be a counterpart to West Quoddy Head Light which the United States built in the previous decades. As of 1842, Thomas Wyer was one of three commissioners of the lighthouses on Machias Seal Island, Campobello and at Saint Andrews.

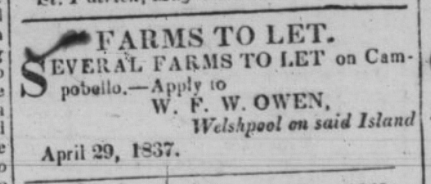
1837 advertisement by WFW Owen, seeking tenants for the island

From 1827-1835, "the history of the island is almost a blank...an agent was placed in charge of the island but it was not profitably managed.". In 1835, the illegitimate son of Captain Owen, Vice-Admiral William Fitzwilliam Owen, became sole proprietor of the island and took great interest in his advanced years in building the island community but struggled with an "addiction" to local women. He formed the Campobello Mill and Manufacturing Company to further development.

In 1866, a band of more than 700 members of the Fenian Brotherhood arrived at the Maine shore opposite the island with the intention of seizing Campobello but were dispersed by British warships from Halifax.

British naval officer John James Robinson became owner of the island in 1857 by virtue of having married Owen's daughter.

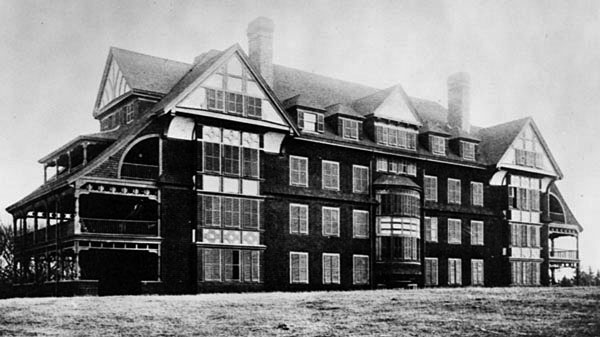
Tyn-y-Coed

In 1867, Captain Robinson Owen was staunchly against Canadian Confederation. In 1881, the widow of Capt. Robinson Owen sold 1,200 acres of the island to a group of American businessmen including James Roosevelt and the island was developed as a resort summer colony, which ended "the dynasty" of Owens ruling the island.

In 1872, Captain Robinson-Owen began trying to sell the island but died two years later - and his widow administered the island until 1881 with the help of his bailiff John Farmer - and alcohol smuggling became a large part of island economy. The Owens' share of the island was sold to developers.

=== Post Owens period ===
Between 1881-1883, the new Campobello Company erected three luxury hotels on the island, the Tyn-e-Coed, the Tyn-e-Maes and The Owen, at the same time The Algonquin and Bar Harbor resorts were being developed on the mainland. Campobello became home to a smaller and more exclusive development by several private American investors. A luxurious resort hotel was built and the island became a popular summer colony for wealthy Canadians and Americans, many of whom built grand estates there. One of the tacit purposes of the hotel business, was to offer a place where eligible unmarried women could meet and be paired with eligible unmarried men. Beginning in 1883, the Roosevelt family made Campobello Island their summer home. As of 1898, the island's businesses were listed as general shops run by Guilford Babcock, Alva Brown, Jackson Howard, Lissie Kelly, WE Ludlow and Lincoln Parker - as well as "Trader" JA Calder, fish merchant CH Basson and JA Sherlock's hotel.

Among those who built large new estates were Sara Ann Delano and her husband James Roosevelt Sr. from New York City. Sara Delano had a number of Delano cousins living in Maine, and Campobello offered a beautiful summer retreat where their family members could easily visit. From 1883 onward, the Roosevelt family made Campobello Island their summer home. Their son, Franklin D. Roosevelt, would spend his summers on Campobello from the age of one until, as an adult, he acquired a larger property — a 34-room "cottage" – which he used as a summer retreat until 1939.

It was at Campobello, in August 1921, that the future president fell ill and was diagnosed with polio, which resulted in his total and permanent paralysis from the waist down. Roosevelt did strive to regain use of his legs but never again stood or walked unassisted. His visits were mostly as a child, only staying overnight once while president. Franklin Delano Roosevelt Jr., the fifth of six children born to Franklin D. Roosevelt and Eleanor Roosevelt, was born on the island in August 1914.

By 1910, the island's three luxury hotels were waning in popularity.

=== History of religion ===
The journals of William Owen note that he held Anglican religious service in a shed for all the members of his new settlement on June 10, 1770 just days after their arrival. William's son David Owen built a church in which he himself preached and performed marriages, which was functionally the only religious effort being made in the Fundy Isles at that time. Upon taking over, David's brother William Fitzwilliam introduced a lesser form of Droit du seigneur, insisting that he personally had the right to every wife's first kiss on the island following marriage.

Captain Robinson Owen built a Baptist church at North Road that was destroyed and rebuilt following the Saxby Gale and Wilson's Beach remained staunchly Baptist, while Owen built a new Anglican church centered at Welchpool.

In 1842 the Anglican bishop consecrated the church and cemetery; the block of stone from which the baptismal font was carved was taken from the "Church of the Knights Templar at Malta" and transported by Admiral Owen's son-in-law, Captain John James Robinson.

In 1846, Rev. Harry Leigh Yewens was sent to Campobello and Deer Islanda where he spent three years as a catechist and teacher.

In 1854, the Christian Church of Campobello, associated with the New Light movement, united with the Free Christian Baptist Conference.

In 1855, Admiral Owen arranged the construction of St Anne's Anglican Church.

As with Grand Manan and Deer Island, the residents of Campobello were themselves teetotalers abstaining from alcohol, while smuggling it to sell in the United States. As of 1974, there was still no liquor store or tavern on the island, although two licensed restaurants operated.

=== History of smuggling ===
"A stranger would at first view say that little or no business was done here [in Eastport], but being situated so near the British boundary and from the number of large stores, it is very evident that smuggling to a great extent is carried on. The inhabitants of Eastport however seem to be a decent people.

— Allan Gilmour

The population was increased by United Empire Loyalists after the American Revolutionary War. Smuggling was a major part of the island's prosperity around this time, starting as soon as 1807 and contributing to residents' economic freedom from the Owens. It soon became "the centre of contraband trade with the United States", having smuggled primarily gypsum for fertilizer use since the start of the 19th century.

In later years, it was remarked that merchant ships secretly putting ashore at Eastport, Maine would report in ledgers that they travelled to "Sweden" once or twice a day with their wares. Many of the smuggling ships used Swedish flags or those of other unaligned European nations to avoid seizure. Following his defection, General Benedict Arnold set up a smuggling operation on Campobello Island transiting Saint John goods.

The first major regional smuggling trial convicted Gillam Butler of Campobello in 1796 of illegally importing US whale oil under the pretense it was harvested in New Brunswick. Southwestern New Brunswick smugglers in the late 18th century were "the overwhelming majority of the local political machinery, including the judiciary" - and a 1796 seizure found contraband tied to the "leading figures and magistrates" of Campobello, Grand Manan and Indian Islands. Butler's ongoing trade with Captain Storrow, led Squire Owen to evict their wives and children from their homes and seize their personal belongings in December 1788 - and when their families sought refuge across the border on Maine's Frederick Island with silver they had hidden in the forest, Owen pursued them with an armed posse that he ordered to break into the home of Customs Collector Lewis Delesdernier - but the latter's armed defiance and protection of the women and children caused the posse to refuse so Owen seized a cow and retreated back to Campobello.

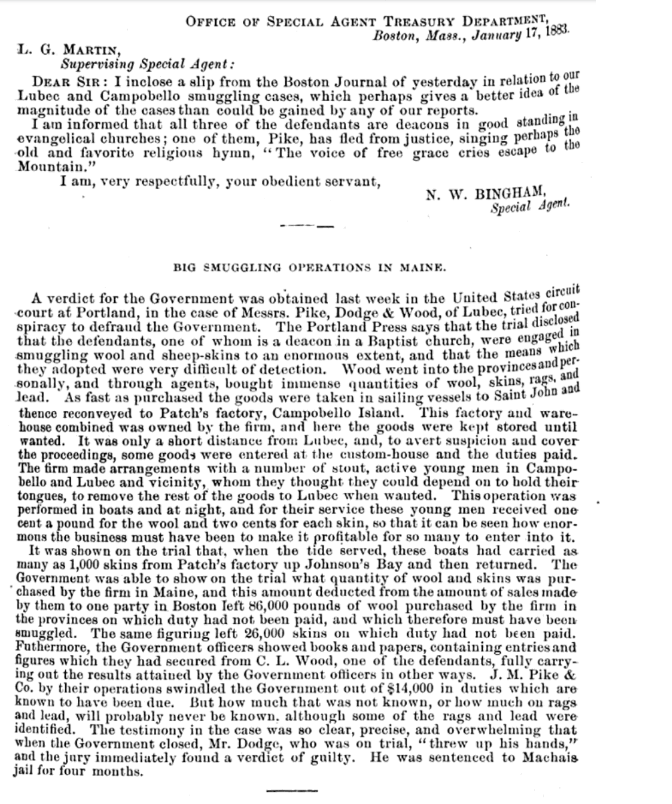
Treasury Department agents exchange letters and articles about the evangelical deacons smuggling operation.

In 1808 it was noted in US military channels that the settlement of Moose Island had grown solely through its ability to smuggle goods with Campobello. During the War of 1812, the need for American food to move into Canada and British goods to move into the United States led historian Charles W. Kendall to assert that "during the war there was a tacit treaty on the Maine and New Brunswick frontier...customs officials did not recognize it, but American and British merchants did." The close of the war brought an end to the first major period of smuggling on Campobello.

In 1831, Secretary of the Board of Trade John MacGregor bluntly stated his disapproval of Grand Manan, noting "mostly from Maine and resemble Americans in attitude. They have a reputation for being scheming and overreaching...a great smuggling area.", and dismissing Campobello as "another smuggling notch". In 1847 it was noted Campobello's "great facilities for smuggling along this part of the American line are not overlooked by the inhabitants".

Throughout the 19th century, smuggling was a major industry on Campobello. In 1898 it was noted that "many of the inhabitants here may be considered...daring in carrying on a successful illicit trade, to rival Dirk Hatteraick. There were two warehouses on Campobello dedicated to holding rum, Holland gin, Irish and Scotch whisky and French wines awaiting illicit transit to the United States.

Smuggling, or rum running, became notable again following the 1870 economic downturn and reached its heydey during the 1920s Prohibition. Police boats began waiting in the waters to intercept and search vessels travelling between the countries. In 1883, the US Treasury Department charged three evangelical deacons from Lubec with smuggling "immense quantities of wool, skins, rags and lead" purchased in New Brunswick and brought to Patch's Factory of Campobello to be sneaked across the border by locals at night.

In the 1920s during Prohibition, a five-gallon keg of diamond rum cost 17 cents in Jamaica, and sold for $40 in the United States.

In 2019, senator David Adams Richards raised concerns that the anti-smuggling provisions of Bill C-21 would unfairly target Campobello residents who needed to bring materials through the United States.

=== History of shipwrecks ===
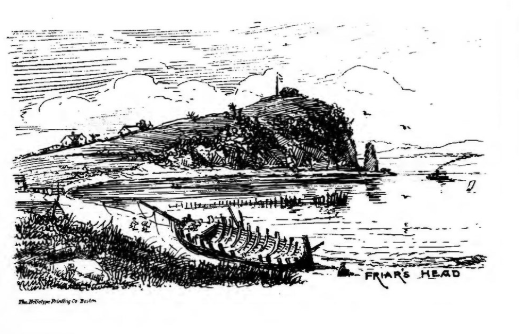
An illustration of a shipwreck from a tourism booklet.

On May 24, 1841 the Admiral Benbow was wrecked on the shore of Campobello, with all crew rescued.

On January 21, 1865, the British-flagged schooner Liseon was wrecked on the shore of Campobello.

In February 1855, the British-flagged War Eagle wrecked on Campobello Island after departing Saint John for Liverpool, but was refloated.

In 1876, the Snow Bird was wrecked.

== Geography ==
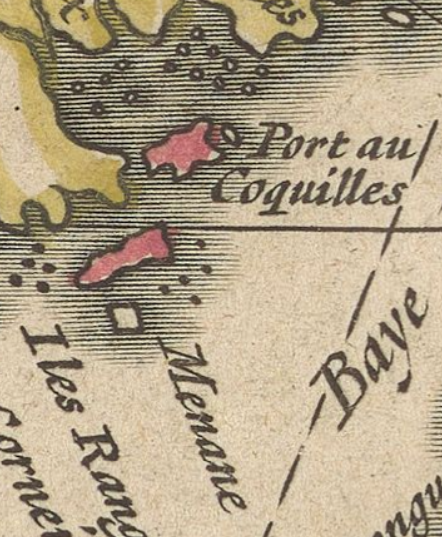
Campobello, named as Port au Coquilles, as shown on the 1630 map of Joannes de Laet

The island is at the entrance to Passamaquoddy Bay, adjacent to the entrance to Cobscook Bay, and within the Bay of Fundy. The island is one of the Fundy Islands, and has no road connection to the rest of Canada; it is connected by the Franklin Delano Roosevelt Bridge to nearby Lubec, Maine. Reaching the mainland while remaining in Canada is possible only during the tourism season and requires a ferry to nearby Deer Island, and a subsequent ferry to L'Etete. Trucks containing goods deliveries and mail from the rest of Canada travel through the United States to access the island, under a special arrangement.

Its climate is milder than the mainland.

Naturalist William Gilson Farlow travelled to Campobello in 1898 and 1902 to study its algae, but was unimpressed by its inaccessibility and instead recorded its fungi and lichens.

The ferry to Deer Island was stopped in 2017 after the boat sank, leaving the island without a direct connection to the rest of Canada. Service was restored and became year-round due to the COVID pandemic.

Measuring 14 kilometres (8.7 mi) long and about five kilometres (3.1 mi) wide, it has an area of 39.6 square kilometres (15.3 sq mi). On the north is a high bluff headland, East Quoddy Point. On the west are Charley Point and the Mulholland Point navigation light.

== Economy ==
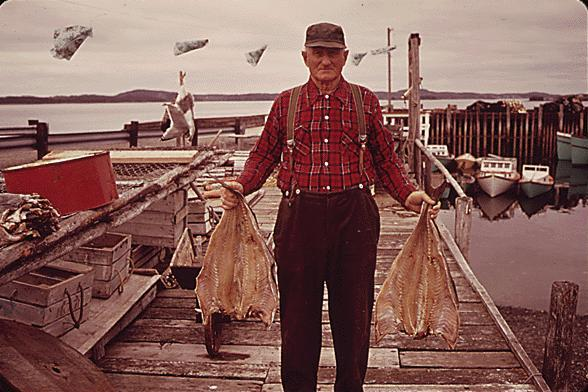
Campobello fisherman in 1973

Under its time as the Owen family's "private feudal estate", the island issued their own Campobello currency emblazoned with the motto "Flecti Non Frangi" ("To Bend, Not to Break.").

The island has several good harbours, and the majority of residents are employed in the fishing, aquaculture or tourism industries.

In 1964, the New Brunswick Fishermen's Loan Board financed a purse seine vessel for Campobello which brought in 90 metric tons of skipjack tuna, the first commercial catch by Eastern Canadians as part of the broader provincial effort to diversify fisheries.

As of 1966, Quebec corporation Ran-Lux Mines had obtained 25 mining claims totaling 1000 acres on Campobello, and five claims about 200 acres on Deer Island.

The two major tourist attractions on the island are Herring Cove Provincial Park and Roosevelt Campobello International Park. The latter was created in 1964 and was officially opened by U.S. President Lyndon Johnson and Canadian Prime Minister Lester Pearson in 1966. The island has an annual Seaglass Festival through September, the Summer Music & Arts FogFest, and since 2025 a 25K and 50K Coastal Challenge race.

In 2022, Campobello had 74 tax sales, largely consisting of 3,900 acres of properties tied to Bill Clinton's Whitewater scandal. The properties had been part of a real estate investment that foresaw opening a ski jumping hill.

== Education ==
The island has one school, Campobello Island Consolidated School, for all school grades, in the Anglophone South School District.

== Infrastructure ==
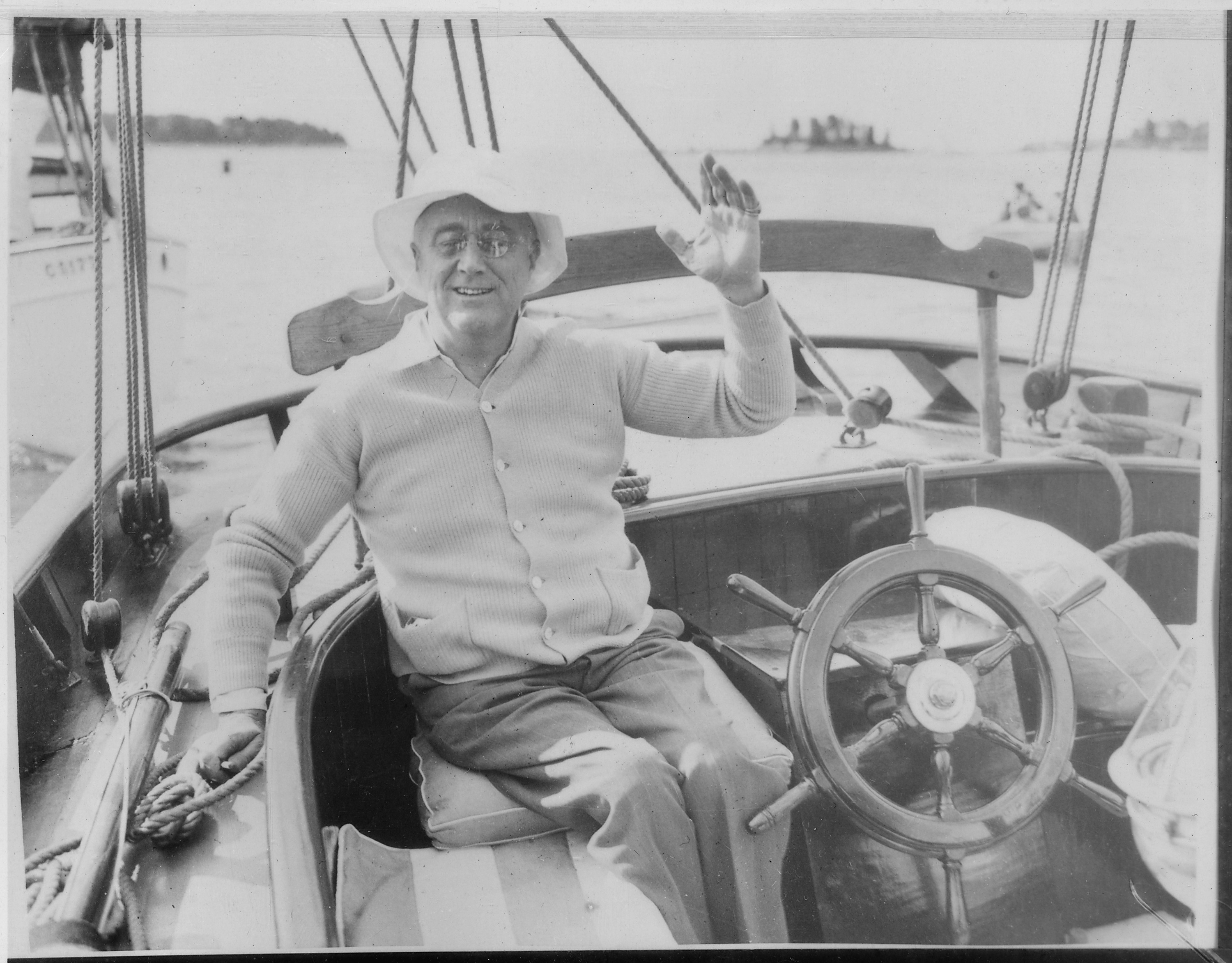
Franklin D. Roosevelt on Campobello, 1933

The island's only highway, Route 774, is connected by the Franklin Delano Roosevelt Bridge to Lubec, Maine. Its only connection with the Canadian mainland is through a seasonal ferry to Deer Island which goes onward to the mainland.

United States Customs and Border Protection began searching packages to the island originating in Canada in 2019, prompting outcry.

In 2020, residents renewed demands for a bridge, due to the restrictions imposed on both sides of the border during the COVID-19 pandemic in North America. The government paid for an autumn extension of the ferry until winter.

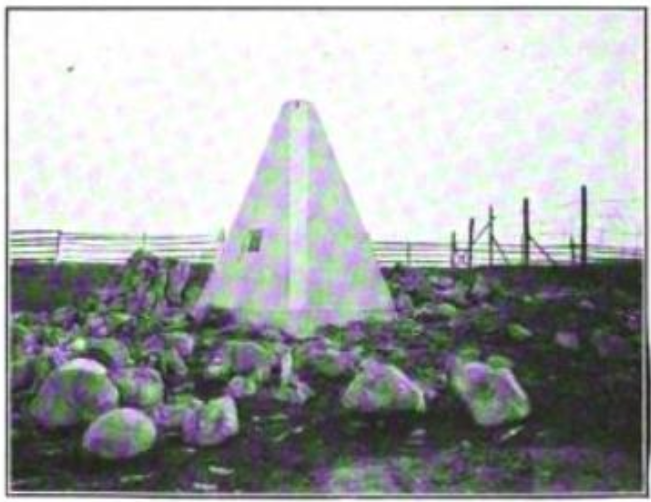
Geodetic trig points were installed in Campobello to delineate the US/Canada border.

Communities within the rural community include North Road, Otter Cove, Welshpool and Wilsons Beach.

Bodies of water around Campobello include Friars Bay, Lake Glensevern, Harbour de Lute (Harbour of Otters), Head Harbour, Lubec Channel, Lubec Narrows, Mill Cove Creek, Mill Stream, Quoddy Narrows, and the larger Passamaquoddy Bay.

== Demographics ==
As of 1975, the majority of the island's population belonged to one of ten families. Islanders were noted to have a unique accent that included broad "a" and slurred "r".

In the 2021 Census of Population conducted by Statistics Canada, Campobello Island had a population of 949 living in 423 of its 612 total private dwellings, a change of 8.8% from its 2016 population of 872. With a land area of 39.59 km^{2} (15.29 sq mi), it had a population density of 24.0/km^{2} (62.1/sq mi) in 2021.

Canada census – Campobello Island community profile

	2021	2016	2011
Population	949 (+8.8% from 2016)	872 (-5.7% from 2011)	925 (-12.4% from 2006)
Land area	39.59 km^{2} (15.29 sq mi)	39.67 km^{2} (15.32 sq mi)	39.67 km^{2} (15.32 sq mi)
Population density	24/km^{2} (62/sq mi)	22.0/km^{2} (57/sq mi)	23.3/km^{2} (60/sq mi)
Median age	50.8 (M: 48.0, F: 52.0)	48.4 (M: 48.2, F: 48.4)	46.0 (M: 46.1, F: 45.9)
Private dwellings	612 (total) 423 (occupied)	616 (total)	641 (total)
Median household income	$66,000	$52,139

References: 2021 2016 2011

Historical census data
Campobello Parish, NB

Year	Pop.	±%
1991	1,317	—
1996	1,305	−0.9%
2001	1,195	−8.4%

Year	Pop.	±%
2006	1,056	−11.6%
2011	925	−12.4%
2016	872	−5.7%

Year	Pop.	±%
2021	949	+8.8%

Campobello federal election results
Year	Conservative		Liberal		Green		New Democratic		Libertarian	
2025 - 453 votes	67.1%	304	27.8%	126	1.8%	8	2.2%	10	0.9 %	4

Campobello provincial election results
Year	PC		Liberal		Green		NDP		PANB		Libertarian	
2024 - 345 votes	51.6%	178	13.9%	48	22%	76	1.7%	6	0.9%	3	8.1%	28

=== Language ===
Canada census mother tongue - Campobello Parish, New Brunswick
Census	Total	English			French			English & French			Other		
Year	Responses	Count	Trend	Pop %	Count	Trend	Pop %	Count	Trend	Pop %	Count	Trend	Pop %
2011	895	885	▼10.2%	98.88%	5	▼83.3%	0.56%	0	0.0%	0.00%	5	▼75.0%	0.56%
2006	1,035	985	▼15.4%	95.17%	30	▲ n/a%	2.90%	0	0.0%	0.00%	20	▲ n/a%	1.93%
2001	1,165	1,165	▼9.0%	100.00%	0	0.0%	0.00%	0	0.0%	0.00%	0	0.0%	0.00%
1996	1,280	1,280	n/a	100.00%	0	n/a	0.00%	0	n/a	0.00%	0	n/a	0.00%

== In fiction ==
Arlo Bates set his novel A Lad's Love on Campobello Island.

Margaret Atwood's novel The Testaments, the sequel to The Handmaid's Tale, ends on the safety of Campobello Island.

The 1960 film Sunrise at Campobello, based on the play of the same name, is a drama tracing Franklin D. Roosevelt around Campobello where it was also filmed.
