= Passamaquoddy Bay =

International inlet of the Bay of Fundy

Coordinates: 45°05′N 67°05′W

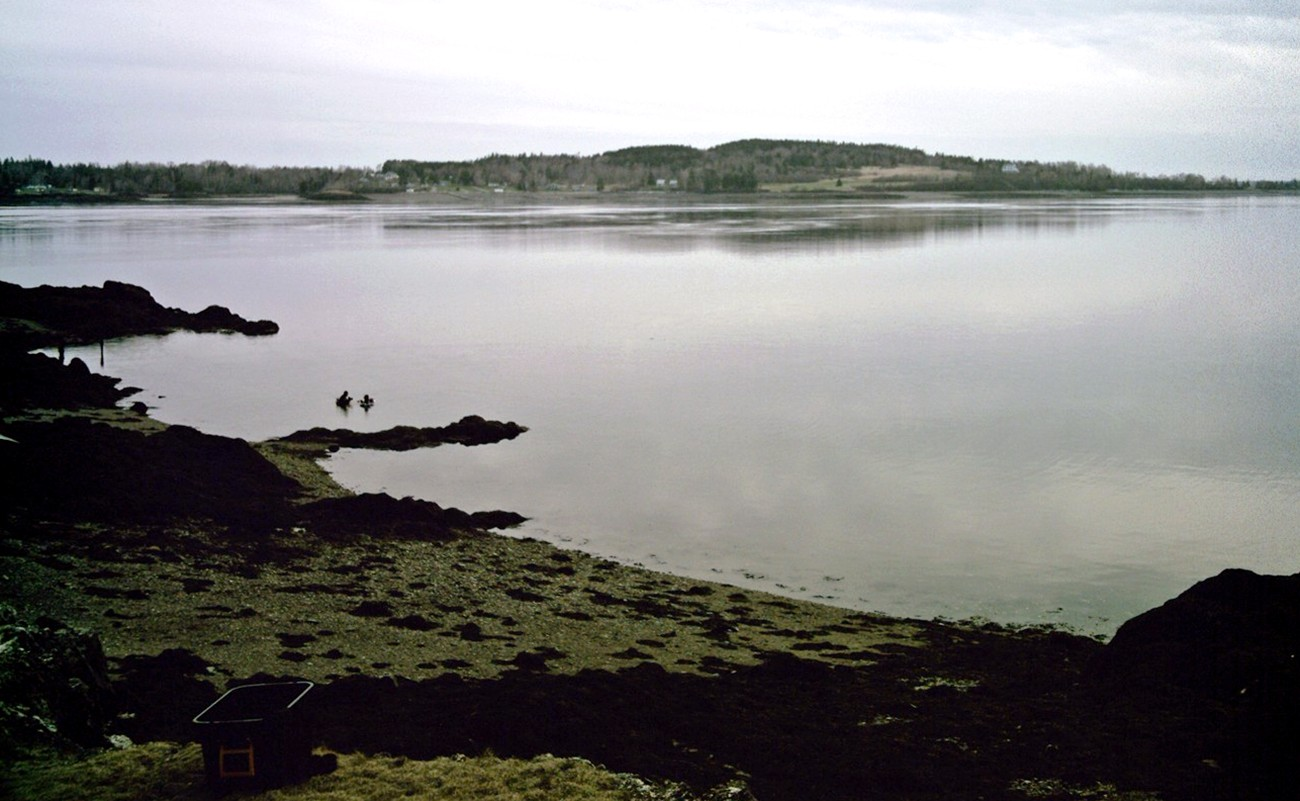

Passamaquoddy Bay (French: Baie de Passamaquoddy) is an inlet of the Bay of Fundy, between the U.S. state of Maine and the Canadian province of New Brunswick, at the mouth of the St. Croix River.

Most of the bay lies within Canada, with its western shore bounded by Washington County, Maine. The southernmost point is formed by West Quoddy Head on the U.S. mainland in Lubec, Maine; and runs northeasterly through Campobello Island, New Brunswick, engulfing Deer Island, New Brunswick, to the New Brunswick mainland head at L'Etete, New Brunswick in Charlotte County, New Brunswick.

It was first settled at St. Croix Island in 1604, and later French colonies were set up on Indian Island and forts built by Sieur de St. Aubin, and Chartier although most French settlers were expelled by Benjamin Church in the years following King William's War - the Bay sat mostly unpopulated until the 1760s saw English settlement. While the exact location of St. Aubin's fort is unknown, it has been postulated to have been built on Campobello or Indian Island.

== Overview ==
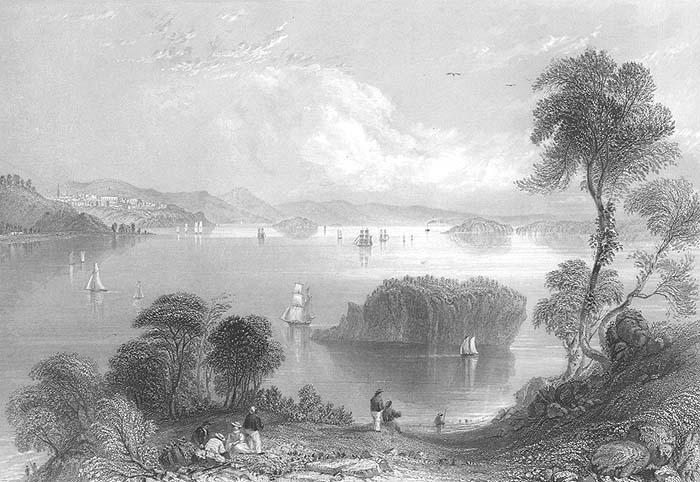
Eastport and Passamaquoddy Bay, 1839, by William Henry Bartlett

Local folklore suggests there are 365 islands in the bay. The exact demarcation of the border in Passamaquoddy Bay was a long-standing issue between the United States and Britain/Canada. Already the Treaty of Ghent, ending the War of 1812, included a provision for the appointment of "commissioners to divide the islands of Passamaquoddy Bay between the United States and Great Britain" (see John Holmes). Nevertheless, confusions and ambiguities on this issue persisted.

The southern boundaries of the bay are sometimes confused since Deer Island sections off the large open waters of the bay; however, the terminology of the Passamaquoddy Bay Treaty of 1910 specifies that Passamaquoddy Bay runs south of Treat Island (one of the islands that now comprise the city of Eastport, Maine), between Campobello Island and Lubec, Maine:

"Now, therefore, upon the evidence and arguments so presented, and after taking into consideration all actions, of the respective Governments and of their representatives authorized in that behalf and of the local governments on either side of the line, whether prior or subsequent to such treaties and award, tending to aid in the interpretation thereof, the High Contracting Parties hereby agree that the location of the international boundary line between the United States and the Dominion of Canada from a point in Passamaquoddy Bay accurately defined in the Treaty between Great Britain and the United States of April 11, 1908, as, lying between Treat Island and Friar Head, and extending thence through Passamaquoddy Bay and to, the middle of Grand Manan Channel, shall run in a series of seven connected straight lines for the distances and in the directions as follows."

The largest community on Passamaquoddy Bay proper is St. Andrews, New Brunswick, but the twin communities of Calais-St. Stephen are sometimes included, despite being located on the St. Croix River. The city of Eastport, Maine lies between Passamaquoddy Bay and Cobscook Bay, to the city's west. The narrow passage between Maine and Deer Island is known as Western Passage. The passage between Eastport, Maine, and Friar Bay, Campobello Island, is known as Friar Roads.

Although it is rare, the Passamaquoddy Bay does occasionally freeze over - including in the winter of 1922 when men were able to cross from Deer Island to St. Andrews over the ice.

The three entrances into Passamaquoddy Bay from the Bay of Fundy are Letete Passage northeast of Deer Island, Head Harbour Passage to the southeast of Deer Island and northwest of Campobello Island, and Quoddy Narrows, between southern Lubec, Maine, and southern Campobello Island. Running north from West Quoddy Head in Lubec, the passages known as Quoddy Narrows, Lubec Channel, Lubec Narrows, Friar Roads, and Western Passage also host the International Boundary between Canada and the United States.

The Head Harbour Passage is the deepwater entry to the Bay. The US and Canadian governments agree that the passage is Canadian. The US government believes that it is a territorial sea in which international law gives commercial vessels a right of passage. The Canadian government believes that it can regulate passage and is considering doing so to prevent the use by supertankers carrying cargo to liquified natural gas plants proposed for the American coast of the bay.

== Smuggling ==
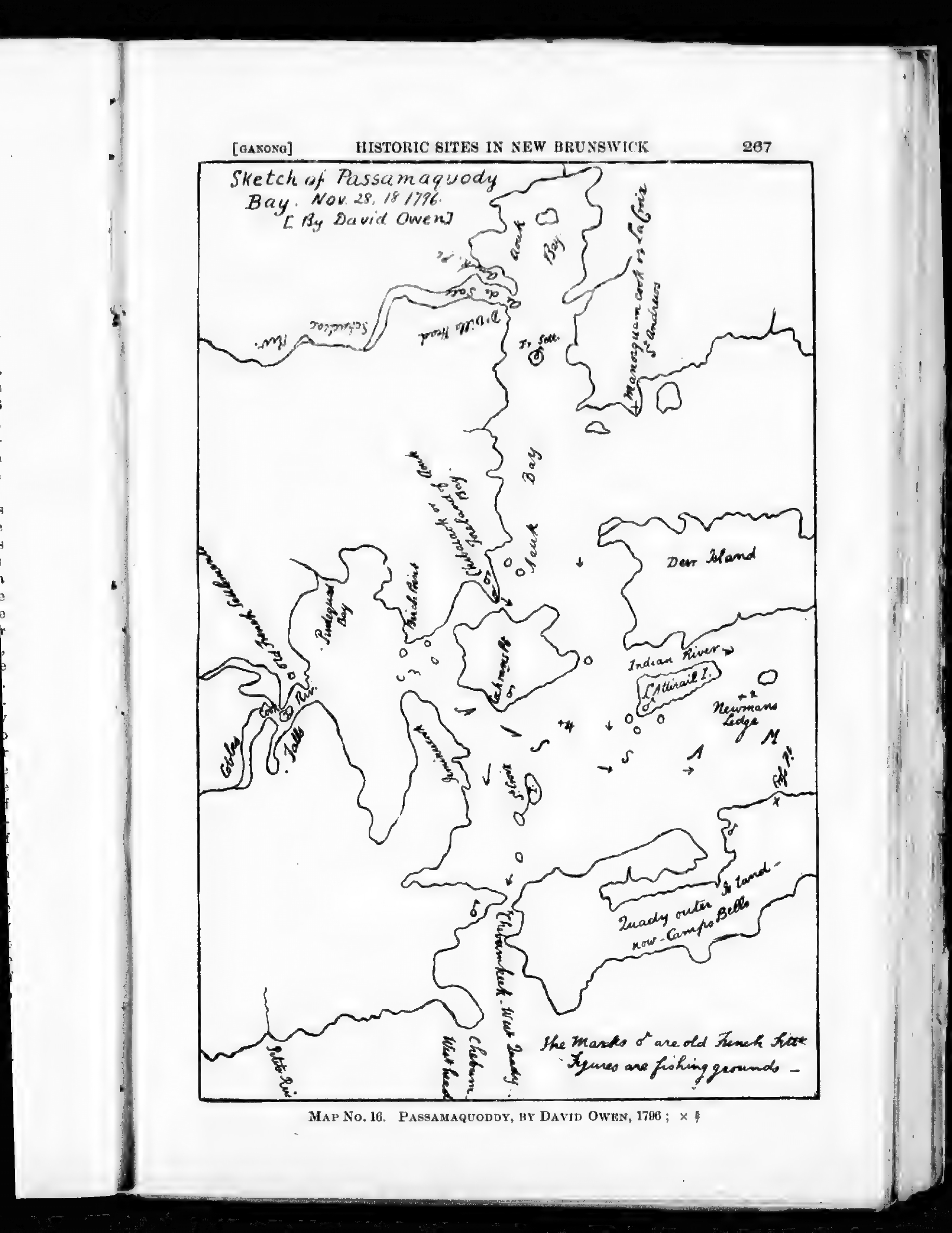
1796 map by David Owen.

After the American Revolution, Passamaquoddy Bay was the scene of a thriving smuggling trade. Smuggling peaked in 1808 during Jefferson's Embargo, when smugglers illegally moved tens of thousands of barrels of American flour from American territory into New Brunswick.

During the War of 1812, a thriving illicit trade in British manufactured goods existed. After the War of 1812, the primary smuggled good was gypsum from Nova Scotia, which was usually deposited directly into American vessels on or near the border. Smuggling was winked at by both officials and locals in the region, who discouraged outside intervention by British or American authorities who wanted to stop or control it.

== See also ==
- Old Sow Whirlpool
