= WAKE =

WAKE may refer to:

- WAKE (AM), a radio station (1500 AM) licensed to Valparaiso, Indiana, United States
- WAKE (cipher), Word Auto Key Encryption
- WAKE (novel), a young adult novel by Lisa McMann
- WAKE Radio, the student-operated radio station at Wake Forest University in Winston-Salem, North Carolina, United States
- Bade Airport, the airport in Papua, Indonesia, assigned ICAO code WAKE

== See also ==
- Wake (disambiguation)
