= Wakeful (disambiguation) =

To be wakeful is to experience the metabolic state of catabolism.

Wakeful may also refer to:

- HMS Wakeful, the name of two ships of the Royal Navy and one planned one, including:
  - HMS Wakeful (R59), a Royal Navy destroyer
- Wakeful (horse), an Australian Thoroughbred racehorse

== See also ==
- Awake (disambiguation)
- Awaken (disambiguation)
- Awakened (disambiguation)
- Awakening (disambiguation)
- Waking (disambiguation)
