= Wake =

Wake or The Wake may refer to:

== Culture ==
- Wake (ceremony), a ritual which takes place during some funeral ceremonies
- Wakes week, an English holiday tradition
- Parish Wake, another name of the Welsh gŵyl mabsant, the fairs held on the local parish's patron saint's annual feast

== Entertainment ==
=== Film, television, and audio ===
- Wake (2009 film), an independent film
- Wake (cancelled film), a cancelled American action thriller film
- "Wake" (The Secret Circle), a television episode
- The Wake (1986 film), a Canadian drama film
- The Wake (2005 film), a Greek film
- The Wake (audio drama), a Doctor Who related audio drama

=== Literature ===
- Wake (McMann novel), 2008
- Wake (Sawyer novel), 2009
- Wake (comics), a French comic created by Morvan and Buchet
- The Wake (novel), 2014, by Paul Kingsnorth
- The Sandman: The Wake, a 1995 graphic novel
- Wake (newspaper), operated by the Abraxas Foundation

=== Games ===
- Alan Wake, a 2010 video game
  - Alan Wake 2, the 2023 video game sequel.

=== Music ===
- Wake (opera), a 2018 opera by Giorgio Battistelli
- The Wake (UK band), a post-punk band
- The Wake (American band), a gothic rock band
- Wake (Dead Can Dance album), 2003
- Wake (Floater album), 2010
- Wake (Mortal album), 1994
- Wake (Tara MacLean album), 2008
- Wake (Trio Töykeät album), 2005
- Wake (Lycia album), 1989
- Wake (For Today album), 2015
- The Wake (IQ album), 1985
- The Wake (Scott Kelly album), 2008
- The Wake (Voivod album), 2018
- "Wake", a song by Linkin Park from Minutes to Midnight, 2006

== Places and schools ==
- Wake, Okayama, Japan
- Wake, Virginia, U.S.
- Wake County, North Carolina, U.S.
- Wake Forest, North Carolina, U.S.
- Wake Forest University, Winston-Salem, North Carolina, U.S.
  - Wake Forest Demon Deacons, this school's athletic program
- Wake Island, in the Pacific Ocean
- Bade Airport, the airport in Papua, Indonesia, assigned ICAO code WAKE

== Science ==
- WAKE (cipher), a stream cipher
- Wake (physics), the region of recirculating flow immediately behind a moving solid body
- Wake low, a meteorological phenomenon which can cause high winds
- Wake-on-LAN, a signal that activates a device via a network connection
- Wake-on-ring, or Wake-on-Modem (WOM), a signal that activates a device via a telephone connection
- Wake turbulence, the air turbulence that forms around and behind an aircraft
- Wake, a group of vultures

== Other uses ==
- WAKE (AM), radio station in Indiana, United States
- Wake (sculpture), a 2004 weathering steel sculpture by Richard Serra
- Wake (surname)
- USS Wake, the only U.S. ship to surrender in World War II.

== See also ==
- Awaken (disambiguation)
