= Deer Island (New Brunswick) =

Island in New Brunswick, Canada

Coordinates: 44°58′32.4″N 66°58′53.6″W

Native name: Eduki‑m‑minik Nickname: Masterpiece of the Picture Province Little Scotland of the Maritimes
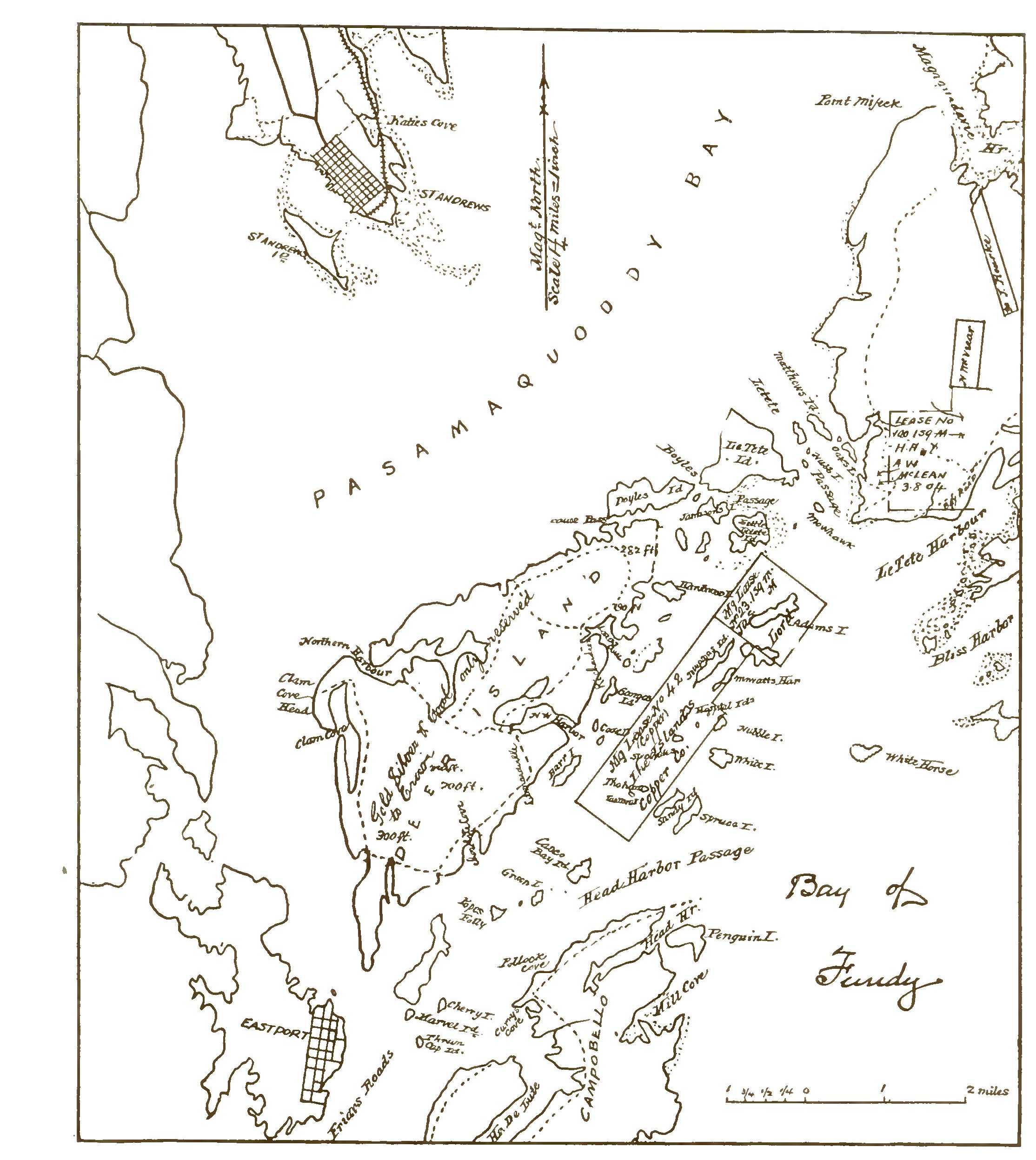
- A 1908 map showing Deer Island.
- Interactive map of Deer Island

Geography
- Location: Bay of Fundy
- Highest elevation: 30 m (100 ft)

Administration
- Canada
- Province: New Brunswick
- County: Charlotte County

Demographics
- Population: 718 (2021)

Deer Island is one of the Fundy Islands at the entrance to Passamaquoddy Bay in the Bay of Fundy, Canada. Settled in the 18th century primarily by Loyalists fleeing the United States, it remains a fishing settlement built around fishing, aquaculture, herring weirs and lobster pounds. The Old Sow tidal whirlpool, the largest in the western hemisphere, is off its southern coast.

Although it has only a third the population it had before the 1950s, the "quiet and reposeful" Deer Island is the main centre of West Isles Parish and falls under the Southwest NB Regional Service Commission.

== History ==
=== Early Settlement ===
There are "traces" of visits to the island by indigenous Passamaquoddys, although there was no known settlement by either the natives while a 1733 map by Cyprian Southack suggested there may have been French homes built at one time on the southern tip of Deer Island.

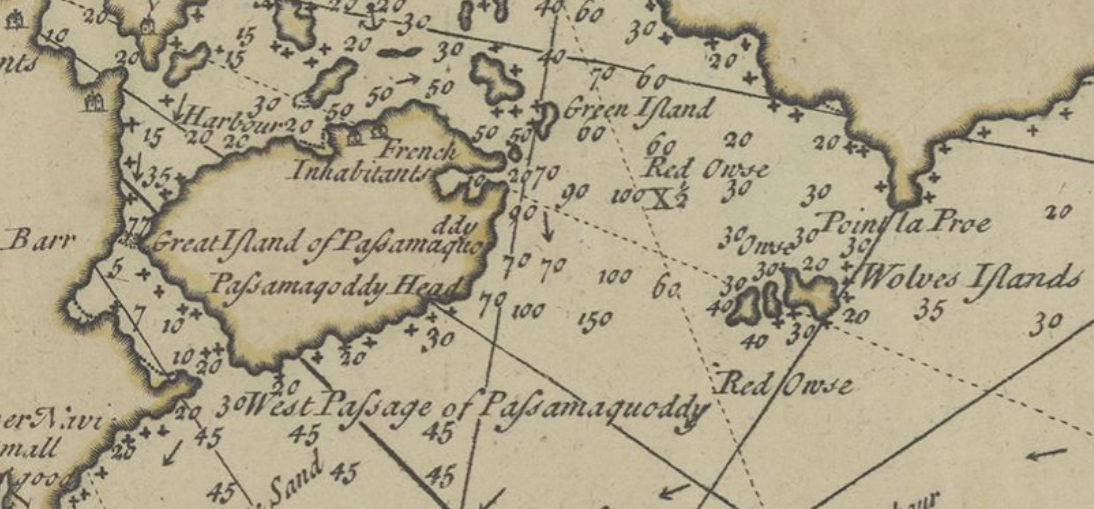
A 1733 map showing Campobello and Deer Island believed to be a single island.

In 1604, Samuel de Champlain noted that a crewmember, Mssr. Poutrincourt, had almost become lost on the island.

The origin of the name is attributed to either following Estêvão Gomes' 1525 naming of Penobscot River as "Deer River" or to a Passamaquoddy legend about the island being a deer chased by wolves represented by the Wolf Islands. The name "Deer Island" is found on the 1764 Mitchell's Fieldbook, and the Passamaquoddy name is presumed to be a translation of the English. The natives referred to the lower end of the island as "Peelsquess", "girl", for the shape of a rock in the water.

Until the end of the French and Indian Wars in 1760, it was not considered safe for English families to settle in the region due to the French influence over the natives since at least 1704 when the Le Treille family settled Indian Island, after Cardinal Richelieu granted the region to the care of Isaac de Razilly. At this time, Col. Gorham and Col. Benjamin Church were sent to Indian Island to raid the natives and guard over the Le Treille family.

In 1762 the colony of Massachusetts, and in 1767 the colony of Nova Scotia, began cautiously settling the area as the Passamaquoddy were now friendly and open to trade. In 1765, both Campobello and Deer Island were granted by the Crown to the Canada Company.

Josiah Heney, John Frost, Alexander Hodges and James Parsons were among the first Loyalist settlers in 1763, building homes near Pleasant Point although legally squatters without title. In 1964, Reginald Richardson was scuba-diving and discovered the wreck of an unidentified colony ship with its cannonade, wine and anchor near the Sandy Island ledges off Deer Island, dated between 1770-1790, which Cyril Moore prepared for the New Brunswick Museum.

The British considered Deer Island's geography to be easily defended against possible American hostility, but to lack a deep-water harbour suitable for shipping.

The government assigned formal ownership of Deer Island to Joseph William Gorham on August 21, 1767, on condition that he settle families there as per an agreement of Dec 2 1766. It was presumed to be influenced by Gorham being the son or grandson of the original Col. Gorham. However Gorham was appointed to command in Newfoundland and unable to keep his pledge to settle and oversee the island, so agreed on February 3, 1770, to sell the island to another officer, Thomas Farrell for 470 pounds sterling. Here, ownership became more murky and the subject of legal battles, and Farrell was also granted timberland on the Digdeguash which went undeveloped. Meanwhile Gorham was tasked with the Two Sisters ship in the 1783 evacuation of the Second Fleet of New York to Saint John.

Farrell led a multifaceted life, gifting land and selling cheaply on the island to families that would settle there - regaling them with tales of his marriage to a Lady-in-Waiting to Queen Charlotte, his duels and time in battle as a British lieutenant. Farrell said he had served as an ensign under Gnl. Edward Braddock at the Battle of Fort Duquesne.

Six months after signing the purchase of Deer Island from Gorham, Farrell listed his Montreal property for sale and in later claimed to have relocated to Deer Island as his "general residence" by 1772 although again it is contested as he was not listed among residents when the government surveyed all early settlers to ascertain which local river had been commonly named St. Croix to settle a boundary dispute. It was later surmised that Farrell had agreed to sell the property on January 21, 1778, to an American, Thomas Macdonald Reed of North Carolina, for the same 470 pounds sterling he'd paid himself as Farrell was himself heading to the United States to take up arms against the British as part of the American Revolution.

In autumn 1771, Captain Owen's ship Campobello Packet stopped at Cranberry Island, where his pilot Aaron Bunker "found his maiden sister bundled abed with the son of rather a wealthy settler on Deer Island [and] swore he would cut the gallant's throat if he did not repair the honour of the family by marrying his sister", leading Captain Owen to bring Eliachim Eaton and Mary Bunker to Indian Island where he had jurisdiction to marry them immediately.

In 1783, John Rolf, his widowed daughter and six grandchildren moved to Deer Island. Soon his daughter married John Fountain, who had previously spent nine years on Indian Island with his son and daughter. Other loyalist settlers include John Appleby who settled in Chocolate Cove, Obediah Clarke who founded Clarke's Point at Northwest Harbour, and the Dow family. Richardsonville was founded by Isaac Richardson, who had fought alongside Gnl. Wolfe in Quebec. George Cline of Maine had been a sergeant during the Revolutionary War and died on Bar Island. In 1809 Joseph Conley moved to the island and later piloted the ship HMS Terror in the War of 1812, prior to its later calamity. Daniel Lambert spent his post-Revolution time between Portsmouth, New Hampshire and Deer Island, founding Lambert's Cove. Jonathan Stover was granted 25 prior to 1786 after being part of a major 1784 sawmill on the mainland. Guss Stover ran a grocery business downhill from the Fairhaven Methodist Church, and his brother John W. Stover raised three sons and a daughter in Fairhaven towards Cummings Cove. Robert Pagan operated two sawmills on the island.

There was a boundary dispute with the United States over ownership of nearly all the Passamaquoddy Islands, which was settled by the 1817 Passamaquoddy Bay Commission which reaffirmed an 1803 commitment that only Moose, Frederick and Dudley Islands would not be British.

Thomas Farrell re-settled in New Brunswick post-Revolution, as the southwest corner of the province was notably fluid in its allegiance between the two nations and not concerned with his American service, seeking to have Deer Island re-granted to him and not gifted in title to a number of local families now petitioning the government for relief. He claimed that Reed had never paid him in full before his death, so the earlier sale was null - and that he had been unaware of any obligation to register his initial purchase from Gorham for which he could produce the uncontested papers. Complicating matters in 1789, Reed's surviving son David unsuccessfully filed suit claiming ownership of his late father's island and another claimant Patrick McMaster claimed to have paid 168 out of 500 pounds sterling due to purchase it from Reed before the latter's death in a tavern. Patrick Flinn held in 1805 that he'd been undisturbed as a squatter improving a family farm and controlling Bar Island since the 1780s, other than a brief period a Thomas Doyle had spent a season building a fishing camp on the southern tip which Flinn later sold to Warren Hathaway, claiming at no time did Thomas Farrell play any role on Bar Island. Farrell's neighbours on the island did not participate in the lawsuit seeking title deeds, while 22 others largely led by Patrick Flinn, including boys not yet adults, collectively sought 200 acres apiece guided by lawyer Ward Chipman including ironically threatening that if not granted title deeds by the British government in Canada they would remove themselves to the United States and swear loyalty there - while still seeking to impress upon the Crown Farrell's disloyalty in having done the same. However, since his return Farrell had now been named a captain in the Charlotte County Militia, and was promoted to major in January 1805 re-affirming his loyalty back to British Canada.

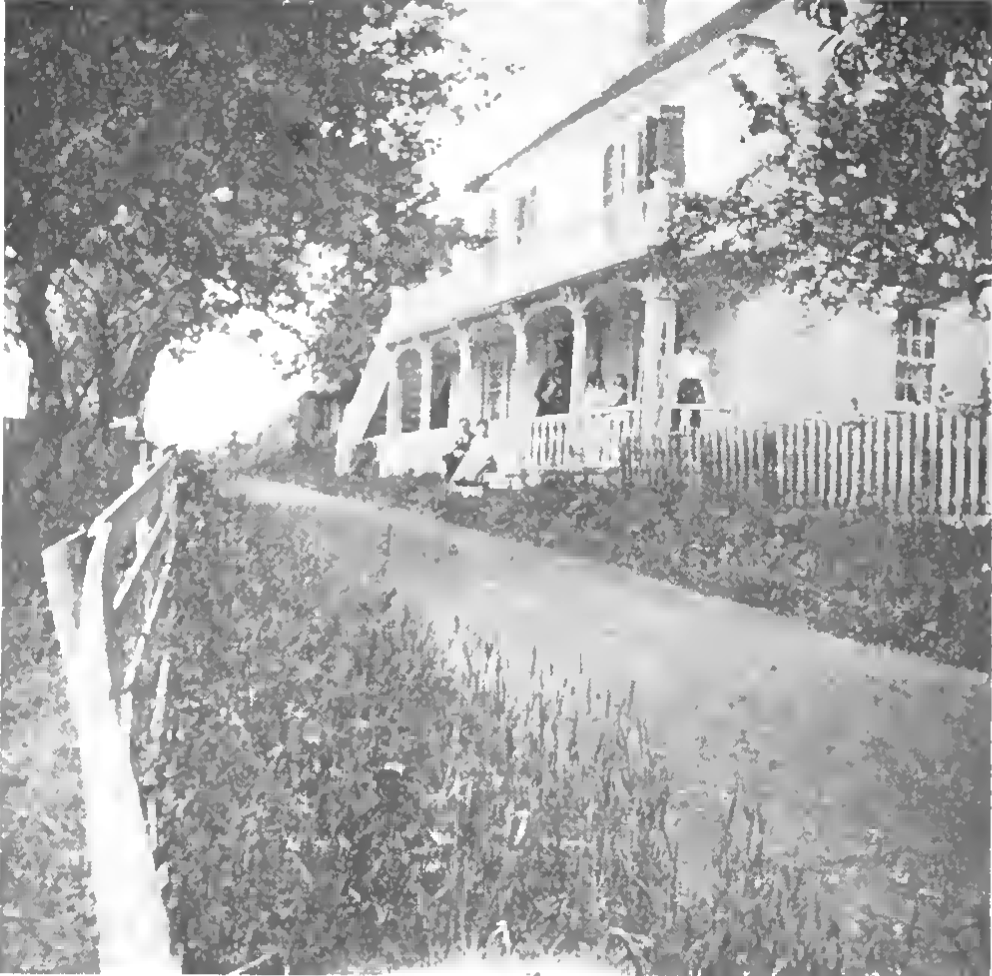
The former Garrison House near Chocolate Cove, built by the family of William Lloyd Garrison whose mother Fanny was from Deer Island and cast out by her father after abandoning Anglicanism for the new Baptist church, and later tutored the family of Capt. John Shackford in Maine.

Ultimately the government re-granted the land back to Thomas Farrell in 1810, denying the families' petitions - leading author Martha Barto to surmise it may have been to protect the large tracts of land held by lumber and shipping magnates in St. Andrews on the mainland, as non-petitioners, John Wilson, Thomas Wyer, Dr. John Calef, Robert and William Pagan each had a vested interest in Farrell retaining ownership. Farrell was noted to attend prominent balls in St. Andrews while wearing a tricorn, and the Pagans were listed as his trusted friends in his final will. On one occasion he travelled to Fredericton with the intent of challenging MLA Nathan Frink to a duel, as was his custom. The re-grant noted that the island comprised approximately 6,300 acres - of which 4,000 acres were unsold - recognising the sales and gifts Farrell had given over the years. Farrell built a frame house at Chocolate Cove in what is today known as Roscoe McNeill's field across from Ron Fountain's summer house.

In 1821, 35 petitioners on the island again brought an unsuccessful suit to the government seeking title deeds to award them each land on the island in view of having lived on the island for decades. In 1822, Thomas Farrell died and was buried on Haskins Head on the property of Herman Creamer, in an unmarked grave having renounced such worldly objects in his religious fervour. His sword passed through hands to Viola Calder of Fairhaven. His will assigned half his estate to his youngest and favourite child Sophia, and half his estate to be shared between his son George and other daughter Isabella Fitzherbert - none of whom had ever been to the island. In 1831, George Farrell deeded his portion to his sisters. This led to the sale of the lands on Deer Island for approximately 1,000 pounds sterling, allowing settled families to finally obtain legal title.

In 1822, brothers Coburn Leonard Cummings and William Cummings built a shipyard which became Cummings Cove, although it ceased production by 1850 or 1876. In 1850, Richardson and Son Boat Building began constructing fishing boats and built more than a thousand boats by its close in 1965. The site was added to the Canadian Register of Historic Places in 1999. By 1875, the Butler Brothers also had a shipbuilding yard rivaling Richardson's.

Ultimately the northern half of the island was largely settled and populated by Loyalist families and a few British immigrants, while the southern half of the island was settled and populated by American families.

=== Heyday of the mid-to-late 19th century ===
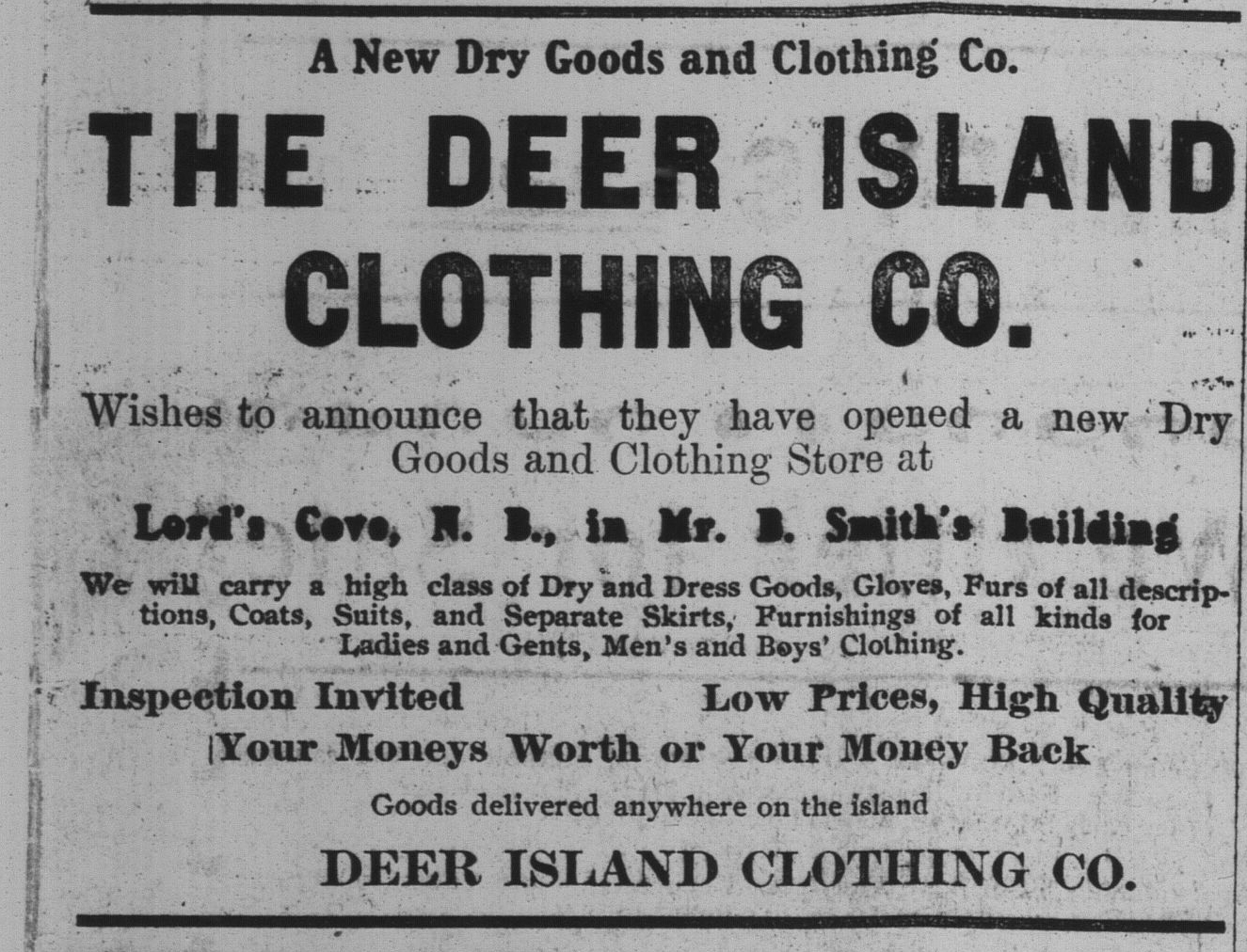
A newsprint advertisement.

In 1866, in response to the ongoing Fenian Raids meant to destabilise and drain British forces which resulted in a brief paramilitary venture to seize Campobello, the 3rd Battalion of Charlotte County Militia were stationed on Deer Island although primarily overseen by those from Grand Manan. Their uniform in 1867 was a scarlet tunic with yellow facings and navy blue trousers. The Clinch, Chaffey, Fountain and Leonard families were all represented within its ranks.

The first waterwheel on the island was operated by the Leemans near Lord's Cove, although a more important tidal mill was built in Mill Cove.

In September 1869 a large fire tore through the barn, harnesses, wagons and ten tons of hay that belonged to Captain Walter Calder, while he was away in PEI. In October 1869, the Saxby Gale destroyed the Deer Island schooner Echo, with three men drowned and destroyed a vast wharf infrastructure that covered much of the Leonardville harbour in a complex of buildings, sheds, and smokehouses; the area never recovered to the industry it had been prior to the storm. In 1870, Moss Rose Hall was built near Chocolate Cove from the lumber salvaged from the Saxby Gale, as a dual-purpose school and entertainment centre. In 1875 it was described as "most artistically frescoed; evincing a refinement and taste for the beautiful".

In 1873, the island's first Lobster Cannery opened - it later developed the world's largest lobster pound holding up to a million pounds of live lobster near Kalamee's Crick.

In 1874, Charles Dudley Warner advocated that the United States seize Deer Island and Campobello by force, to the point of war if necessary - to ensure Canada was not used against the United States. By 1875, T.K. Parker and J.M. Lord ran large herring smokehouses, and also produced pumice fertilizer.

In 1879, George Leonard opened a herring smokeshop and within a decade there were 40 smoked fish businesses on the island - chiefly selling to Maine.

As of 1898, the island's businesses were listed as general shops run by Arthur Barteau, Jamesm Cline, Charles and Frank Lambert, Edwin McNeil, Nettie Poland, FW, GE and Winslow Richardson and GH Smith - as well as Seth Johnson's blacksmithing, James Hadden's coal, AA Westmore and JA Greenlaw's sardines, John Welch's lobster.

=== 20th and 21st centuries ===
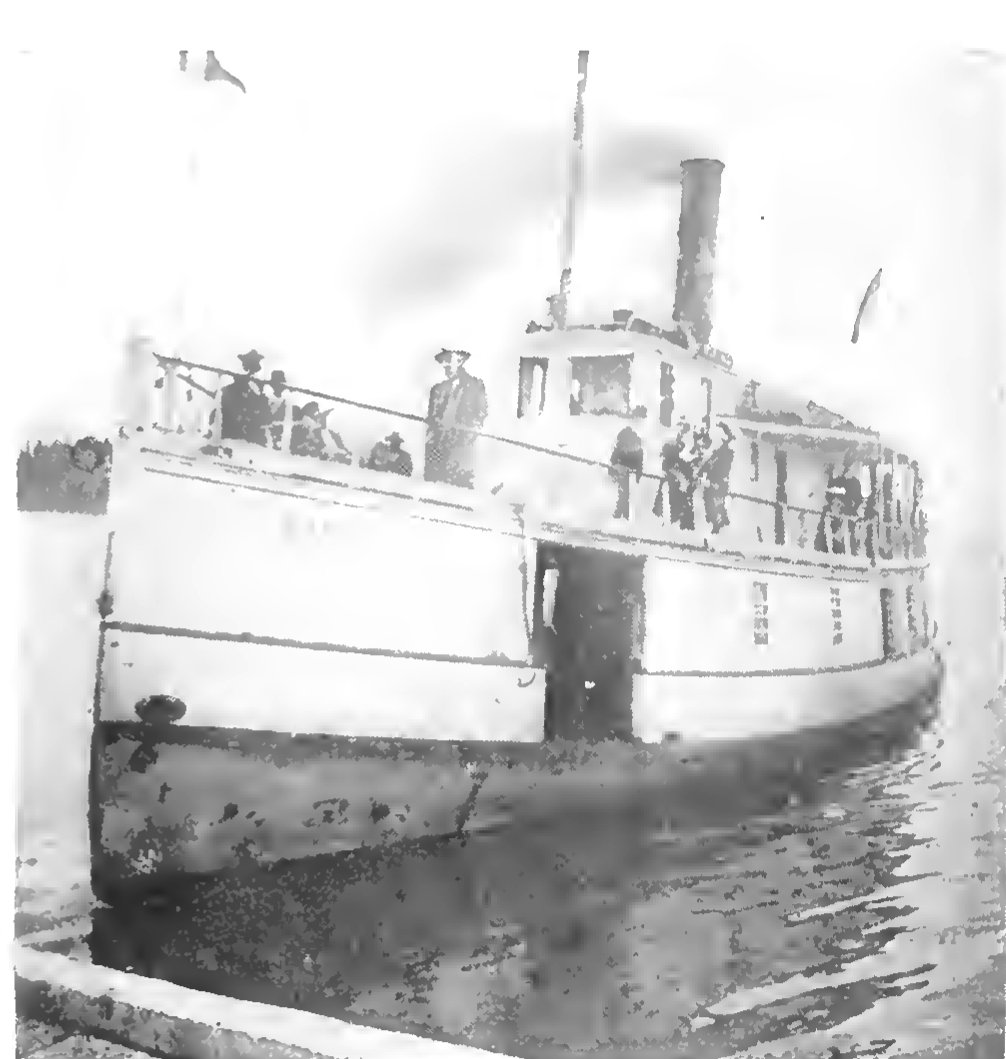
The steamship Viking, assisted by the SS Arbutus, began transporting passengers, mail and freight to Deer Island in 1896. Captained at a time by Frank Johnson, who leapt off the ship to save Blanche Stuart of Lord's Cove from drowning.

The island was not easily reached except by those with private boats, until 1900 when the Deer Island and Campobello Steamboat Co. Ltd had its steamship Viking begin taking passengers from the mainland to Leonardville, after which the Grand Manan and the Connors Bros also made regular weekly stops at the island. By the 1920s, a 65' sloop dubbed the Rex Mailboat was the first ship to bring mail six days a week, captained by Herbert Calder. Each day it would stop at Lord's Cove, Richardson, Leonardville and Chocolate Cove before departing for Campobello, Eastport, back to Deer Island's Cummings Cove, before ending at St. Andrews. Notable guests to attend the island formally included governors-general Freeman Thomas Willingden and Vincent Massey, as well as William Lyon Mackenzie King. In 1932, Senator Cairine Wilson had written to Prime Minister King about her visit to Deer Island, and gifted him a commemorative egg cup.

After the Boer War, accomplished sportsman Arnie Arneson started a West Isles Volunteer Rifle Association which practised with .303 Lee-Enfields in Seward Welch's field and at Cumming's Cove, as a reserve militia unit.

In 1903, island residents formed a joint stock company, the West Isles Telephone Company Ltd, and sold 400 shares at $5 apiece, then connected the island by telephone and within a year connected to the telephone exchange in Eastport, Maine. It was expanded in 1915, and taken over by the NB Telephone Company in 1953. In the 1920s, when Grace Helen Mowat was gaining fame in St. Andrews for her Cottage Craft wares, she employed Deer Island residents Floyd Doughty and James Stuart to operate the pottery wheel and kiln. Flora C. Fountain left Cummings Cove and spent thirty years teaching with the Perkins Institute for the Blind. By 1910, there was a baseball team dubbed the Cresants of Lords Cove which would play against Lubec, Maine. By 1970, an amateur ice hockey team called the Islanders was playing against teams on the mainland. In the 1911 Canadian federal election, Dow Grass of Deer Island was arrested for tampering with ballot boxes leading to the Sunbury—Queen's riding's invalidation of results.

In 1913, Hartley Wentworth and Frank Macdonald started a Fairhaven oil refining business "Swift Tide Oil" collecting waste oil from the ten sardine factories operating on the island, refined it and sold it to the St. Croix Soap Company. Twenty years later, Wentworth patented a children's vitamin tablet with Ganong combining fish liver with chocolate. In July 1915, the number of automobiles on the island doubled as Edward Morissey, G.B. Stuart and Will Welsh each brought over their new purchases. Vernon Stuart owned two light aeroplanes which he flew from Deer Island to Grand Manan, until abandoning the hobby after crashing on a Grand Manan beach. In 1914, island fishers began harvesting scallops for the first time.

In July 1921 a fire destroyed much of the forest southeast of Fairhaven. Fairhaven got its name from Grace Helen Mowat seeking a more pleasant name for the F.W. Farris & Sons sardine cannery.

In 1925, James S. Lord became the first island resident to reach provincial legislature as the representative for Charlotte County; he was also a key figure in the Ku Klux Klan's operations in Atlantic Canada.

In 1928, the Bremen flight became the first to cross the Atlantic from Europe to North America flying over Deer Island before its crash landing in Quebec. On the return flight of its three crewmen, heavy fog required them to set down their amphibious plane just off the shore of Richardson boathouse.

On April 9, 1931, it was reported that an earthquake had struck the region just as one had been recorded on Deer Island and Campobello January 26, 1897 but within a day it was reported to have actually been a large explosion of dynamite on Deer Island.

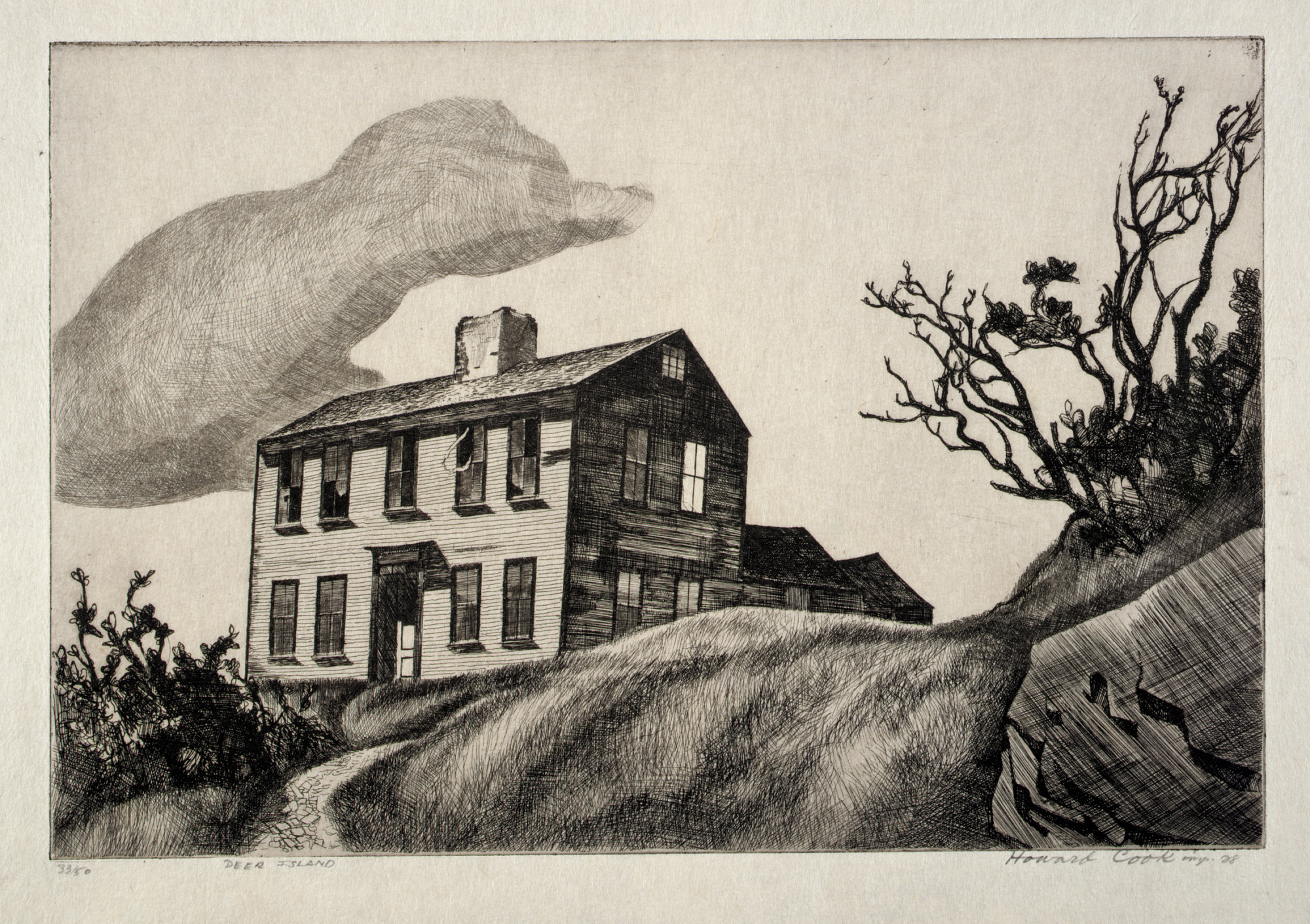
A 1928 etching by Howard Cook, of a home on Deer Island.

In World War II, a German U-boat had placed a German espionage agent into Atlantic Canada having dropped, and later retrieved, him at Northwest Harbour on Deer Island where the ship had been spotted by Osgood Leslie.

The primary source of electricity was Richardson's shipyard's generator until 1938 when connection was made to the mainland. A blacksmith operation by Edward Gardener, and a shop, were situated in Richardson.

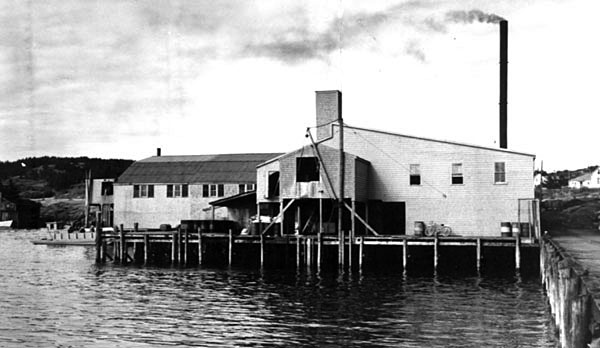
A sardine canning factory on Deer Island, 1940, similar to those described by H.W. Welch

By 1945, Conley's Lobster on the island claimed to be the world's largest independent lobster shipper, accounting for 15% of all Canadian lobster.

In 1959, R. Greenlaw opened the 200-seat Mayfair Theatre at Chocolate Cove, but operated only four years. The Quoddy Tides newspaper was initially typeset on Deer Island in the 1960s, with material then being sent on fishing boats to Eastport, Maine for final production. At this time, Deer Island also had a 50-member band that played through the region.

From 1962 to 1966, there existed a "Deer Island Development Association" which included AP Cummings and Martha Barto which published "Historical Sketch of Deer Island" and "Deer island, New Brunswick, Canada".

In 1973, residents formed the "Fundy Weir Fisherman's Association", pressuring government to end the new purse seine ships and fish meal industries that led to overfishing. In 1978, the Department of Fisheries established experimental Salmon aquaculture sites on Deer Island, and through the 1980s aquaculture grew to replace some of the traditional fishing businesses. The 1993 closure of the sardine factory in Fairhaven left 20% of the island unemployed. An influx of Newfoundlanders moved to the island, driven by the cod moratorium and closing paper mills in their home province.

In 2018, the largest employer on the island, Paturel's lobster-processing plant, burned down. In 2023, the island made national headlines when residents relied on "significant and surprising" community vigilantism "taking policing matters into their own hands", leading to RCMP comments that Deer Island appeared as a "lawless community" as part of a "long history of vigilante justice in Southwest New Brunswick" including the year before in McAdam.

=== History of Agriculture ===
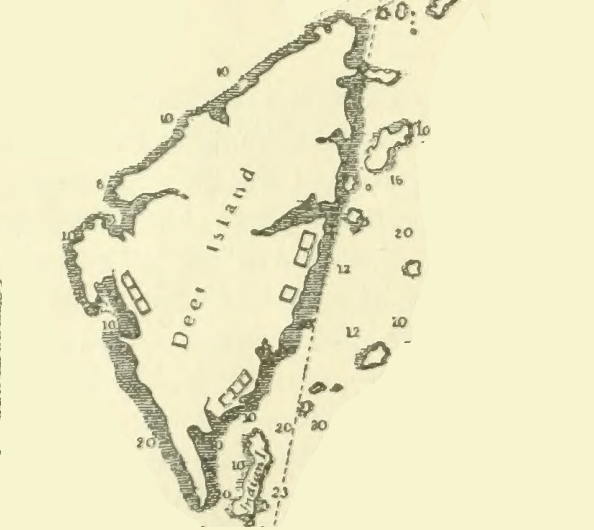
Deer Island, from the 1810 survey by Benjamin R. Jones

The island's soil is listed as ideal for potatoes, oats and vegetables, although elsewhere derided as largely sterile. Squire James Ward built a dam across the waters between English Bar and Hersonville to harvest marsh cranberries.

In 1851, residents were producing moderate amounts of hay, turnips and potatoes while holding 240 milk-cows producing 20,000lb of butter, and 971 sheep. By 1861, sheep had increased to 1,500, and there were 920 acres planted with hay, 103 acres with potato, 42 acres with oats, and 196 farmers now outnumbered the 144 fishermen although the latter industry still employed more labourers. There were also nearly 200 barrels of crude oil taken from the island. While oxen were plentiful, it was a matter of note that there were no horses to be found on the island at that time, and later use of a horse by Gus Stover for deliveries was considered peculiar, although they were more common by 1908.

By 1875, Mr. Felix was among those who kept sheep on the island which were kept largely freerange, and Ward Pendleton was likewise focused on agriculture.

By 1960, there was "no farming whatsoever...not a cow, sheep, pig or any other livestock remains" leaving farm goods as a trade deficit for the island. A 1981 study noted "the sole manifestation of what was relatively extensive farming in the West isles during the last century are open fields on Deer Island which today are gradually being over grown.".

=== History of Religion ===
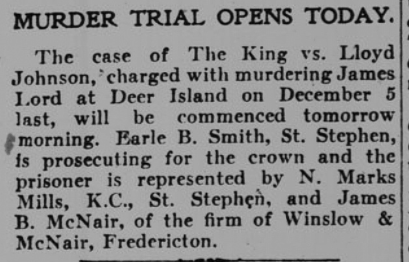
Lloyd Johnson was acquitted of murder after shooting James Linwood Lord in an early-morning drunken altercation on Trecartens Hill in Lords Cove in December 1925. Lord had signed a deathbed statement that Johnson didn't deserve the blame, and brothers Charles and Hazen Lord testified to witnessing the gun go off accidentally when Lord lunged at Johnson when provoked. Johnson noted he'd gone to Richardson's Store and drank two bottles of liquor with the brothers before arranging a doctor and boat to the hospital where Lord later died.

In 1825, an auxiliary "Indian Island and Deer Island Bible Society" was formed.

In June 1828, missionary Nancy Towle (associated with The Awakening's Christian Connexion radical non-doctrinal reformism) spent three days on Deer Island and won fifty converts. Also in 1828, Samuel Landmaid donated land in Chocolate Cove for John Warren Apple to begin construction of the First Christian Church of Chocolate Cove, later named the Free Baptist Church.

In 1846, Rev. Harry Leigh Yewens was sent to Campobello and Deer Islanda where he spent three years as a catechist and teacher.

In 1848, an article was published in the Christian Visitor noting the failure of Christian missions to establish any church at all on Deer Island, which was rebutted by islanders who countered that they were largely living as Campbellites and simply lacked formal services. On September 13, 1850, Lord's Cove became the first Church of Christ congregation to survive in New Brunswick after an abortive 1834 attempt in Saint John. Lords Cove was led by J.A. Lord, editor of the Christian Standard, and had 17 members. The church was built in 1853, and outreach built a second church in Leonardville in 1858. By 1861, 1,010 of the island's 1,334 residents claimed allegiance to the church.

The island was historically a dry county, as Farrell had himself been a prohibitionist for the last thirty years of his life, during which he became devoutly religious and fond of the Old Testament, forbidding the sale of alcohol even outside Prohibition, with author John Lorimer noting in 1876 "No license for rum-selling goes from Deer Island into the county treasure box. Prohibition is hers. The flag of total abstinence waves proudly over her rocky hills and verdant valleys. Deer Island has set an example to her sister isles worthy of all imitation", and predicting Deer Island would excel above the rest of the region due to its stance.

Nonetheless, a private whiskey still operated in Fairhaven, and later Harry Richardson ceased his mercantile trade with Saint Pierre and Miquelon to smuggle alcohol until caught in 1932 at Mowat Island with "510 gallons of alcohol and 80 gallons of rye on-board" and his ship, the Ada May, was seized.

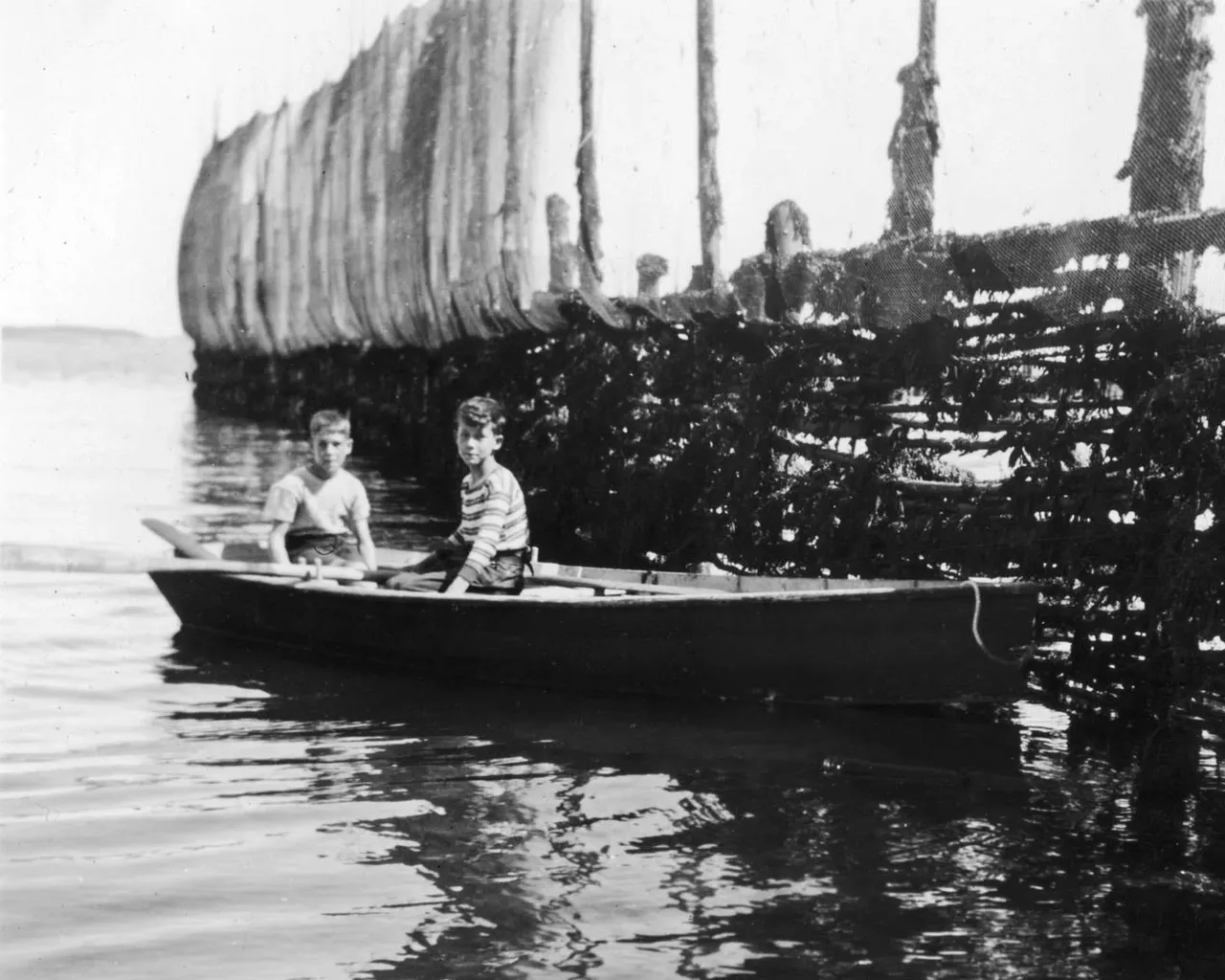
Boys attending a fishing weir off Deer Island, 1949

A government investigation of the state of the Fundy fisheries in 1851 further noted "the Sons of Temperance had greatly improved conditions of these [Deer] Islanders". In 1874, the International Organisation of Good Templars abstinence fraternal order held its annual meeting in Lords Cove, Deer Island.

As of 1876, a second Church of Christ was planted at Bar Island Harbour, with Free Will Baptist and short-lived Methodist churches elsewhere on the island. The Free Will Baptist Church had a quarrel with the Orange Order which denounced its puritanical prohibition on alcohol and tobacco, which led an unwelcoming environment that kept out Orangemen and Freemasons for over a century.

As of 1876, there were 800 members of the Churches of Christ, 646 Baptists, 74 Anglicans, 111 Methodist, 9 Catholics and 6 Adventists, as well as 15 professing no religion. From 1874-1906, the Methodist church attempted to plant a seed of Arminian doctrine making repeated efforts to build a congregation on Deer Island, but never succeeded.

In 1984, a Masonic Lodge Abnaki #55 was chartered on the island following the efforts of Frank Langley.

Myer Lord lived in Northern Harbour, with his wife Eunice, and claimed to be a faith healer by right of being the seventh son of a seventh son.

In 1962, local churches jointly opened the Bayview Children's Camp which continues to operate.

A financial endowment by Gerald Simpson of Fairhaven has allowed Acadia University to offer annual lectures on religion through their divinity college since 1979.

=== History of Smuggling ===
"Maine law is constantly evaded....[a] sailor has only to step into a boat and give it a shove or two across the narrow stream that separates the United States from Deer Island...and return before he is missed".

— Charles Dudley Warner, 1857

From its first settlement, Deer Island proved to be a haven for smugglers, which over the years has seen flourishing trades in fish, alcohol, lumber, flour, plaster and other embargoed goods. The Loyalist George Leonard was originally put in charge of the suppression of smuggling on the Fundy Isles, which at the time was largely coordinated by David Owen "who professed that to believe that he was, by condition of his grant, exempt from the operation of New Brunswick law.". Tea-chests and American goods were smuggled into New Brunswick. Sgt. Leonard "declared open war on the illicit trade of the islands" in 1798. He settled on 25 acres on Deer Island in 1801, where he remained until his death. Owen, who served as a justice of the peace, wrote to judge Edward Winslow in 1802, noting his concern that "the influx of strangers...on Deer Island they have actually defied the proprietor Capt. Farrell and built habitations. On one or two islands are houses erected by these aliens...[we may] prevent their smuggling to our great injury". Historian Joshua Smith has noted the prevalence of smuggling based on the islands, noting "the more government forces attempted to halt unregulated trade, the more apparent it became to locals that the state was an unwelcomed and alien force".

At times, errors were made and ships were seized on the wrong side of the border, with patrols complaining that the region's fog made it impossible to tell which side of the boundary they may find themselves. This led to the 1808 American military incursion into British waters, wrongly seizing a ship loaded with flour just off the coast of Deer Island well within Canadian waters causing Lord Erskine to demand apology from US president James Madison. 1870 and 1920 were identified as the greatest eras of smuggling for Deer Island.

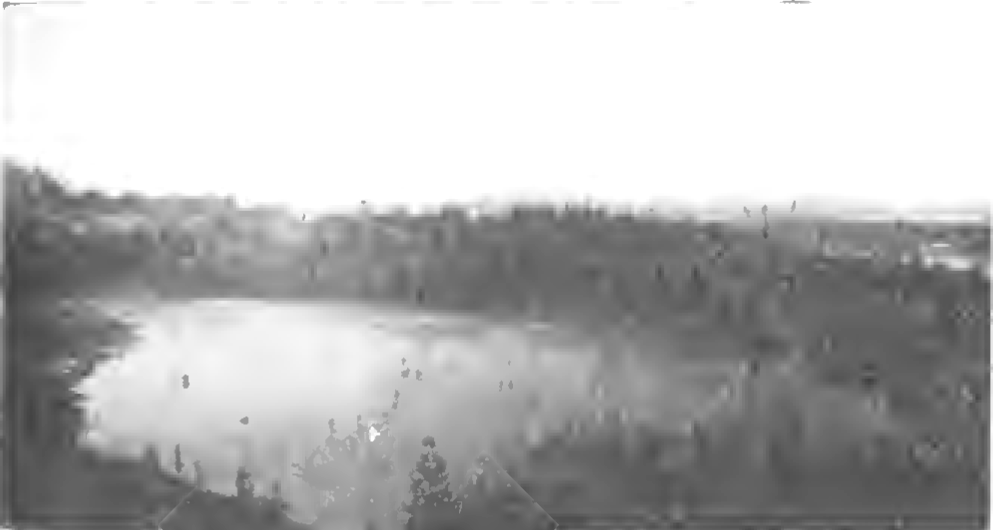
There are two inland freshwater ponds, including Little Meadow Pond; speckled trout may be caught in its brooks. Big Meadow Pond is also known as Johnson's Pond.

In 1886, after a fishing treaty was abrogated, Deer Island fishermen brought their boats to Eastport, Maine and paid the US duties to make them American boats with Canadian owners which would allow them to sell sardines to the USA without paying Canadian export tariffs. The Canadian government seized twenty-two boats and fined the owners $2500 (equal to $85,000 in 2025) for "smuggling" their own boats. US Customs decried the seizure, pointing out that many of the Deer Island fishermen held dual citizenship as "double-enders" and every right to register their boats in the US to be able to sell in US market, noting further that it was impoverishing their families to be held to rigid interpretations meant to constrain corporate ships over 5 tonnes and not private fishermen. The Daily Sun published a letter that "While we sympathize with the fishermen of Deer Island, we cannot hope that they will at any time under any government or tariff, be able to violate the law with impunity." US Customs collector Nutt spoke to Canadian Customs agent J.D. Bonnes, later recounting "By this rigid interpretation of the law, he made them out smugglers. I told him that a government which would do this thing to these poor men, living under its own flag, was not fit to exist. Bonnes is to Canada what special customs officers were to [the United States] under the worst phases of the old moiety system. He gets a large commission on whatever he confiscated, he is a robber and nothing less."

In 1886, the Boston Globe wrote a series of articles calling the residents of Deer Island, Campobello and Grand Manan "pirates", alleging they had plundered American goods at Eastport.

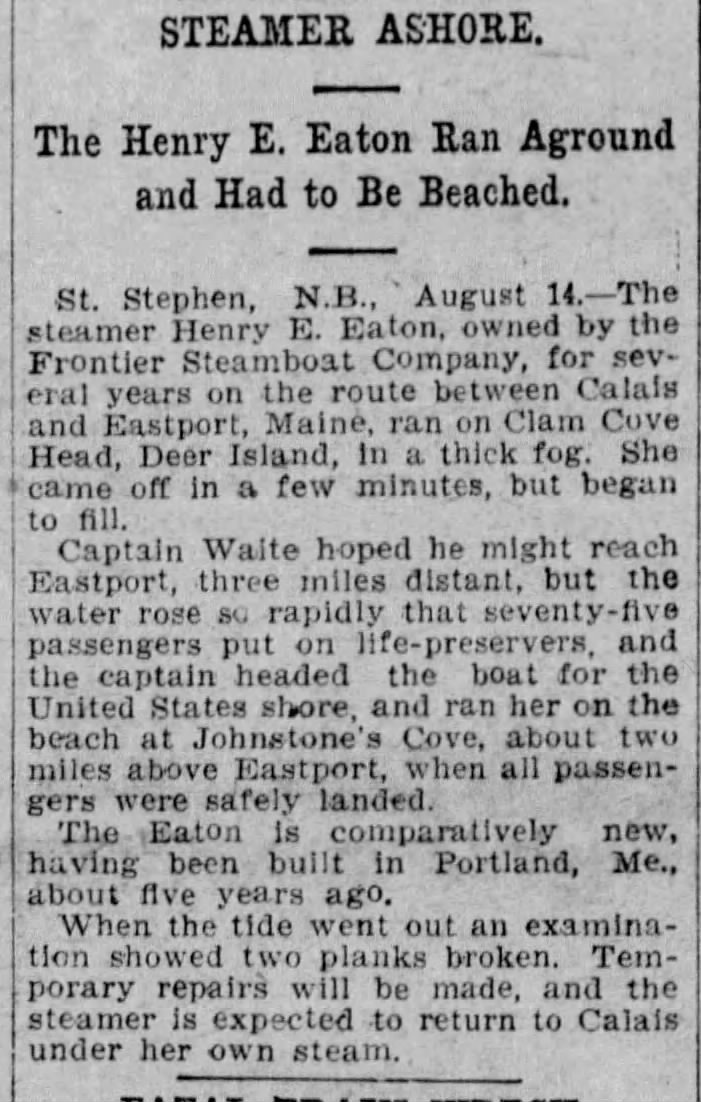
1908 newspaper clipping about a steamboat running aground at Clam Cove, Deer Island

Smuggling continued during the rationing of the World Wars. A Deer Island tale offers how A. Wesley Stuart "was smart enough" to ask his mother to falsely tell him that he was born in Bangor, Maine - and when he was arrested for crossing the international boundary with a load of sardines, he was asked to swear to being an American and honestly answered "Now just a minute, there's no living person on earth that can swear where he was born - that I can't do. But I'll swear that my mother told me I was.". In 1951, Stuart made headlines for his defence of free trade as a Member of Parliament, noting he had been a smuggler all his life, and explaining "An electric refrigerator sells for $225, if you walk across the little bridge to the other side it sells for $460...I never came through [the border] in my lifetime that I did not smuggle something. I feel it is a right.". This may have contributed to his colleagues dubbing him a "dim-witted foul-mouthed saboteur".

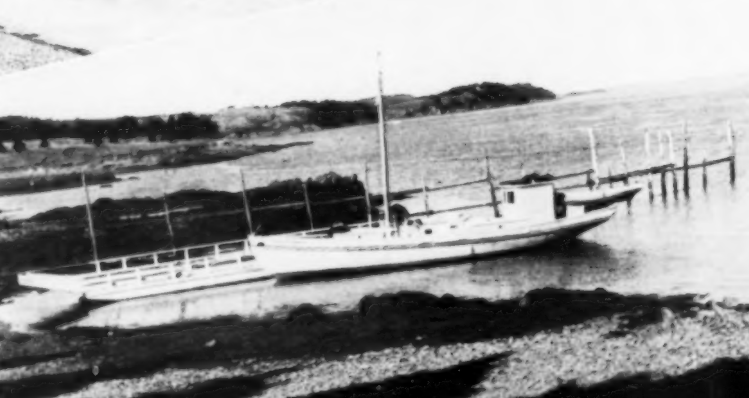
The 1941 ferry to Eastport, Maine - resting at Deer Island Point

Poaching has also been a traditional activity on the island, with the game warden assigned to the island in 1927 noting that "illegal" deer hunting was obviously rampant and he'd failed to sell a single hunting license and questioned the wisdom of even operating on the island. In 1958, a federal Ministry of Fisheries patrol boat "Alosa" was moored at Lord's Cove while investigating potentially illegal lobster traps, when "some unknown fired a shotgun burst at close range into the boat and motor".

In the 2020s, deer hunters continue to report higher rates of success on Deer Island and Grand Manan than anywhere else in the province.

== Demographics ==
The 1803 census found Deer Island contained 32 men, 30 women and 55 children for a total population of 117. The 1840 census found 1,225 residents in addition to two "persons of colour" and another 200 men absent on ocean voyages. The 1851 census found 1,252 residents and five schools on the island, in addition to four churches, two sawmills, and five handmills. In 1871 there were 1,556 residents and 23 fishing vessels on the island alongside 208 smaller boats.

In 1881, the census determined there were 332 families in 286 houses, for a total population of 1,661. Of these, 1,446 identified as English, 129 Irish, 55 Scottish, 20 French, 4 Dutch, 1 German and 1 Russian.

As of 1908, there were 43 houses and a Customs Housed in Leonardville.

In 2016, census showed 797 residents which fell to 718 in 2021 with 344 of 475 houses occupied. As of 2021, there were 125 children on the island, and 200 seniors aged 65+. The average number of children among families with children was 1.8. 21% of households had a mortgage, and the average monthly rental cost was $580. 410 individuals were marked as Christian, 325 as "No religion".

Deer Island federal election results
Year	Conservative		Liberal		Green		New Democratic		Libertarian	
2025 - 351 votes	65.2%	229	30%	105	0.6%	2	2.8%	10	0.3%	1

Deer Island provincial election results
Year	PC		Liberal		Green		NDP		CNBP		Libertarian	
2024 - 325 votes	59.7%	194	32.6%	106	4%	13	1.8%	6	1.8%	6	0%	0

== Geography ==
Situated exactly halfway between the Equator and North Pole, the 45th line of parallel passes through Deer Island just above Johnson's Lake. The island is covered in pine trees, and wildlife includes partridges, rabbits, waterfowl and historically foxes which were later eradicated to protect poultry flocks although a fox farm remained in the 1960s.

Most of its coves are named for historical residents. Floss Island sits inside Clam Cove. In 1941, the Ministry of Fisheries stocked 27 smallmouth bass into Big Meadow Pond along with 9000 cyprinids.

Between Richardson and Lord's Cove is a hill locally known as Daddy Good's Mountain, after the quaint gentleman who used to own the property which offered a fire-scarred peak from which to view the Bay of Fundy. Hannah Dow Hill sits in Leonardville, named for a relative of Stephen Dow of Musquash Island, who became lost and froze to death finding her missing cow in a 4-day snowstorm in the mid-19th century.

There are eight well-sheltered harbours around its irregular coast, including Chocolate Cove, Clam Cove Head and Cummings Cove. Chocolate Cove takes its name from the abundance of Geum canadense which has roots used as a chocolate substitute.

In 1876 there was a store at Cummings Cove, another at Bar Island, another at Fairhaven and two at Lord's Cove although mercantile trade was also operated out of private homes, and by 1908 there were two general stores in Leonardville. Following his father's success, a son of Grand Manan's John Cook opened a satellite lobster factory on Deer Island but it soon faltered. Although there was a single post office at Cummings Cove in 1868, it served only a quarter of the island and, as late as 1870, Wealthy Brooks Butler noted most of the island relied on inconsistent monthly deliveries coming through Eastport – leading the 1876 diversion of the new mailship Stroud to stop at Campobello and Deer Island before reaching Grand Manan. From 1903 to 1969, a post office operated at Chocolate Cove. By 1878 there were post offices in Fairhaven and Lord's Cove. In the 1970s, there were six stores on the island – whereas by 2019 only two remained, Richardson's and Bella's. HW Welch's sardine business used to maintain two stores, the Leonardville outlet was torn down in 1974, and the Fairhaven store operated until 1991 when managers Wayne and Gail Martin purchased it.

The south portion of the island is made of scattered hills on an inclined plane, composed of trap rock and slate. The northern portion of the island contains small deposits of magnetic iron ore, white quartz, zeolite, chlorite, greenstone (a type of trap rock containing hornblende and feldspar), toadstone and amygdaloid. The only mineral rights held by the Crown are for potential finds of gold, silver or coal - although no traces of valuable minerals are known to exist. Agate and chalcedony have been reported on the island.

The eastern coast of the island and surrounding waters have been the perennial subject of government interest in trying to establish a national marine park, which has met strong opposition from local residents who rely on the waters for their livelihood. The Clark Gregory Nature Preserve spans 73 acres in Chocolate Cove and a 19th-century gravesite. There has also been opposition to converting public-use beaches on the island to expand the aquaculture industry. There are whales, porpoises and seals present along the island's coast.

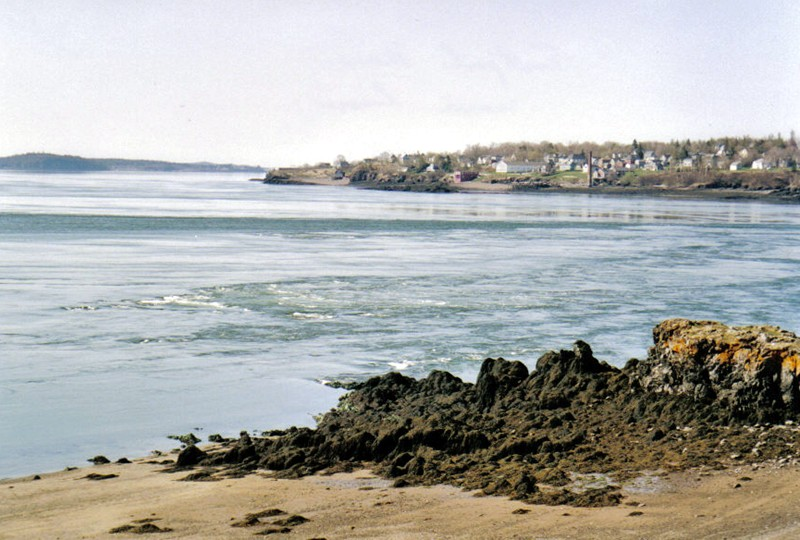
Low tide at Deer Island Point with the Old Sow in action.

The largest whirlpool in the Western Hemisphere, dubbed the Old Sow, is immediately off the southern tip of Deer Island, caused as tides rush past Indian Island and reach a 400' undersea trench that abuts a 281' underwater mountain. On March 28, 1830, a two-mast schooner was destroyed in the whirlpool drowning brothers Robert, James and William Stover whose widowed mother lived in Fairhaven and later relocated the family to Waterville, Maine.

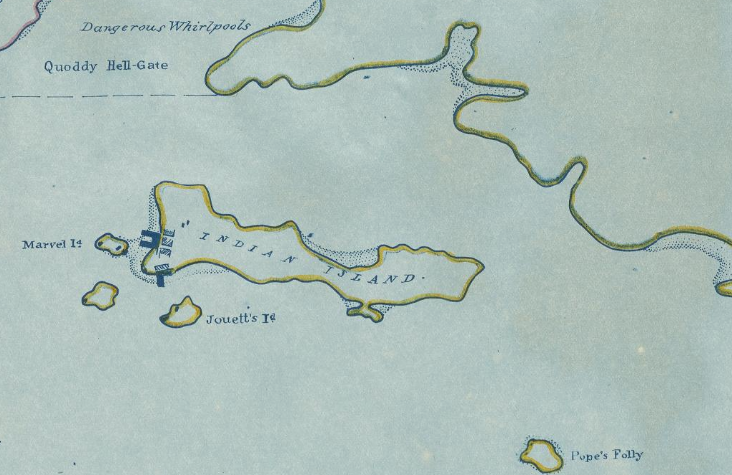
An 1830 map showed the "Quoddy Hell-Gate" of "dangerous whirlpools" off the southern tip of Deer Island.

In 1931, Frederick Low Olmstead caught attention in New York newspapers when he filed a civil claim against the Astor family falsely alleging Deer Island had belonged to his ancestor Cotton Mather Olmstead in 1705 when Captain Kidd had come ashore, and the island was later allegedly sold to a man curiously named Jacques Cartier working for John Jacob Astor. In this fantastical tale, Cartier discovered Kidd's treasure in 1892 beneath a rock with a cross on the island, leading Astor to secretly sell it all. These claims sparked ongoing rumors of Kidd's treasure on the island, even though it seemed publications were widely contradicting each other whether this was the Deer Island in New Brunswick, Maine or Massachusetts, and later correcting the alleged date of Olmstead's grant of the land when it was realised Kidd had died in 1701. Locals clung to the story as corroborating earlier rumors that pinpointed an area behind Alonzo Calder's house as the likely location of Captain Kidd's treasures.

As of 1966, Quebec corporation Ran-Lux Mines had obtained 25 mining claims totaling 1000 acres on Campobello, and five claims totalling 200 acres on Deer Island.

=== Infrastructure ===
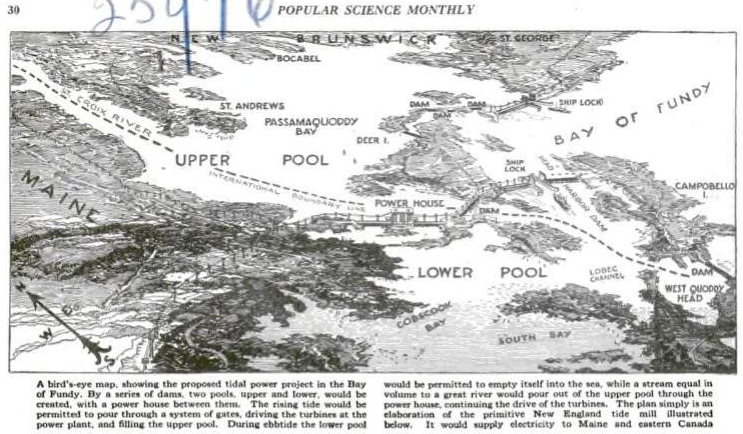
The most ambitious tidal power station plans called for dams between the US and Deer Island, to Campobello, back to the US.

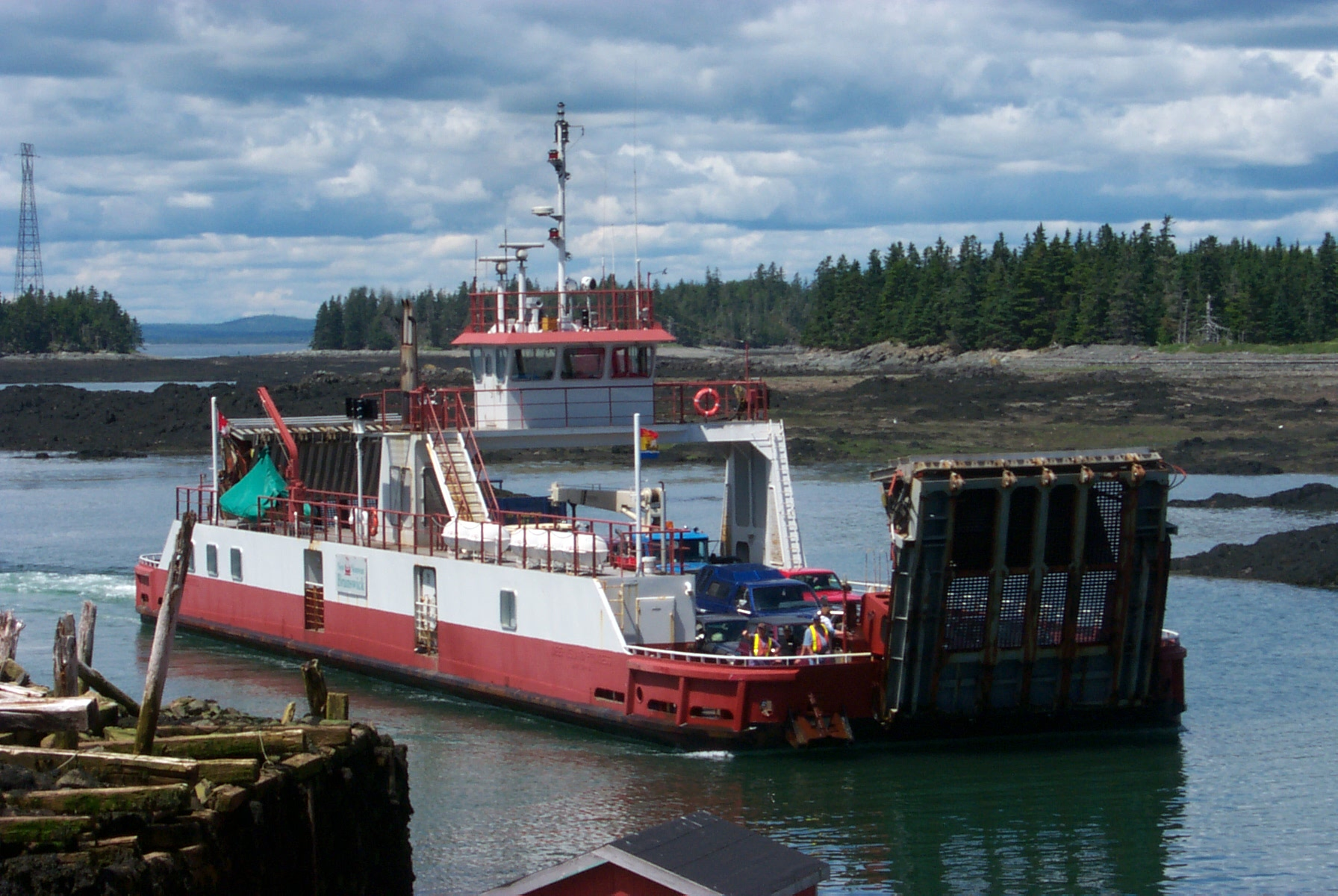
In 1976 suggestions to build a causeway linking Deer Island to Pendleton Island, or through Macs Island to the mainland, were dismissed as residents preferred the ferry system.

The major route is New Brunswick Route 772. Government ferries, the Deer Island Princess II and Abnaki II occasionally supported by the John Rigby, connect Deer Island with L'Etete, New Brunswick on the mainland. They are reached on VHF 14 (156.8MhHz). Deer Island has limited tourism attention and was described in the Bangor Daily News as "the sort of place meant for a very private vacation", and the southern tip of the island hosts a campground overlooking the Old Sow whirlpool.

There has been perennial discussion of harnessing tidal power to generate electricity, typically proposing a dam between Deer Island some of its north-eastern isles.

During the summer, East Coast Ferries Ltd. operates a ferry, Hopper II, from Cummings Cove on the southern shore of Deer Island onward to Campobello Island. A defunct ferry, the Fundy Trail II, operated between Cummings Cove and the US state of Maine until 2014. The island customs house was closed two years later. Ferry service came about in 1930 after residents campaigned for reduced taxation and registration fees as they had access to only twenty kilometres of roadway which was not accessible in winter and spring - leading the Board of Trade to propose regular government ferry service. In 1969, the DL McLaren was brought in to replace the Abnaki.

In the 1920s, the Bank of Nova Scotia operated in the building east of the Lord's Cove schoolhouse. In the 1970s, frustration with the lack of banking on the island led to the creation of the Deer Island Credit Union which ran for 28 years until it was revealed a single employee had embezzled nearly $2 million in funds during her career before committing suicide when the fraud was discovered. The eventual fall-out and efforts to claim damages in the Court of King's Bench of New Brunswick and Appeals Court in 2011–12 led to an unsuccessful effort to land before the Supreme Court of Canada.

The road to Deer Island Point, on the southern tip of the island above the whirlpool, did not exist until 1932 previously requiring a boat to travel to the homestead of George Chaffey and his family.

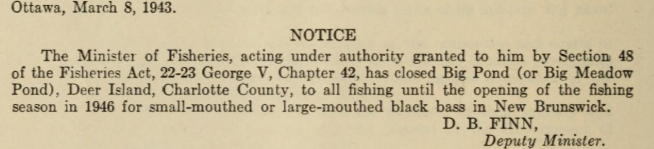
The 1943 closure of fishing in the pond

There are two lighthouses on Deer Island, a square frustum tower with balcony and lantern placed at Leonardville in 1916, and another at Deer island Point.

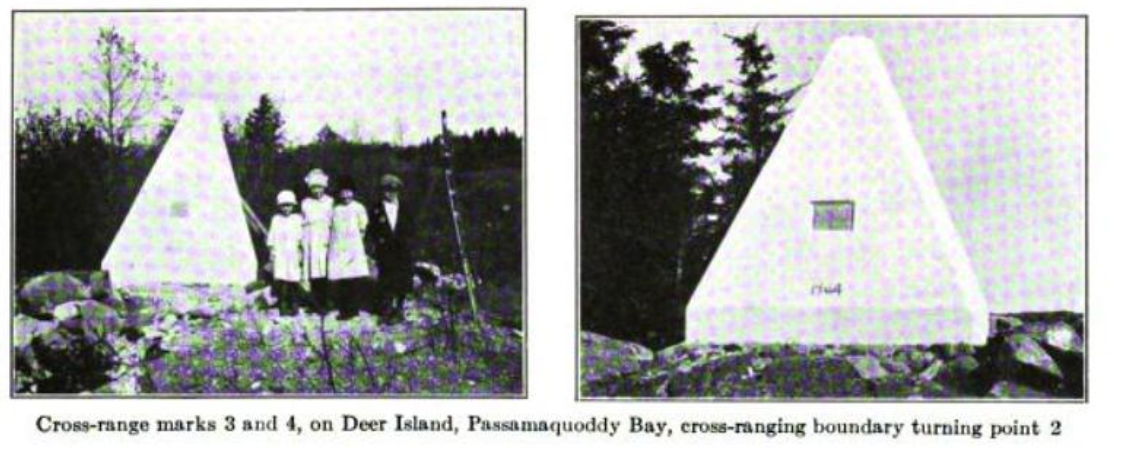
There are geodetic triangulation stations north of Cummings Cove, Davidson's Head, Butler Hill and at North Head.

Public Wharves
Location	Length	Depth
Chocolate Cove	147m	2.4m
Richardson	55m	2.1m
Fairhaven	76m	1.8m

Herring weirs, the world's largest lobster pound and salmon pens supplement the fishing economy. William Martin, born on the island 1819, together with William Balkham and Henry Sellman claimed to be the first North American sardine packers.

In the 1940s, the islands' schools had consolidated into a single Deer Island Regional School teaching Kindergarten through Grade 12 - and in 1969, the enrollment was 150 students. The school continues to operate, but older pupils take the ferry to Fundy High School on the mainland. The island has strongly pushed for construction of a high school but efforts to re-establish one have been difficult as Islanders felt "laughed at by the government in Fredericton" as there are only about 10 students per grade. Traditionally the small class sizes have resulted in merging multiple grades together.

There have been suggestions of building a Quoddy Power project, from the island's southern tip with dams to the mainland of Maine and from its northern tip to the mainland of New Brunswick however they have not come to fruition. A 1976 idea was investigated to build a pioneer village highlighting antique fishing village lifestyles, proposing a blacksmith shop, barrel cooper, fish shed, smokshed, tar pot, livery and country store.

Medical care is provided through the Deer Island Health Centre. There are nine cemeteries on the island.

== Gallery ==
Historical photos of island
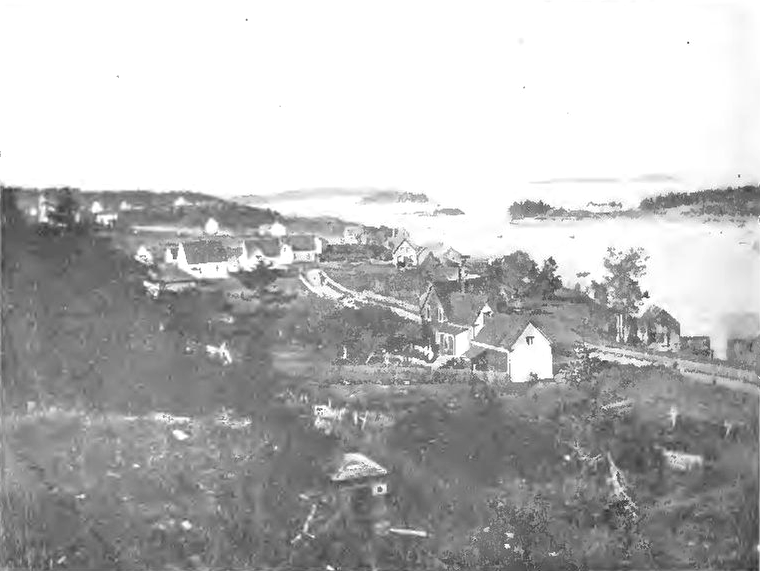
Leonardville and Bar Island

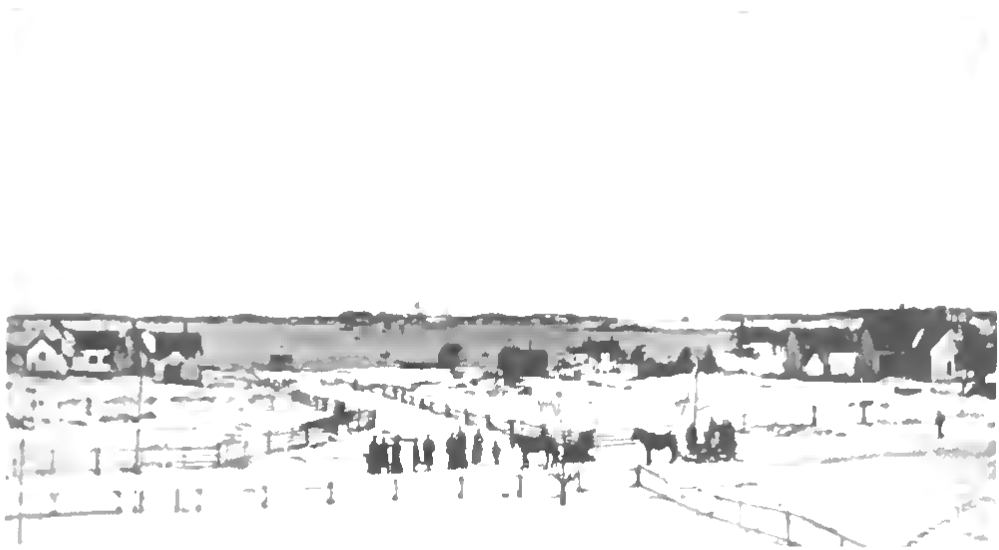
Mail-day in Lambert's Cove.

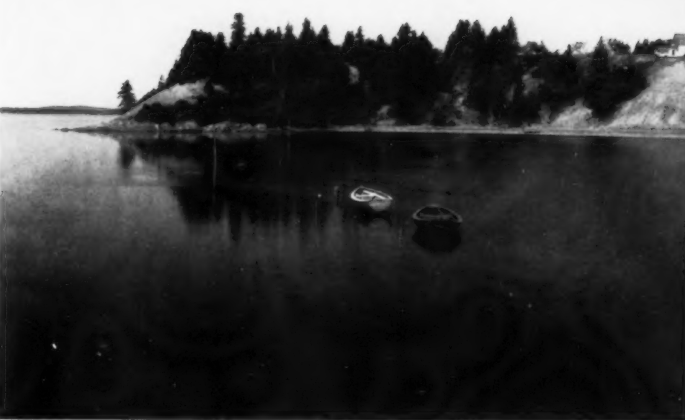
Boats off Cummings Cove

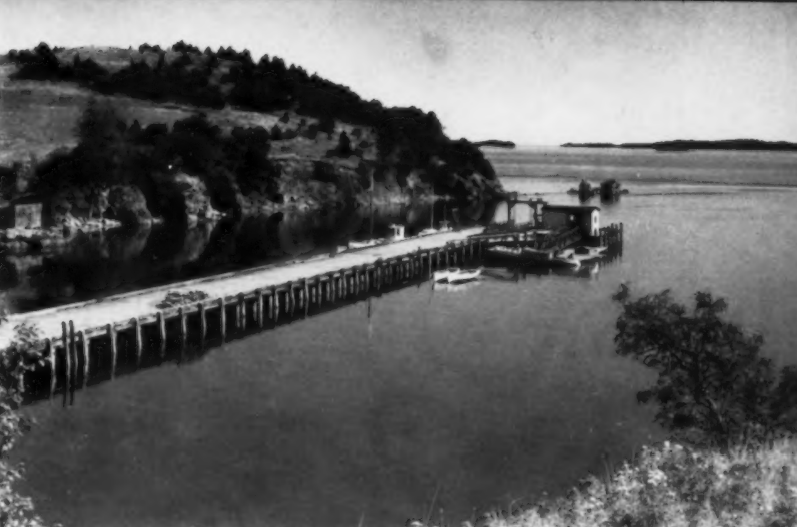
Chocolate Cove

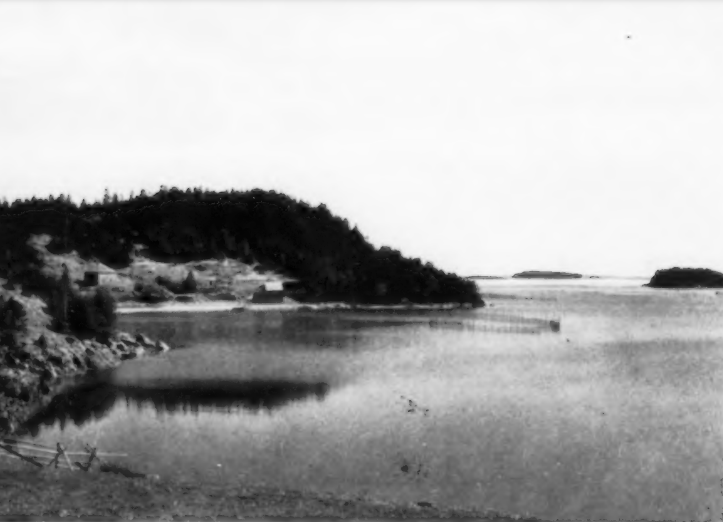
Northwest Harbour

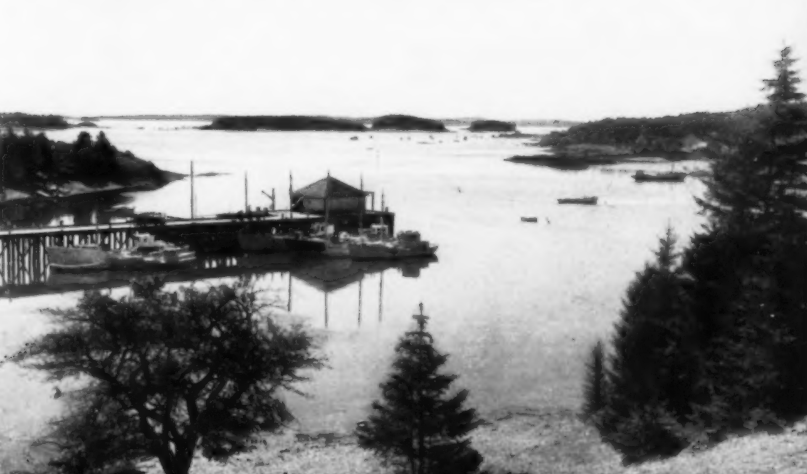
Lord's Cove.
