= Awake (disambiguation) =

To be awake is to experience wakefulness, the state of being conscious.

Awake may also refer to:

== Film and television ==
- Awake (2007 film), an American conspiracy thriller film by Joby Harold
- Awake: The Life of Yogananda, a 2014 American documentary film
- Awake (2019 film), an American crime action thriller film directed by Aleksandr Chernyaev
- Awake (2021 film), an American apocalyptic science fiction thriller film directed by Mark Raso
- Awake (TV series), a 2012 American police procedural fantasy drama series starring Jason Isaacs
- Awake: The Million Dollar Game, a 2019 streaming game show
- "Awake" (Once Upon a Time), a television episode
- "Awake", a season 4 episode of Servant (TV series)

== Music ==
=== Albums ===
- Awake (Alison Wonderland album) or the title song, 2018
- Awake (Dream Theater album), 1994
- Awake (Godsmack album), or the title song (see below), 2000
- Awake (Hillsong Worship album), 2019
- Awake (Illenium album), 2017
- Awake (Josh Groban album), 2006
- Awake (John Wesley Harding album), 1998
- Awake (Julian Marley album) or the title song, 2009
- Awake (L'Arc-en-Ciel album), 2005
- Awake (Secondhand Serenade album) or the title song, 2007
- Awake (Skillet album), 2009
- Awake (Tycho album) or the title song, 2014
- Awake (Wands album) or the title song, 1999
- Awake? (Zao album) or the title song, 2009
- Awake: The Best of Live, by Live, 2004
- Awake, by Crematory album), 1997
- Awake, by DeLon, 2011
- Awake, by Klinik, 1996

=== EPs ===
- Awake (KNK EP), 2016
- Awake (Tamta EP), 2020
- Awake, by Bleed the Dream, 2003
- Awake, by Trash Talk, 2011

=== Songs ===
- "Awake" (Crash Karma song), 2009
- "Awake" (Donkeyboy song), 2009
- "Awake" (Godsmack song), 2000
- "Awake" (Mutiny Within song), 2009
- "Awake" (Snoop Dogg song), 2015
- "Awake", by Asia from Aura, 2001
- "Awake", by Black Rebel Motorcycle Club from B.R.M.C., 2001
- "Awake", by BTS from Wings, 2016
- "Awake", by the Clay People from The Clay People, 1998
- "Awake", by Finch from What It Is to Burn, 2002
- "Awake", by Holy Knights from Between Daylight and Pain, 2012
- "Awake", by Pillar from The Reckoning, 2006
- "Awake", by Seventh Day Slumber from Finally Awake, 2007

== Other uses ==
- Awake!, a magazine published by Jehovah's Witnesses
- AWAKE (Advanced WAKEfield Experiment), a plasma acceleration facility at CERN
- "Awake", the first episode of the video game Life Is Strange: Before the Storm
- Auake people, or Awake, an ethnic group of South America
- Awaké language, a language of South America

== See also ==
- Awaken (disambiguation)
- Awakening (disambiguation)
- Wakeful (disambiguation)
- Waking (disambiguation)
- Wake (disambiguation)
