= Internal Combustion =

Internal Combustion may refer to:

- Internal combustion engine
- Internal Combustion (album), a 2010 album by Society Burning
- Internal Combustion, a 1994 album by Canned Heat
- "Internal Combustion" (short story), a 1956 story by L. Sprague de Camp
- Internal Combustion, a 2007 nonfiction book by Edwin Black
- "Internal Combustion" (CSI), a 2010 TV episode
