= The Awakening =

The Awakening may refer to:

== Religion ==
- Awakening (Finnish religious movement), a Lutheran movement in Finland
- Great Awakening, several periods of Anglo-American Christian revival

== Film and television ==
=== Film ===
- The Awakening, a 1913 film starring Charlotte Burton
- The Awakening (1917 film), an American silent film directed by George Archainbaud
- The Awakening (1928 film), an American silent film directed by Victor Fleming
- The Awakening (1954 film), an American television short film starring Buster Keaton
- The Awakening (1956 film), an Italian comedy drama film
- The Awakening (1980 film), a British horror film directed by Mike Newell
- Omen IV: The Awakening, a 1991 American supernatural horror television film
- The Awakening, a 1995 television film starring Sheila McCarthy
- The Awakening (2006 film), a Bollywood documentary
- Species: The Awakening, a 2007 American science fiction thriller film
- The Awakening (2011 film), a British supernatural drama film
- Blue Lagoon: The Awakening, a 2012 American romantic drama television film
- The Awakening (upcoming film), a British thriller film

=== Television ===
- The Awakening (TV series), a 1984 two-part Singaporean drama series
- The Awakening (Doctor Who), a 1984 Doctor Who serial

==== Episodes ====
- "The Awakening" (Avatar: The Last Airbender)
- "The Awakening" (Defiance)
- "The Awakening" (Masters of Science Fiction)
- "The Awakening" (Spider-Man)

== Literature ==
- The Awakening (Armstrong novel), a 2009 Darkest Powers novel by Kelley Armstrong
- The Awakening (Carroll novel) or The Quantum Prophecy, a 2006 novel by Michael Carroll
- The Awakening (Chopin novel), an 1899 novel by Kate Chopin
- The Awakening (Smith novel), a 1991 Vampire Diaries novel by L. J. Smith
- "The Awakening" (short story), a 1942 story by Arthur C. Clarke
- The Awakening, the third and final arc of the Ben Drowned series by Alexander D. Hall

== Music ==
- The Awakening (band), a musical project of Ashton Nyte

=== Albums ===
- The Awakening (Ahmad Jamal album) or the title song, 1970
- The Awakening (The Awakening album), 2024
- The Awakening (Billy Harper album) or the title song, 1979
- The Awakening (Caliban album) or the title song, 2007
- The Awakening (Iniko album), 2025
- The Awakening (James Morrison album) or the title song, 2011
- The Awakening (Kamelot album), 2023
- The Awakening (Lord Finesse album), 1996
- The Awakening (Melissa Etheridge album) or the three-song title work, 2007
- The Awakening (Merciless album) or the title song, 1990
- The Awakening (Nekropolis album) or the title song, 1997
- The Awakening (The Pharaohs album), 1971
- The Awakening (PMD album) or the title song, 2003
- The Awakening (P.O.D. album) or the title song, 2015
- The Awakening (Send More Paramedics album), 2006
- The Awakening (EP), by GFriend, 2017
- The Awakening, by the Red Jumpsuit Apparatus, 2018
- The Awakening, by the Reddings, or the title song, 1980

=== Songs ===
- "The Awakening", by Alice Cooper from Welcome to My Nightmare, 1975
- "The Awakening", by Becoming the Archetype from Children of the Great Extinction, 2022
- "The Awakening", by Demon Hunter from Summer of Darkness, 2004
- "The Awakening", by Edison's Children, 2011
- "The Awakening", by Fairyland from The Fall of an Empire, 2006
- "The Awakening", by Godsmack from Faceless, 2003
- "The Awakening", by Hawkwind from Space Ritual, 1973
- "The Awakening", by Hope for the Dying from Dissimulation, 2011
- "The Awakening", by Lovebites from Awakening from Abyss, 2017
- "The Awakening", by Mors Principium Est from ...And Death Said Live, 2012
- "The Awakening", by Narada Michael Walden from Awakening, 1979
- "The Awakening", by Narnia from Awakening, 1998
- "The Awakening", by the Pat Metheny Group from Imaginary Day, 1997
- "The Awakening", by War of Ages from Arise and Conquer, 2008
- "The Awakening", by York, 1998
- "The Awakening", a piece of library music composed by Johnny Pearson and used as theme music by ITV

== Other uses ==
- The Awakening (sculpture), a 1980 sculpture by J. Seward Johnson Jr.

== See also ==
- Awakening (disambiguation)
- Awake (disambiguation)
- Awaken (disambiguation)
- Enlightenment in Buddhism
- National awakening (disambiguation)
- Romantic nationalism
