= Awakening (comics) =

Awakening, in comics, may refer to:

- The Awakening (Image Comics) by Stephen Blue, published in 1997 by Image Comics
- The Awakening (Oni Press) by Neal Shaffer and Luca Genovese, published in 2004 by Oni Press
- Awakening (Archaia), by Nick Tapalansky and Alex Eckman-Lawn, published in 2007 by Archaia Studios Press
- Awakenings (comics), Eric Hobbs and Gabe Pena, published in 2004 by Eighth Day Entertainment
- Awakening Comics, a company and title
- I Am Legend: Awakening, film tie-in, published in 2007 by DC Comics
- Starchild: Awakenings, published in 2008 by Coppervale Press
- "Awakening", the story in Stone, by Image Comics

== See also ==
- Awakening (disambiguation)
