= Is God in Showbusiness Too? =

Studio album by The Watchmen
- Released: 1991
- Studio: Sounds Bueno Studios (San Diego, California)
- Genre: Electro-industrial
- Length: 42:46
- Label: Prescient Thought
- Producer: Dave Mansfield

The Watchmen chronology
Is God in Showbusiness Too? (1991)	Plague (1992)

Is God in Showbusiness Too? is the debut studio album of The Watchmen, released in 1991 by Prescient Thought.

== Reception ==
X Magazine gave Is God in Showbusiness Too? a mixed review and said "overall, these guys are really tight, more so than any unsigned band I've ever listened to. Bandleader Dave Creadeau has a good ear for blending the evil and the ethereal, and that comes out especially well on instrumental tracks such as "Brave New ; World," "Nine-Eleven" and the haunting sample-narrated "Black Rain"." The magazine noted that "the only things that make it sound like it's not a full-on pro-level industrial-dance album are a handful of rough-sounding synth patches and a couple of samples that are kind of clumsily used."

== Track listing ==
All tracks are written by The Watchmen.

Side one
No.	Title	Length
1.	"Brave New World"	2:01
2.	"Mutual Assured Destruction"	4:54
3.	"Redemption"	3:13
4.	"Under the Steeple"	4:16
5.	"Black Rain"	3:16
6.	"Gangland"	4:21

Side two
No.	Title	Length
1.	"The Fury"
2.	"Crash!"	4:16
3.	"Nine-Eleven"	1:32
4.	"Obsession"	3:05
5.	"Merciful Release"	4:26
6.	"The End..."	2:28

== Personnel ==
Adapted from the Plague liner notes.

The Watchmen

- Boom Fernandez (as Boom Christopher) – guitar
- Dave Mansfield (as Dave Creadeau) – programming, guitar, vocals, production, engineering, cover art, design

Additional performers

- David Secore (as !x! Blaze) – programming, vocals

== Release history ==
Region	Date	Label	Format	Catalog
United States	1991	Prescient Thought	CS	PTP-02, WATC1
United States		Prescient Thought	DL	PTP-02, WATC1
