= Society Burning =

American industrial rock band

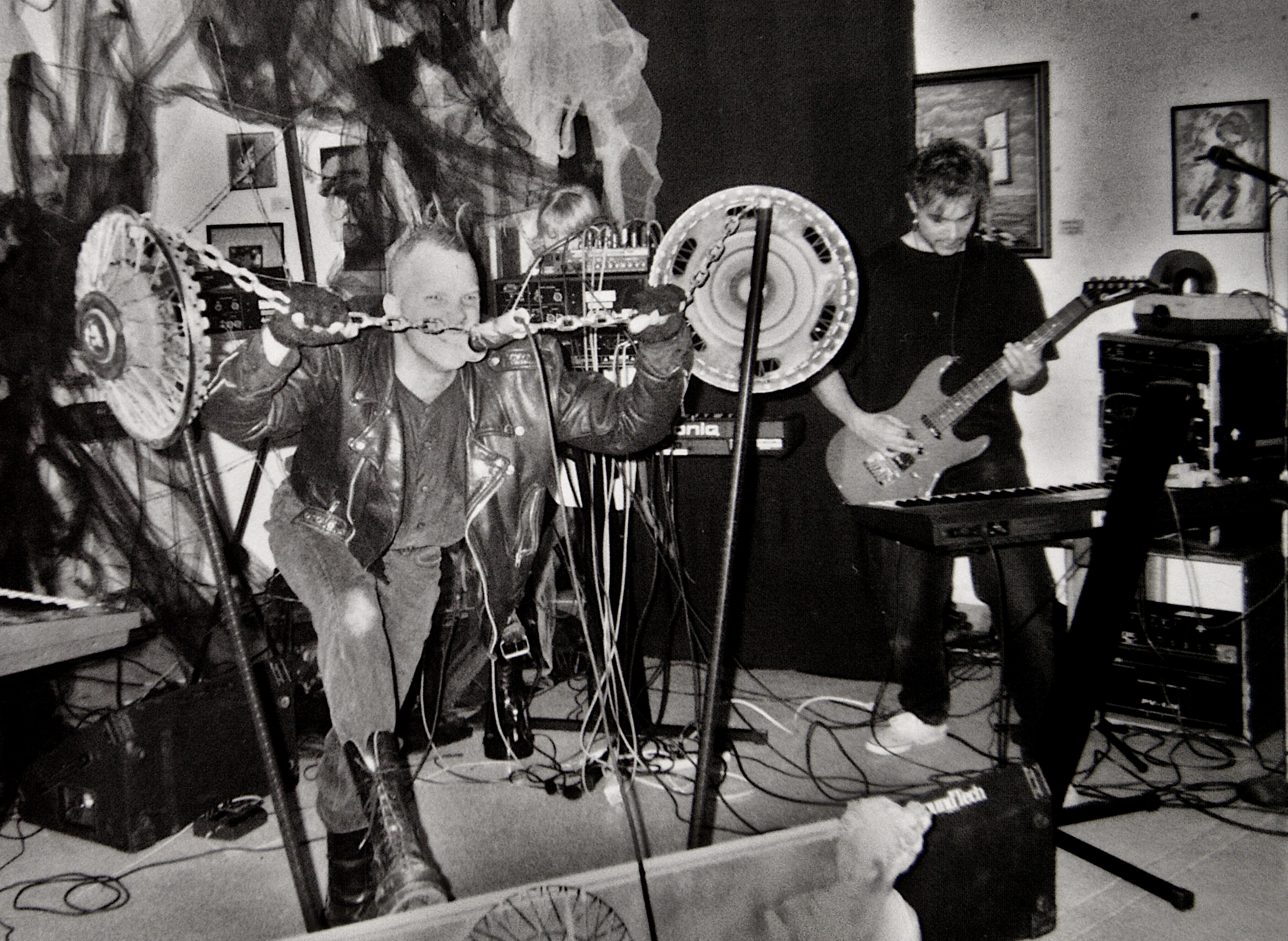
- Daveoramma (left) and Boom chr Page in 1996

Background information
- Also known as: The Watchmen
- Origin: Las Cruces, New Mexico, U.S.
- Genres: Industrial; electronica; synthcore; coldwave
- Years active: 1991–present
- Labels: Audiocomm International; Re-Constriction
- Members: Daveoramma; Boom chr Page; Twitch
- Past members: Tracey
- Website: societyburning.com

Society Burning is an American coldwave industrial rock band composed of Daveoramma (born Dave Mansfield, a.k.a. Dave Creadeau), Twitch, and Boom chr Paige (born Boom Fernandez). The group was founded in Las Cruces, New Mexico, in 1991 and was originally named The Watchmen (a tribute to the Alan Moore graphic novel).

== History ==
Daveoramma (born Dave Mansfield) began recording music in 1991 under the name Watchmen with one other person while at New Mexico State University in Las Cruces, NM. As an instructor of recording arts at the university, Mansfield had unfettered access to the university's 16-track recording studio, where he met Boom chr Paige (born Boom Fernandez), who was recording for a band called Your Mother. Boom provided guitar work and other musical support during the production of Watchmen's first release, Is God in Showbusiness Too?.

After completing work on the Showbusiness cassette, Chase of If It Moves... records (later Cargo/Re-constriction records) found out about the band via a New Mexico college radio station. Soon after, Chase include their track "Merciful Release" on the compilation Cyberflesh Conspiracy.

After the other member of Watchmen left, Dave asked Boom to officially join the band. The duo released a second self-produced work, Plague, in January 1992, gaining further attention from Chase, as well as from German label Kugelblitz. Both labels released compilations featuring the band, but the band changed its name upon discovering at least two other bands vying to use the name Watchmen. The resulting name change to Society Burning (ripped from a quote from a Denver, Colorado newscast) was chosen in time for both record labels to use the name on separate compilation appearances.

During this time the band relocated to Denver, Colorado, where they met and enlisted, for a time, Michael Smith of Fiction 8 for assistance with keyboards on-stage. The move to Denver turned out to be difficult financially, and the duo found that they spent more time working to make ends meet than creating, a situation which contributed a turn towards writing "really mean music".

In 1993, the band met Steven Seibold of Hate Dept., who would go on to produce/re-engineer the song "Human Waste" for the Re-Constriction compilation Thugs 'n' Kisses. This would be the beginning of an odd precedent set by Re-Con and the band for 'premixing', or releasing the remixed material before releasing the original versions of their work.

In the first years of the 1990s, the band utilized emerging technologies alongside their music, from promotion via Usenet and via internet as early as 1991, to being one of the first bands with a website as the World Wide Web emerged in 1994. In 1993, before the Web, Boom programmed and distributed 3.5" floppy discs containing multimedia samples of the band's work in packages they called "noise letters." The band's multimedia expressions continued beyond the nineties with Dave's own company, Prescient Thought Productions.

In 1994, Twitch (a.k.a. DJ Twitch) – an industrial DJ in Denver – met Boom while he was working at a local software retailer and they immediately connected. Soon after, Twitch took his place as guitar player for the band while Boom switched to keyboards. Also in 1994, the band brought on Tracey – Boom's wife, a once Miss Teen Colorado and classically trained pianist – for live keyboard support. Despite the band having additional personnel for live support, they never had the financial support to justify a tour, but did play many one-off shows.

In 1995, Society Burning signed to Re-Constriction. The band had already begun work on an album, spending time and money on a professional studio in Golden, Colorado. At the same time, the band released older tracks to other artists for remixing. Due to a series of delays, Chase at Re-Constriction decided to release the remixes before the debut album was complete. The following year, the label issued the "premix" CD EP, Entropy Lingua. By October 1996 the band had re-worked their original material and had the album Tactiq ready for release, but logistical concerns at Re-Constriction pushed its release into 1997.

Over the next two years, the musicians worked mostly independently: Mansfield worked with a cast of voices to bridge songs for the parody/tribute album Cyberpunk Fiction while Fernandez worked as remixer for artists including Leæther Strip, Purr Machine, THD, Urania, Hexedene, and Battery.

In 1998, the band provided six tracks for the Re-Constriction satire soundtrack CyberPunk Fiction – A Synthcore "Soundtrack" alongside other bands such as Tinfed, Killing Floor, Christ Analogue, Collide, Purr Machine, 16 Volt and Hexedene. The band also created the mock dialogue filler in the style of the film between the compilation tracks.

The band parted ways in 1999, following the closure of Re-Constriction. After completing a degree at the Colorado Institute of Art, Dave relocated to Los Angeles, California, while Twitch remained in Denver, Colorado, and Boom relocated to Philadelphia, Pennsylvania.

The band regrouped in 2007, writing material for a new release on their own Audiocomm International Publishing label in addition to finalizing and releasing their previously unreleased 1994 album State of Decay in late 2009. October 2010 saw the release of their sixth album, Internal Combustion.

Mansfield has frequently teamed-up with other bands and producers to lend both vocal and production support. In 2017, he provided vocals for Gross National Produkt's track "Faceless." In 2020, Mansfield joined Gabriel Wilkinson of Microwaved to co-produce the track "The Enemy God" for the latter's EP release Phantom Whisper.

== Discography ==
=== Albums and EPs ===
- Is God in Showbusiness Too? (1991) (as The Watchmen) Label: Prescient Thought Productions PTP-02
- Plague (1992) (as The Watchmen) Label: Prescient Thought Productions PTP-03
- State of Decay (1994) (released 2009) Label: Audiocomm International Publishing
- Entropy.Lingua (1996) Label: Cargo/Re-constriction REC-019
- Tactiq (1997) Label: Cargo/Re-constriction REC-036
- Internal Combustion (2010) Label: Audiocomm International Publishing
- Nausea ad Nauseam (2011) Label: Audiocomm International Publishing
- D3l3te Up10ad (2015) Label: Audiocomm International Publishing
- Rotor 25 (2016) Label: Audiocomm International / Rabid Coyote Music
- Ready End User (2021) Label: Audiocomm International / Rabid Coyote Music / Technocosmic Music
- End User Agreement (2024) Label: Audiocomm International / Rabid Coyote Music / Technocosmic Music

=== Compilations ===
- Cyberflesh Conspiracy (1992) (as 'The Watchmen') Song: Merciful Release (Razor Hammer Mix) Label: Cargo/Re-Constriction IIM-02
- Rivet Head Culture (1992) Song: Party Girl (Radio Edit) Label: Cargo/Re-Constriction IIM-03
- Shut Up Kitty (1993) Song: Stand and Deliver (Adam Ant re-cover) Label: Cargo/Re-Constriction REC-009
- Rotation.3 (1993) Song: Vision (Signal AC42) Label: Kugel Blitz KBR 002
- Biotech 01: Colorado Electronics Compiled (1994) Song: Lovesick Label: SDS Productions SDS-019
- Thugs 'n' Kisses (1995) Song: Human Waste (Hate Dept. Mix) Label: Cargo/Re-Constriction REC-016
- Vampire Rodents: Clockseed (1995) Song: Clockseed (Guest Vocal Appearance) Label: Cargo/Re-Constriction REC-017
- Chambermade (1995) Song: Awaken ([Hate Dept.] Mix) Label: Cargo/Re-Constriction REC-300
- Vampire Rodents: Gravity's Rim (1996) Song: Evasion (Guest Vocal Appearance) Label: Fifth Column Records 9868-63224-2
- Operation Beatbox (1996) Song: Colors (Ice-T re-cover) Label: Cargo/Re-Constriction REC-023
- Re-Constriction 10* Year Anniversary (*=5) (1996) Song: Dead Man Label: Cargo/Re-Constriction REC-400
- T.V. Terror (1997) Song: Magnum P.I. Theme Label: Cargo/Re-Constriction REC-032
- Awake the Machines (1997) Song: Less Than Zero Label: Out of Line OUT-017
- Circuit Noir (1997) Song: Broken Label: United Endangered Front UEF-CD/1006
- Got Moose? (1997) Song: Tactiq Label: Cargo/Re-Constriction REC-037
- Persistence of Division Motion Picture Soundtrack (1997) Song: Time Label: Kinotonik KINO.CD 001
- Cyber-punk Fiction (1998) Label: Cargo/Re-Constriction REC-31 Songs: Cyberpumpkin and Engergizer Honey Bunny Dialogue, Electro Body Music Dialogue, Busted Surf Boards, Chemlab's Dead Baby Dialogue, Bullwinkle Pt.2, Mos Eisley Download Contest Dialogue, If Love is a Red Dress (Hang Me in Rags), Bring out the Hack Dialogue, Comanche, Flowers on the Wall, User-friendliness goes a Long Way Dialogue, Surf Rider, FAQ 25.17 Dialogue
- Songs from the Wasteland (1998) Song: Naked and Savage (Originally by The Mission UK) Label: Cargo/Re-Constriction REC-041
- Nod's Tacklebox of Fun (1999) Song: Lovefool (Originally by The Cardigans) Label: Cargo/Re-Constriction REC-35
- The Challenge From Beyond (A Tribute To H.P. Lovecraft) (2000) Song: Hold Your Breath (Dreams 1 And 2) Label: Dion Fortune, SPV GmbH
- Drowned Visions (2011) Song: Nauseau Ad Nauseam (Kinky Sex And Breakfast Mix) Label: Dark Horizons
- CRL Studios Presents: The Second Wavelength (Dark) (2011) Song: Exile (Skidmark Dub Mix) Label: CRL Studios CRLF013-2
- Electronic Saviors: Industrial Music To Cure Cancer Volume II: Recurrence (2012) Song: I Am the Man Label: Metropolis, Distortion Productions
- CRL Studios Presents: The Third Wavelength (Life) (2015) Song: Playing with Undead Things Label: CRL Studios
- Electronic Saviors: Industrial Music To Cure Cancer Volume IV: Retaliation (2016) Song: Memory Label: Metropolis, Distortion Productions
- Neo-Denver Is About To Explode: Weltmuzik Festival (2017) Song: Deleting Me Again (Expunged Remix) Label: Welt Muzik
- Electronic Saviors: Industrial Music To Cure Cancer Volume V: Remembrance (2018) Song: Bleed for Me Label: Metropolis, Distortion Productions
- Electronic Saviors: Industrial Music To Cure Cancer: Synthcore Dreams Vol. 1 (2018) Song: Stand In L1ne Label: Distortion Productions
- A Riveting Protest (2019) Song: For What It's Worth (Originally by Buffalo Springfield) Label: Riveting Music
- Electronic Saviors – Electronic Music To Cure Cancer Vol VI: Reflection (2020) Song: Under Your Skin (Esaviors6mix) Label: Distortion Productions
- Regulate This (2022) Song: Sex (I'm a...) (Originally by Berlin) Label: Riveting Music
- Electronic Saviors: Industrial Music To Cure Cancer: Synthcore Dreams Vol. 2 (2023) Song: In the Year 2525 (Originally by Zager and Evans) Label: Distortion Productions
- Electronic Saviors: Industrial Music To Cure Cancer: Synthcore Dreams Vol. 3 (2023) Song: Reboot Label: Distortion Productions
- Electronic Saviors Vol. 7: ReUnion (2025) Song: Doctor Fantastic, Inc. Label: Metropolis, Distortion Productions
