= Internal Combustion (album) =

Studio album by Society Burning
- Released: October 12, 2010
- Genre: Electro-industrial
- Length: 54:48
- Label: Audiocomm International
- Producer: Boom Fernandez; Dave Mansfield

Society Burning chronology
| State of Decay (2007) | Internal Combustion (2010) |

Internal Combustion is the third studio album by Society Burning, released on October 10, 2010 by Audiocomm International. The album was available to download for free between January 5 and 22 of 2012 exclusively.

== Reception ==
Fabryka Music Magazine gave Internal Combustion four out of four possible stars and commended the band for keeping their cold wave roots intact while successfully fusing classic rock, dark wave, industrial, electronic and classical music. LemonWire called the album "15 tracks of harsh electro industrial rock" and "sometimes overpowering, other times atmospheric and open, the tracks still retain the signature sound."

== Track listing ==
All tracks are written by Boom Fernandez, Dave Mansfield and David Secore.

| No. | Title | Length |
|---|---|---|
| 1. | "Internal Combustion No. 01" | 0:43 |
| 2. | "Nausea Ad Nauseam" | 3:44 |
| 3. | "Honestly, I'm Lying (Lie)" | 3:44 |
| 4. | "Double Plus Minus" | 2:03 |
| 5. | "Detritus" | 3:23 |
| 6. | "Inflatable Buddha" | 2:21 |
| 7. | "Internal Combustion No. 02" | 3:30 |
| 8. | "D1sint3grat10n" | 3:55 |
| 9. | "The Monster Under Your Bed" | 4:00 |
| 10. | "Splinter Cellphone" | 0:40 |
| 11. | "Living in the Shadow of Myself" | 4:00 |
| 12. | "Very Small Openings in the Skin" | 3:46 |
| 13. | "Exile" | 4:05 |
| 14. | "Vapor Lock" | 2:00 |
| 15. | "Internal Combustion No. 03" | 3:52 |
| 16. | "Nausea Ad Nauseam" (Produkt Remix) | 4:21 |
| 17. | "The Monster Under Your Bed" (Awakend Mix) | 4:49 |

== Personnel ==
Adapted from the Internal Combustion liner notes.

Society Burning

- Boom Fernandez (as Boom chr Paige) – synthesizer, guitar, production, cover art, design
- Dave Mansfield (as Dave Creadeau) – vocals, synthesizer, production, cover art, design

Additional performers

- Joe Abraham – vocal production (3)
- Produkt – remixing (16)
- UCNX – Remix (17)

Production and additional personnel

- Terry Beck – photography
- Mt. Lepper – photography

== Release history ==
| Region | Date | Label | Format | Catalog |
|---|---|---|---|---|
| United States | 2010 | Audiocomm International | CD, DL | AIC-222 |
