= Plague (The Watchmen album) =

Studio album by The Watchmen
- Released: 1992
- Recorded: August 1991 – February 1992
- Studio: Prescient Thought (Los Alamos, New Mexico)
- Genre: Electro-industrial
- Length: 55:06
- Label: Prescient Thought

The Watchmen chronology
Is God in Showbusiness Too? (1991)	Plague (1992)	Entropy.Lingua (1996)

Plague is the second studio album by The Watchmen, released in 1992 by Prescient Thought.

== Reception ==
Westword called the music of Plague "slick and well mastered" and said "keyboards, samples, distorted vocals and titles such as "Fear" prepare you for Skinny Puppy-style aggression; instead, much of the material is caught in the netherworld between modern dance music and accessible industrial beats."

== Track listing ==
Side one
No.	Title	Lyrics	Music	Length
1.	"...End"		Mansfield	1:21
2.	"Less Than Zero (Gift)"	Mansfield	Fernandez, Mansfield, Secore	3:48
3.	"Fear"	Fernandez	Fernandez	4:31
4.	"Free Man"	Mansfield	Mansfield	3:46
5.	"Merciful Release" (Dying Breath Mix)	Mansfield	Mansfield, Secore	4:48
6.	"Rot"	Fernandez, Mansfield	Fernandez, Mansfield	3:28
7.	"In Sickness & In Health"		Fernandez	0:51
8.	"Plague I"	Fernandez, Mansfield	Fernandez, Mansfield	4:05

Side two
No.	Title	Lyrics	Music	Length
1.	"Neurotransit"		Fernandez	3:11
2.	"Vision (Signal Ac42)"	Mansfield	Fernandez	3:39
3.	"Cyber – Generation"		Fernandez, Mansfield	2:48
4.	"Internal Bleeding (Shame)"	Mansfield	Fernandez, Mansfield	5:30
5.	"Party Girl"	Mansfield	Mansfield	3:45
6.	"To Have & To Hold"		Mansfield	2:56
7.	"Plague II (Drowning Man)"	Mansfield	Fernandez, Mansfield	6:49

== Personnel ==
Adapted from the Plague liner notes.

The Watchmen

- Boom Fernandez (as Boom Christopher) – production, recording, engineering, backing vocals (A2, A3, A6, A8, B2, B7), keyboards (A3, A7, B1, B3, B4, B5), guitar (A4, A5, A8, B5, B7), lead vocals (A3, A5, B2, B7), noises (A3), phone (B3)
- Dave Mansfield (as Dave Creadeau) – keyboards, production, recording, engineering, lead vocals (A2, A4, A5, A6, A7, B4, B5, B6), sampler (A1, A7, B1, B3, B6), backing vocals (A7, B2, B8), Walkie-talkie (B6)

Additional performers

- Michael Sauter – backing vocals (B5, B7)
- David Secore (as !x! Blaze) – keyboards (A4), synthesizer (B7)

Production and design

- Neil Henderson – post-production, mastering

== Release history ==
Region	Date	Label	Format	Catalog
United States	1992	Prescient Thought	CS	PRTH003
United States		Prescient Thought	DL	PRTH003
