= Tactiq =

Studio album by Society Burning
- Released: July 15, 1997
- Recorded: 1995–October 1996
- Genre: Electro-industrial
- Length: 58:12
- Label: Re-Constriction

Society Burning chronology
Entropy.Lingua (1996)	Tactiq (1997)	State of Decay (2007)

Tactiq is the debut studio album of Society Burning, released on July 15, 1997 by Re-Constriction Records. The secret song located on track sixty-nine is a cover of Adam Ants's "Stand and Deliver", which is a reworked version of what appeared on the Shut Up Kitty compilation.

== Reception ==
Sonic Boom praised the band for exploring new sounds, saying "by not choosing to remain stuck in a musical rut, the band has chosen to stride forth into new musical territory without forgetting their original musical roots." Aiding & Abetting gave the album a more mixed review, criticizing the direction and writing as being inconsistent.

== Track listing ==
All tracks are written by Society Burning, except "Stand and Deliver" by Adam Ant and Marco Pirroni.

No.	Title	Length
1.	"Awaken"	4:03
2.	"Dead Man"	4:31
3.	"Less Than Zero"	4:58
4.	"Waster"	4:47
5.	"Tactiq"	6:15
6.	"Immobilize Me"	5:03
7.	"Human Waste"	4:55
8.	"Michelle Ascends From Hell"	5:11
9.	"Rot"	4:08
10.	"Merciful Release"	5:21
11.	"[Silence]"	0:04
69.	"Stand and Deliver" (hidden track)	5:08

== Personnel ==
Adapted from the Tactiq liner notes.

Society Burning

- Dave Creadeau – vocals, synthesizer, cover art
- Boom chr Paige – vocals, synthesizer, guitar, cover art

Additional musicians

- Steven Seibold – production and keyboards (7)

Production and additional personnel

- Mark Derryberry – engineering (9)
- DJ Twitch – co-producer (6)
- J. Holder – cover art

== Release history ==
Region	Date	Label	Format	Catalog
United States	1997	Re-Constriction	CD	REC-036
