= Awakening =

Awakening(s) most often refers to:

- Wakefulness, the state of being conscious

Awakening(s) may also refer to:

== Religion ==
- Awakening (Finnish religious movement), a Lutheran movement in Finland
- Enlightenment in Buddhism, from bodhi ("awakening")
- Great Awakening, several periods of Anglo-American Christian revival
- Spiritual awakening, a religious experience

== Film and television ==
=== Film ===
- Awakening (1959 film), a Czechoslovak film starring Josef Kemr
- Awakening, a 1981 Chinese film starring Joan Chen
- Awakenings, 1990, directed by Penny Marshall, adapted from the book by Oliver Sacks (see below)
- Awakening (1992 film) or Mary from Beijing, a Hong Kong film
- Awakening (2013 film), a Nigerian thriller
- Suryaa: An Awakening, a 1989 Indian film
- Underworld: Awakening, a 2012 American action horror film

=== Television episodes ===
- "Awakening" (Angel)
- "Awakening" (Buck Rogers in the 25th Century)
- "Awakening" (The Outer Limits)
- "Awakening" (Sanctuary)
- "Awakening" (Star Trek: Enterprise)
- "Awakening" (Stargate Universe)
- "Awakenings" (Devious Maids)
- "Awakenings" (Knots Landing)
- "Awakenings" (Ninjago)

== Literature ==
- Awakening (comics), a number of titles
- Awakening (book), a 2017 non-fiction book by Nathaniel Frank
- Awakenings (book), a 1990 non-fiction book by Oliver Sacks
- Awakening, a 2008 novella by Judith Berman
- Awakening, a Sweep novel by Cate Tiernan
- Awakening, the U.S. title of Les Mal Partis, a 1950 novel by Sébastien Japrisot
- Awakening, a young adult novel by Robin Wasserman in the Chasing Yesterday series

== Music ==
=== Classical compositions ===
- Awakening, a 2005 composition for string orchestra by Behzad Ranjbaran
- Awakenings, a 1991 composition for solo harp by Barry Conyngham

=== Albums ===
- Awakening (Blessthefall album) or the title song, 2011
- Awakening (Iris album), 2003
- Awakening (Jackie Evancho album), 2014
- Awakening (Narada Michael Walden album) or the title song, 1979
- Awakening (Narnia album) or the title song, 1998
- Awakening (Nicole Mitchell album) or the title song, 2011
- Awakening (Promise album), 2011
- Awakening (Sacred Reich album) or the title song, 2019
- Awakening (Sebalter album) or the title song, 2017
- Awakening (Sonny Fortune album) or the title song, 1975
- Awakening!!, by Jimmy Woods, or the title song, 1962
- Passion: Awakening, recorded live at Passion Conferences 2010, or the title song
- Awakening, by Color Me Badd, 1998
- Awakening, by Hiroshi Sato, 1982

=== Songs ===
- "Awakening" (song), by Switchfoot, 2007
- "Awakening", by the Absence from Riders of the Plague, 2007
- "Awakening", by Aurora, 2013
- "Awakening", by Celldweller from Soundtrack for the Voices in My Head Vol. 02, 2012
- "Awakening", by Chuck Salamone from Absent Moon, A Hylics Song Cycle, 2023
- "Awakening", by Disarmonia Mundi from Nebularium, 2001
- "Awakening", by Empire of the Sun from Ice on the Dune, 2013
- "Awakening", by God Forbid from Equilibrium, 2012
- "Awakening", by Living Sacrifice from Reborn, 1997
- "Awakening", by Ravi Shankar from Shankar Family & Friends, 1974
- "Awakening", by Scooter from Wicked!, 1996
- "Awakening", by the Script from Freedom Child, 2017
- "Awakening", by Sylosis from Edge of the Earth, 2011
- "Awakenings", by Symphony X from The Odyssey, 2002
- "Awakening", by Unleash the Archers from Apex, 2017
- "Awakening", from the Final Fantasy XI video game soundtrack, 2002

=== Other uses in music ===
- Awakening Music, a label specializing in Islamic music
- Awakenings (festival), techno music events held in the Netherlands

== Other uses ==
- Awakening (political party), a Latvian right-wing party
- Awakening Foundation, a Taiwanese feminist organization
- Awakening (video game series), a 2010–2014 series of casual puzzle adventure games
- Awakening (Wynn Las Vegas show), stage production show at the Wynn Las Vegas
- Awakenings: New Magic in 2057, a 1995 role-playing game supplement for Shadowrun
- Awakening, a repeating period in Strauss–Howe generational theory

== See also ==
- The Awakening (disambiguation)
- Awake (disambiguation)
- Awaken (disambiguation)
- National awakening (disambiguation)
- Romantic nationalism
