= The Quoddy Tides =

- "The Most Easterly Published Newspaper in the US"
- Type: Biweekly newspaper
- Format: Broadsheet
- Founder: Winifred B. French
- Publisher: Edward French
- Editor: Edward French
- Founded: November 1968; 57 years ago
- Language: American English
- Headquarters: 123 Water St., Eastport, Maine
- City: Eastport, Maine
- Country: United States
- Circulation: c. 5000
- ISSN: 1521-1266
- OCLC number: 34001716
- Website: quoddytides.com
- Free online archives: qdy.stparchive.com

The Quoddy Tides is a community newspaper published in Eastport, Maine covering several communities in Washington County, Maine and Charlotte County, New Brunswick. It styles itself the "most easterly published newspaper in the United States". It is published on the second and fourth Friday of each month. The first issue was published on November 29, 1968.

Its coverage area includes Eastport, Calais, Lubec, Machias, and other communities.

== History ==
The Quoddy Tides was founded by Winifred B. French, who moved to Eastport in 1955 with her husband, a physician, and their family. After the closure of local newspapers in Eastport and nearby Lubec in the 1950s and 1960s, she saw a need for a community news outlet. After a year spent researching the newspaper business, she launched The Quoddy Tides with its first issue on November 29, 1968.

The newspaper covered communities in "the region touched by the tides of Passamaquoddy Bay" on both sides of the border between Canada and the United States. For several years the paper's typesetting and paste up were done on the Canadian island of Deer Island. The copy, advertisements and other newspaper contents, and the finished paste ups, were taken from Eastport to Deer Island and back by seasonal ferry in the summer or by fishing boat in the winter.

The first edition of The Quoddy Tides appeared late. A note on the paper's front page explained that the editor (Winifred French) "had a car accident taking copy to the printer in Blue Hill and now has a broken nose and black and blue eyes". Since the first issue, the paper has never been late publishing.

Winifred French was named Maine Journalist of the Year in 1979. In 2018 she was inducted into the Maine Press Association Hall of Fame.

Winifred French died in 1995 and was succeeded as publisher and editor by her son Edward French.

== Circulation ==
As of August 2017, circulation was about 5,000. In 2019 The Quoddy Tides had subscribers in every American state except South Dakota. In 2024 it had at least one subscriber in every other state.

== Publication ==
The newspaper is owned by Edward French and his siblings. As of 2016 it had six full-time staff as well as free lance correspondents in the communities covered, for a total of about 30 contributors. The area covered includes "Eastport, Pleasant Point, Perry, Pembroke, Robbinston, Charlotte, Dennysville, Whiting, Lubec, Campobello, Deer Island, Grand Manan and some coverage (and circulation) in Calais and Machias." The newspaper, which has a biweekly dateline, is printed each 2nd and 4th Friday each month and is available on newsstands throughout the Passamaquoddy Bay region. Print subscriptions are mailed nationwide and fully searchable digital archives are available. The paper is printed on the press of The Ellsworth American.

The newspaper is owned by a family. James Fallows, in The Atlantic, wrote that the family ownership means that the newspaper is not subject to commercial pressures that fractured other local newspapers. Fallows added that the newspaper's coverage of other towns means that it gets more subscribers.
