= Awaken =

Awaken or Awakened may refer to:

== Film and television ==
- Awakened (film), a 2013 American thriller by Joycelyn Engle and Arno Malarone
- The Awakened, a 2009 film featuring Richard Kiel
- Awoken (film), a 2019 Australian horror film
- Awaken (TV series), a 2020–2021 South Korean drama series
- "Awaken" (12 oz. Mouse), a television episode
- "Awakened" (Charmed), a television episode

== Music ==
- Awaken (band), a Belgian rock band

=== Albums ===
- Awaken (The Empire Shall Fall album) or the title song, 2009
- Awaken (Koncept album) or the title song, 2012
- Awaken (Natalie Grant album) or the title song, 2005
- Awaken (NCT 127 album), 2019
- Awaken (Soulidium album), 2015
- Awaken (mixtape), by Keke Palmer, 2011
- Awaken, by The Blood Divine, 1996
- Awaken, by Jay Fung, 2020
- Awaken: The Surrounded Experience, by Michael W. Smith, 2019
- Awakened (album), by As I Lay Dying, 2012
- Awakened, by Vorvaň, 2021

=== Songs ===
- "Awaken" (song), a 2024 song by Breaking Benjamin
- "Awaken", by Annihilator from Refresh the Demon, 1996
- "Awaken", by Au5, 2021
- "Awaken", by Blue Stahli from Antisleep Vol. 03, 2012
- "Awaken", by Dethklok from The Dethalbum, 2007
- "Awaken", by Disturbed from Believe, 2002
- "Awaken", by Opshop from You Are Here, 2004
- "Awaken", by Society Burning from Entropy.Lingua, 1996
- "Awaken", by Wolves at the Gate from Captors, 2012
- "Awaken", by Yes from Going for the One, 1977

== Other uses ==
- Awakened (novel), a 2011 House of Night novel by P.C. Cast and Kristin Cast
- Awakened a 2018 sci-fi/horror thriller novel by James Murray and Darren Wearmouth
- The Awakened, A Fellowship in Christ, an American Christian group
- Sherlock Holmes: The Awakened, a 2006 adventure video game
- Awakened, a fictional character quality in the role-playing game Mage: The Awakening

== See also ==
- Wakefulness, the state of being conscious
- Awake (disambiguation)
- Awakening (disambiguation)
