= Produkt =

American rapper

- Born: Joseph R. Guerrido; April 10, 1986 (age 40); Bronx, New York, U.S.
- Genres: Hip Hop, Rap
- Occupation: Hip Hop Artist
- Years active: 2005–present
- Label: X Records (2006—Present)
- Website: iamprodukt.com

Joseph R. Guerrido (born April 10, 1986), better known by his stage name Produkt, is a Puerto Rican rapper and songwriter, born in Bronx, New York. He founded his label, Legacy Records Inc., in 2006. Since then, he has released two free mixtapes. He is the first rapper ever to be nominated for more than 3 single-year Underground Music Awards in the UMA's 11-year history.

== Career ==
Produkt is the first rapper to be nominated for 10 single-year Underground Music Awards. In 2014, he set a single-year record by winning three Underground Music Awards, the most in the UMA's 11-year history. Produkt's two-year-long ascent to notoriety accelerated when he released two well received singles: "Hold it Down" and "Freak Affair" in 2014. After thousands of downloads and shares on social media sites, "Hold it Down" caught the attention of music critics and in 2014 was nominated as UMA's Video and Song of the Year. Produkt's "Hold It Down" reached No. 9 on Billboard Hot Single Sales.

In 2015, Produkt set another major record by becoming the fastest artist to break into the LiveMixtapes top 50 most streamed Indy mixtapes with over 308,000 streams, passing current great artists' debut project like Kendrick Lamar, ScHoolboy Q, Logic, Kevin Gates, and many other prominent names in hip hop.

Once just another dealer chasing the good life, Produkt shifted focus solely to his music, writing, and rapping skills following the birth of his daughter. The Hispanic rapper counts Big Pun as his primary influence. Hip hop critics have been quoted as saying: "One listen to his music and it's plain to see that he is a force to be reckoned with," (Yo! Raps) and Hip Hop Lead says: "Produkt is the embodiment of true hip hop".

Following up his 2015 release "In.con.spic.ous" Produkt released "Change The Frequency". The Bronx native held a private listening event sponsored by Respect Magazine on July 26 in the Chelsea section of Manhattan where celebrities and influencers like Tahiry of Love & Hip-Hop came out to support his latest release. The event was hosted by Torae of Sirius XM's Hip-Hop Nation and DJ Envy of The Breakfast Club. It was a huge night for Produkt who shared the emotional experiences that led to the creativity of this project with his guest. From a tumor scare, to his battle with the streets and grind as a rapper, Produkt broke down the meaning of his music and purpose bar for bar.

=== Mixtapes ===
List of mixtapes, with year released
Title	Album details
From Flesh To Stone	Released: July 6, 2011; Label: Legacy Records; Format: Digital download
Mantra of a Dealer	Released: December 5, 2013; Label: Legacy Records; Format: Digital download
In.con.spic.u.ous	Released: June 16, 2015; Label: Legacy Records; Format: Digital download|
Change The Frequency	Released: August 8, 2017; Label: Legacy Records; Format: Digital download

=== Singles ===
List of singles, with selected chart positions, showing year released and album name
Title	Year	Peak chart positions			Mixtape
Title	Year	US	US R&B	US Rap	Mixtape
"Hold It Down"	2013	9	—	—	Mantra of a Dealer

== Music videos ==
Year	Song
2011	"Pocket Full of Money"
2011	Produkt featuring Naturally Amazing – "Gone Too Far"
2011	"Quarter Session" featuring J-30
2012	Produkt and Stizzle Stakz – "Hammer Dance Remix"
2013	"Father Forgive Me"
2013	"Come Get Me" (Sequel to "Father Forgive Me")
2013	"Evil"
2014	"Freak Affair"
2014	"Daddy Was A Dope Boy"
2014	"Hold It Down"
2014	"Let It Burn"
2014	"I'm Up"
2014	"Puerto Ricans F#%King Up The V.I.P."
2014	"My Perspective"
2014	"One Shot One Kill"
2015	"All Of Me"
2016	"Ruthless"
2017	"Paradise" "Mating Season" "CTF" "Movement" "Man Down"
2018	"Married to the Game"

== Awards ==
=== Underground Music Awards ===
2014 Won

- #1 Contender Award
- Best Male Rapper of the Year
- The UMA Song of the Year– ("Hold It Down")

=== All-Star Music Awards ===
2014 Won

- Video of the Year("Puerto Ricans F#%king Up The V.I.P.")
- Artist of the Year
