= Waking (band) =

American alternative rock band

Waking is an alternative rock band formed in 2000 in the New York / New Jersey area by guitarist J.P., lead vocalist Perfecto Cuervo, bassist Ray Greico, (formerly of New London Fire) and drummer Dann LeMunyan joined the band project. The band has written, self-produced, and distribute thousands of copies of their first EP album The Maze containing 7 tracks (6 studio recordings and one live performance) recorded in 2004 in Big Blue Meenie Studios in Jersey City, NJ and produced by Jay Canter. They were also featured on the 2006 September issue of No Cover magazine and appeared on Groupies Suck Vol. 8 compilation.

== Discography ==
- 2004: The Maze (EP)
1. Restless (3:14)
2. Tomorrow (3:09)
3. True Faith (4:00)
4. Never Go Away (3:09)
5. Drive (3:00)
6. The Maze (3:29)
7. Restless (live) (3:28)
