= The Awakened, A Fellowship in Christ =

- Founder: Melvin L. Severy
- Origin: 1932; Los Angeles, California

The Awakened, A Fellowship in Christ was a Christian group founded on Easter Sunday, 1932, by Melvin L. Severy.

It was created after Severy had been invited to see a painting of Christ by Charles Sindelar. Severy was very taken with the painting, and became convinced that the painting should be used to help gather the people of earth into fellowship centered on Christ. With the help of Sindelar, Severy formed the group for the purpose of preparing the world for the beginning of a new age as promised by the Bible. The group's future was to be determined on the basis of revelation over time.

Some years later, Guy Ballard came to visit Sindelar's studios. On seeing the painting, Ballard said the portrait was that of the Master Jesus, whom Ballard had been in communication with. Sindelar was very impressed by Ballard, and turned over the resources of The Awakened to the "I Am" Activity.
