= Waking =

Waking may refer to:

- Waking (band), an alternative rock band
- "The Waking", a poem by Theodore Roethke

== See also ==
- Waking Up (disambiguation)
