= Entropy.Lingua =

EP by Society Burning
- Released: March 5, 1996
- Genre: Electro-industrial
- Length: 33:31
- Label: Re-Constriction

Society Burning chronology
Plague (1992)	Entropy.Lingua (1996)	Tactiq (1997)

Alternative cover
- Entropy.Lingua.Reloaded

Entropy.Lingua is an EP by Society Burning, released on March 5, 1996 by Re-Constriction Records.

== Reception ==
Aiding & Abetting reviewed the Entropy.Lingua EP positively and credited Steven Seibold's remixes as being the standouts of the release, calling his mixes as "completely ready for the club floor." Jennifer Barnes at Black Monday commended the work as being a showcase of the talents of the remix artists and said "the remixes are different enough to keep the listener's interest but the songs have not been changed beyond recognition." Cyberlogue awarded the album five out of five possible "gears" and called it "one of the most important records you'll ever Fad Gadget praised the music and said "passionate, emotion-tearing, heart-ripping vocals command the body, rough flesh screams and barks gracefully yet forcefully spill out barebones "no forgiveness" lyrics" and recommended the album to listeners of Re-Constriction Records' roster. The Melodia gave the album high praise and said "Society Burning songs are an irresistible force where the beat will not be denied" and "the alternating vocals of both members grab your attention while the electronics hook you and keep you wriggling."

Another critic at Black Monday magazine appreciated the "dense programs mixed with guitars and sung/screamed vocals" and "angst just seems to drip from every song" but noted that "Human Waste" from the 1995 various artists compilation Thugs 'n' Kisses was a better representation of the band. Sonic Boom was somewhat critical of the band's change in direction from their earlier releases but admitted that their new sound fit in tightly with the independent music scene. U.S. Rocker Magazine called the music clichéd for industrial music but appreciated Alien Faktor's contribution.

== Track listing ==
All tracks are written by Society Burning.

No.	Title	Remixer(s)	Length
1.	"Tactiq" (Swineflesh Mix)	Apparatus	4:18
2.	"Immobilize Me" (D.C. Mix)	Drown	4:29
3.	"Tactiq" (D.O.H. Mix)	Hate Dept.	3:34
4.	"Waster" (D.O.H. Mix)	Hate Dept.	4:24
5.	"Fuel Line" (D.O.H. Mix)	Hate Dept.	5:00
6.	"Waster" (Stomp Mix)	Idiot Stare	3:54
7.	"Waster" (Brass Balls Mix)	Alien Faktor	4:20
8.	"Awaken" (Original Radio Mix)		3:31

2009 remastered release bonus tracks
No.	Title	Length
9.	"Under the Steeple" (Punishing Flesh Mix '92)	5:26
10.	"Fuel Line" (Original Mix)	5:34
11.	"Execution Style" (Radio Edit)	3:51
12.	"Stand and Deliver '97" (Adam and the Ants cover)	3:51

== Personnel ==
Adapted from the Entropy.Lingua liner notes.

Society Burning

- Dave Creadeau – vocals, synthesizer
- Boom chr Paige – vocals, synthesizer, guitar

Additional musicians

- Blake Barnes – remixing (1)
- Joseph Bishara – remixing (2)
- Chad Bishop – remixing (6)
- Mike Hunsberger – remixing (7)
- Scott Morgan – remixing (1)
- Tom Muschitz – remixing (7)
- Steven Seibold – remixing (3–5)
- David York – remixing (1)

== Release history ==
Region	Date	Label	Format	Catalog
United States	1996	Re-Constriction	CD	REC-019
United States	2009	Prescient Thought	DL	
