= Grace Helen Mowat =

Canadian artist and writer (1875–1964)

- Born: 31 January 1875; St. Andrews, New Brunswick
- Died: 22 February 1964 (aged 89); St. Andrews, New Brunswick
- Occupation: Writer
- Writing career
- Genres: Historical non-fiction, poetry, drama, and fiction

Grace Helen Mowat (31 January 1875 – 22 February 1964) was a Canadian artist and writer living in New Brunswick.

== Early life and education ==
The daughter of George Mowat and Isabella Campbell, Mowat was born on the Beech Hill family farm near St. Andrews, New Brunswick. The Mowat family was of United Empire Loyalist descent. In her childhood, Mowat spent a lot of time surrounded by her older relatives. There she developed an interest in narrative from reading old archived letters written by both sides of her family.

She was educated at Charlotte County Grammar School and went on to study at Richmond School of Art and Music in London and the Women's Art School at Cooper Union in New York City.

== Career ==
=== Writer ===
Mowat wrote lighthearted accounts of local history such as Funny Fables of Fundy (1928), and the Diverting History of a Loyalist Town (1932). In the 1920s–1930s, Mowat diverted her talents towards the local theatre as a playwright. The Perfect Actor, and the Unguarded Boarder, were among exceedingly popular attractions in the summer, and garnered the attention of many visitors.

=== Teacher ===
She started her teaching career at St. Catherine's Hall in Augusta, Maine. From there, she taught art classes at the Halifax Ladies College from 1902 to 1906. In 1907, she suffered a nervous breakdown and returned home to St. Andrews.

=== Art Director ===
In 1914, Mowat founded Charlotte County Cottage Craft, which provided an outlet for locally produced traditional crafts including pottery and weaving, and she served as its director until 1945. With her help, New Brunswick crafts were exhibited at the 1924 British Empire Exhibition in Wembley, London, England. She also founded the St. Andrews Music, Art, and Drama Society in 1934. Mowat wrote plays such as The Perfect Actor and The Unguarded Border.

== Later life ==
=== Honours ===
The University of New Brunswick awarded Mowat an honorary Doctor of Laws degree in 1951.

=== Death ===
She died in St. Andrews at the age of 89, and was buried under the headstone "Founder of Charlotte County Cottage Craft" in a rural family plot.

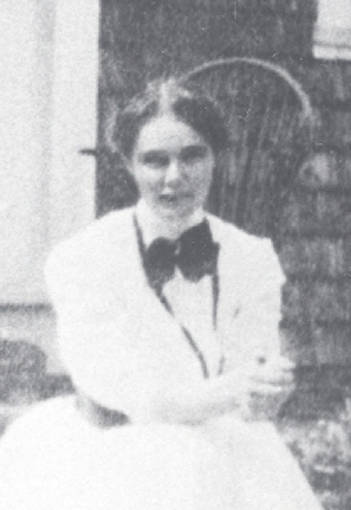
Grace Helen Mowat

== Selected works ==
- Funny Fables of Fundy (1928)
- The Diverting History of a Loyalist Town, A Portrait of St. Andrews (1932)
- Broken Barrier: A Romance of Staten Island and the Province of New Brunswick (1951)
- The House That Hurricane Jack Built (1954)
- A Story of Cottage Craft (1958)
- The Tories' King: George III and the Seeds of the Revolution (1976)
