= Awakenings: New Magic in 2057 =

Role-playing game supplement

Awakenings: New Magic in 2057 is a 1995 role-playing game supplement for Shadowrun published by FASA.

== Contents ==
Awakenings: New Magic in 2057 is a supplement focusing entirely on magic and provides a viewpoint on how people of the Sixth World view magic.

== Reception ==
Andy Butcher reviewed Awakenings: New Magic in 2057 for Arcane magazine, rating it a 7 out of 10 overall. Butcher comments that "The result is a strange combination of different bits and pieces. Awakenings is still a good solid supplement, though, and will prove useful for all types of campaigns."

== Reviews ==
- Envoyer #19
- Australian Realms #27
