= Wake (McMann novel) =

2008 novel by Lisa McMann

WAKE
- Author: Lisa McMann
- Language: English
- Genre: Novel
- Publisher: Simon & Schuster
- Publication date: 2008
- Publication place: United States
- Media type: Print (Hardback & Paperback)
- Pages: 325
- ISBN: 1-4169-7447-4
- OCLC: 291015259
- Followed by: FADE

Wake (Stylized WAKE) is a 2008 novel by Lisa McMann centered on seventeen-year-old Janie Hannagan's involuntary power which thrusts her into others' dreams. The novel follows Janie through parts of her young adulthood, focusing mainly on the events that occur during her senior year, in which she meets an enigmatic elderly woman, and becomes involved with Cabel, a loner and purported drug-dealer at Fieldridge High School. The book is set up in a diary like form, specifying the date and time at which each event occurs. The two books that follow Wake in the trilogy are Fade and Gone. Wake debuted on the New York Times Best Seller list for children's chapter books, and garnered several awards for young adult literature.

== Main characters ==
- Janie is the main character. She tells us what is going on in her life, and she is the most important character. She is able to see into other people's dreams and whenever she sees someone in class or riding the bus sleeping, she starts to get paralyzed when this happens.
- Cabel Strumheller, who develops a romantic relationship with Janie and is the only one who knows her secret. He does not play a major role until late in the story. He has a covert identity and helps police with drug busting. He is also plagued with dreams of killing a man who Janie later realizes is his father.
- Carrie Brandt, Janie's best friend, who usually hangs out with the wealthier kids. She is also Melinda's best friend. She has recurring nightmares of the death of her younger brother, who drowned. She becomes entangled in the drug bust in the end.
- Miss Stubin, an elderly woman who lives in Heather Home where Janie works. Also a dream catcher, she helps Janie realize her abilities.
- Captain Fran Komiski, Cabel's boss, and the one who is in charge of the drug-busting operation.
- Melinda Jeffers, Carrie's other best friend, is one of the rich kids Carrie hangs out with. She dislikes Janie very much.
- Janie's mother, who isn't even considered a main character because she is never there for Janie and is always in her bedroom drunk and hungover.

== Plot summary ==
The book begins with multiple flashbacks, all leading to Janie's extraordinary powers and where she stands in the present day. Janie Hannagan is an independent, 17-year-old senior at Fieldridge High School, living at home with her alcoholic mother and trying to find ways to fund her future college education. What makes Janie so different from her peers is that she has the involuntary ability to witness others' dreams. Janie discovered this ability at 8 years old when she was able to witness a businessman's dream of him giving a presentation in his underwear. From that day on, she is somewhat cursed by the long struggle and suffering of being part of others' dreams and nightmares. By taking part in others' dreams, she can see their fears and/or desires. This leads to Janie finding out the secrets of the people around her, but she cannot reveal them because they might think she is crazy. Whenever someone falls asleep within a certain distance of Janie, she automatically becomes paralyzed and unable to see anything other than what is happening in the dream she is viewing--- she is sucked into the other person's dream. This distance usually increases significantly if the dream the person is having is a nightmare. People within the dream she enters usually ask her for help, but she is unable to, for she doesn't know how to. All these incidents become a problem for Janie, especially towards her junior and senior years, because most of the time she cannot control the situation. Her peers, especially Cabel, become suspicious of her strange behavior. While most of her classmates have dreams typical of adolescent anxieties, Cabel, a mysterious loner, has frighteningly morbid dreams that Janie cannot come to terms with.

After several encounters, Janie and Cabel fall for each other on a class trip to Canada, during which time Cabel becomes aware of Janie's strange powers. Although Cabel helps Janie protect her secret, they are unable to maintain a close relationship due to pressure from their peers, secrecy, Cabel's growing reputation as a drug dealer to the wealthy and his hanging out at a wealthy girl's house all the time (Shay)...

Even as Janie and Cabel grow apart, their desire for each other increases. As Cabel seems to fall away from Janie and into the drug trade, Janie realizes things are not always as they seem, and she can learn to use her powers to help others and even serve the community.

But all is not as it seems, for Janie soon finds out that Cabel isn't a drug dealer and he was not involved with Shay in any way. But rather Cabel is a sort of undercover cop and was on the trail of a medium drug bust. Janie is relieved to find out that Cabel isn't doing drugs or hanging out with Shay because he wants to.

With the help of Miss Stubin at the Heather Home, Janie discovers that she is a dream catcher and has the power to help others resolve the dreams which are haunting them.

The climax of the story comes as Cabel, along with a number of other Fieldridge students and parents, is imprisoned on narcotics charges. Janie witnesses the dream of Shay's father who was the leader in this drug dealing business. The dream is very intense and lasts for hours and Janie soon becomes completely numb and falls out of her chair. Then Captain Fran, Cabel's boss, asks Janie what she saw in the dream, hoping that the dream would indicate the location of the drug dealer's major stash. Janie describes the dream to Fran and concludes that the drugs are sewn inside the life jackets on the drug dealer's yacht.

After all that she did to help the police, Janie was given a contract, a scholarship offer, and a paycheck.

== Awards ==
- WAKE - 2008 American Library Association Best Books for Young Adults
- WAKE - 2008 Cybil Award Finalist
- WAKE - 2009 American Library Association Top 10 Quick Picks for Reluctant Young Readers

== Development ==
The inspiration for the novel came from one of the author's dreams. "I had a dream that I was in my husband's dream, watching what he was dreaming about. When I woke up, I wrote it down and it sort of consumed my thoughts for the next month. Slowly the idea for the book and its main character, Janie, developed. Once I started writing, I couldn't stop."

== Critical reception ==
Since Wake's initial debut, it has generally received positive response from many critics. Publishers Weekly states, "The trick to getting hooked on this highly satisfying first novel is to look past its disjointed opening….The plot twists keep coming, even if one or two are shopworn, and the writing has a Caroline Cooney-like snap that's hard to resist." Booklist's Heather Booth wrote, "A fast pace, a great mix of teen angst and supernatural experiences, and an eerie, attention grabbing cover will make this a hit." The School Library Journal points out, "This book is ideal for reluctant readers, especially girls." Kirkus Reviews also gave the book praise, stating, "McMann lures teens in by piquing their interest in the mysteries of the unknown, and keeps them with quick-paced, gripping narration and supportive characters."
