= WAKE (AM) =

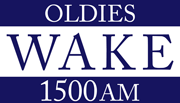
- Valparaiso, Indiana; United States
- Broadcast area: Northwest Indiana
- Frequency: 1500 kHz
- Branding: Oldies 1500, WAKE

Programming
- Format: Oldies

Ownership
- Owner: Marion Williams

History
- First air date: 1964
- Former call signs: WAYK (1964–1966)

Technical information
- Licensing authority: FCC
- Facility ID: 53057
- Class: D
- Power: 1,000 watts day; 25 watts night
- Transmitter coordinates: 41°26′36.14″N 87°2′54.1″W

Links
- Public license information: Public file; LMS

WAKE (1500 AM) is a radio station broadcasting an oldies format. Licensed to Valparaiso, Indiana, United States, the station is owned by Marion Williams. WAKE is a Class D radio station broadcasting on the clear-channel frequency of 1500 kHz.

== History ==
WAKE had an adult standards format until 2009, when it briefly switched to CNN Headline News, before adopting a classic country format in 2010. In November 2011, the station switched back to standards, using Dial Global Local's The Lounge format.

After "The Lounge" was discontinued on June 17, 2012, WAKE switched to an oldies/classic hits format featuring hit music chiefly from the 1970s and early 1980s, again using a Dial Global source.

WAKE went off the air in June 2018. The owners have applied to the FCC (for a construction permit) to move to Hobart, Indiana.

In August 2022, the station was simulcasting WGTO, which airs MeTV FM.

As of 2023, the station is again off the air.
