= Bade Airport =

Bade Airport Bandar Udara Bade
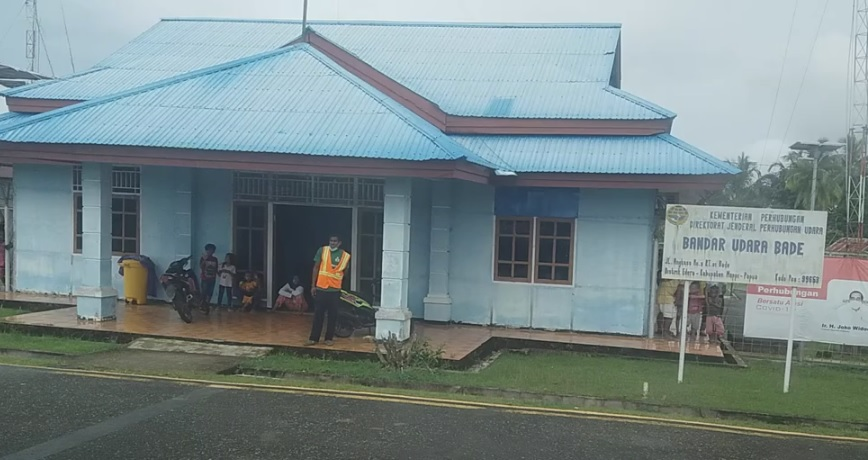
- Bade Airport
- IATA: BXD; ICAO: WAKE

Summary
- Location: Bade, South Papua, Indonesia
- Elevation AMSL: 28 ft / 9 m
- Coordinates: 7°10′33″S 139°34′59″E

Map
- Location in Western New Guinea Location in Indonesia

Runways
Direction	Length		Surface
Direction	ft	m	Surface
02/20	1,969	600	Asphalt
- DGCA

Bade Airport (Indonesian: Bandar Udara Bade) (IATA: BXD, ICAO: WAKE) is a domestic airport serving Edera District in Mappi Regency, South Papua, Indonesia. The airport is operated by the Technical Implementation Unit of the Directorate General of Civil Aviation. In 2017, the Ministry of Transportation listed Bade among 34 airports that had been built in isolated areas of Papua. As of 2025, Susi Air and Smart Aviation operated pioneer flights from Bade to Merauke, Tanahmerah, and Kepi.

== Facilities ==
Bade Airport is a Class III airport operated by the Directorate General of Civil Aviation. The airport has a runway measuring 600 x 18 metres, but there is plan to extend it to 900 metres.

== Airlines and destinations ==
Airlines	Destinations
Susi Air	Merauke, Kepi
Smart Aviation	Tanahmerah
