= John Williamson (Canadian politician) =

Canadian politician (born 1970)

John Williamson MP
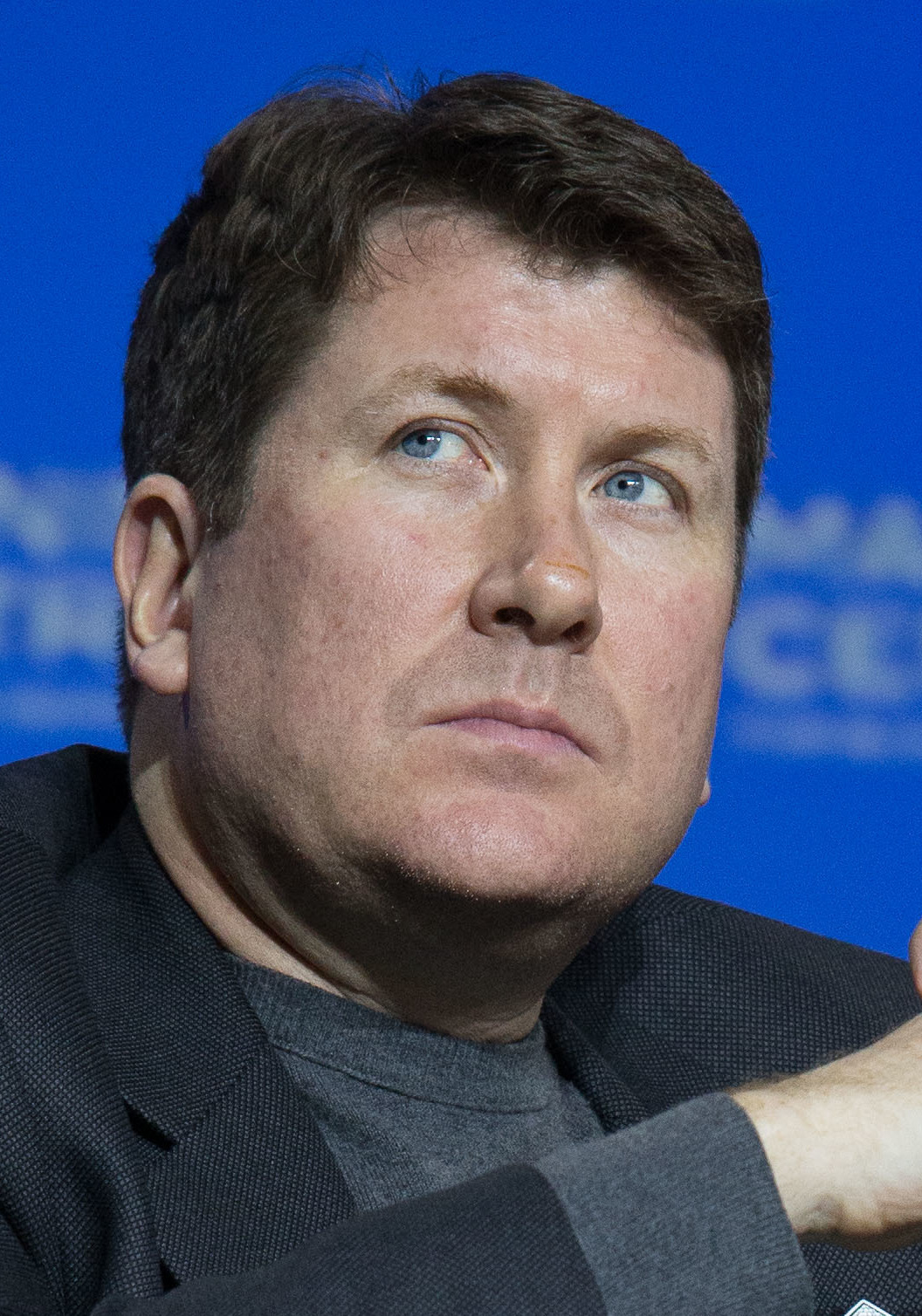

Member of Parliament for New Brunswick Southwest Saint John—St. Croix (2025-2026)
- Incumbent
- Assumed office October 21, 2019
- Preceded by: Karen Ludwig
- In office May 2, 2011 – October 19, 2015
- Preceded by: Greg Thompson
- Succeeded by: Karen Ludwig

Chair of the Standing Committee on Public Accounts
- Incumbent
- Assumed office June 16, 2025
- In office March 1, 2022 – January 6, 2025
- Preceded by: Tom Kmiec

Director of Communications to the Prime Minister of Canada
- In office August 2009 – March 2010
- Preceded by: Kory Teneycke
- Succeeded by: Dimitri Soudas

Personal details
- Born: January 30, 1970 (age 56) Fredericton, New Brunswick, Canada
- Party: Conservative
- Spouse: Kelly Williamson (m. 2013)
- Children: 1

John S. L. Williamson MP (born January 30, 1970) is a Canadian politician who represents the riding of New Brunswick Southwest in the House of Commons of Canada as a member of the Conservative Party of Canada. He was first elected in the 2011 Canadian federal election, and served until his defeat in 2015. In 2019, he won his seat back by defeating the Liberal incumbent Karen Ludwig. Williamson won re-election in 2021 and 2025.

== Education ==
Williamson graduated from Fredericton High School, and then McGill University with a degree in economics and political science. He later went on to receive a master's degree in economic history at the London School of Economics.

== Arms ==
Mr. Williamson is an heraldic heir, entitled to inherit a coat of arms.

== Early career ==
Williamson joined the National Post as an editorial writer and was a founding member of the newspaper's editorial board (1998-2001) before moving on to the Canadian Taxpayers Federation in September 2002. After opening up the organization's Toronto office, as provincial director for Ontario, he was promoted to federal director in January 2004. He remained in this position until his departure from the CTF in September 2008.

In 2009, Williamson was hired by Prime Minister Stephen Harper to become director of communications in the PMO and oversaw government-wide communications. He stepped down in 2010 in order to prepare his campaign after deciding to run in the 2011 Canadian federal election, and was succeeded as director of communications by Dimitri Soudas.

== Member of Parliament ==
As a Member of Parliament, Williamson has focused on issues relating to protecting taxpayer funds from waste and corruption, the development of natural resources, crime reduction, and protecting firearms ownership.

He was elected chair of the Canadian House of Commons Standing Committee on Public Accounts in the 45th Canadian Parliament in 2025.

=== Policy positions ===
==== Sunshine lists ====
Williamson has called repeatedly for the creation of a federal Sunshine list that would publish the salary information of public servants who earn over $100,000 per year, as is done in some provinces. For example, Williamson seconded Brent Rathgeber's Private Member's Bill C-461 when the bill was first introduced and then upon reintroduction. This bill would have required the public disclosure of the names and salaries of every federal employee earning in excess of $188,000. Williamson suggested that the threshold should be set at $157,000, the rate of pay of MPs at the time.

==== Bill C-30 ====
On multiple occasions, Williamson has spoken up against his own government policies, such as Bill C-30, a bill that ignited controversy about online anonymity and was eventually withdrawn.

==== Natural resource development ====
Williamson is also responsible for creating public calls for an oil pipeline from Alberta to Saint John, New Brunswick that would carry undistilled petroleum product to the east and across the St. Lawrence River for refining at the J. D. Irving plant.

==== Opposition to Bev Oda's travel expenses ====
On June 1, 2012 a story about Williamson's dismay in regard to International Cooperation Minister Bev Oda's travel expense claims surfaced in a CBC article. Williamson stated that he had brought the claims up in a caucus meeting but would not specify what he said due to caucus confidentiality. A member of his staff did, however, mention it could be taken in context of Williamson's past days as the National Director of the Canadian Taxpayers Federation.

=== Warawa affair ===
In March 2013 Williamson joined several backbench Conservative MPs in speaking to a point of privilege launched by MP Mark Warawa to the Speaker. Williamson advocated to increase the freedom of individual MPs to speak in the House of Commons by encouraging the Speaker to recognize any MP who wishes to make a Member's statement and also to pose a question in Question Period. The practice of the Speaker up to that point had been to recognize MPs who were allocated speaking spots by each party's leadership.

=== Chair of Public Accounts Committee ===
On March 1, 2022, Williamson was elected Chair of the Standing Committee on Public Accounts.

Under Williamson, the Public Accounts Committee studied a wide range of issues, most notably the outsourcing on government contracts related to ArriveCAN, the investigation into conflicts of interest at Sustainable Development Technology Canada, and audits of the government's COVID-19 programs.

On December 27, 2024, Williamson used his ability as chair to schedule a committee meeting on January 7, 2025, to discuss "a motion of non-confidence in the Liberal Government." However, the day before the scheduled meeting, Justin Trudeau prorogued Parliament, cancelling all business of the House, including scheduled committee meetings.

On June 16, 2025, Williamson was once again elected to serve as the Chair of the Public Accounts Committee.

=== Canada-China Committee ===
In 2019, two scientists, Xiangguo Qiu and her husband, Keding Cheng, were escorted out of the National Microbiology Laboratory (NML) in Winnipeg and had their security clearances revoked. Four months prior, Qui had sent samples of deadly viruses, including Ebola and Henipah, to China without proper authorization. This led to investigations by the RCMP and CSIS.

Having previously served on the Special Committee on Canada-China Relations, Williamson was selected to be the Conservative member on an ad hoc committee to examine documents relating to the NML, along with Liberal MP Iqra Khalid, Bloc Quebecois MP René Villemure, and NDP MP Heather McPherson.

On February 19, 2024, the ad hoc committee sent their report to the house leaders of each recognized party in the House of Commons, stating that "the majority of the PHAC material should be lifted," and "[t]he information appears to be mostly about protecting the organization from embarrassment for failures in policy and implementation, not legitimate national security concerns, and its release is essential to hold the Government to account." The mostly unredacted documents were tabled on February 28, 2024.

According to the documents, Qiu had "intentionally" worked to the benefit of the People's Republic of China, "without regard for the implications to her employer or to Canada's interests." It also noted her "reckless judgement regarding decisions that could have impacted public safety and the interests of Canada."

=== Bills sponsored ===
Throughout his tenure as MP, Williamson has sponsored two pieces of legislation, both in the 41st Parliament.

Bill C-518, Protecting Taxpayers and Revoking Pensions of Convicted Politicians Act, would have removed pensions from politicians convicted of certain offences in the Criminal Code.

Bill C-519, Ending Gasoline Tax on Tax Act, would have prevented the GST and HST from being levied on provincial or federal excise taxes levied on fuel.

=== Committee work ===
As an MP, Williamson has served on the following committees:

- Procedure and House Affairs (June 3, 2011 - January 31, 2012, September 20, 2012 - January 28, 2013)
- Health (June 13, 2011 - January 31, 2012)
- Subcommittee on Agenda and Procedure of the Standing Committee on Health (September 21, 2011 - January 31, 2012)
- Official Languages (January 31, 2012 - September 20, 2012, October 22, 2013 - January 27, 2014, January 30, 2014 - August 2, 2015, October 6, 2020 - August 15, 2021)
- Foreign Affairs and International Development (January 31, 2012 - September 20, 2012, September 20, 2012 - September 13, 2013)
- Public Accounts (January 28, 2013 - September 13, 2013, February 28, 2022 - January 6, 2025)
- National Defence (October 22, 2013 - January 27, 2014, January 30, 2014 - August 2, 2015)
- Special Committee on the COVID-19 Pandemic (April 20, 2020 - June 18, 2020)
- Special Committee on Canada-China Relations (January 15, 2020 - August 18, 2020, October 6, 2020 - August 15, 2021)
- Subcommittee on International Human Rights of the Standing Committee on Foreign Affairs and International Development (December 13, 2021 - February 25, 2022)
- Liaison (March 1, 2022 - January 6, 2025)
- Subcommittee on Agenda and Procedure of the Standing Committee on Public Accounts (May 5, 2022 - January 6, 2025)
- Subcommittee on Committee Budgets of the Liaison Committee (June 5, 2024 - January 6, 2025)

=== Controversies ===
On April 5, 2012, following the Senate vote to scrap the long-gun registry, Williamson quoted Martin Luther King Jr. saying "free at last, free at last", accompanied by cheers by other Conservative MPs.

On March 8, 2015, the media reported that Williamson made this remark about the Temporary Foreign Workers Program: "It makes no sense to pay 'whities' to stay home while we bring in brown people to work in these jobs." Williamson later apologized on Twitter for his "offensive and inappropriate language".

In April 2012 Williamson visited Toronto restaurant owner, Naveen Polapady, who was charged by Toronto Police with assault causing bodily harm, assault with a weapon and administering a noxious substance (a reference to the thrown spices) after allegedly defending his property from a repeated thief using spices from his kitchen. Williamson was quoted as saying "[l]ike a lot of Canadians, when I heard this story I was outraged and concerned that once again the Toronto Police had targeted the wrong individual" referring to the previous case of David Chen who had been charged when he apprehended a thief who had been stealing from his Chinatown store.

== Electoral record ==
2025 Canadian federal election: Saint John—St. Croix
Party	Candidate	Votes	%	±%	Expenditures
Conservative	John Williamson	26,591	53.08	+6.09	$125,259.43
Liberal	Karen Ludwig	20,784	41.49	+13.42	$57,294.45
New Democratic	Andrew Hill	1,643	3.28	−9.81	$5,288.15
Green	Gerald Irish	794	1.59	−2.46	none listed
Libertarian	Keith Tays	280	0.56	+0.51	$0.00
Total valid votes/expense limit		50,092	99.29	–0.05	$126,715.06
Total rejected ballots		356	0.71	+0.05	
Turnout		50,448	74.66	+9.28	
Eligible voters		67,567			
Conservative notional hold		Swing		−3.67	
Source: Elections Canada
Note: number of eligible voters does not include voting day registrations.

2021 Canadian federal election: New Brunswick Southwest
Party	Candidate	Votes	%	±%	Expenditures
Conservative	John Williamson	18,309	50.0	+0.8	$75,984.11
Liberal	Jason Hickey	8,750	23.9	-1.6	$51,273.87
New Democratic	Richard Trevor Warren	4,893	13.4	+5.2	$814.71
People's	Meryl Sarty	3,090	8.4	+5.3	$6,020.69
Green	John Reist	1,587	4.3	-9.2	$3,397.49
Total valid votes/expense limit		36,629	99.4	–	$105,371.47
Total rejected ballots		239	0.6		
Turnout		36,868	67.4		
Eligible voters		54,730			
Conservative hold		Swing		+1.2	
Source: Elections Canada

2019 Canadian federal election: New Brunswick Southwest
Party	Candidate	Votes	%	±%	Expenditures
Conservative	John Williamson	19,451	49.15	+10.59	$88,037.67
Liberal	Karen Ludwig	10,110	25.54	-18.38	$77,377.08
Green	Susan Jonah	5,352	13.52	+8.57	$7,039.17
New Democratic	Doug Mullin	3,251	8.21	-4.36	$0.00
People's	Meryl Sarty	1,214	3.07	-	$5,133.77
Veterans Coalition	Abe Scott	200	0.51	-	$0.00
Total valid votes/expense limit		39,578	100.00		
Total rejected ballots		301	0,75	+0.17	
Turnout		39,879	74,46	+0.21	
Eligible voters		53,556			
Conservative gain from Liberal		Swing		+14.49	
Source: Elections Canada

2015 Canadian federal election: New Brunswick Southwest
Party	Candidate	Votes	%	±%	Expenditures
Liberal	Karen Ludwig	16,656	43.92	+30.36	$58,390.36
Conservative	John Williamson	14,625	38.56	-18.10	$115,782.35
New Democratic	Andrew Graham	4,768	12.57	-10.74	$14,930.22
Green	Gayla MacIntosh	1,877	4.95	-0.15	$1,331.74
Total valid votes/expense limit		37,926	100.00		$198,596.97
Total rejected ballots		220	0.58	-0.01	
Turnout		38,146	74.25	+9.54	
Eligible voters		51,376			
Liberal gain from Conservative		Swing		+24.23	
Source: Elections Canada

2011 Canadian federal election: New Brunswick Southwest
Party	Candidate	Votes	%	±%	Expenditures
Conservative	John Williamson	18,066	56.64	-1.68	$46,347.59
New Democratic	Andrew Graham	7,413	23.24	+6.69	$7,703.67
Liberal	Kelly Wilson	4,320	13.54	-6.03	$25,159.26
Green	Janice Harvey	1,646	5.16	-0.40	$7,546.35
Christian Heritage	Jason Farris	450	1.41	–	$2,698.60
Total valid votes/expense limit		31,895	100.0		$81,201.04
Total rejected, unmarked and declined ballots		188	0.59	-0.01	
Turnout		32,083	64.71	+3.54	
Eligible voters		49,578			
Conservative hold		Swing		-4.18	
