= Gary Kobinger =

Canadian immunologist and virologist

Gary Kobinger OM MSC
- Born: Gary P. Kobinger; Quebec City, Quebec, Canada
- Education: Université Laval; University of Montreal; University of Pennsylvania
- Known for: Development of Ebola vaccine and treatment
- Scientific career
- Fields: Biology; immunology; virology
- Workplaces: Galveston National Laboratory
- Doctoral advisor: Éric A. Cohen
- Other academic advisors: James Wilson

Gary P. Kobinger is a Canadian immunologist and virologist who is currently the director at the Galveston National Laboratory at the University of Texas. He has held previous professorships at Université Laval, the University of Manitoba, and the University of Pennsylvania. Additionally, he was the chief of the Special Pathogens Unit at the National Microbiology Laboratory (NML) of the Public Health Agency of Canada (PHAC) in Winnipeg, Manitoba, for eight years. Kobinger is known for his critical role in the development of both an effective Ebola vaccine and treatment. His work focuses on the development and evaluation of new vaccine platforms and immunological treatments against emerging and re-emerging viruses that are dangerous to human health.

== Biography ==
Kobinger was born in Quebec City, Canada and did his undergraduate degree at Université Laval. He developed his passion for viruses after dropping out of medical school, planting trees for a year, then getting very ill during his travels in India. His goal became to prevent death from emerging infectious disease. He pursued his PhD in microbiology at the University of Montreal, being supervised by Éric A. Cohen, an expert in retroviruses like HIV. He then entered a postdoctoral fellowship at the University of Pennsylvania from 1999-2004, under the supervision of James Wilson (scientist). Here, he generated pseudotyped HIV particles with fragments from ebolavirus. In 2005, he was recruited by PHAC and then became the chief of the Special Pathogens Biosafety Level 4 program at the NML from 2008-2016. It was during this time that he and his team developed both the ZMapp Ebola treatment and the rVSV-ZEBOV Ebola vaccine.

Kobinger and his colleague Xiangguo Qiu won the Governor General's Innovation Award in 2018 for the development of ZMapp, the Ebola antiviral they developed together at the NML. Provided under compassionate emergency protocols during the West African Ebola epidemic in 2014, its first use was on 27 first responders infected in the line of duty, where all but one successfully recovered. Using technologies not widely accepted at the time, ZMapp is made with a cocktail of 3 monoclonal antibodies (shown to be ineffective when used on their own), that target glycoproteins on the virus' outer membrane, which prevent it from replicating. This development has since inspired the research of similar antivirals for other emerging pathogens in different labs around the world.

The NML had been trying to get the rVSV-ZEBOV Ebola vaccine into clinical trials for many years before it was eventually fast-tracked for immediate distribution in 2014, likely saving thousands of lives. Due to the sporadic nature of outbreaks up until this point, and the fact that this pathogen was virtually non-existent in the developed world, pharmaceutical companies had no interest in investing money into developing a vaccine, knowing that they could not recoup the costs. The outbreak in 2014 reminded people that Ebola was both a regional and global threat to public health. Using a vesicular stomatitis virus (VSV) backbone with an added ebolavirus glycoprotein, the NML had a viral vector vaccine ready when the epidemic occurred.

After initially being rejected by the WHO when Kobinger reached out to offer his vaccine, they eventually agreed that there was an "ethical imperative" to try experimental vaccines and therapies, given the large threat that this virus presented. Teaming up with Merck Group, phase 1 clinical trials happened simultaneously in 15 different places around the world, with phase 2 trials occurring in two locations. With positive data from the initial trials, phase 3 trials began in multiple sites in the United States, Canada, Spain, Sierra Leone, Guinea, and Liberia, using an approach known as ring vaccination. It became clear very quickly that the vaccine was working. This whole process happened in less than 12 months. When Ebola broke out in the Democratic Republic of Congo in 2018, the vaccine was again used, this time under the "compassionate use" protocol. On November 11, 2019, Ervebo (rVSV-ZEBOV) was approved by the European Commission and on December 21 of the same year, the FDA gave its approval.

In 2016, Kobinger left the NLM to move back to Quebec to hold the role of Director at the Centre de Recherche en Infectologie (Infectious Diseases Research Center) at Université Laval, where he was also a professor in the Department of Infectious Diseases, Microbiology, and Immunology. As director, his goal was to develop a research framework that can respond rapidly to emerging and re-emerging pathogens. During this time, he was also an assistant professor in the Department of Pathology and Laboratory Medicine at the University of Pennsylvania and an associate professor in the Department of Medical Microbiology at the University of Manitoba.

Kobinger left Canada to become the director of the Galveston National Laboratory at the University of Texas Medical Branch in September 2021, as the result of an international search to fill the position. His switch from a level 3 containment facility at Laval to a level 4 laboratory with "8 times the Canadian capacity in just one facility" allows him to continue his work unrestricted. Facing financial restrictions back at home, amplified by the COVID-19 pandemic, this new role will allow him to pursue his research with far fewer barriers. One of his current goals is to develop a universal coronavirus vaccine in the next handful of years.

== Other activities ==
- Coalition for Epidemic Preparedness Innovations (CEPI), Member of the Scientific Advisory Committee (since 2023)

== Awards and Committees ==
- 2008-2014: WHO co-chair of the Emerging and Dangerous Pathogens Laboratory Global Network for Outbreak Response and Readiness
- 2014: Gully Award
- 2015: Scientist of the Year Award (ICI Radio-Canada)
- 2015: Faculty Teaching Award (University of Manitoba)
- 2016: Meritorious Service Cross (civil division) of the Governor General of Canada
- 2017: Ernest C. Manning Principal Award
- 2018: Governor General’s Innovation Award
- 2020: WHO Strategic and Technical Advisory Group for Infectious Hazards; expert in Viral Hemorrhagic Fever
- WHO Ad hoc advisor to the Strategic Advisory Group of Exports on Immunization (SAGE) committee
- WHO High Priority Pathogens committee
- Advisor to the WHO Deputy Director-General, Emergency Preparedness and Response
