= Dawna Friesen =

Canadian television journalist (born 1964)

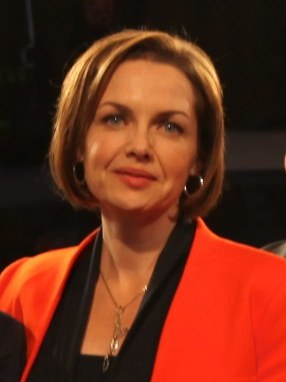
- Friesen in 2011
- Born: October 8, 1964 (age 62); Winnipeg, Manitoba, Canada
- Status: Global National anchor and executive anchor (2010–present)
- Education: Red River College Polytechnic
- Occupation: News anchor
- Years active: 1985–present
- Notable credit(s): CTV NewsNet anchor (1997–1999); NBC News foreign correspondent (1999–2010); Global National anchor and executive editor (2010–present)
- Title: News anchor and executive editor of Global National
- Spouse(s): Tom Kennedy (? – 2018); Rick Anderson (2018–)
- Children: 1

Dawna Friesen (born October 8, 1964) is a Canadian television journalist, currently the chief anchor and executive editor of Global National. She was previously a foreign correspondent for NBC News.

== Career ==
Friesen started reading news at a hybrid television and radio station in Brandon, Manitoba in 1985; from there, she went on to report for other stations in Thunder Bay, Winnipeg, Saskatoon, Calgary, Vancouver, and Toronto.

By the late 1990s, Friesen was recruited by national networks in Canada and the US and joined NBC News. While at NBC, Friesen covered stories out of London as well as the Middle East, including the Israeli Palestinian conflict and the wars in Afghanistan and Iraq, and the kidnapping and murder of The Wall Street Journal reporter Daniel Pearl in Karachi. She won a News & Documentary Emmy Award as a correspondent in NBC's coverage of the 2008 United States presidential election.

In 2010, Friesen joined Global News as their Global National anchor, succeeding Kevin Newman. Friesen was the third full-time female news anchor to lead a nightly newscast in Canada, after Sophie Thibault in 2002 and Céline Galipeau in 2009; she was the first in English Canada. In 2011, she won the Gemini Award for best news anchor.

In addition to Global National, she also hosts the network's newsmagazine series The New Reality.

== Personal life ==
Friesen was raised on a farm west of Winnipeg; her parents were nonobservant Mennonites. Her father had her work on the farm, and she learned how to drive a tractor when she was six. Her mother was active in local politics. She moved with her family to St. Albert, Alberta and graduated from Paul Kane High School in 1981. She then moved back to Manitoba to attend Red River College and worked as a waitress when she was young. Friesen graduated from RRC's Creative Communications program in 1984, and began her journalism career working in Brandon, Saskatoon, Thunder Bay and Winnipeg. She re-married on July 28, 2018, to Rick Anderson after she divorced Tom Kennedy.

Both of her parents developed dementia; in 2014, Friesen was featured in a 16×9 program about dementia and how families cope with it.

== Awards ==
- 2009 News & Documentary Emmy Award for Outstanding Live Coverage of a Breaking News Story – Long Form, as a correspondent in NBC's coverage of the 2008 United States presidential election.
- 2011 Gemini Award, best news anchor
- 2026 Canadian Screen Award, best news anchor, national
