= Rick Anderson (political strategist) =

Canadian political strategist, public affairs commentator and businessman

Rick Anderson is a Canadian political strategist, public affairs commentator and public affairs consultant.

== Life and career ==
Anderson, a native of Montreal and Valleyfield, Quebec, was initially drawn to the Liberal Party of Pierre Elliott Trudeau. His first campaign experience was in the 1974 federal election, working in Ottawa West for Lloyd Francis, the Liberal candidate and past MP who won re-election that year. As a young Liberal, Anderson subsequently worked at the national headquarters of the Liberal Party of Canada from 1974–1976, during the tenure of Senator Gil Molgat as party president and Blair Williams as National Director. In 1976 Anderson moved to Parliament Hill as a special assistant to cabinet minister Judd Buchanan of London West, and then worked on Prime Minister Trudeau's election tour in the 1979 election. Anderson remained actively involved in the Liberal Party on a volunteer basis throughout the 1980s, assisting in several campaigns including those of Ontario Liberal leader Stuart Smith and Ontario Premier David Peterson.

Anderson served as campaign manager for the 1984 Liberal leadership campaign of Don Johnston, assisted with Prime Minister John Turner's 1984 campaign, and supported Paul Martin in the Liberal Party's 1990 leadership election.

With the Liberals' 1990 selection of Jean Chrétien as leader, Anderson moved away from the Liberal Party, and within a couple of years became heavily involved with the newly emerging Reform Party of Canada.

Although by then a Reform supporter, Anderson did not share the party's deep opposition to the constitutional reforms known as the Charlottetown Accord. Instead, during the 1992 referendum he campaigned on behalf of the unusuccesful Yes side, working with Tom d'Acquino and business leaders in what was then known as the BCNI.

Under Reform leader Preston Manning, Anderson directed Reform's national campaigns in the 1993 election and in the 1997 election, as the party grew from a single seat in Parliament to Official Opposition. In the 1993 campaign, he worked very closely with party chairman and later campaign chairman Cliff Fryers, with key early MPs such as Diane Ablonczy, Deb Grey, Chuck Strahl, Monte Solberg, Jay Hill, Elwin Hermanson and with key party executives such as Gordon Shaw, Neil Weir, Virgil Anderson and Glenn McMurray. Despite early differences in approach with key players such as Tom Flanagan (who left the party headquarters staff) and Stephen Harper (who left Parliament in early 1997), by the 1997 campaign the core campaign team had expanded to include veteran MP John Reynolds, pollster Andre Turcotte, advertising executive Bryan Thomas, Jim Armour, Phil von Finckenstein, Kory Teneycke, Stephen Greene, Darrel Reid, Morten Paulsen, Lisa Samson, Ian Todd, Ellen Todd, Paul Wilson, Nathalie Stirling, Nancy Brancombe, and a number of other young staff and candidates who continued on to become key players in subsequent campaigns and in the future Conservative government.

Between the 1993 and 1997 campaigns, Anderson acted as a Reform ambassador to provincial governments and to the business community, working to thaw historically-chilly relations with the new party. Early relationships forged with Ontario Conservative leader Mike Harris and key lieutenants Tony Clement and Tom Long assisted Harris's election as Ontario Premier and laid the groundwork for future collaboration. Improved relations were also established with key figures in the campaign teams of Alberta Premier Ralph Klein and future BC Premier Gordon Campbell.

Following the 1997 election, from 1998 to 2000 Anderson was a leader in the Reform Party's United Alternative campaign to "unite the right". Other key Reformers who were involved in that campaign included Cliff Fryers, Deb Grey, John Reynolds, Jason Kenney, Nancy Branscombe and Ken Kalopsis. Key Conservatives included Peter White, Tony Clement, Tom Long, Thompson MacDonald, Rod Love, Michael Fortier, Don Morgan, Bob Dechert, John Capobianco and Sandra Buckler. Alberta Premier Ralph Klein and Ontario Premier Mike Harris were quiet but key backers of the reconciliation initiative.

After the morphing of Reform into its new incarnation as the Canadian Alliance in 2000, and following the new party's disappointing 2000 election results, Anderson and newly elected leader Stockwell Day were publicly critical of one another, with Anderson leaving the new party's executive, the party fracturing, and Day eventually resigning. Stephen Harper succeeded Day, reunited the Alliance and the Progressive Conservative Party into today's Conservative Party, and went on to become Prime Minister in the 2006 federal election.

Anderson has been a member of the board of the Manning Centre for Building Democracy. He is a supporter of democratic reform, including Senate reform and more proportional representation. Since 2003, he has served on the board of directors and advisory board of Fair Vote Canada. In 2007, he was campaign chair of the YES side in Ontario's provincial referendum on MMP, which had been recommended by the Ontario Citizens Assembly on Electoral Reform.

Professionally, Anderson served as an executive with Hill & Knowlton and predecessor companies from 1980 to 1995, in Ottawa and Toronto, Canada; London, England; and Washington, DC. He left H&K in 1995 to launch his own consulting practice, ASCI Anderson Strategic Consulting Inc. From 2004 to 2008, Anderson served as president and CEO of Zip.ca, a Canadian online DVD rental company. Anderson is currently EVP of Interborder Holdings Ltd, parent of Walton International in Calgary, Alberta.

Since 1993, Anderson has been a frequent commentator on national affairs, including with CTV's Canada AM, CBC Radio's As It Happens, CBC TV's Newsworld, the Toronto Star, Edmonton Journal, Ottawa Citizen and CBC's The National. During the 2006 Canadian federal election campaign, CBC's The National had a recurring feature throughout the campaign entitled "Campaign Confidential", in which an unidentified "former campaigner", who was actually Anderson, provided detailed written analyses of the campaign which were then read by an actor on television. The identity of Anderson as the analyst was revealed on-air by Peter Mansbridge on January 24, 2006, the day after the election.

For the 2008 election campaign, Anderson was on CBC's The National along with David Herle, as one of "The Insiders" commenting on-air and on the CBC's website regarding the unfolding campaign.

Anderson subsequently provided political commentary on CBC Newsworld's Politics broadcast, hosted by Don Newman, and authored a blog for The Globe and Mail.

Rick currently focuses on advising clients involved in the global energy transition, as Principal of e4 Strategies Inc.
