= Howard Crosby =

Howard Crosby may refer to:

- Howard Crosby (minister) (1826–1891), American minister, teacher and President of New York University
- Howard Edward Crosby (1933–2003), member of Canadian Parliament
