= Jason MacDonald (disambiguation) =

Jason MacDonald (born 1975) is a Canadian former mixed martial artist.

Jason MacDonald may also refer to:

- Jason MacDonald (ice hockey) (born 1974), Canadian ice hockey winger
- Jason MacDonald (politician), Canadian director of communications
- Jason Macdonald (born 1980), rugby union player
- Jason McDonald (born 1972), American baseball player
