= Canadian House of Commons Standing Committee on Public Accounts =

Standing committee of the House of Commons of Canada

The House of Commons Standing Committee on Public Accounts (PACP) is a standing committee of the House of Commons of Canada. It reviews the Auditor General's reports. It is one of four standing committees of the House that is chaired by a member of the opposition.

== Mandate ==
The Public Accounts Committee's mandate is to "review of and report on the Public Accounts of Canada and all reports of the Auditor General of Canada." It also reviews the government's consolidated financial statements, as well as other matters referred to it by the House.

Whenever, the Speaker tables a report from the Auditor General, the report is automatically referred to the Public Accounts Committee. The committee then calls witnesses to respond to the report's findings. Once their study is concluded, the committee may present a report to the House with recommendations for improvement to government programs.

The committee does not normally weigh in on what the government's policy goals should be, but focusses on the efficiency of government programs at achieving the goals set by the government.

== Membership ==
As of the 45th Canadian Parliament:

Party	Member	District
Conservative	John Williamson, chair	Saint John—St. Croix, NB
Liberal	Jean Yip, vice chair	Scarborough—Agincourt, ON
Bloc Québécois	Sébastien Lemire, vice chair	Abitibi—Témiscamingue, QC
Conservative	Gérard Deltell	Louis-Saint-Laurent—Akiawenhrahk, QC
Liberal	Anthony Housefather	Mount Royal, QC
Conservative	Ned Kuruc	Hamilton East—Stoney Creek, ON
Conservative	Stephanie Kusie	Calgary Midnapore, AB
Liberal	Tom Osborne	Cape Spear, NL
Liberal	Kristina Tesser Derksen	Milton East—Halton Hills South, ON

== History ==
Under the Westminster system, governments cannot spend money or raise taxes without the consent of Parliament. This requires public accounting to ensure Parliament's intent is fulfilled. This has traditionally been done by a public accounts committee.

In Canada, the Public Accounts Committee has existed since Confederation in 1867 and is the successor to previous bodies that had a similar function.

=== 44th Parliament ===
==== Membership ====
The membership of the committee at the time of prorogation on January 6, 2025 is as follow.

Party	Member	District
Liberal	Jean Yip, Vice-Chair	Scarborough—Agincourt, ON
Liberal	Valerie Bradford	Kitchener South—Hespeler, ON
Liberal	Iqra Khalid	Mississauga—Erin Mills, ON
Liberal	Francis Drouin	Glengarry—Prescott—Russell, ON
Liberal	Hon. Nathaniel Erskine-Smith	Beaches—East York, ON
Conservative	John Williamson, Chair	New Brunswick Southwest, NB
Conservative	John Nater	Perth—Wellington, ON
Conservative	Jake Stewart	Miramichi—Grand Lake, NB
Conservative	Kelly McCauley	Edmonton West, AB
Bloc	Nathalie Sinclair-Desgagné, Vice-Chair	Terrebonne, QC
New Democratic	Richard Cannings	South Okanagan—West Kootenay, BC

==== Work ====
On December 16, 2021, Tom Kmiec was elected chair of the committee. Kmiec left the committee on February 28, 2022 and John Williamson was elected chair the next day.

Under Williamson, the Public Accounts Committee studied a wide range of issues, most notably the outsourcing on government contracts related to ArriveCAN, the investigation into conflicts of interest at Sustainable Development Technology Canada, and audits of the government's COVID-19 programs.

On December 27, 2024, Williamson used his ability as chair to schedule a committee meeting on January 7, 2025, to discuss "a motion of non-confidence in the Liberal Government." However, the day before the scheduled meeting, Justin Trudeau prorogued Parliament, cancelling all business of the House, including scheduled committee meetings.

Throughout the 1st Session of the 44th Parliament, the committee held 159 meetings and published a total of 44 reports.

== Subcommittees ==
- Subcommittee on Agenda and Procedure (SPAC)
