= William Stairs =

William Stairs is the name of:

- William Grant Stairs (1863–1892), Canadian-British soldier and explorer of Africa
- William James Stairs (1819–1906), Canadian merchant, banker, politician
- William J. Stairs (born 1956), Canadian political consultant
- William Machin Stairs (1789–1865), Canadian merchant, banker and statesman
