= Liaison Committee =

The Liaison Committee may refer to the:

- Liaison Committee (House of Commons of the United Kingdom)
- Liaison Committee (House of Lords of the United Kingdom)
- Liaison Committee (House of Commons of Canada)
- "The Liaison Committee", an episode of Yanks Go Home
