= Geoff Regan =

Canadian politician (born 1959)

The Honourable Geoff Regan PC
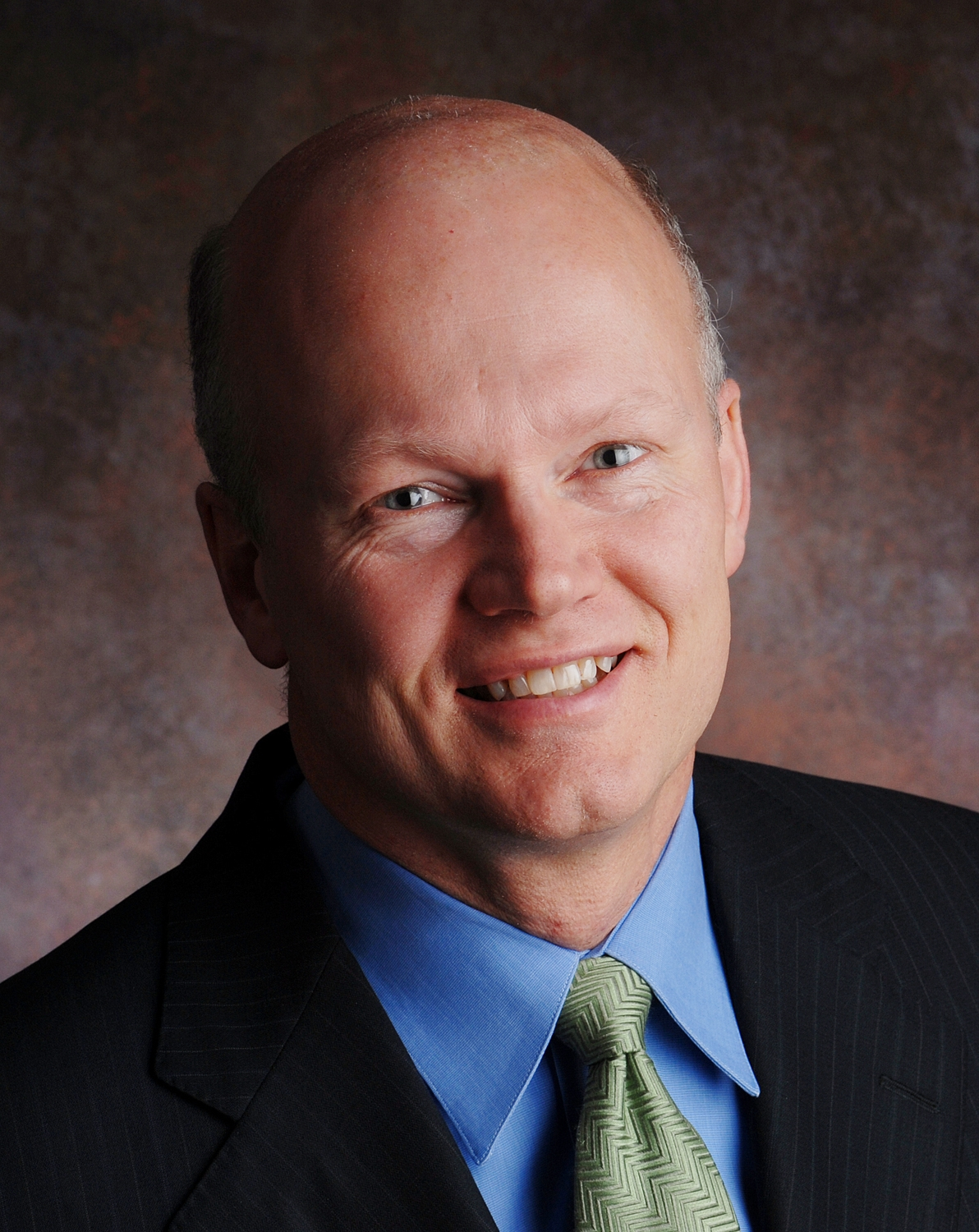
- Regan in 2008

36th Speaker of the House of Commons
- In office December 3, 2015 – December 5, 2019
- Preceded by: Andrew Scheer
- Succeeded by: Anthony Rota

Chairman of the Special Committee on Canada-China Relations
- In office January 20, 2020 – August 15, 2021
- Preceded by: Position established
- Succeeded by: Vacant

Minister of Fisheries and Oceans
- In office December 12, 2003 – February 5, 2006
- Prime Minister: Paul Martin
- Preceded by: Robert Thibault
- Succeeded by: Loyola Hearn

Parliamentary Secretary to the Leader of the Government in the House of Commons
- In office September 13, 2001 – December 11, 2003
- Prime Minister: Jean Chrétien
- Preceded by: Derek Lee
- Succeeded by: Roger Gallaway

Member of Parliament for Halifax West
- In office November 27, 2000 – September 20, 2021
- Preceded by: Gordon Earle
- Succeeded by: Lena Diab
- In office October 25, 1993 – June 2, 1997
- Preceded by: Howard Edward Crosby
- Succeeded by: Gordon Earle

Personal details
- Born: Geoffrey Paul Regan; November 22, 1959 (age 66) Windsor, Nova Scotia, Canada
- Party: Liberal
- Spouse: Kelly Smith (m. 1993)
- Parents: Gerald Regan (father); Carole Harrison (mother)
- Relatives: John Harrison (grandfather); Nancy Regan (sister); Laura Regan (sister)
- Education: St. Francis Xavier University (BA); Dalhousie University
- Profession: Lawyer
- Website: www.geoffregan.ca

Geoffrey Paul Regan PC (born November 22, 1959) is a retired Canadian politician who served as the 36th speaker of the House of Commons from 2015 to 2019. A member of the Liberal Party, he was the Member of Parliament (MP) for Halifax West from 2000 to 2021, previously holding the seat from 1993 to 1997. Under Paul Martin, he was Minister of Fisheries and Oceans from 2003 to 2006.

== Early life and career ==
Regan was born in Windsor, Nova Scotia. He is the son of Gerald Regan, the 19th premier of Nova Scotia and Cabinet Minister under Pierre Trudeau, and Carole Harrison, the daughter of John Harrison, a member of Parliament from Saskatchewan. He is the brother of Nancy Regan, a retired television personality with ATV, and Laura Regan, an actress.

Regan graduated from Sackville High School in 1977 and then earned his Bachelor of Arts degree in Political Science from St. Francis Xavier University in 1980. Following university, Regan went on to earn a law degree from Dalhousie University, graduating in 1983. He was admitted to the Nova Scotia Barristers’ Society in 1984 and practiced real estate and commercial law before entering public life.

Regan was a member of Toastmasters for almost ten years, in the late 1980s to early 1990s.

== Federal politics ==
Regan was first elected to the House of Commons as part of the Liberal victory in the 1993 federal election under Jean Chrétien. He was defeated in the 1997 election by NDP candidate Gordon Earle, mainly because of the federal government's changes to employment insurance.

After regaining his seat in the 2000 federal election, Regan was appointed Parliamentary Secretary to the Leader of the Government in the House of Commons, a position then held by Don Boudria. In 2003, Paul Martin appointed him as Minister of Fisheries and Oceans.

Regan was the Regional Minister for Nova Scotia in the newly formed government of Paul Martin, sworn in on 12 December 2003. Regan was re-elected in the 2004 federal election. He would keep position in cabinet in Martin’s minority government. In February 2004, Regan was appointed to act as Minister of Justice and Attorney General of Canada, in matters related to Maher Arar.

=== In opposition ===
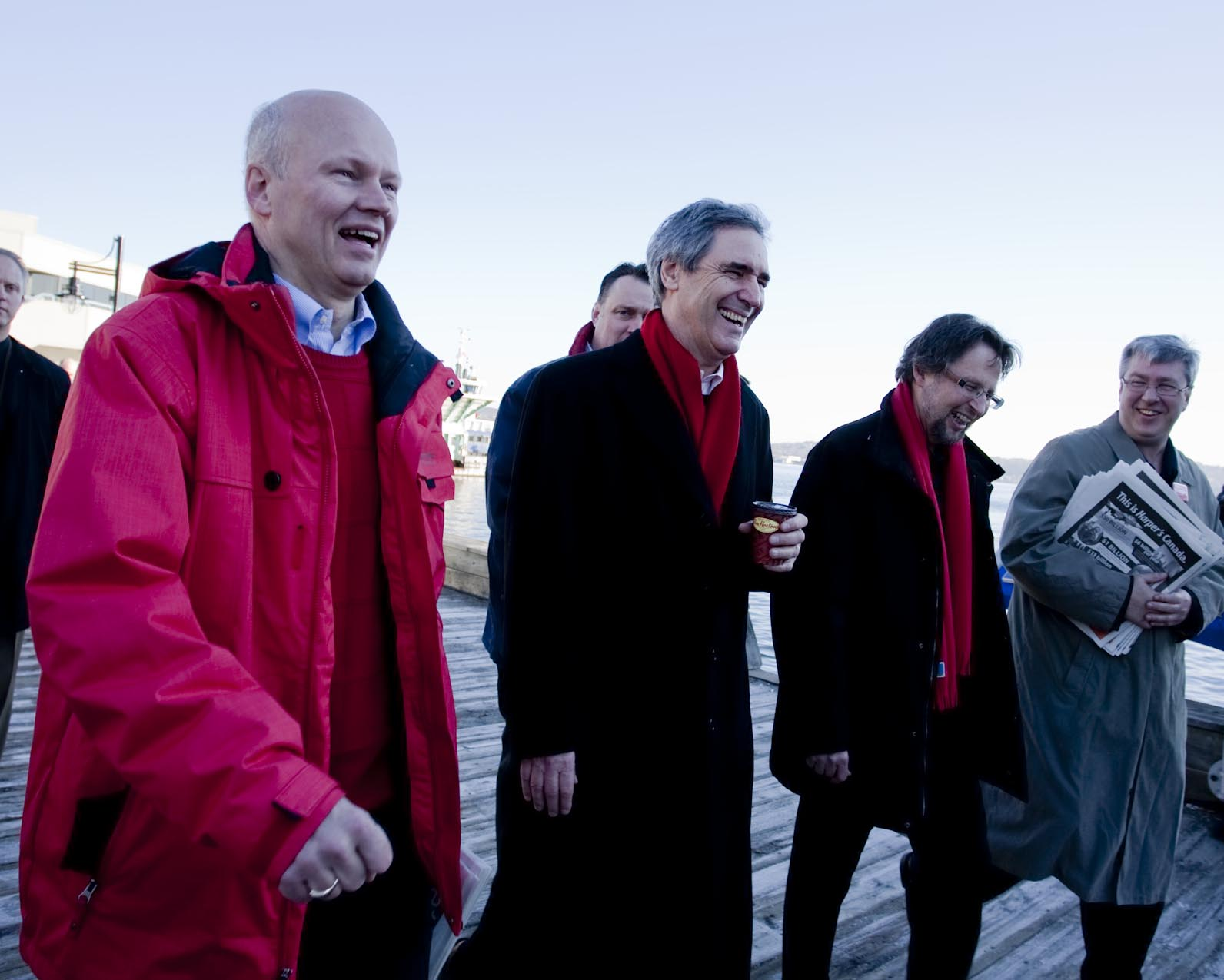
Regan with Liberal leader Michael Ignatieff during the 2011 federal election campaign

Upon the defeat of the Liberal government in the 2006 election, he was appointed by Bill Graham, Interim Leader of the Official Opposition, to the shadow cabinet as the Official Opposition Critic for Human Resources and Skills Development. During his time as critic, Regan introduced a private members’ bill to expand Canada Access Grants for disabled and low income students. In January 2007, he was appointed to the newly created Liberal Priorities and Planning Committee, which was chaired by then Liberal Opposition Leader Stéphane Dion. In March 2008, Regan was named Chair of the Caucus Committee on Environmental Sustainability. Regan also served as Vice-Chair of the House of Commons Standing Committee on Environment and Sustainable Development.

Regan was re-elected in 2008, and 2011 federal elections, despite significant Liberal losses in both. Regan won his seat by a few percentage points in the latter election as the Liberals finished in third place. Under the leadership of Stephane Dion, Regan served as Opposition Critic for Human Resources and Skills Development. Under Michael Ignatieff, Regan served as Liberal Critic for Natural Resources, and later, Public Works and Government Services and also as the Liberal Natural Resources Critic under leader Justin Trudeau and the Vice-Chair of the Standing Committee on Natural Resources.

=== Speaker of the House of Commons ===
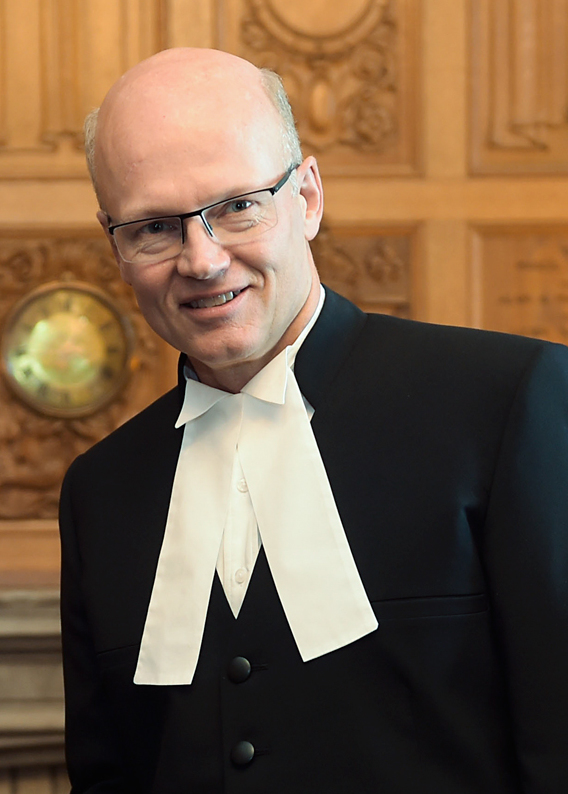
Regan as Speaker in 2016.

Regan was re-elected in the 2015 federal election with 68% of the vote as the Liberal party swept all 32 Atlantic Canada seats and formed a majority government. On 2 December 2015, Regan was selected as Speaker of the House of Commons in secret ballot by members of the 42nd Parliament over Liberals Denis Paradis and Yasmin Ratansi and Conservative Bruce Stanton. Regan won on the first ballot and served as the first speaker from Atlantic Canada in almost a hundred years. In December 2019, he ran for re-election for Speaker of the Commons but lost to fellow Liberal MP Anthony Rota. Following Rota's win, the Conservatives said that he had them to thank for his new position. They had made the decision during a caucus meeting to unseat Regan as a show of strength to the Liberal minority government.

On March 31, 2021, Regan announced that he would not seek re-election.

== Awards and honours ==
- Metro Food Bank Society Community Leadership Award (1992)
- Halifax Board of Trade Certificate of Merit (1992)
- Queen Elizabeth II Golden Jubilee Medal (2002)
- Appointed member of the Queen’s Privy Council for Canada (2003)
- Elisabeth Mann Borgese Medal (2005) The International Ocean Institute awarded Regan then Minister of Fisheries and Oceans for his "exemplary leadership in the field of Ocean Governance."
- Lebanese Community Recognition Award (2008)
- Queen Elizabeth II Diamond Jubilee Medal (2012)
- Queen Elizabeth II Platinum Jubilee Medal (2022)

== Personal life ==
Regan's wife, Kelly Regan, is a provincial MLA and former Deputy Premier of Nova Scotia.

== Electoral record ==
2019 Canadian federal election: Halifax West
Party	Candidate	Votes	%	±%	Expenditures
Liberal	Geoff Regan	26,885	49.46	−19.19	$47,993.19
Conservative	Fred Shuman	10,488	19.29	+3.64	$56,155.00
New Democratic	Jacob Wilson	10,429	19.19	+7.42	$3,588.81
Green	Richard Zurawski	6,555	12.06	+8.12	$1,525.90
Total valid votes/expense limit		54,357	99.15		$103,859.40
Total rejected ballots		465	0.85	+0.49	
Turnout		54,822	70.71	−1.00	
Eligible voters		77,531			
Liberal hold		Swing		−11.42	
Source: Elections Canada

2015 Canadian federal election: Halifax West
Party	Candidate	Votes	%	±%	Expenditures
Liberal	Geoff Regan	34,377	68.65	+31.38	$51,596.91
Conservative	Michael McGinnis	7,837	15.65	–14.53	$34,660.89
New Democratic	Joanne Hussey	5,894	11.77	–16.68	$38,094.46
Green	Richard Henryk Zurawski	1,971	3.94	–0.17	$258.75
Total valid votes/expense limit		50,079	100.00		$203,472.37
Total rejected ballots		181	0.36		
Turnout		50,260	71.71		
Eligible voters		70,089			
Liberal hold		Swing		+22.95	
Source: Elections Canada

2011 Canadian federal election: Halifax West
Party	Candidate	Votes	%	±%	Expenditures
Liberal	Geoff Regan	16,230	35.92	-5.64	$61,795.88
Conservative	Bruce Pretty	13,782	30.50	+9.37	$51,236.29
New Democratic	Gregor Ash	13,239	29.30	-0.30	$42,761.72
Green	Thomas Trappenberg	1,931	4.27	-2.81	$860.31
Total valid votes/expense limit		45,182	100.0		$84,619.08
Total rejected, unmarked and declined ballots		239	0.53	+0.16	
Turnout		45,421	62.34	+3.21	
Eligible voters		72,862			
Liberal hold		Swing		-7.47	

2008 Canadian federal election: Halifax West
Party	Candidate	Votes	%	±%	Expenditures
Liberal	Geoff Regan	17,129	41.56	-7.80	$50,515.55
New Democratic	Tamara Lorincz	12,201	29.60	+5.17	$25,480.72
Conservative	Rakesh Khosla	8,708	21.13	-1.91	$29,390.36
Green	Michael Munday	2,920	7.08	+3.90	$2,823.08
Christian Heritage	Trevor Ennis	257	0.62	–	$123.50
Total valid votes/expense limit		41,215	100.0		$81,056
Total rejected, unmarked and declined ballots		154	0.37	+0.04	
Turnout		41,369	59.13	-3.92	
Eligible voters		69,960			
Liberal hold		Swing		-6.48	

2006 Canadian federal election: Halifax West
Party	Candidate	Votes	%	±%	Expenditures
Liberal	Geoff Regan	21,818	49.36	+1.86	$54,533.58
New Democratic	Alan Hill	10,798	24.43	-3.52	$15,656.30
Conservative	Rakesh Khosla	10,184	23.04	+2.10	$46,536.45
Green	Thomas Trappenberg	1,406	3.18	-0.43	$642.68
Total valid votes/expense limit		44,206	100.0		$75,552
Total rejected, unmarked and declined ballots		147	0.33	-0.02	
Turnout		44,353	63.05	-0.46	
Eligible voters		70,349			
Liberal hold		Swing		+2.69	

2004 Canadian federal election: Halifax West
Party	Candidate	Votes	%	±%	Expenditures
Liberal	Geoff Regan	19,083	47.50	+6.55	$60,896.27
New Democratic	Bill Carr	11,228	27.95	-0.12	$33,350.95
Conservative	Ken MacPhee	8,413	20.94	-9.26	$32,442.47
Green	Martin Willison	1,452	3.61	–	$1,152.00
Total valid votes/expense limit		40,176	100.0		$71,525
Total rejected, unmarked and declined ballots		141	0.35		
Turnout		40,317	63.51	+3.64	
Eligible voters		63,479			
Liberal notional hold		Swing		+3.34	
Changes from 2000 are based on redistributed results. Conservative Party change is based on the combination of Canadian Alliance and Progressive Conservative Party totals.

2000 Canadian federal election: Halifax West
Party	Candidate	Votes	%	±%
Liberal	Geoff Regan	18,327	39.21	+8.32
New Democratic	Gordon Earle	14,016	29.99	-4.64
Progressive Conservative	Charles Cirtwill	9,701	20.76	-2.70
Alliance	Hilda Stevens	4,531	9.70	-0.77
Marxist–Leninist	Tony Seed	160	0.34	+0.19
Total valid votes		46,735	100.00	
Liberal gain from New Democratic		Swing		+6.48

Changes for the Canadian Alliance from 1997 are based on the results of its predecessor, the Reform Party.

1997 Canadian federal election: Halifax West
Party	Candidate	Votes	%	±%
New Democratic	Gordon Earle	16,013	34.63	+26.23
Liberal	Geoff Regan	14,284	30.89	-14.73
Progressive Conservative	Heather Foley	10,848	23.46	-0.29
Reform	Stephen Oickle	4,843	10.47	-8.93
Natural Law	John Runkle	179	0.39	-0.42
Marxist–Leninist	Gary Zatzman	70	0.15	
Total valid votes		46,237	100.00	
New Democratic gain from Liberal		Swing		+20.48

1993 Canadian federal election: Halifax West
Party	Candidate	Votes	%	±%
Liberal	Geoff Regan	26 904	45.62	+7.01
Progressive Conservative	Joel Matheson	14 005	23.75	-21.00
Reform	Jim Donohue	11,439	19.40	
New Democratic	Sheila Richardson	4,952	8.40	-7.85
National	Kirby Judge	1,201	2.04	
Natural Law	Bernard Gormley	475	0.81	
Total valid votes		58,976	100.00	
Liberal gain from Progressive Conservative		Swing		+14.01

Parliament of Canada
Preceded by Howard Edward Crosby	Member of Parliament for Halifax West; 1993–1997	Succeeded by Gordon Earle
Preceded by Gordon Earle	Member of Parliament for Halifax West; 2000–present	Incumbent
Preceded by Andrew Scheer	Speaker of the House of Commons of Canada; 2015–2019	Succeeded by Anthony Rota
Political offices
Preceded by Robert Thibault	Minister of Fisheries and Oceans; 2003–2006	Succeeded by Loyola Hearn
