= Karen Ludwig =

Karen Ludwig may refer to:

- Karen Ludwig (politician)
- Karen Ludwig (actress)
