= Canadian House of Commons Special Committee on Canada-China Relations =

Special committee of the House of Commons of Canada

The House of Commons Special Committee on Canada-China Relations (CACN) is a special committee of the House of Commons of Canada. It was established in the 43rd Canadian Parliament in 2019.

== Mandate ==
- "conduct hearings to examine and review all aspects of the Canada–China relationship, including, but not limited to, consular, economic, legal, security and diplomatic relations."

== Membership ==
Party	Member	District
Liberal	Geoff Regan, chair	Halifax West, NS
Liberal	Emmanuel Dubourg	Bourassa, QC
Liberal	Peter Fragiskatos	London North Centre, ON
Liberal	Robert Oliphant	Don Valley West, ON
Liberal	Jean Yip	Scarborough—Agincourt, ON
Liberal	Lenore Zann	Cumberland—Colchester, NS
Conservative	Dan Albas, vice-chair	Central Okanagan—Similkameen—Nicola, BC
Conservative	Leona Alleslev	Aurora—Oak Ridges—Richmond Hill, ON
Conservative	Garnett Genuis	Sherwood Park—Fort Saskatchewan, AB
Conservative	John Williamson	New Brunswick Southwest, NB
New Democratic	Jack Harris, vice-chair	St. John's East, NL
Bloc Quebecois	Stéphane Bergeron, vice-chair	Montarville, QC

== Subcommittees ==
- Subcommittee on Agenda and Procedure (SCAC)
