= Angelo Persichilli =

Director of communications in the Prime Minister's Office

Director of Communications to the Prime Minister of Canada
- In office 2011–2012
- Prime Minister: Stephen Harper
- Preceded by: Dimitri Soudas
- Succeeded by: Andrew MacDougall

Personal details
- Born: 1948 (age 77–78) Campobasso, Italy
- Party: Conservative Party of Canada
- Profession: Communications Executive

Angelo Persichilli (born 1948) is an Italian born Canadian journalist and newspaper editor who emigrated from Italy to Canada in 1975.

== Director of Communications ==
He was announced in August 2011 as the new director of communications in the Prime Minister's Office, but resigned in March 2012 after less than a year in the job.

He was the first director of communications to not speak both French and English, Canada's official languages, which prompted an official complaint with the Canadian Human Rights Commission.

Prior to joining the PMO, Persichilli worked as a columnist for the Toronto Star, and as an editor of the Italian language newspaper Corriere Canadese. He was previously also a producer of multilingual newscasts on OMNI Television.

On March 8, 2013, Persichilli was appointed as a citizenship judge for the Greater Toronto Area.
