= Mario Laguë =

Mario Laguë (1958 – August 12, 2010) was a Canadian diplomat and public servant. He served as ambassador to Costa Rica, Honduras and Nicaragua, and at the time of his death, he was the communications director for the Liberal Party of Canada.

== Career ==
Laguë spent the early years of his career in Quebec politics, working closely with the Quebec Liberal party. In the 1990s, he joined the Privy Council Office in Intergovernmental Affairs to specifically work on the unity file. He was named Assistant Secretary to the Cabinet (Communications) in 1999, which is the most senior communications position in government. In 2003, he was named incoming Prime Minister Paul Martin's Director of Communications, a post he held until 2005, when he was named by Martin as the Ambassador to Costa Rica, with concurrent accreditation to Honduras and Nicaragua.

Following his diplomatic appointment, he joined the International Union for Conservation of Nature near Geneva, before returning to Ottawa in 2009 to take the job of Director of Communications to Liberal Leader Michael Ignatieff.

== Death ==
Laguë was killed on the morning of August 12, 2010, when his motorcycle crashed into an SUV, in Ottawa, Ontario, Canada, as he was on his way to work. He died at the age of 52 leaving behind his wife, novelist Caroline Vu, and two children.

Diplomatic posts
Preceded by Louise Legér	Ambassador Extraordinary and Plenipotentiary to Honduras and Nicaragua; 2005–2007	Succeeded by ?

Diplomatic posts
Preceded by Louise Legér	Ambassador Extraordinary and Plenipotentiary to Costa Rica; 2004–2007	Succeeded by ?
