= Dimitri Soudas =

Director of communications to the prime minister of canada

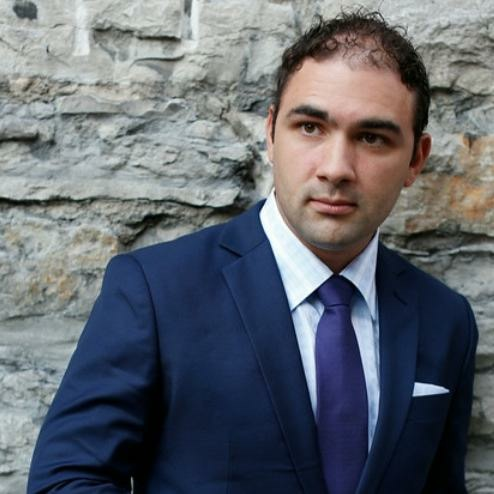

Director of Communications to the Prime Minister of Canada
- In office 2010–2011
- Prime Minister: Stephen Harper
- Preceded by: John Williamson
- Succeeded by: Angelo Persichilli

Personal details
- Born: July 10, 1979 (age 46) Montreal, Quebec, Canada

Dimitri Soudas (born July 10, 1979) is the former Director of Communications to the Canadian Prime Minister Stephen Harper, former executive director of the Canadian Olympic Committee and former executive director of the Conservative Party of Canada.

Soudas is the former executive director (Communications) and Press Chief of the Canadian Olympic Committee.

== Career ==
Between 2006 and 2011, Soudas was a "high profile" member of Prime Minister Stephen Harper's communication team, and one of the Prime Minister's "closest and most faithful aides". Initially serving as a Press Secretary and later as an associate director of Communications for the prime minister's office, Soudas was appointed as Director of Communications for the prime minister's office following the resignation of his predecessor, John Williamson, in the spring of 2010. On June 1, 2011, Soudas revealed he would be stepping down as Harper's chief spokesman. He was succeeded by Angelo Persichilli.

Beginning in October 2011, Soudas served as executive director of Communications for the Canadian Olympic Committee.

In December 2013, Soudas resigned from the Canadian Olympic Committee, and was appointed executive director of the Conservative Party of Canada. In March 2014, Harper demanded Soudas's resignation after allegations emerged that Soudas had used party resources to help his fiancée, Eve Adams, in her bid for the Conservative nomination in Oakville North—Burlington. On February 9, 2015, Eve Adams crossed the floor to join the Liberal Party caucus.

Soudas is the former Managing Partner of Stampede Group, which specializes in food trade into Asian markets and business development. He also served as Executive Vice President of Business Affairs and Corporate Sponsorship for the World Equestrian Games.

Soudas serves as chairman of the Board of Merry Montreal, a not-for-profit organization that organizes a holiday event in Montreal.

== Awards ==
- Queen's Diamond Jubilee Medal (2012)
- "Lifetime Honorary Board Member" of the National Ethnic Press and Media Council of Canada (2010)
