= Karen Ludwig (politician) =

Canadian politician

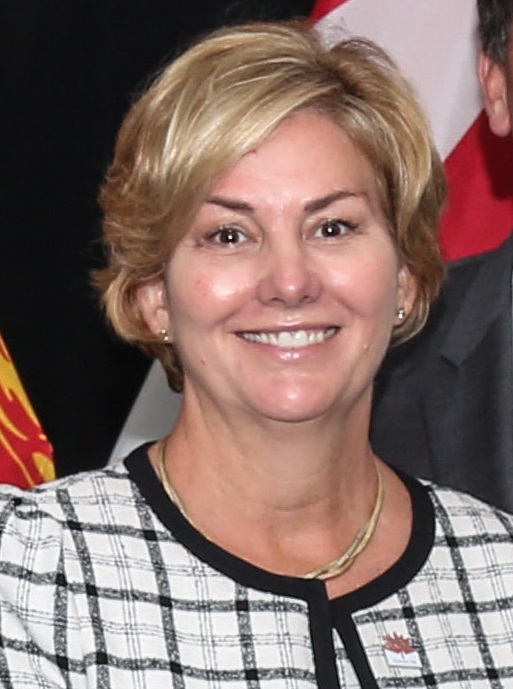

Member of Parliament for New Brunswick Southwest
- In office October 19, 2015 – October 21, 2019
- Preceded by: John Williamson
- Succeeded by: John Williamson

Personal details
- Born: May 13, 1964 (age 62) Ontario
- Party: Liberal
- Spouse: Andrew Ludwig

Karen Ludwig (born May 13, 1964) is a Canadian Liberal politician who represented the riding of New Brunswick Southwest in the House of Commons of Canada from 2015 until 2019. She was the first woman to represent the riding.

== Background ==
Ludwig moved from Ontario to Saint Andrews, New Brunswick, in 1988 when her husband, Andrew took a job in the aquaculture industry. Prior to entering politics, Ludwig was a business owner, associate dean, university professor, and international exporter. She has a Master of Arts and Master of Education degree, as well as a CITP designation. Ludwig joined the Faculty of Business Administration at the University of New Brunswick in 2002. In 2009, she was nominated for the Allan P. Stuart Award for Excellence in Teaching at UNB, and in 2012, Ludwig was presented with a Departmental Award in Teaching Excellence for her teaching of International Trade in their MBA Program. She is a mother of two children.

== Federal politics ==
Ludwig was elected to represent the riding of New Brunswick Southwest in the House of Commons of Canada in the 2015 federal election. She was the first woman to win in the riding, traditionally seen as a Conservative stronghold.

=== Roles in the House of Commons ===
- From 2015-2019, Ludwig was nominated as the Chair of the New Brunswick Caucus.
- From 2016-2017, Ludwig was a member of the Standing Committee on the Status of Women.
- From 2016-2019, Ludwig was a member of the Standing Committee on International Trade.
- From 2018-2019, Ludwig was elected twice as Vice-Chair of the Canada-US Inter Parliamentary Group.
- From 2018-2019, Ludwig was a member of the Standing Committee on Veterans Affairs.

To view all roles held by MP Karen Ludwig, please visit OurCommons.ca

=== Voting record ===
- She voted in support of an opposition motion calling ISIS atrocities "genocide" in 2016.
- In 2016, she voted against the Government in order to support Bill C-230, a Private Member's Bill presented by Conservative MP Larry Miller, which sought to provide a definition of the term "variant" as it applies to firearms classification.
- She voted against the Government to extend debate on Bill C-71 on March 27, 2018. She completed the Firearm Safety Training Course in June 2018 to understand how the proposed changes in legislation would affect gun owners in her riding.
- She voted in favour of Bill C-71 at second reading, supporting the Government position, on March 28, 2018.
- She voted again in favour of Bill C-71 at third reading and adoption of this bill, supporting the Government position, on September 24, 2018.

To view all votes by MP Karen Ludwig, please visit OurCommons.ca

=== Key issues ===
==== Lyme disease ====
Ludwig is an advocate for the awareness, prevention and treatment of Lyme disease, and in May 2016, co-chaired a national roundtable on the disease. She led a series of roundtables across the country following the national one, and supported a pilot project in her riding for increased tick surveillance.

Most recently, Ludwig was joined by representatives from New Brunswick's universities, research institutions, and medicals professions at the Huntsman Marine Science Centre in St. Andrews, New Brunswick to discuss research and awareness on Lyme.

== Motion 150 - Special Committee on the Situation of Endangered Whales ==
On October 31, 2017, Ludwig introduced a Private Members Motion in the House of Commons calling for a special committee to review the situation of endangered whales. The motion was placed on notice that same day, and was eventually withdrawn on November 20, 2017.

=== Text of the motion ===
(a) the Committee be mandated to (i) identify steps that could be taken to better protect and help the recovery of right, beluga, and killer whales, (ii) identify immediate and longer term improvements limiting the impact of human activities on each of these species and, by so doing, add to recovery efforts and to recommendations for new or enhanced actions, (iii) call expert witnesses on each of the species, hearing from those who might be impacted by any possible actions, and working to find a balance among various competing claims;

(b) the membership of the special committee consist of ten (10) members of which six (6) shall be government members, three (3) shall be from the Official Opposition, and one (1) shall be from the New Democratic Party;

(c) all members to serve on the said committee be appointed by their respective Whip by depositing with the Clerk of the House a list of their members to serve on the special committee no later than ten (10) sitting days following the adoption of this motion;

The full motion text can be found on OurCommons.ca

== Motion 154 - Study on the Situation of Canada's Endangered Whales ==
Ludwig introduced a Private Members Motion in the House of Commons on April 23, 2018 calling on government to mandate the Standing Committee of Fisheries and Oceans to undertake a Study on the Situation of Canada’s Endangered Whale species, including the North Atlantic Right Whale, St. Lawrence Estuary Beluga and Southern Resident Killer Whale.

Motion 154 received rare unanimous support in the House of Commons on June 6, 2018. MP Ludwig was quoted in iPolitics saying the unanimous vote "demonstrates that Parliamentarians can stand together."

=== Text of the motion ===
That the Standing Committee on Fisheries and Oceans be instructed to undertake a study on the situation of endangered whales and be mandated to (i) identify steps that could be taken to continue the efforts to protect and help the recovery of North Atlantic Right Whale, St. Lawrence Estuary Beluga, and Southern Resident Killer Whales, (ii) identify immediate and longer term improvements limiting the impact of human activities on each of these species and, by so doing, add to recovery efforts and to recommendations for new or enhanced actions, (iii) call on expert witnesses on each of the species, and those who might be impacted by any possible actions to work to find a balance among various competing claims; and that the Committee present its final report to the House by the end of the 2018 calendar year.

Amendments were introduced to the motion by from its original version during first hour of debate Kevin Lamoureux to allow for flexibility of the committee to conduct the study, and to highlight the importance of finding a balance between maximum protections for the whales while causing minimal impact to industry.

The Motion is dedicated to a constituent, Joseph Howlett, who lost his life while he was disentangling a North Atlantic right whale. Joe participated in nearly 30 whale rescues over the past 15 years.

=== Quotes and endorsements ===
- "It is a truly noble cause to try to save the last of any species." - Mel Arnold, CPC, April 23, 2018, Speech made during first hour of debate on the Motion
- "A study undertaken by the Standing Committee on Fisheries and Oceans will benefit all efforts to conserve our endangered whales by producing an all-party examination of the situation and how it can be improved. CWF will be pleased to be an active participant in this study." - Rick Bates, CEO and Executive Vice President, Canadian Wildlife Federation
- "Our members, through their actions, have been at the forefront of efforts to protect whales by investing in research, looking at ship design and collaboration with other stakeholders. We also support any initiative that leads to better stewardship of efforts to protect these whales." - Serge A. Buy, Chief Executive Officer, Canadian Ferry Association
- "Private Members Bill M-154 includes the need for government to identify immediate and longer term improvements that limit the impact of human activities on these whales, and by so doing, add to recovery efforts and to recommendations for new or enhanced actions." - Misty MacDuffee, Wild Salmon Program Director, Raincoast Conservation Foundation

== International trade and relations ==
Ludwig, who was a member of the Standing Committee on International Trade from 2016 to 2019, was also elected as Vice-Chair of the Canada-USA Inter-parliamentary Group from 2016 to 2019. She traveled to Washington in November 2017 during NAFTA negotiations to meet with U.S. legislators and business organizations. In 2018, Ludwig traveled to Southeast Asia as a member of the Standing Committee on International Trade to open new markets for trade with ASEAN countries.

== Electoral record ==
=== Federal ===
2025 Canadian federal election: Saint John—St. Croix
Party	Candidate	Votes	%	±%
Conservative	John Williamson	26,591	53.08	+6.09
Liberal	Karen Ludwig	20,784	41.49	+13.42
New Democratic	Andrew Hill	1,643	3.28	−9.81
Green	Gerald Irish	794	1.59	−2.46
Libertarian	Keith Tays	280	0.56	+0.51
Total valid votes/expense limit		50,092	99.29	
Total rejected ballots		356	0.71	+0.05
Turnout		50,448	74.66	+9.28
Eligible voters		67,567		
Conservative notional hold		Swing		−3.67
Source: Elections Canada
Note: number of eligible voters does not include voting day registrations.

2019 Canadian federal election: New Brunswick Southwest
Party	Candidate	Votes	%	±%	Expenditures
Conservative	John Williamson	19,451	49.15	+10.59	$88,037.67
Liberal	Karen Ludwig	10,110	25.54	-18.38	$77,377.08
Green	Susan Jonah	5,352	13.52	+8.57	$7,039.17
New Democratic	Doug Mullin	3,251	8.21	-4.36	$0.00
People's	Meryl Sarty	1,214	3.07	-	$5,133.77
Veterans Coalition	Abe Scott	200	0.51	-	$0.00
Total valid votes/expense limit		39,578	100.00		
Total rejected ballots		301	0,75	+0.17	
Turnout		39,879	74,46	+0.21	
Eligible voters		53,556			
Conservative gain from Liberal		Swing		+14.49	
Source: Elections Canada

2015 Canadian federal election: New Brunswick Southwest
Party	Candidate	Votes	%	±%	Expenditures
Liberal	Karen Ludwig	16,656	43.92	+30.36	–
Conservative	John Williamson	14,625	38.56	-18.10	–
New Democratic	Andrew Graham	4,768	12.57	-10.74	–
Green	Gayla MacIntosh	1,877	4.95	-0.15	–
Total valid votes/Expense limit		37,926	100.00		$197,944.39
Total rejected ballots		220	0.58	–	
Turnout		38,146	74.25	–	
Eligible voters		51,376			
Liberal gain from Conservative		Swing		+24.23	
Source: Elections Canada
