= Director of Communications (Office of the Prime Minister) =

One of the most senior roles in the Canadian Prime Minister's Office

The Director of Communications in the Prime Minister's Office (French: Directeur de la Communication au Cabinet du Premier Ministre) is a senior role in the Canadian Prime Minister's Office. The person is responsible for selling the government's agenda to the media and public.

== Duties ==
The portfolio thus encompasses everything from speech writing, communications packages, coordinating announcements, creating media appearances for the Prime Minister, crafting communications responses, liaising with the media, coordinating with ministers' and Members of Parliament's offices, and responding to government controversies.

The position's grueling hours are close only to the Prime Minister's Chief of Staff and Director of Policy.

Since 2006 only half of the directors have lasted more than one year, with the average in the position being just 395 days, or roughly 13 months. The longest serving director is Kate Purchase, who served as Justin Trudeau’s first communications director from October 2015 to December 2019. The shortest duration was just 32 days with William Stairs, who left shortly after Prime Minister Stephen Harper was elected with a minority government.

== Previous Directors of Communications ==
Name	Prime Minister	Dates Served	Reason for Leaving
Peter Donolo	Jean Chrétien	1993–1999	Resigned
Françoise Ducros	Jean Chrétien	1999–2002	Resigned following controversy
Jim Munson	Jean Chrétien	2002–2003	Appointed to the Senate of Canada
Mario Laguë	Paul Martin	2003–2005	Appointed to a diplomatic position
Scott Reid	Paul Martin	2005–2006	Party defeated in 2006 election
William J. Stairs	Stephen Harper	January – February 2006	Unknown
Sandra Buckler	Stephen Harper	February 2006 – June 27, 2008	Cancer treatment
Kory Teneycke	Stephen Harper	July 7, 2008 – July 28, 2009	Job with Sun News Network
John Williamson	Stephen Harper	August 2009 – March 2010	To run for Parliament
Dimitri Soudas	Stephen Harper	March 2010 – September 5, 2011	Hired by the Canadian Olympic Committee
Angelo Persichilli	Stephen Harper	October 2011 – April 2012	Job stress
Andrew MacDougall	Stephen Harper	April 2012 – September 2, 2013	Job in London, England
Jason MacDonald	Stephen Harper	September 12, 2013 – February 13, 2015	Unknown
Rob Nicol	Stephen Harper	February 14, 2015 – October 18, 2015	party defeated in 2015 election
Kate Purchase	Justin Trudeau	October 2015 – December 2019	Job with Microsoft
Cameron Ahmad	Justin Trudeau	January 2020 – June 2023	Unknown
Vanessa Hage-Moussa	Justin Trudeau	June 2023 – March 2025	Resignation of Prime Minister
Jane Deeks	Mark Carney	March 2025 – present	
