= Xiangguo Qiu =

Chinese Canadian virologist

- Education: Tianjin Medical University; Hebei Medical University
- Spouse: Keding Cheng
- Scientific career
- Fields: Virology

Xiangguo Qiu (Chinese: 邱香果) is a Chinese Canadian virologist, former adjunct professor of Medical microbiology at the University of Manitoba and former head of the Vaccine Development and Antiviral Therapies section in the Special Pathogen Program of the Public Health Agency of Canada (PHAC). She is credited as one of the researchers who helped cure Ebola.

== Education and career ==
Qiu earned a PhD in medicine from Tianjin Medical University in 1985 and an MS in Immunology from Hebei Medical University in 1990. Qiu moved to Canada in 1996 for graduate studies and in 2003 started working on antibody treatments at the Canadian National Microbiology Laboratory (NML) in Winnipeg.

While working at the lab, Qiu and Gary Kobinger helped develop ZMapp, an experimental biopharmaceutical drug to treat Ebola. The development of this drug won both Qiu and Kobinger the 2018 Canadian Governor General's Innovation Award.

== National security incident ==
In July 2019, Qiu and her biologist husband Keding Cheng who worked with her at the NML, had their security clearances revoked and were evicted from the facilities by the Royal Canadian Mounted Police (RCMP), leading also to the University of Manitoba severing ties. In a statement to the CBC, a PHAC spokesperson said that the scientists were no longer employed there as of January 2021, declining to disclose additional information or comment further, leaving open speculation about espionage. Four months prior to this incident, Qiu was found to have made a shipment of Ebola and Henipavirus samples from the NML to the Wuhan Institute of Virology, though this was reported to be unconnected to her removal.

On 23 June 2021, The National Post reported that Qiu was listed as co-inventor of two Chinese government patents registered in 2017 and 2019 for innovations related to the Ebola and Marburg viruses, which were the focus of her work at the NML and in contravention of Canadian government policy for public servants. On 16 September 2021, The Globe and Mail reported that cooperation between the NML scientists and the Chinese military went much higher than was previously known and that Qiu had collaborated with Major-General Chen Wei on two papers. Qiu also worked at the Winnipeg Microbiology Lab with Feihu Yan, a member of the People's Liberation Army's Academy of Military Medical Sciences. While Qiu and Cheng have not been charged, they remain under investigation by RCMP.

The Canadian House of Commons Special Committee on Canada-China Relations demanded PHAC to provide answers around the shipment of viruses and why the two scientists were fired. The PHAC director refused, citing privacy legislation. Security officials have said it is a matter of national security. Subsequently, PHAC turned over documents to NSICOP, whose members have national security clearance.

Qiu has not been seen publicly or responded to questions from the media. According to FactCheck.org, viral misinformation has been published in western social media falsely claiming that Qiu was "removed" from the Canadian lab due to having sent pathogens to the Wuhan facility. The BBC explained that much of the misinformation had spread from a tweet that misrepresented the CBC reports and that the words, "coronavirus" and "spy" were not written in any of the CBC reports. In response to the allegations, both RCMP and the health agency have stated repeatedly that there was "no threat to public safety" and Caroline Duval, of the Royal Canadian Mounted Police, clarified to Factcheck.org that "there is no connection between the outbreak in China and any RCMP investigation".

In 2024, the Canadian government released an intelligence report written by Canadian Security Intelligence Service which documented Qiu's activities with the Chinese government to benefit China and that Qiu "repeatedly lied" during the security agency's interviews with her.

== See also ==
- Canada–China relations
- National Microbiology Laboratory
