= Renewable Industries Canada =

The Renewable Industries Canada (RICanada) is a Canadian non-profit organization created in 1984. In 2016, it changed its name from Canadian Renewable Fuels Association (CRFA). The change reinforced the 32 year-old non-profit association's mission to promote the use of value-added products made from renewable resources. RICanada represents the interests of over 30 member companies, and is Canada's leading voice in promoting the role of renewable fuels and value added products in reducing greenhouse gas (GHG) emissions.

Its stated purpose is to "To promote the use of value-added products made from renewable resources through consumer awareness and government liaison activities."

== Leadership ==
RICanada is currently led by an executive director and reports to a board of directors after being previously led by a number of dedicated presidents. Past presidents include Andrea Kent (2014–2017), W. Scott Thurlow (2012–2014), and Gordon Quaiattini (2007–2014). Before 2007, RICanada was led by Kory Teneycke, a former activist with the Reform Party of Canada, and a veteran of the Conservative Party of Canada's war room for the 2006 federal election. At the time, one of the CRFA's registered lobbyists is Ken Boessenkool, a confidant of Conservative Prime Minister Stephen Harper.

== Advocacy ==
In 2017, RICanada launched a public awareness campaign on the environmental and economic benefits of biofuels mandates. Dubbed "Facts Don't Lie", the campaign was designed to educate the public on the role of biofuels in reducing carbon emissions from transportation. The underlying message of the campaign was a call to the federal government to increase mandates for renewable content in fuels. Facts included:

- Ethanol can reduce GHGs by 62 per cent compared to gasoline.
- Biodiesel can reduce GHGs by over 100 per cent compared to diesel.
- Canada's biofuels mandates reduce annual GHG emissions to the same extent as taking one million cars off the road.
- Each year, Canada's biofuels mandate removes as much CO_{2} from the atmosphere as 21 million trees.
- Increasing the federal biofuels mandate could add 31,000 jobs and $5.6 billion to Canada's economy.
- Canada was once a world leader in implementing renewable fuel requirements. Today, over 40 countries require higher levels of biofuel blends in transportation fuels than Canada.

In 2007, the CRFA ran television advertisements promoting a Conservative Party pledge on renewable fuels, and the 5% renewable fuel standard in all transportation fuels in Canada. The advertisements featured images of Stephen Harper, as well as an interview with Conservative candidate Peter Kent. The policy itself has broad political support: the Liberal Party of Canada also supports a 5% renewable fuels standard, and former Saskatchewan NDP Premier Lorne Calvert promoted a 10% biofuels mandate.
