= Gordon Earle =

Canadian politician

Member of Parliament for Halifax West
- In office June 2, 1997 – November 27, 2000
- Preceded by: Geoff Regan
- Succeeded by: Geoff Regan

Personal details
- Born: February 27, 1943 (age 83) Halifax, Nova Scotia, Canada
- Party: New Democratic
- Spouse: Jane Earle

Gordon Sinclair Earle CM (born February 27, 1943) is a Canadian politician. Earle is a member of the New Democratic Party and a former member of the House of Commons of Canada, representing the riding of Halifax West from 1997 to 2000. Earle is the first black Member of Parliament elected from Nova Scotia.

== Career ==
Earle was a senior public servant, he was the first employee of the Nova Scotia Human Rights Commission. He served as Chief Human Rights Officer and assistant to the Ombudsman in Nova Scotia and as Ombudsman of Manitoba.

While in Parliament, Earle was the NDP critic of Multiculturalism, Citizenship and Immigration, Indian Affairs and Northern Development, National Defence, and Veterans Affairs. Earle lost his seat in the 2000 Canadian federal election.

In the 2004 federal election, Earle ran in the riding of South Shore—St. Margaret's, in which a small part of the old Halifax West, in which he resided, had been moved under redistricting. He was defeated by the incumbent, Conservative Gerald Keddy, coming third. He ran again in the 2006 federal election, again losing to Keddy, but improving his vote total and placing second. Earle ran against Keddy for a third time in the 2008 federal election, losing by less than one thousand votes.

Earle again contested the riding in the 2011 federal election losing to Keddy.

== Personal life ==
Earle is a martial artist with a black belt in Karate. He founded the Hammonds Plains Karate Club. In 2026, he was named as a Member of the Order of Canada. He lives in Halifax, Nova Scotia.

== Electoral record ==
2000 Canadian federal election: Halifax West
Party	Candidate	Votes	%	±%
Liberal	Geoff Regan	18,327	39.21	+8.32
New Democratic	Gordon Earle	14,016	29.99	-4.64
Progressive Conservative	Charles Cirtwill	9,701	20.76	-2.70
Alliance	Hilda Stevens	4,531	9.70	-0.77
Marxist–Leninist	Tony Seed	160	0.34	+0.19
Total valid votes		46,735	100.00	
Liberal gain from New Democratic		Swing		+6.48

Changes for the Canadian Alliance from 1997 are based on the results of its predecessor, the Reform Party.

1997 Canadian federal election: Halifax West
Party	Candidate	Votes	%	±%
New Democratic	Gordon Earle	16,013	34.63	+26.23
Liberal	Geoff Regan	14,284	30.89	-14.73
Progressive Conservative	Heather Foley	10,848	23.46	-0.29
Reform	Stephen Oickle	4,843	10.47	-8.93
Natural Law	John Runkle	179	0.39	-0.42
Marxist–Leninist	Gary Zatzman	70	0.15	
Total valid votes		46,237	100.00	
New Democratic gain from Liberal		Swing		+20.48

== See also ==
- Black Nova Scotians
