= Caroline Vu =

Canadian novelist of Vietnamese heritage

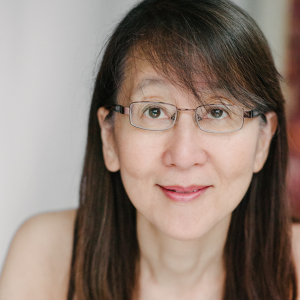
- Born: 1959
- Alma mater: Concordia University
- Occupation: Writer

Caroline Vu is a Canadian novelist of Vietnamese heritage.

== Early life and education ==
Vu was born in 1959 in Dalat, Vietnam (South Vietnam) and grew up in Saigon. At the age of eleven, she immigrated with her mother and brothers to Connecticut. The family later relocated to Montreal, Quebec, Canada.

She has degrees in political science from McGill University, in Psychology from Concordia University, and in medicine from the University of Montreal.

== Career ==
Vu's writings deal with issues of identity and memory, and immigration from Asia (especially Vietnam) to Canada. Her first novel, Palawan Story, was published by the Deux Voiliers Publishing collective in 2014. It won the 2016 Fred Kerner Book Award for the best book by a member of the Canadian Authors Association and was a finalist for the 2014 Concordia University First Book Prize awarded by the Quebec Writers' Federation. Palawan Story was translated and published in French by Les Éditions de la Pleine Lune in August 2017.

The novel takes its name from the island of Palawan in the Philippines, where over half a million Vietnamese refugees were placed in a camp from 1979 to 1993. It tells the story of a young girl named Kim who through a stroke of luck is able to leave the camp at Palawan and build a life for herself first in Connecticut and then in Montreal, struggling as an adult to comprehend the chaotic history of her homeland that she had glimpsed through the eyes of a child.

Vu's second novel, That Summer in Provincetown, was published in 2015 in English by Guernica Editions. In 2016, Les Éditions de la Pleine Lune published the French translation, Un été à Provincetown. It is about three generations of a Vietnamese family who immigrate from Vietnam to Canada. As in Vu's first novel, Provincetown gives human insight into Vietnamese history.

Vu has also published articles in a variety of newspapers, including The Medical Post, the Toronto Star, the Montreal Gazette, The Geneva Times, and The Tico Times.

== Bibliography ==
- Palawan Story (novel) 2014
- That Summer in Provinceton (novel) 2015
- Un été à Provincetown (translated novel) 2016 – French translation of That Summer in Provincetown
- Palawan (translated novel) 2017 – French Translation of Palawan Story
- Television Voices (short story) 2017

== Personal life ==
Vu practices medicine in Montreal, where she lives with her two daughters. She is the widow of Mario Laguë, who was Canadian ambassador to Costa Rica from 2004 to 2007
