= Kory Teneycke =

Canadian communications executive

Director of Communications to the Prime Minister of Canada
- In office 2008–2009
- Prime Minister: Stephen Harper
- Preceded by: Sandra Buckler
- Succeeded by: John Williamson

Personal details
- Born: 1974 (age 51–52) Regina, Saskatchewan, Canada
- Party: Conservative
- Profession: Communications executive

Kory Teneycke (born 1974) is the former vice-president of Sun News Network. He was also the Director of Communications to the Prime Minister's Office under Stephen Harper. He was the campaign manager for the Ontario Progressive Conservative Party during the 2018 Ontario election, 2022 Ontario election, and 2025 Ontario election.

== Personal life ==
Teneycke was born in Regina and raised on a grain farm in rural Saskatchewan near Young. He is personal friends with Jenni Byrne and Ray Novak, all of whom were close advisors to Prime Minister Stephen Harper. The three met while working for the Reform Party of Canada during the 1997 Canadian federal election. Teneycke criticized Byrne's role as campaign manager for the Conservative Party of Canada in the 2025 Canadian federal election.

== Career ==
=== Political activism ===
He worked on the Progressive Conservative campaign in the 1991 Saskatchewan election. He also worked on the losing Progressive Conservative campaign in Swift Current—Maple Creek—Assiniboia in 1993, where he met and became friends with Brad Wall. Teneycke then worked on two Saskatchewan Party campaigns—in 1999 and 2003.

=== Renewable Fuels Association ===
In 2003, he was appointed head of the Canadian Renewable Fuels Association. One of his high priorities as leader was the passage of a law mandating all Canadian gasoline to contain 5 per cent renewable fuel. In early 2008, the Conservative government of Stephen Harper passed Bill C-33, which included just such a mandate to take full effect by 2010.

=== Prime Minister's Office ===
On July 7, 2008, shortly after the passage of C-33, Teneycke was appointed the Director of Communications to Prime Minister Stephen Harper. In addition to his external-facing duties, he was expected to be helpful in bridging relations between factions from the former Progressive Conservative and Reform parties that had been relatively recently united to form the Conservative Party of Canada, because he had previously served roles in both parties: various organizational roles in Reform leader Preston Manning’s office, and a senior policy adviser to Progressive Conservative Premier Mike Harris managing energy and environmental files. On July 28, 2009, he left the position to become the Vice President of Sun News Network.

=== Sun News Network ===
The Hill Times reported on August 31, 2009, that Teneycke had accepted a three-month contract to provide strategic communications advice to Sun TV. After a brief stint as a political commentator for the CBC, in June 2010 Teneycke accepted a position as Vice President for Development at Quebecor Media. On September 15, 2010, Quebecor announced his departure. He rejoined Sun News in 2011, where he remained until Sun News Network shut down on February 13, 2015.

Former Sun News Network senior anchor Krista Erickson wrote an article for National Newswatch in 2015 that singled out Teneycke, who was in charge of the channel, for criticism calling him a "controlling authoritarian" whose pro-Conservative Party "partisanship often went into overdrive" at the channel's expense. Erickson blamed Teneycke for the channel reporting during the 2011 federal election of a 16-year-old incident involving Jack Layton being allegedly found in a massage parlour by police. "There was no arrest, no criminal charge, therefore no criminal behaviour. On these facts, the justification of public interest was arguably thin," according to Erickson who claimed Sun News Network management nevertheless coached its on-air staff to treat the story as if it was "a major sex scandal involving the NDP leader." Erickson also claims that during the 2012 Alberta provincial election campaign, Teneycke "instructed me to stop reporting on the homophobic gaffes of [conservative] Wildrose candidates" and that Teneycke "also demanded a segment discussing the Wildrose leader's record on abortion be removed from my program lineup".

Erickson also claims that, had the CRTC approved the channel's application for a mandatory carriage license, Teneycke planned to fire up to 50 per cent of Sun News Network staff, whom he suspected of being Liberal sympathizers or otherwise politically out of step with Teneycke's views, and replace them with former Conservative Party staffers. Erickson also claims that Sun News contributor Michael Taube stopped being asked to appear on the channel after he expressed disagreement with the Harper government's proposals to allow income splitting.

=== Spokesman for Conservatives during the 2015 election ===
Following the closure of Sun News in early 2015, Teneycke re-joined the Conservative Party's staff in anticipation of the upcoming federal election. He was subsequently active as Chief Spokesman for the Conservative Party for the fall 2015 federal election.

=== Campaign manager for 2018 Ontario election ===
On March 20, 2018, it was announced that Teneycke was assigned to be the campaign manager for the Ontario Progressive Conservative Party during the 2018 Ontario election. After the party won the election, sources says that Teneycke is returning to the private sector. Teneycke runs a lobbying firm, Rubicon.

== Controversy ==
=== "We're better than the news" ===
In June 2015 during an interview with Global TV journalist Tom Clark, Teneycke defended the federal Conservative Party's use of ISIS terrorist videos which could be in violation of the Conservatives' own anti-terrorism legislation. When pressed on the legitimacy of the use of terrorist videos in their advertising, Teneycke replied "...we're better than news, we're truthful...". Tom Clark asked Teneycke to repeat his answer, but he refused.

=== "Group showers" ===
In mid-2010 Teneycke wondered on his Twitter account if Canadian activist Marc Emery, being held in US prison for his Canadian-based marijuana seed distribution business, is "enjoy[ing] group showers as much as he enjoys pot. Three cheers for the DEA." Marc Emery's wife Jodie Emery said the comment "shocked and disgusted" her, adding it's "a common perception that prison rape happens in 'group showers.'" Jodie Emery publicly asked for an apology from Teneycke.

=== Category 1 for SunTV News ===
On July 5, 2010, the Canadian Radio-television and Telecommunications Commission (CRTC) formally denied Quebecor's request to have SunTV News designated as a Category 1 channel (a classification that would require all cable/satellite providers to offer the service) as all requests for this category are on hold until October 2011. At the time, Teneycke said "We’re not particularly fazed by that letter," stating "We’re looking for a cable specialty license. That’s what our initial application is for, and that’s what we’re aiming for." He indicated an amended application would be made to the CRTC. On September 3, 2010, Teneycke on CBC's Power and Politics denied Quebecor even asked the CRTC for this designation, stating "We are not nor have we ever asked for mandatory carriage of this station where Canadians would have to be obliged to pay. We're saying that we would like to have it offered but theoretically it could be carried by no one."

=== Avaaz online petition spam ===
In September 2010, Teneycke responded to criticism of his initiative to start a news channel in Canada which was perceived as getting preferential treatment by the incumbent Conservative government, his former employer. In news interviews, Teneycke pointed out that a petition operated by the group Avaaz opposing the new channel was being infiltrated by illegitimate signatures, going so far as to send an update about it on Twitter.

CBC political blogger Kady O'Malley had questioned the source that Teneycke had cited in his Toronto Sun article as there was no way of knowing who had actually signed up for the Avaaz petition as the signees were not published. Teneycke then admitted that he had a source who had provided false names to prove a point. Later in an interview, Avaaz executive director Ricken Patel indicated that the fake signatures that Teneycke had cited were all added from the same IP address at the time when Teneycke had published the Sun article critical of the petition. Susan Delacourt of the Toronto Star observed "Kory Teneycke seemed to have inside knowledge of the fake names on the petition. Avaaz requested on September 14, 2010, that the Ottawa Police Service and the Royal Canadian Mounted Police begin an investigation to determine the identity of the individual responsible for adding the fraudulent signatures from an Ottawa IP address to the organization's petition dubbed "Stop 'Fox News North'". In his letter to law enforcement on behalf of Avaaz, civil rights lawyer, Clayton Ruby, called for a full criminal investigation on the matter.

No charges were ever filed in relation to Avaaz's complaint.
