= Halifax West—Peggy's Cove =

Federal electoral district in Nova Scotia, Canada

Nova Scotia electoral district
- Interactive map of riding boundaries from the 2025 federal election

Federal electoral district
- Legislature: House of Commons
MP
Lena Diab
Liberal
- District created: 1976
- First contested: 1979
- Last contested: 2025
- District webpage: profile, map

Demographics
- Population (2021): 111,944
- Electors (2025): 75,202
- Area (km²): 227.31
- Pop. density (per km²): 492.5
- Census division: Halifax
- Census subdivision(s): Halifax (part), Wallace Hills

Halifax West—Peggy's Cove (French: Halifax-Ouest—Peggy's Cove; previously Halifax West) is a federal electoral district in Nova Scotia, Canada, that has been represented in the House of Commons of Canada since 1979. Its population in 2021 was 111,944.

== Demographics ==
Historical population
| Year | Pop. | ±% |
|---|---|---|
| 2001 | 79,933 | — |
| 2006 | 88,756 | +11.0% |
| 2011 | 87,275 | −1.7% |
| 2016 | 96,255 | +10.3% |
| 2021 | 111,944 | +16.3% |

According to the 2021 Canadian census, 2023 representation order

Languages: 81.3% English, 3.1% Arabic, 2.9% French, 2.1% Mandarin
Race: 73.7% White, 5.9% South Asian, 4.7% Black, 4.1% Arab, 3.2% Chinese, 3.1% Indigenous, 1.5% Filipino
Religions: 52.9% Christian (24.0% Catholic, 7.8% Anglican, 5.6% United Church, 3.0% Baptist, 1.3% Christian Orthodox, 11.3% other), 5.8% Muslim, 2.7% Hindu, 35.8% none
Median income: $41,600 (2020)
Average income: $55,200 (2020)

== Geography ==
The district includes the communities of Bedford, the west end of Halifax, and an area that extends to the community of Upper Hammonds Plains in the north, Tantallon in the west and Terence Bay in the south. The area is 227.31 km^{2} (87.76 sq mi).

== History ==
The electoral district was created in 1976 from Halifax—East Hants riding. This riding lost territory to South Shore—St. Margarets as a result of the 2012 federal electoral redistribution. Following the 2022 Canadian federal electoral redistribution, the riding gained the Fairmount area from Halifax and the Chebucto Peninsula from South Shore—St. Margarets and lost the Bedford, Hammonds Plains and Lucasville areas to Sackville—Bedford—Preston. These changes came into effect at the calling of the 2025 Canadian federal election.

The riding's name changed to Halifax West—Peggy's Cove (French: Halifax-Ouest—Peggy's Cove) in 2026 as part of Bill C-25 of the 45th Canadian Parliament.

=== Members of Parliament ===
This riding has elected the following members of Parliament:

| Parliament | Years | Member | Party |
|---|---|---|---|
Halifax West; Riding created from Halifax—East Hants
| 31st | 1979–1980 | Howard Edward Crosby | Progressive Conservative |
| 32nd | 1980–1984 | Howard Edward Crosby | Progressive Conservative |
| 33rd | 1984–1988 | Howard Edward Crosby | Progressive Conservative |
| 34th | 1988–1993 | Howard Edward Crosby | Progressive Conservative |
| 35th | 1993–1997 | Geoff Regan | Liberal |
| 36th | 1997–2000 | Gordon Earle | New Democratic |
| 37th | 2000–2004 | Geoff Regan | Liberal |
| 38th | 2004–2006 | Geoff Regan | Liberal |
| 39th | 2006–2008 | Geoff Regan | Liberal |
| 40th | 2008–2011 | Geoff Regan | Liberal |
| 41st | 2011–2015 | Geoff Regan | Liberal |
| 42nd | 2015–2019 | Geoff Regan | Liberal |
| 43rd | 2019–2021 | Geoff Regan | Liberal |
| 44th | 2021–2025 | Lena Diab | Liberal |
| 45th | 2025–2026 | Lena Diab | Liberal |
Halifax West—Peggy's Cove
| 45th | 2026–present | Lena Diab | Liberal |

== Election results ==
=== 2025 ===
2025 Canadian federal election: Halifax West
| Party | Candidate | Votes | % | ±% | Expenditures |
|---|---|---|---|---|---|
| Liberal | Lena Metlege Diab | 36,200 | 65.60 | +18.04 | $60,341.76 |
| Conservative | Rob Batherson | 15,020 | 27.22 | +5.67 | $76,728.19 |
| New Democratic | Rae Tench | 3,083 | 5.59 | -20.41 | $17,705.93 |
| Green | Ron G. Parker | 497 | 0.90 | -1.55 | $3,188.51 |
| People's | Adam LeRue | 384 | 0.70 | -1.61 | $2,080.03 |
| Total valid votes | | 55,184 | 99.23 | –0.30 | $125,733.18 |
| Total rejected ballots | | 426 | 0.77 | +0.30 | |
| Turnout | | 55,610 | 73.42 | +9.12 | |
| Eligible voters (Note: Number of eligible voters does not include election day registrations.) | | 75,745 | | | |
| Liberal notional hold | | Swing | | +6.19 | |
Source: Elections Canada

=== 2021 ===
2021 federal election redistributed results
| Party | Vote | % |
|---|---|---|
| Liberal | 21,758 | 47.55 |
| New Democratic | 11,895 | 26.00 |
| Conservative | 9,858 | 21.55 |
| Green | 1,121 | 2.45 |
| People's | 1,054 | 2.30 |
| Christian Heritage | 62 | 0.14 |
| Communist | 6 | 0.01 |
| Total valid votes | 45,754 | 99.53 |
| Rejected ballots | 214 | 0.47 |
| Registered voters/ estimated turnout | 71,497 | 64.29 |

2021 Canadian federal election: Halifax West
| Party | Candidate | Votes | % | ±% | Expenditures |
|---|---|---|---|---|---|
| Liberal | Lena Metlege Diab | 24,744 | 48.49 | -0.97 | $83,716.15 |
| New Democratic | Jonathan Keith Roberts | 12,331 | 24.16 | +4.97 | $15,101.47 |
| Conservative | Eleanor Humphries | 11,243 | 22.03 | +2.74 | $51,584.17 |
| People's | Julie Scott | 1,447 | 2.84 | – | $4,571.34 |
| Green | Richard Zurawski | 1,181 | 2.31 | -9.75 | $1,237.40 |
| Christian Heritage | Kevin Schulthies | 85 | 0.17 | – | $164.00 |
| Total valid votes/expense limit | | 51,031 | 100.00 | – | $110,211.79 |
| Total rejected ballots | | 191 | | | |
| Turnout | | 51,222 | 64.97 | -5.74 | |
| Registered voters | | 78,839 | | | |
| Liberal hold | | Swing | | -2.99 | |
Source: Elections Canada

=== 2019 ===
2019 Canadian federal election: Halifax West
| Party | Candidate | Votes | % | ±% | Expenditures |
|---|---|---|---|---|---|
| Liberal | Geoff Regan | 26,885 | 49.46 | −19.19 | $47,993.19 |
| Conservative | Fred Shuman | 10,488 | 19.29 | +3.64 | $56,155.00 |
| New Democratic | Jacob Wilson | 10,429 | 19.19 | +7.42 | $3,588.81 |
| Green | Richard Zurawski | 6,555 | 12.06 | +8.12 | $1,525.90 |
| Total valid votes/expense limit | | 54,357 | 99.15 | | $103,859.40 |
| Total rejected ballots | | 465 | 0.85 | +0.49 | |
| Turnout | | 54,822 | 70.71 | −1.00 | |
| Eligible voters | | 77,531 | | | |
| Liberal hold | | Swing | | −11.42 | |
Source: Elections Canada

=== 2015 ===
2015 Canadian federal election: Halifax West
| Party | Candidate | Votes | % | ±% | Expenditures |
|---|---|---|---|---|---|
| Liberal | Geoff Regan | 34,377 | 68.65 | +31.38 | $51,596.91 |
| Conservative | Michael McGinnis | 7,837 | 15.65 | –14.53 | $34,660.89 |
| New Democratic | Joanne Hussey | 5,894 | 11.77 | –16.68 | $38,094.46 |
| Green | Richard Henryk Zurawski | 1,971 | 3.94 | –0.17 | $258.75 |
| Total valid votes/expense limit | | 50,079 | 100.00 | | $203,472.37 |
| Total rejected ballots | | 181 | 0.36 | | |
| Turnout | | 50,260 | 71.71 | | |
| Eligible voters | | 70,089 | | | |
| Liberal hold | | Swing | | +22.95 | |
Source: Elections Canada

2011 federal election redistributed results
| Party | Vote | % |
|---|---|---|
| Liberal | 14,824 | 37.27 |
| Conservative | 12,005 | 30.18 |
| New Democratic | 11,318 | 28.45 |
| Green | 1,632 | 4.10 |

=== 2011 ===
2011 Canadian federal election: Halifax West
| Party | Candidate | Votes | % | ±% | Expenditures |
|---|---|---|---|---|---|
| Liberal | Geoff Regan | 16,230 | 35.92 | -5.64 | $61,795.88 |
| Conservative | Bruce Pretty | 13,782 | 30.50 | +9.37 | $51,236.29 |
| New Democratic | Gregor Ash | 13,239 | 29.30 | -0.30 | $42,761.72 |
| Green | Thomas Trappenberg | 1,931 | 4.27 | -2.81 | $860.31 |
| Total valid votes/expense limit | | 45,182 | 100.0 | | $84,619.08 |
| Total rejected, unmarked and declined ballots | | 239 | 0.53 | +0.16 | |
| Turnout | | 45,421 | 62.34 | +3.21 | |
| Eligible voters | | 72,862 | | | |
| Liberal hold | | Swing | | -7.47 | |

=== 2008 ===
2008 Canadian federal election: Halifax West
| Party | Candidate | Votes | % | ±% | Expenditures |
|---|---|---|---|---|---|
| Liberal | Geoff Regan | 17,129 | 41.56 | -7.80 | $50,515.55 |
| New Democratic | Tamara Lorincz | 12,201 | 29.60 | +5.17 | $25,480.72 |
| Conservative | Rakesh Khosla | 8,708 | 21.13 | -1.91 | $29,390.36 |
| Green | Michael Munday | 2,920 | 7.08 | +3.90 | $2,823.08 |
| Christian Heritage | Trevor Ennis | 257 | 0.62 | – | $123.50 |
| Total valid votes/expense limit | | 41,215 | 100.0 | | $81,056 |
| Total rejected, unmarked and declined ballots | | 154 | 0.37 | +0.04 | |
| Turnout | | 41,369 | 59.13 | -3.92 | |
| Eligible voters | | 69,960 | | | |
| Liberal hold | | Swing | | -6.48 | |

=== 2006 ===
2006 Canadian federal election: Halifax West
| Party | Candidate | Votes | % | ±% | Expenditures |
|---|---|---|---|---|---|
| Liberal | Geoff Regan | 21,818 | 49.36 | +1.86 | $54,533.58 |
| New Democratic | Alan Hill | 10,798 | 24.43 | -3.52 | $15,656.30 |
| Conservative | Rakesh Khosla | 10,184 | 23.04 | +2.10 | $46,536.45 |
| Green | Thomas Trappenberg | 1,406 | 3.18 | -0.43 | $642.68 |
| Total valid votes/expense limit | | 44,206 | 100.0 | | $75,552 |
| Total rejected, unmarked and declined ballots | | 147 | 0.33 | -0.02 | |
| Turnout | | 44,353 | 63.05 | -0.46 | |
| Eligible voters | | 70,349 | | | |
| Liberal hold | | Swing | | +2.69 | |

=== 2004 ===
2004 Canadian federal election: Halifax West
| Party | Candidate | Votes | % | ±% | Expenditures |
|---|---|---|---|---|---|
| Liberal | Geoff Regan | 19,083 | 47.50 | +6.55 | $60,896.27 |
| New Democratic | Bill Carr | 11,228 | 27.95 | -0.12 | $33,350.95 |
| Conservative | Ken MacPhee | 8,413 | 20.94 | -9.26 | $32,442.47 |
| Green | Martin Willison | 1,452 | 3.61 | – | $1,152.00 |
| Total valid votes/expense limit | | 40,176 | 100.0 | | $71,525 |
| Total rejected, unmarked and declined ballots | | 141 | 0.35 | | |
| Turnout | | 40,317 | 63.51 | +3.64 | |
| Eligible voters | | 63,479 | | | |
| Liberal notional hold | | Swing | | +3.34 | |
Changes from 2000 are based on redistributed results. Conservative Party change is based on the combination of Canadian Alliance and Progressive Conservative Party totals.

2000 federal election redistributed results
| Party | Vote | % |
|---|---|---|
| Liberal | 14,289 | 40.95 |
| New Democratic | 9,797 | 28.07 |
| Progressive Conservative | 7,412 | 21.24 |
| Alliance | 3,126 | 8.96 |
| Others | 273 | 0.78 |

=== 2000 ===
2000 Canadian federal election: Halifax West
| Party | Candidate | Votes | % | ±% |
|---|---|---|---|---|
| Liberal | Geoff Regan | 18,327 | 39.21 | +8.32 |
| New Democratic | Gordon Earle | 14,016 | 29.99 | -4.64 |
| Progressive Conservative | Charles Cirtwill | 9,701 | 20.76 | -2.70 |
| Alliance | Hilda Stevens | 4,531 | 9.70 | -0.77 |
| Marxist–Leninist | Tony Seed | 160 | 0.34 | +0.19 |
| Total valid votes | | 46,735 | 100.00 | |
| Liberal gain from New Democratic | | Swing | | +6.48 |

Changes for the Canadian Alliance from 1997 are based on the results of its predecessor, the Reform Party.

=== 1997 ===
1997 Canadian federal election: Halifax West
| Party | Candidate | Votes | % | ±% |
|---|---|---|---|---|
| New Democratic | Gordon Earle | 16,013 | 34.63 | +26.23 |
| Liberal | Geoff Regan | 14,284 | 30.89 | -14.73 |
| Progressive Conservative | Heather Foley | 10,848 | 23.46 | -0.29 |
| Reform | Stephen Oickle | 4,843 | 10.47 | -8.93 |
| Natural Law | John Runkle | 179 | 0.39 | -0.42 |
| Marxist–Leninist | Gary Zatzman | 70 | 0.15 | |
| Total valid votes | | 46,237 | 100.00 | |
| New Democratic gain from Liberal | | Swing | | +20.48 |

=== 1993 ===
1993 Canadian federal election: Halifax West
| Party | Candidate | Votes | % | ±% |
|---|---|---|---|---|
| Liberal | Geoff Regan | 26 904 | 45.62 | +7.01 |
| Progressive Conservative | Joel Matheson | 14 005 | 23.75 | -21.00 |
| Reform | Jim Donohue | 11,439 | 19.40 | |
| New Democratic | Sheila Richardson | 4,952 | 8.40 | -7.85 |
| National | Kirby Judge | 1,201 | 2.04 | |
| Natural Law | Bernard Gormley | 475 | 0.81 | |
| Total valid votes | | 58,976 | 100.00 | |
| Liberal gain from Progressive Conservative | | Swing | | +14.01 |

=== 1988 ===
1988 Canadian federal election: Halifax West
| Party | Candidate | Votes | % | ±% |
|---|---|---|---|---|
| Progressive Conservative | Howard Crosby | 24,815 | 44.75 | -9.53 |
| Liberal | Michael Kelly | 21,409 | 38.61 | +14.36 |
| New Democratic | Lois Wiseman | 9,011 | 16.25 | -4.59 |
| Commonwealth of Canada | Bob Fulcher | 217 | 0.39 | |
| Total valid votes | | 55,452 | 100.00 | |

=== 1984 ===
1984 Canadian federal election: Halifax West
| Party | Candidate | Votes | % | ±% |
|---|---|---|---|---|
| Progressive Conservative | Howard Crosby | 30,287 | 54.28 | +14.31 |
| Liberal | Ben Prossin | 13,529 | 24.25 | -14.32 |
| New Democratic | Dennis Theman | 11,626 | 20.84 | -0.07 |
| Independent | Arthur Canning | 355 | 0.64 | +0.09 |
| Total valid votes | | 55,797 | 100.00 | |

=== 1980 ===
1980 Canadian federal election: Halifax West
| Party | Candidate | Votes | % | ±% |
|---|---|---|---|---|
| Progressive Conservative | Howard Crosby | 19,195 | 39.97 | -7.24 |
| Liberal | Dick Boyce | 18,522 | 38.57 | +3.85 |
| New Democratic | Dennis Theman | 10,043 | 20.91 | +3.73 |
| Independent | Arthur Canning | 266 | 0.55 | -0.02 |
| Total valid votes | | 48,026 | 100.00 | |
lop.parl.ca

=== 1979 ===
1979 Canadian federal election: Halifax West
| Party | Candidate | Votes | % |
|---|---|---|---|
| Progressive Conservative | Howard Crosby | 22,714 | 47.21 |
| Liberal | Dick Boyce | 16,702 | 34.72 |
| New Democratic | Dennis Theman | 8,265 | 17.18 |
| Independent | Arthur Canning | 275 | 0.57 |
| Independent | David Morgan | 152 | 0.32 |
| Total valid votes | | 48,108 | 100.00 |

== See also ==
- List of Canadian electoral districts
- Historical federal electoral districts of Canada
