= IPolitics =

Canadian digital media outlet

iPolitics
- Publisher: Brian Storseth
- Editor: Marco Vigliotti
- Founded: 2010
- Website: ipolitics.ca

iPolitics is a Canadian digital newspaper, which covers stories in Canadian politics. The site was launched in 2010 by James Baxter, and offers daily coverage of political news, a quarterly print magazine, political analysis podcasts, and specialized parliamentary monitoring services. It also runs Queen's Park (QP) Briefing, which focuses on Ontario political news.

It was purchased by Torstar, the parent company of the Toronto Star in 2018, but split off in February 2023 following a division of Torstar assets between two former co-owners; former Torstar co-owner Paul Rivett received both publications.

== History ==
iPolitics was founded in 2010 by James Baxter as a digital newspaper covering Canadian politics. In addition to daily political news coverage, its content also included social media sites, a quarterly magazine, parliamentary monitoring services, and podcasts. In 2018, it was purchased by Torstar, the parent company of the Toronto Star. Torstar moved Queen's Park (QP) Briefing, its daily subscription newsletter for Ontario politics that it launched in 2012, under the iPolitics umbrella. After the sale was completed, Torstar laid off five of iPolitics's staff and appointed Marco Vigliotti as an editor.

After Torstar was taken private in 2020, the two ownership partners fell out, and Paul Rivett asked for a court order to dissolve the partnership assets with Jordan Bitove. In 2021, Torstar announces an equity partnership between iPolitics and Mainstreet Research, a polling company. One-time owner and former Conservative MP Brian Storseth served as its chairman as of 2022.

On February 8, 2023, a deal finalized by arbitrator Douglas Cunningham gave Bitove the Toronto Star and the Metroland Media Group while Rivett received iPolitics and Queen's Park Briefing.

Also on February 8, Jessica Smith Cross, the editor-in-chief of both publications, and reporter Charlie Pinkerton both resigned and said that the outlet's owners had suppressed a story the day before on developers attending a stag and doe party for Ontario Premier Doug Ford's daughter's wedding. Multiple other outlets had reported on how developers, including donors to Ford's Progressive Conservative Party of Ontario, bought protected land in the Greenbelt and would benefit from the premier's plans to take land out of it for development. According to publisher Laura Pennell said that the story did not meet ethical and professional standards and that the editorial staff had been given an opportunity to edit the article. In addition, two reporters who had threatened to quit over the owner's decision on February 7, were laid off on February 8 in pre-planned cost cuts along with a third reporter. Unifor, which was seeking to organize both publications, criticized the layoffs as reducing accountability in Ontario provincial politics. Smith Cross and Pinkerton were later hired by Village Media who launched The Trillium, a site that focuses on Ontario politics.

In May 2024, iPolitics pitched Alex Nuttall, the mayor of Barrie, a collaboration to launch the Barrie Compass as a print community newsletter for the city. Conflict of interest concerns were raised after the outlet published a poll favourable to one of Nuttall's policy proposals in early January, since Nuttall and Storseth were both Conservative MPs, though not concurrently; Storseth's wife had worked as an assistant for Nuttall; and the two are co-founders of health charities with mutual ties. The Barrie integrity commissioner confirmed that there were no conflict of interest concerns. Ultimately, the proposal was rejected and an advertising relationship similar to other papers was the final result.

== Journalists ==
Over the years, journalists and columnists for the site have included Michael Harris, Don Newman, Lawrence Martin, L. Ian MacDonald, Frank Graves, Eliza Reid, and Kady O'Malley. iPoliticsINTEL, originally founded as the Alpheus Group by Danelia Bolivar, was handed off to Marguerite Marlin in 2018.
