= Éric A. Cohen =

- Born: March 19, 1958
- Citizenship: Canadian
- Education: Collège Jean-de-Brébeuf; McGill University; Université de Montréal; Dana–Farber Cancer Institute, Harvard Medical School
- Scientific career
- Fields: HIV Research; Virology; Molecular Biology
- Workplaces: Institut de recherches cliniques de Montréal (IRCM); Université de Montréal; McGill University
- Academic advisors: William A. Haseltine

Éric A. Cohen (born March 19, 1958) is a Canadian molecular virologist whose research is focused on human immunodeficiency virus (HIV)-host interactions that govern viral replication and persistence.

== Education and Training ==
Cohen graduated from Collège Jean-de-Brébeuf of Montréal in 1977 with a college diploma in Health Sciences. He received a B.Sc. in Biochemistry from McGill University in 1981 and a Ph.D. in Molecular Biology from Université de Montréal in 1987.

As a Ph.D. student, he worked on fundamental aspects of herpes simplex virus replication and transformation under the direction of Yves Langelier. In 1986, he joined the laboratory of William A. Haseltine at the Dana–Farber Cancer Institute and Harvard Medical School as a postdoctoral fellow, working on fundamental aspects of HIV structure and function to uncover new targets for antiviral therapy. His postdoctoral work led to the identification of two HIV-1 non-structural proteins, named Viral Protein U (Vpu) and Viral Protein R (Vpr), part of a new class of retroviral proteins – designated accessory proteins – that are required for optimal virus multiplication and dissemination.

== Career and Research ==
In 1990, Cohen became a faculty member of the Department of Microbiology, Infectiology and Immunology at Université de Montréal and was appointed Professor of Virology in 1999. In 2004, he joined the Institut de recherches cliniques de Montréal, where he is currently pursuing research aimed at understanding HIV persistence and identifying intervention strategies for an HIV cure.

Cohen's laboratory has contributed to describing the structure and function of Vpr during HIV-1 infection. His work was also involved in defining Vpr as a viral factor with immune-modulatory functions.

Cohen has investigated the role and function of Vpu in HIV pathogenesis. His laboratory demonstrated that Vpu enables the optimal production and dissemination of the virus and helped shed light on the molecular and cellular mechanisms through which Vpu counteracts BST2 (also designated Tetherin), an interferon-regulated host factor that strongly inhibits the release and transmission of HIV-1 and other enveloped viruses. Cohen's work also showed that Vpu plays a key part in the negative regulation of the CD4 receptor observed during HIV infection and that the antagonistic actions of Vpu on CD4 and BST2 are among the strategies employed by HIV to circumvent several types of anti-HIV immune responses.

== Scientific Activities and Involvements ==
Cohen has received a senior-level Canada Research Chair in Human Retrovirology and most recently the IRCM-Université de Montréal Chair of Excellence in HIV Research. He has authored more than 140 manuscripts and books published in scientific and medical journals, and holds several international patents. He is the team leader of CanCURE, a multidisciplinary research consortium studying HIV-host interactions governing HIV persistence and developing intervention strategies towards an HIV cure. Cohen is a founding member of the AIDS and Infectious Disease Network (SIDA-MI) of the Fonds de recherche du Québec – Santé (FRQS), and currently serves on its scientific committee. He was also a member of the Canadian Institutes of Health Research HIV/AIDS Research Advisory Committee (CHARAC). He was part of the International AIDS Society (IAS) 2016 International Scientific Working Group of more than 50 experts responsible for updating and revising the 2012 Global Scientific Strategy: Towards an HIV Cure.

== Awards ==
In 2012, Cohen received the Marcel-Piché prize awarded to an IRCM researcher. In 2014, he received the Pierre-Bois prize bestowed to an IRCM researcher for his philanthropic and institutional activities as well as his scientific outreach. He was elected as Fellow of the Royal Society of Canada and of the Canadian Academy of Health Sciences in 2016.

== Biotechnology ==
Cohen was the director of the Small Genome Division at Human Genome Sciences, a genomics company that was acquired by GlaxoSmithKline. He was a scientific advisor and collaborator for Theratechnologies, a Canadian biotechnology company that developed Egrifta, the only treatment indicated to reduce excess abdominal fat in HIV-infected patients with lipodystrophy. He was also the co-founder and chairman of the Canadian genomics company Ecopia BioSciences.
