= Kady O'Malley =

Canadian political journalist

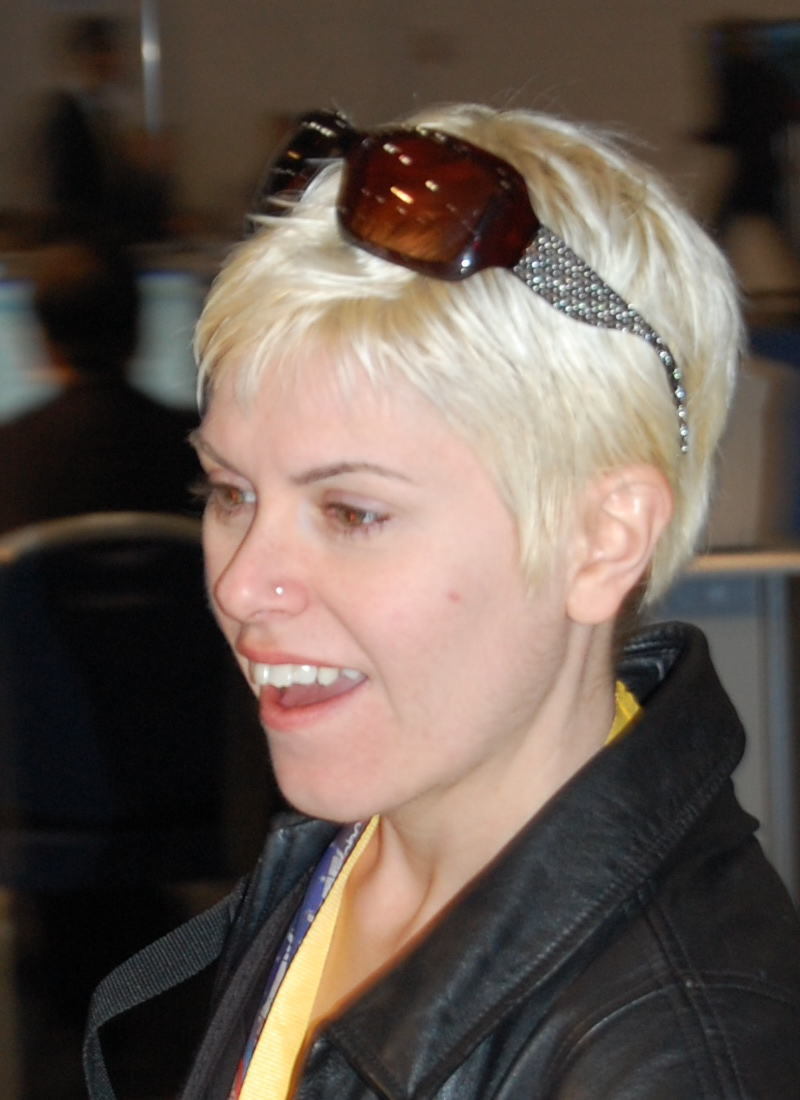
- O'Malley in 2009
- Born: Guelph, Ontario, Canada
- Occupation: Political journalist
- Employers: Maclean's; Canadian Broadcasting Corporation; iPolitics (since 2017)

Kady O'Malley is a Canadian political journalist, currently a writer for the digital political newspaper iPolitics.

Formerly with The Hill Times and then Maclean's magazine, she moved to CBC News as author of the "Inside Politics" blog and became a frequent guest on CBC Radio, CBC News Network and CBC Television commenting on parliamentary affairs. In June 2015, she left CBC and began working at the Ottawa Citizen as a Parliament Hill and politics reporter with her work appearing primarily via the newspaper's smartphone application. Upon hiring her, the Citizen touted her as "Canada’s first mobile-focused political journalist".

O'Malley was born in Guelph, Ontario but grew up in Ottawa where her father, Peter O'Malley, worked as communications director for New Democratic Party leader Ed Broadbent and her mother worked as a government economist.
