= Jason MacDonald (politician) =

Director of Communications to the Prime Minister of Canada
- In office 2013–2015
- Prime Minister: Stephen Harper
- Preceded by: Andrew MacDougall
- Succeeded by: Rob Nicol

Personal details
- Born: 1971 (age 54–55) Montreal, Quebec
- Party: Conservative Party of Canada
- Spouse: Lara Mills
- Children: Molly and Ella
- Profession: Public relations

Jason MacDonald is a Canadian communications professional and was the candidate for the Ontario PC Party in the 2011 Ontario election in the riding of Ottawa South. In 2013, MacDonald was appointed as Prime Minister Stephen Harper's eighth Director of Communications.

== Early life ==
=== Education ===
MacDonald holds an M.A. from Wilfrid Laurier University and a B.A. from Bishop's University.

== Personal life ==
MacDonald has twin daughters, Molly and Ella, with his wife Lara.

== Communications career ==
MacDonald was the Chief of Staff at CBC Television in Toronto, followed later by his role as the Director of Public Relations and Operations at CBC Corporate Communications in Ottawa.

MacDonald then moved into his role as Vice President of Corporate and Public Affairs with Veritas Corporation, a full-service communications agency in Toronto.

In 2009, MacDonald moved back to Ottawa and was hired as Carleton University's Director of Communications. He would take a leave of absence from this role so he could run in the 2011 election, and returned for a short period of time.

MacDonald served as the Department of Aboriginal Affairs Minister's Director of Communications for almost two years, serving under John Duncan then Bernard Valcourt.

Rumours began on September 10, 2013 when Ottawa journalist Don Martin wrote that "sources" said MacDonald was about to be named Harper's Communications Director. MacDonald's initial response seemed like he was denying the rumour, succinctly replying "I’m happy working for Minister Valcourt. Thanks. Jason." Two days later MacDonald was named as the Prime Minister's Office's Director of Communications.

In 2015, Macdonald joined Hill+Knowlton, a global public affairs and government relations firm in Ottawa. He currently serves as Vice-President of Corporate Communications.

== 2011 Ontario PC Party Candidate ==
MacDonald was elected as the Ontario PC candidate for the riding of Ottawa South, and was faced with the tough challenge of facing off against then-sitting Premier Dalton McGuinty.

Since PC Party leader Tim Hudak was unilingual English, MacDonald was given the responsibility of speaking for the Ontario PC Party during the French leaders' debate.

McGuinty would win by 7,000 votes, but the Ontario Liberals would also lose their majority government.

== Appointment as Harper's Director of Communications ==
Rumours began on September 10, 2013 when Ottawa journalist Don Martin tweeted that "sources" said MacDonald was about to be named Harper's Communications Director. MacDonald's initial response seemed like he was denying the rumour, succinctly replying "I’m happy working for Minister Valcourt. Thanks. Jason." Two days later MacDonald was named as the Prime Minister's Office's Director of Communications, replacing Andrew MacDougall, who left for a job in England.

Former Paul Martin speechwriter Scott Reid described MacDonald as "a great guy," "genuinely decent," and "well-motivated."

== Libel case ==
In January 2014, MacDonald accused the National Council of Canadian Muslims of having "documented ties to a terrorist organization such as Hamas". The council, a Canadian Muslim civil liberties organization, filed a libel notice the same month in response, demanding a retraction and apology. Subsequently, on May 26, 2014, the council filed a defamation lawsuit in Ontario Superior Court against MacDonald and Prime Minister Harper as it had not received a retraction. In February 2015, MacDonald was questioned under oath in the defamation case and Harper claimed parliamentary privilege to avoid testifying. That same month, MacDonald resigned as the Prime Minister's communications director. In March 2017, as part of a settlement between council and MacDonald, he admitted that his statements were inaccurate. The Government of Canada also issued a statement "disavowing MacDonald's suggestion that the council had terrorist ties."
