= Sandra Buckler =

Former director of communications office of the prime minister

Director of Communications to the Prime Minister of Canada
- In office 2006–2008
- Prime Minister: Stephen Harper
- Preceded by: William J. Stairs
- Succeeded by: Kory Teneycke

Personal details
- Party: Conservative Party of Canada

Sandra Buckler is a former director of communications for the Office of the Prime Minister of Canada under Conservative Party of Canada Prime Minister Stephen Harper. She was appointed in 2006 and resigned from her position on June 26, 2008. Her tenure was contentious, including charges from the national media that she was overly restricted in sharing information, pressing journalists to instead focus on photo ops and adhering rigorously to talking points from the Office of the Prime Minister (PMO), as well as accusations from Members of Parliament that she had bullied them, and charges of conflict of interest. She joined Canadian Tire as Vice President of communications in 2015.

In 2006, while Buckler was a spokesperson in Prime Minister Harper's Government, critics charged that the Conservative government's use of friendly lobbyists as strategists during the recent election and as spokespersons on television news programs constituted the kind of "revolving door" activity that the Conservative government's Federal Accountability Act purported to put to an end by imposing a five-year ban on lobbying activity on the part of former ministers, their aides, and senior public servants. Buckler argued that the Act "meets every test any reasonable Canadian would propose for ensuring ethical conduct between lobbyists and government."

As a lobbyist, Buckler's client list has included the Aeroguard Company Ltd. (later purchased by rival GardaWorld Corporation), a private security firm) that was awarded a multi-million dollar contract with the federal government to provide pre-board passenger screening at major airports in western Canada. It has also included BC Rail, Biotech, Bombardier, the Canada-Israel Committee, Coca-Cola, the College of Chiropractors of Ontario, De Beers, Skills Canada, and WorkSafeBC. A vote was taken on Monday, February 5, 2007, Bloc Quebecois MP Jean-Yves Laforest tried to pass a motion to call on Buckler to appear before the Standing Committee on Public Accounts in order to clarify the issue of her acting as a lobbyist for real estate firm Royal LePage's Relocation Services division after it won a government contract to manage the relocation of 15,000 military personnel, RCMP, and other government employees. The motion was negated by a vote of 9 to 2.

After 28 months as Harper's director of communications, she kept a low profile from June 2008 until the Ontario Tory leadership campaign in 2009 when she appeared as director of communications for Frank Klees.

The Globe also mentioned but did not confirm the rumour that Buckler would be taking on a new government job as Chief of Staff to Public Safety Minister Peter Van Loan, with whom she shares Ontario PC roots, relieving Liam O'Brien, Van Loan's acting chief of staff and policy director.

In Brian Cohen's undated satire, Sandra Buckler, the chief of staff for Intergovernmental Affairs Minister Peter Penashue, is depicted as a character out of George Orwell's classic 1984.

According to her firm's corporate website, Sandra Buckler served as Chief of Staff to Ministers of Health, Northern Development, International Trade, Public Safety, and Intergovernmental Affairs. In November 2013 Sandra Buckler became Vice-President of the Ottawa group, Bluesky Strategy.

Buckler worked on the 2011 election campaign for Jim Flaherty's replacement, and spoke favourably about Joe Oliver.
