= James Wilson (scientist) =

Medical researcher

James M. Wilson
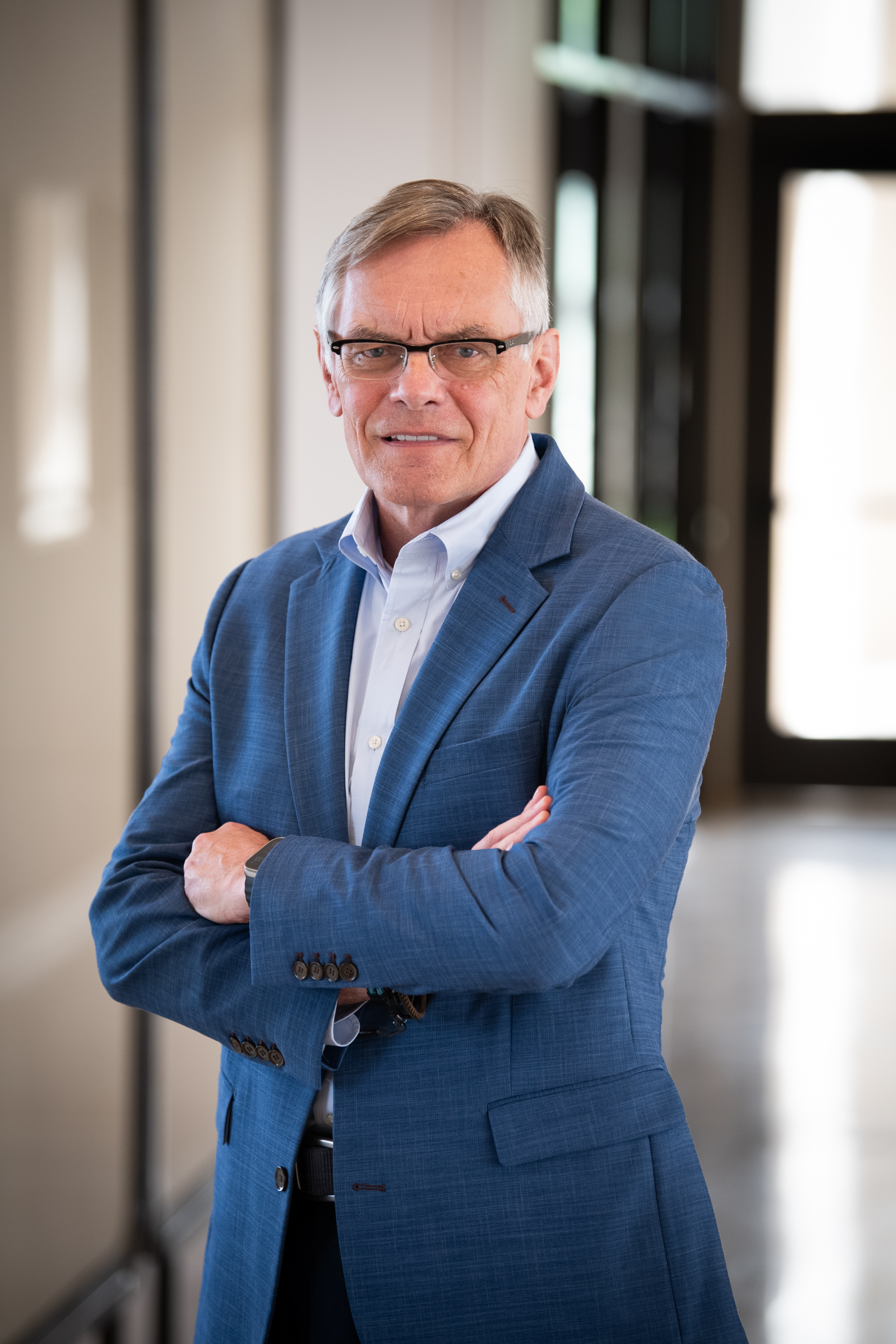
- Born: May 29, 1955 (age 71)
- Education: Albion College, University of Michigan
- Known for: Gene Therapy
- Children: 4
- Scientific career
- Workplaces: Perelman School of Medicine
- Doctoral advisor: William N. Kelley

James M. Wilson (born May 29, 1955) is an American biomedical researcher and CEO of two biotech companies, Gemma Biotherapeutics and Franklin Biolabs, focused on gene therapies. He previously served as the Director of the Gene Therapy Program, Rose H. Weiss Professor and Director of the Orphan Disease Center, and Professor of Medicine and Pediatrics at the Perelman School of Medicine at the University of Pennsylvania. Previously, he held the John Herr Musser endowed professorship at the Perelman School of Medicine.

== Education ==
Wilson graduated from Albion College (B.A., Chemistry) and the University of Michigan (MD, PhD). He completed residency training in Internal Medicine at the Massachusetts General Hospital followed by a postdoctoral fellowship at the Whitehead Institute.

== Career ==
Wilson's research involves the development of viral-based gene therapies for genetic diseases. A major research focus is the generation of novel vectors for improved transduction efficiencies and regulated expression, as well as the elucidation of host immune responses to viral vectors. His work emphasizes the creation of vectors for in vivo gene therapy concentrating on adeno-associated viruses. This work began with the discovery in his laboratory of a new family of primate AAVs; over 120 new AAV capsids were rescued as latent genomes from primate tissues and studied for their biology and potential as vectors. This has led to an enhanced understanding of vector host interactions and a new generation of vectors with substantially improved performance profiles beyond that provided from the original 6 AAV isolates. More recently, Wilson's laboratory has used AAV to accomplish successful in vivo genome editing. As of 2018, his laboratory's translational research portfolio included more than 30 orphan disease programs.

The adeno-associated viruses serotypes discovered in Wilson's lab were used in several clinically approved gene therapies including onasemnogene abeparvovec which uses AAV9. Wilson is the founder of several gene therapy companies including Genovo, Regenxbio, Passage Bio, and Scout Bio.

On August 1, 2024, Jim Wilson announced he would be departing the University of Pennsylvania Gene Therapy Program and starting two new companies Gemma Biotherapeutics and Franklin Biolabs. Gemma Biotherapeutics will aim to build advanced medicines for patients with rare diseases. Franklin Biolabs will serve as a contract research organization for companies working on genetic medicines.

=== Jesse Gelsinger ===
In 1999, Wilson led a clinical trial at the Institute for Human Gene Therapy using an adenoviral vector that resulted in the death of Jesse Gelsinger. As a result, the government banned him from working on FDA-regulated human clinical trials for five years and shut down the institute, which led to a shift in his research focus towards a study of adeno-associated viruses (AAV).
