= William J. Stairs =

Canadian politician

Director of Communications to the Prime Minister of Canada
- In office January–February 2006
- Prime Minister: Stephen Harper
- Succeeded by: Sandra Buckler

Personal details
- Born: September 30, 1956 (age 69) Halifax, Nova Scotia, Canada
- Party: Conservative Party of Canada

William James Stairs (born September 30, 1956) is a Canadian politician. Stairs attended King's-Edgehill School in Windsor, Nova Scotia and went on to complete his PhD from Université Laval. He was the director of communications for Canadian Prime Minister, Stephen Harper.

Born in Halifax, Nova Scotia, Stairs has a doctorate in Canadian political history, and is fluently bilingual.

A former special assistant to The Honourable Senator Lowell Murray, William Stairs was the Progressive Conservative Party of Canada candidate in the 2000 federal election in the Timiskaming—Cochrane riding, finishing third to the Liberal candidate Benoit Serré. In 2003, Stairs became a spokesman for Progressive Conservative Party of Canada leader, Peter MacKay. In 2005, he was made a Conservative Party of Canada spokesman and communications director for party leader Stephen Harper during the 2006 Canadian federal election.
