= ArriveCAN =

App released by the Canada Border Services Agency

- Developers: Canada Border Services Agency; GC Strategies
- Release: April 29, 2020; 6 years ago
- Stable release: 3.6.11 / August 27, 2025
- Operating system: Android, iOS, web browsers
- Available in: English, French, Spanish
- Type: Customs declaration
- Website: www.canada.ca/en/border-services-agency/services/arrivecan.html

ArriveCAN is a mobile app provided by the Canada Border Services Agency (CBSA). Introduced in April 2020, it allows travellers entering Canada to electronically submit travel documents and customs declarations.

The app was initially developed as a joint effort between the CBSA and the Public Health Agency of Canada, as part of the federal government's response to the COVID-19 pandemic. It was used to submit travel documents, health assessments, and declarations of plans for mandatory self-isolation. In July 2021, the app began to be used for submitting proof of COVID-19 vaccination. Use of the app was compulsory between November 2020 and October 2022 while COVID-19 travel restrictions were in effect.

ArriveCAN has faced scrutiny over its costs and who was subcontracted to undertake its development, with the issue becoming the subject of a political scandal in 2024.

== History ==
ArriveCAN was introduced by the federal government on April 20, 2020, as part of its response to the COVID-19 pandemic, and launched on April 29, 2020. The app was developed by a two-person Canadian consulting firm, GC Strategies, through a pre-existing contract with the CBSA. It would be used to submit health screenings, contact information, and declaration of plans for mandatory self-isolation per the Quarantine Act. In November 2020, use of the app or the CBSA website became mandatory.

The purpose of the ArriveCAN app evolved with changes to federal public health orders. In July 2021, the app was repurposed for enforcing a COVID-19 vaccine mandate; all travellers were required to submit proof of vaccination for COVID-19 via ArriveCAN, or be required to self-isolate on arrival. This proof of vaccination functionality was built on the SMART Health Card framework, enabling the app to store, recognize and verify credentials from every province, territory and foreign country. In July 2022 a glitch in the app on iOS erroneously instructed more than 10,000 travelers to quarantine, despite having submitted proof of vaccination.

The federal government announced that the app would continue to be offered after the conclusion of COVID-19 travel requirements, with plans to add functionality for advance customs declarations. In October 2022, all remaining COVID-19-related travel orders were discontinued.

== Controversies ==
There has been much scrutiny over how much the ArriveCAN app cost to develop and who was subcontracted for its development. Contracts show that the federal government will spend close to $54 million with 23 separate subcontractors. A Parliamentary committee ordered federal departments to submit contracting documents related to the app but have been told that the names of subcontractors cannot be released citing issues of confidentiality. In October 2022, two developers at two separate IT companies took part in a hackathon where they both developed duplicates of the ArriveCAN app in under two days, for an estimated cost of $250,000.

On November 2, 2022, a motion was passed calling on the Auditor General of Canada to "conduct a performance audit, including the payments, contracts and sub-contracts for all aspects of the ArriveCAN app, and to prioritize this investigation." This was the second such motion to pass.

In January 2024, the Procurement Ombudsman Alexander Jeglic released a practice review report on ArriveCAN, finding the government's procurement procedure applied criteria that "were overly restrictive and favored" GC Strategies. The contracts were repeatedly won by outsourcing companies listing subcontractors who ultimately did no work. The Chief Technology Officer of the CBSA, Minh Doan, was accused of "manipulating, destroying files at CBSA", a claim he denied.

On February 12, 2024, the Auditor General of Canada released the report, finding that those involved in the contracting, development and implementation of the app showed a "glaring disregard for basic management and contracting practices" and Canadians "paid too much" for ArriveCAN. The report estimated the project to cost around $59.5 million dollars, but it was impossible to know the final cost due to bad management.

On February 21, 2024, the Canadian House of Commons Standing Committee on Government Operations and Estimates passed a motion to summon the two heads of GC Strategies, Kristian Firth and Darren Anthony.

On March 1, 2024, it was revealed that David Yeo, a defence department employee and president of Dalian Enterprise, was involved in the ArriveCAN scandal. CBC News reported that his company had received over $200 million in government contracts since 2015, including $7.9 million for the ArriveCAN app. Following this disclosure, the government suspended all contracts with Dalian Enterprise and initiated an internal investigation to address the potential conflict of interest.

=== Reactions ===
Conservative Party leader Pierre Poilievre requested that the RCMP expand the investigation, stating that the situation "reeks of corruption at the highest levels". Former NDP leader Tom Mulcair said it "could be worse than the sponsorship scandal".

== See also ==
- List of political scandals in Canada
- Vaccine passports during the COVID-19 pandemic
