= Howard Edward Crosby =

Canadian politician

Howard Edward Crosby (26 November 1933 – 12 December 2003) was a Canadian politician and lawyer. Crosby served as a Progressive Conservative party member of the House of Commons of Canada. He was born in Halifax, Nova Scotia and became a lawyer and barrister by career.

He represented the Nova Scotia riding of Halifax—East Hants, subsequently Halifax West since a by-election win there on 16 October 1978. He was re-elected in the 1979, 1980, 1984 and 1988 federal elections.

He served in the latter part of the 30th Canadian Parliament and for four successive full terms from the 31st through 34th Canadian Parliaments. He left national politics in 1993 and did not campaign in that year's federal election.

== Electoral record ==
1984 Canadian federal election: Halifax West
Party	Candidate	Votes	%	±%
Progressive Conservative	Howard Crosby	30,287	54.28	+14.31
Liberal	Ben Prossin	13,529	24.25	-14.32
New Democratic	Dennis Theman	11,626	20.84	-0.07
Independent	Arthur Canning	355	0.64	+0.09
Total valid votes		55,797	100.00	

1980 Canadian federal election: Halifax West
Party	Candidate	Votes	%	±%
Progressive Conservative	Howard Crosby	19,195	39.97	-7.24
Liberal	Dick Boyce	18,522	38.57	+3.85
New Democratic	Dennis Theman	10,043	20.91	+3.73
Independent	Arthur Canning	266	0.55	-0.02
Total valid votes		48,026	100.00	
lop.parl.ca

1979 Canadian federal election: Halifax West
Party	Candidate	Votes	%
Progressive Conservative	Howard Crosby	22,714	47.21
Liberal	Dick Boyce	16,702	34.72
New Democratic	Dennis Theman	8,265	17.18
Independent	Arthur Canning	275	0.57
Independent	David Morgan	152	0.32
Total valid votes		48,108	100.00
