= Canadian House of Commons Liaison Committee =

Permanent committee of the House of Commons of Canada

The House of Commons Liaison Committee (LIAI) is a non-standing, permanent committee of the House of Commons of Canada, established under standing order 107(1) consisting of a minimum of seven members and composed of the Chairs of all the standing committees and the Chairs of House of Commons standing joint committees, who may also be members of subcommittees. It is responsible for managing funds from the budget subcommittee to standing committees from the Board of Internal Economy and meets in camera to discuss administrative and financial issues relating to standing committees. associate members of the Liaison committee consist of the Vice-Chairs of standing committees and the House Vice-Chairs of standing joint committees.

== Membership in the 42nd Canadian Parliament ==
Party	Member	Riding
Conservative, Vice-Chair	Tom Lukiwski	Moose Jaw—Lake Centre—Lanigan, SK
Conservative	Harold Albrecht	Kitchener—Conestoga, ON
Conservative	Bob Zimmer	Prince George — Peace River — Northern Rockies, BC
Conservative	Karen Vecchio	Elgin-Middlesex-London, ON
Conservative	Kevin Sorenson	Battle River—Crowfoot, AB
Liberal	Judy Sgro, Chair	Humber River—Black Creek, ON
Liberal	Larry Bagnell	Yukon, YT
Liberal	Bill Casey	Cumberland—Colchester, NS
Liberal	Wayne Easter	Malpeque, PEI
Liberal	Neil Ellis	Bay of Quinte, ON
Liberal	Mark Eyking	Sydney—Victoria, NS
Liberal	Maryann Mihychuk	Kildonan-St. Paul, MB
Liberal	Pat Finnigan	Miramichi—Grand Lake, NB
Liberal	Julie Dabrusin	Toronto-Danforth, ON
Liberal	Stephen Fuhr	Kelowna—Lake Country, BC
Liberal	Anthony Housefather	Mount Royal, QC
Liberal	James Maloney	Etobicoke—Lakeshore, ON
Liberal	Bryan May	Cambridge, ON
Liberal	Bob Nault	Kenora, ON
Liberal	Rob Oliphant	Don Valley West, ON
Liberal	Denis Paradis	Brome—Missisquoi, QC
Liberal	Dan Ruimy	Pitt Meadows—Maple Ridge, BC
Liberal	Deb Schulte	King—Vaughan, ON
Liberal	Bernadette Jordan	South Shore - St. Margarets, NS
Liberal	Gagan Sikand	Mississauga-Streetsville, ON
Liberal	Borys Wrzesnewskyj	Etobicoke Centre, ON

== Subcommittees ==
- Subcommittee on Committee Budgets (SBLI)
