= List of New Brunswick senators =

This is a list of past and present members of the Senate of Canada representing the province of New Brunswick.

During the Quebec Conference of 1864, New Brunswick was guaranteed 10 Senate seats, but because Prince Edward Island stalled for equal representation in the upper house, New Brunswick was awarded two of Prince Edward Island's Senate seats until 1873 when Prince Edward Island gave in and joined confederation New Brunswick dropped to 10 seats. New Brunswick kept 12 seats until the first two senators ended their term after 1873, they were not replaced.

== Current senators ==
Name	Party	Division^{1}	Date appointed	Appointed by^{2}	Mandatory retirement
Dawn Arnold	Independent Senators Group	New Brunswick	March 7, 2025	Trudeau, J.	April 23, 2041
Jim Quinn	Conservative	New Brunswick	June 21, 2021	Trudeau, J.	January 25, 2032
René Cormier	Independent Senators Group	New Brunswick	November 10, 2016	Trudeau, J.	April 27, 2031
John McNair	Independent Senators Group	New Brunswick	October 31, 2023	Trudeau, J.	June 3, 2032
Victor Boudreau	Independent Senators Group	New Brunswick	June 28, 2024	Trudeau, J.	May 3, 2045
Rodney Ouellette	Non-affiliated	New Brunswick	July 9, 2026	Carney	October 2, 2039
Rose-May Poirier	Conservative	Saint-Louis-de-Kent	February 28, 2010	Harper	March 2, 2029
Pierrette Ringuette	Independent Senators Group	New Brunswick	December 12, 2002	Chrétien	December 31, 2030
Krista Ann Ross	Canadian Senators Group	New Brunswick	October 31, 2023	Trudeau, J.	September 30, 2042
Joan Kingston	Independent Senators Group	New Brunswick	October 31, 2023	Trudeau, J.	January 8, 2030

Notes:

^{1} Senators are appointed to represent New Brunswick. Each senator may choose to designate a geographic area within the province as their division.
^{2} Senators are appointed by the governor general on the recommendation of the prime minister.

== Historical ==
Name	Party	Division^{1}	Date appointed	Appointed by^{2}	End of term
Michael Adams	Conservative	Northumberland	January 7, 1896	Bowell	January 1, 1899
Margaret Jean Anderson	Liberal	Northumberland-Miramichi	March 23, 1978	Trudeau, P. E.	August 7, 1990
George Thomas Baird	Conservative	Victoria	June 19, 1895	Bowell	April 21, 1917
Frank Black	Conservative	Westmorland	November 25, 1921	Meighen	February 28, 1945
Amos Botsford	Conservative	New Brunswick	October 23, 1867	Royal Proclamation	March 22, 1894
Thomas-Jean Bourque	Conservative	Richibucto	January 20, 1917	Borden	February 16, 1952
John Boyd	Liberal-Conservative	Saint John	February 11, 1880	MacDonald	September 21, 1893
Alfred Johnson Brooks	Progressive Conservative	Royal	September 12, 1960	Diefenbaker	November 7, 1967
John Bryden	Liberal	New Brunswick	November 23, 1994	Chrétien	October 31, 2009
George Burchill	Liberal	Northumberland-Miramichi	April 19, 1945	King	August 19, 1977
Kennedy Burns	Liberal	New Brunswick	March 21, 1893	Thompson	June 23, 1895
Charles Burpee	Liberal	New Brunswick	February 1, 1900	Laurier	July 19, 1900
Erminie Cohen	Progressive Conservative	Saint John	June 4, 1993	Mulroney	July 23, 2001
Arthur Copp	Liberal	Westmorland	September 25, 1925	King	December 5, 1949
Eymard Corbin	Liberal	Grand-Sault	July 9, 1984	Turner	August 2, 2009
John Costigan	Liberal	Victoria	January 15, 1907	Laurier	September 29, 1916
Joseph Day	Liberal	Saint John-Kennebecasis	October 4, 2001	Chrétien	January 24, 2020
John Waterhouse Daniel	Conservative	Saint John City	March 18, 1912	Bordon	January 11, 1933
James Dever	Liberal	Saint John	March 14, 1868	MacDonald	May 7, 1904
Mabel DeWare	Progressive Conservative	Moncton	September 23, 1990	Mulroney	August 9, 2001
James Domville	Liberal	Rothesay	April 20, 1903	Laurier	July 30, 1921
J.J. Hayes Doone	Liberal	Charlotte	June 25, 1949	St. Laurent	April 6, 1953
John Ellis	Liberal	Saint John	September 3, 1900	Laurier	June 10, 1913
Clarence Emerson	Progressive Conservative	Saint John-Albert	October 12, 1957	Diefenbaker	September 25, 1963
Henry Emmerson	Liberal	Dorchester	June 25, 1949	St. Laurent	June 21, 1954
John Ferguson	Conservative	Bathurst	October 23, 1867	Royal Proclamation	August 21, 1888
Muriel McQueen Fergusson	Liberal	Fredericton	May 19, 1953	St. Laurent	May 23, 1975
Walter Edward Foster	Liberal	Saint John	December 6, 1928	King	November 14, 1947
Edgar Fournier	Progressive Conservative	Madawaska-Restigouche	September 24, 1962	Diefenbaker	February 11, 1983
J. Michel Fournier	Liberal	Restigouche-Gloucester	December 9, 1971	Trudeau, P. E.	September 29, 1980
George Fowler	Conservative	Kings and Albert	June 29, 1917	Borden	September 2, 1924
Arthur Gillmor	Liberal	New Brunswick	April 2, 1900	Laurier	April 13, 1903
Daniel Gillmor	Liberal	St. George	January 15, 1907	Laurier	February 22, 1918
John Glasier	Liberal	Sunbury	March 14, 1868	MacDonald	July 7, 1894
Richard Hatfield	Progressive Conservative	New Brunswick	September 7, 1990	Mulroney	April 26, 1991
Robert Leonard Hazen	Conservative	New Brunswick	October 23, 1867	Royal Proclamation	August 15, 1874
George Burpee Jones	Conservative	New Brunswick	July 20, 1935	Bennett	April 27, 1950
Judith Keating	Independent Senators Group	New Brunswick	January 30, 2020	Trudeau, J.	July 16, 2021
George King	Liberal	Queen's	December 18, 1896	Laurier	April 28, 1928
Noël Kinsella	Conservative	Fredericton-York-Sunbury	September 12, 1990	Mulroney	November 28, 2014
Joseph Landry	Liberal	Village of Cap-Pelé	February 26, 1996	Chrétien	June 19, 1997
Roméo LeBlanc	Liberal	Beauséjour	June 29, 1984	Trudeau, P. E.	November 21, 1994
Antoine Joseph Léger	Conservative	L'Acadie	August 14, 1935	Bennett	April 7, 1950
Aurel Léger	Liberal	Kent	June 12, 1953	St. Laurent	December 28, 1961
Viola Léger	Liberal	L'Acadie	June 13, 2001	Chrétien	June 29, 2005
James Lewin	Liberal	Saint John (Lancaster)	November 10, 1876	Mackenzie	March 11, 1900
Rose-Marie Losier-Cool	Liberal	Tracadie	March 21, 1995	Chrétien	June 18, 2012
Abner Reid McClelan	Liberal	New Brunswick	October 23, 1867	Royal Proclamation	December 9, 1896
John Anthony McDonald	Independent	Shediac	February 17, 1921	Meighen	December 12, 1948
Charles McElman	Liberal	Nashwaak Valley	February 24, 1966	Pearson	April 1, 1990
Frederic McGrand	Liberal	Sunbury	July 28, 1955	St. Laurent	January 22, 1988
Paul McIntyre	Conservative	New Brunswick	September 6, 2012	Harper	November 2, 2019
Alexander Neil McLean	Liberal	Southern New Brunswick	April 18, 1945	King	March 12, 1967
Donald A. McLean	Liberal	Charlotte County	March 15, 1968	Pearson	November 5, 1973
Peter McSweeney	Liberal	Northumberland	March 15, 1899	Laurier	February 2, 1921
Hervé Michaud	Liberal	Kent	March 15, 1968	Pearson	June 5, 1978
Peter Mitchell	Liberal	New Brunswick	October 23, 1867	Royal Proclamation	July 13, 1872
Percy Mockler	Conservative	New Brunswick	January 2, 2009	Harper	April 14, 2024
William Muirhead	Liberal	Chatham	January 4, 1873	MacDonald	December 29, 1884
William Hunter Odell	Conservative	Rockwood	October 23, 1867	Royal Proclamation	July 25, 1891
Frederick William Pirie	Liberal	Victoria-Carleton	April 19, 1945	King	October 3, 1956
Pascal Poirier	Liberal-Conservative	L'Acadie	March 9, 1885	MacDonald	September 25, 1933
Nelson Rattenbury	Liberal	Saint John	February 14, 1964	Pearson	May 27, 1973
Daniel Riley	Liberal	Saint John	December 21, 1973	Trudeau, P. E.	September 13, 1984
Brenda Robertson	Progressive Conservative	Riverview	December 21, 1984	Mulroney	May 23, 2004
John Robertson	Liberal	New Brunswick	October 23, 1867	Royal Proclamation	August 3, 1876
Fernand Robichaud	Liberal	Saint-Louis-de-Kent; New Brunswick^{3}	September 22, 1997	Chrétien	December 2, 2014
Hédard-J. Robichaud	Liberal	Gloucester	June 28, 1968	Trudeau, P. E.	October 8, 1971
Louis Robichaud	Liberal	L'Acadie-Acadia	December 21, 1973	Trudeau, P. E.	October 21, 2000
Clifford Robinson	Liberal	Moncton	May 5, 1924	King	July 27, 1944
Calixte Savoie	Independent Liberal	L'Acadie	July 28, 1955	St. Laurent	August 23, 1970
Cyril Sherwood	Progressive Conservative	Royal	October 3, 1979	Clark	July 1, 1990
Jean-Maurice Simard	Progressive Conservative	Edmundston	June 26, 1985	Mulroney	June 16, 2001
Benjamin Franklin Smith	Conservative	Victoria-Carleton	April 14, 1935	Bennett	May 19, 1944
Jabez Bunting Snowball	Liberal	Chatham	May 1, 1891	MacDonald	February 1, 1902
William Steeves	Liberal	New Brunswick	October 23, 1867	Royal Proclamation	December 9, 1873
Carolyn Stewart-Olsen	Conservative	New Brunswick	August 27, 2009	Harper	July 27, 2021
Austin C. Taylor	Liberal	Westmorland	January 3, 1957	St. Laurent	January 17, 1965
Nancy Teed	Progressive Conservative	Saint John	August 30, 1990	Mulroney	January 29, 1993
Thomas Temple	Conservative	York	April 23, 1896	Bowell	August 25, 1899
Norbert Thériault	Liberal	Baie-du-Vin	March 26, 1979	Trudeau, P. E.	February 16, 1996
Frederick Thompson	Liberal	Fredericton	February 7, 1902	Laurier	April 27, 1922
David Adams Richards	Conservative	New Brunswick	August 30, 2017	Trudeau, J.	October 17, 2025
William Henry Thorne	Conservative	Saint John	July 26, 1913	Borden	July 8, 1923
Irving Randall Todd	Conservative	Milltown	March 7, 1918	Borden	December 27, 1932
Marilyn Trenholme Counsell	Liberal	New Brunswick	September 9, 2003	Chrétien	October 22, 2008
Onésiphore Turgeon	Liberal	Gloucester	October 27, 1922	King	November 18, 1944
Clarence Joseph Veniot	Liberal	Gloucester	April 18, 1945	King	June 1, 1966
John D. Wallace	No Affiliation	New Brunswick	January 2, 2009	Harper	February 1, 2017
David Wark	Liberal	Fredericton	October 23, 1867	Royal Proclamation	August 20, 1905
Robert Wilmot	Conservative	New Brunswick	October 23, 1867	Royal Proclamation	February 10, 1880
Josiah Wood	Conservative	Westmorland	August 5, 1895	Bowell	March 12, 1912

Notes:

^{1} Senators are appointed to represent New Brunswick. Each senator may choose to designate a geographic area within New Brunswick as their division.
^{2} Senators are appointed by the governor general on the recommendation of the prime minister. ^{3} Division designated as Saint-Louis-de-Kent from September 23, 1997 to February 27, 2010 and New Brunswick from February 28, 2010 to the present.

== Maritimes regional senators ==
Senators listed were appointed to represent the Maritimes under section 26 of the Constitution Act. This clause has only been used once before to appoint two extra senators to represent four regional Senate divisions: Ontario, Quebec, the Maritimes and the Western Provinces.

As vacancies open up among the normal members of the Senate, they are automatically filled by the regional senators. Regional senators may also designate themselves to a senate division in any province of their choosing in their region.

Name	Party^{1}	Division^{2}	Date appointed	Appointed by^{3}	Date shifted to provincial	Province shifted to	Provincial seat vacated by	End of term
Michael Forrestall	Conservative	Dartmouth/Eastern Shore, NS	September 27, 1990	Mulroney	November 10, 1994	Nova Scotia	Robert Muir	June 9, 2006
James W. Ross	Progressive Conservative	Maritimes divisional	September 27, 1990	Mulroney	April 26, 1991	New Brunswick	Richard Hatfield	May 25, 1993

Notes:

^{1} Party listed was the last party of which the senator was a member.
^{2} Senators are appointed to represent their region. Each senator may choose to designate a geographic area within their region as their division.
^{3} Senators are appointed by the governor general on the recommendation of the prime minister.

== Declined Senate appointments ==
Only three people have ever declined a Senate appointment, two from New Brunswick and one from Quebec.

Name	Party	Date appointed	Appointed by
William Todd	Conservative	October 23, 1867	Royal Proclamation
Edward Chandler	Liberal-Conservative	October 23, 1867	Royal Proclamation

== See also ==
- Lists of Canadian senators
