= List of people from Charlotte County, New Brunswick =

This is a list of notable people from Charlotte County, New Brunswick. Although not everyone in this list was born in Charlotte County, they all live or have lived in Charlotte County and have had significant connections to the communities.

Full name	Community	Notable for	Birth	Death	Other
James Brown		politician			
Norman Buchanan (MC)	St. Stephen	military	1915	2008	member of the New Brunswick Sports Hall of Fame, politician, businessman
George Johnson Clarke		politician			lawyer, journalist, and politician, premier of New Brunswick 1914–1917
J. Howard Crocker	St. Stephen	educator and sports executive	1870	1959	physical education director for the YMCA and University of Western Ontario, executive with the Amateur Athletic Union of Canada and the Canadian Olympic Committee
Gilbert Ganong	Springfield	co-founder of Ganong Bros. Limited	1851	1917	lieutenant governor of New Brunswick
Hardy N. Ganong	St. Stephen	sportsman, soldier, businessman	1890	1963	
Alexander Gibson	Oak Bay, New Brunswick	industrialist	1819	1913	founder of Marysville
Arthur Hill Gillmor		politician			member of the Canadian House of Commons and Senate
Richard Hanson	Bocabec, Charlotte County, New Brunswick	politician	1879	1948	
Henry Irwin		politician			
James Charles McKeagney		politician			lawyer, politician, and judge
Alfred Needler					scientist, administrator, diplomat and statesman
Benjamin Robert Stephenson		politician			lawyer and politician
George Dixon Street		politician			lawyer, judge and political figure
A. Wesley Stuart					commercial fisherman and politician
Don Sweeney	St. Stephen	hockey player	1966		
David Walker	St. Stephen	writer	1911	1992	born in Scotland; two of his novels were made into feature films
Paul Watson					environmental activist

== See also ==
- List of people from New Brunswick
