= Grimmer =

Grimmer is a surname. Notable people with the surname include:

- Abel Grimmer (c. 1570–c. 1620), Flemish painter
- Bärbel Grimmer (born 1945), German swimmer
- Bernd Grimmer (1950-2021), German politician
- George Grimmer (1827–1907), Canadian-American politician from Wisconsin
- George S. Grimmer (1826–1887), Canadian lawyer and politician
- Gerhard Grimmer (born 1943), East German cross-country skier
- Irvine Grimmer (1862–1951), South African cricketer
- Jack Grimmer (born 1994), Scottish footballer
- Jacob Grimmer (c. 1526–1590), Flemish painter
- Margot Grimmer (born 1944), American ballet dancer
- Mineko Grimmer (born 1949), American installation sound artist
- Robert Watson Grimmer (1866–1948), Canadian merchant and politician
- Thomas Duncan Grimmer (1828–1893), American politician from Wisconsin
- Wayne Grimmer (born 1960), Canadian field hockey player
- W.C.H. Grimmer (1858–1945), Canadian lawyer and politician

== See also ==
- Disappearance of Cheryl Grimmer (born 1966)

== See also ==
- Grimmer Parish, New Brunswick
- Mann & Grimmer M.1, World War I fighter aircraft
