= Senator Gillmor =

Senator Gillmor may refer to:

== Senate of Canada ==
- Arthur Hill Gillmor (1824–1903), Senator from New Brunswick from 1900 to 1903
- Daniel Gillmor (1849–1918), Senate from New Brunswick from 1907 to 1918

== United States state senate members ==
- Karen Gillmor (born 1948), Ohio State Senate
- Paul Gillmor (1939–2007), Ohio State Senate

== Other uses ==
- Senator Gilmore (disambiguation)
