= CHCT-TV =

The callsign CHCT-TV may refer to these television stations that previously used the callsign:

- CICT-DT, Calgary, Alberta, Canada
- CHCO-TV, St. Andrews, New Brunswick, Canada
