= New Brunswick Southwest =

Federal electoral district in New Brunswick, Canada

New Brunswick electoral district
- Interactive map of riding boundaries from the 2025 federal election
- Coordinates: 45.503°N 66.818°W

Federal electoral district
- Legislature: House of Commons
MP
John Williamson
Conservative
- District created: 1996
- First contested: 1997
- Last contested: 2025
- District webpage: profile, map

Demographics
- Population (2021): 80,192
- Electors (2025): 67,567
- Area (km²): 10,770
- Pop. density (per km²): 7.4
- Census division(s): Charlotte, Kings, Queens, Sunbury, York
- Census subdivision(s): Saint John (part), St. Stephen, Sunbury-York South, Eastern Charlotte, Grand Bay-Westfield, Butternut Valley, Valley Waters (part), Harvey (part), Arcadia (part), Saint Andrews

New Brunswick Southwest French: Nouveau-Brunswick-Sud-Ouest; formerly Charlotte, St. Croix—Belleisle, and Saint John—St. Croix) is a federal electoral district in New Brunswick, Canada, that has been represented in the House of Commons of Canada since 2004. Its population in 2016 was 65,287.

== Demographics ==
According to the 2011 Canadian census; 2013 representation

Ethnic groups: 97.1% White, 1.9% Aboriginal
Languages: 94.4% English, 4.1% French
Religions: 79.8% Christian (22.7% Catholic, 16.2% Baptist, 13.3% Anglican, 10.0% United Church, 5.8% Pentecostal, 2.2% Presbyterian, 9.6% Other), 19.8% No religion
Median income (2010): $27,133
Average income (2010): $34,743

== Geography ==
As the name implies, the district comprises the southwestern portion of New Brunswick. It includes all of Charlotte County and portions of York, Sunbury, Queens, Kings and Saint John Counties.

The neighbouring ridings are Tobique—Mactaquac, Fredericton—Oromocto, Miramichi—Grand Lake, Fundy Royal, and Saint John—Kennebecasis.

== History ==
"Charlotte" riding was created in 1867. In 1966, it was merged into Carleton—Charlotte.

"Charlotte" riding was re-created in 1996 primarily from Carleton—Charlotte, and incorporating parts of Fundy—Royal, Saint John, and Fredericton—York—Sunbury ridings. Shortly after the 1997 election, the riding became known as "New Brunswick Southwest".

The 2003 redistribution abolished New Brunswick Southwest. The territory of the riding was combined with the area around Belleisle Bay in south-central New Brunswick), and named "St. Croix—Belleisle". This riding was renamed "New Brunswick Southwest" in 2004.

The 2012 federal electoral redistribution saw this riding gain territory from Fredericton, and lose small portions to Fredericton and Fundy Royal.

Following the 2022 federal electoral redistribution, the riding was largely replaced by Saint John—St. Croix. It gained the City of Saint John west of the St. John River from Saint John—Rothesay, it gained Burton from Fredericton and lost the Parishes of Dumfries, Prince William, Manners Sutton, Kingsclear, and the municipalities of Hanwell, and Harvey and the Indian Reserve of Kingsclear 6 to Tobique—Mactaquac. These changes came into effect upon the calling of the 2025 Canadian federal election.

The riding's name was reverted to New Brunswick Southwest (French: Nouveau-Brunswick-Sud-Ouest) in 2026 as part of Bill C-25 of the 45th Canadian Parliament.

Historical population
Year	Pop.	±%
2001	63,529	—
2006	63,232	−0.5%
2011	63,618	+0.6%
2016	65,287	+2.6%
2021	67,781	+3.8%

=== Members of Parliament ===
This riding has elected the following members of Parliament:

Parliament	Years	Member	Party
Charlotte
1st	1867–1872	John Bolton	Liberal
2nd	1872–1874	John McAdam	Liberal–Conservative
3rd	1874–1878	Arthur Hill Gillmor	Liberal
4th	1878–1882	Arthur Hill Gillmor	Liberal
5th	1882–1887	Arthur Hill Gillmor	Liberal
6th	1887–1891	Arthur Hill Gillmor	Liberal
7th	1891–1896	Arthur Hill Gillmor	Liberal
8th	1896–1900	Gilbert Ganong	Liberal–Conservative
9th	1900–1904	Gilbert Ganong	Liberal–Conservative
10th	1904–1908	Gilbert Ganong	Liberal–Conservative
11th	1908–1911	William Frederick Todd	Liberal
12th	1911–1917	Thomas Aaron Hartt	Conservative
13th	1917–1921	Thomas Aaron Hartt	Conservative
14th	1921–1925	Robert Watson Grimmer	Conservative
15th	1925–1926	Robert Watson Grimmer	Conservative
16th	1926–1930	Robert Watson Grimmer	Conservative
17th	1930–1935	Arthur D. Ganong	Conservative
18th	1935–1940	Burton Hill	Liberal
19th	1940–1945	Burton Hill	Liberal
20th	1945–1949	A. Wesley Stuart	Liberal
21st	1949–1953	A. Wesley Stuart	Liberal
22nd	1953–1957	A. Wesley Stuart	Liberal
23rd	1957–1958	A. Wesley Stuart	Liberal
24th	1958–1962	Caldwell Stewart	Progressive Conservative
25th	1962–1963	Allan M.A. McLean	Liberal
26th	1963–1965	Allan M.A. McLean	Liberal
27th	1965–1968	Allan M.A. McLean	Liberal
Riding dissolved into Carleton—Charlotte
Riding re-created from Carleton—Charlotte, Fundy—Royal, Saint John and Fredericton—York—Sunbury
36th	1997–2000	Greg Thompson	Progressive Conservative
New Brunswick Southwest
37th	2000–2003	Greg Thompson	Progressive Conservative
37th	2003–2004	Greg Thompson	Conservative
St. Croix—Belleisle
38th	2004–2006	Greg Thompson	Conservative
New Brunswick Southwest
39th	2006–2008	Greg Thompson	Conservative
40th	2008–2011	Greg Thompson	Conservative
41st	2011–2015	John Williamson	Conservative
42nd	2015–2019	Karen Ludwig	Liberal
43rd	2019–2021	John Williamson	Conservative
44th	2021–2025	John Williamson	Conservative
Saint John—St. Croix
45th	2025–present	John Williamson	Conservative

== Election results ==
Graph of election results in Charlotte (1996–1998), New Brunswick Southwest (1998–2003), St. Croix—Belleisle, New Brunswick Southwest (2004–present) (1996–, minor parties that never got 2% of the vote or didn't run consistently are omitted)

=== Saint John—St. Croix ===
2025 Canadian federal election: Saint John—St. Croix
Party	Candidate	Votes	%	±%	Expenditures
Conservative	John Williamson	26,591	53.08	+6.09	$125,259.43
Liberal	Karen Ludwig	20,784	41.49	+13.42	$57,294.45
New Democratic	Andrew Hill	1,643	3.28	−9.81	$5,288.15
Green	Gerald Irish	794	1.59	−2.46	none listed
Libertarian	Keith Tays	280	0.56	+0.51	$0.00
Total valid votes/expense limit		50,092	99.29	–0.05	$126,715.06
Total rejected ballots		356	0.71	+0.05	
Turnout		50,448	74.66	+9.28	
Eligible voters		67,567			
Conservative notional hold		Swing		−3.67	
Source: Elections Canada
Note: number of eligible voters does not include voting day registrations.

2021 federal election redistributed results
Party	Vote	%
Conservative	20,017	47.00
Liberal	11,955	28.07
New Democratic	5,575	13.09
People's	3,255	7.64
Green	1,723	4.05
Independent	37	0.09
Libertarian	19	0.04
Communist	9	0.02
Total valid votes	42,590	99.34
Rejected ballots	283	0.66
Registered voters/ estimated turnout	65,572	65.38

=== New Brunswick Southwest, 2004–2025 ===
Graph of election results in New Brunswick Southwest (2004-, minor parties that never got 2% of the vote or didn't run consistently are omitted)

2021 Canadian federal election
Party	Candidate	Votes	%	±%	Expenditures
Conservative	John Williamson	18,309	50.0	+0.8	$75,984.11
Liberal	Jason Hickey	8,750	23.9	-1.6	$51,273.87
New Democratic	Richard Trevor Warren	4,893	13.4	+5.2	$814.71
People's	Meryl Sarty	3,090	8.4	+5.3	$6,020.69
Green	John Reist	1,587	4.3	-9.2	$3,397.49
Total valid votes/expense limit		36,629	99.4	–	$105,371.47
Total rejected ballots		239	0.6		
Turnout		36,868	67.4		
Eligible voters		54,730			
Conservative hold		Swing		+1.2	
Source: Elections Canada

2019 Canadian federal election
Party	Candidate	Votes	%	±%	Expenditures
Conservative	John Williamson	19,451	49.15	+10.59	$88,037.67
Liberal	Karen Ludwig	10,110	25.54	-18.38	$77,377.08
Green	Susan Jonah	5,352	13.52	+8.57	$7,039.17
New Democratic	Doug Mullin	3,251	8.21	-4.36	$0.00
People's	Meryl Sarty	1,214	3.07	-	$5,133.77
Veterans Coalition	Abe Scott	200	0.51	-	$0.00
Total valid votes/expense limit		39,578	100.00		
Total rejected ballots		301	0,75	+0.17	
Turnout		39,879	74,46	+0.21	
Eligible voters		53,556			
Conservative gain from Liberal		Swing		+14.49	
Source: Elections Canada

2015 Canadian federal election
Party	Candidate	Votes	%	±%	Expenditures
Liberal	Karen Ludwig	16,656	43.92	+30.36	$58,390.36
Conservative	John Williamson	14,625	38.56	-18.10	$115,782.35
New Democratic	Andrew Graham	4,768	12.57	-10.74	$14,930.22
Green	Gayla MacIntosh	1,877	4.95	-0.15	$1,331.74
Total valid votes/expense limit		37,926	100.00		$198,596.97
Total rejected ballots		220	0.58	-0.01	
Turnout		38,146	74.25	+9.54	
Eligible voters		51,376			
Liberal gain from Conservative		Swing		+24.23	
Source: Elections Canada

2011 federal election redistributed results
Party	Vote	%
Conservative	18,701	56.66
New Democratic	7,693	23.31
Liberal	4,476	13.56
Green	1,682	5.10
Others	453	1.37

2011 Canadian federal election
Party	Candidate	Votes	%	±%	Expenditures
Conservative	John Williamson	18,066	56.64	-1.68	$46,347.59
New Democratic	Andrew Graham	7,413	23.24	+6.69	$7,703.67
Liberal	Kelly Wilson	4,320	13.54	-6.03	$25,159.26
Green	Janice Harvey	1,646	5.16	-0.40	$7,546.35
Christian Heritage	Jason Farris	450	1.41	–	$2,698.60
Total valid votes/expense limit		31,895	100.0		$81,201.04
Total rejected, unmarked and declined ballots		188	0.59	-0.01	
Turnout		32,083	64.71	+3.54	
Eligible voters		49,578			
Conservative hold		Swing		-4.18	

2008 Canadian federal election
Party	Candidate	Votes	%	±%	Expenditures
Conservative	Greg Thompson	17,474	58.32	+3.52	$40,981.82
Liberal	Nancy MacIntosh	5,863	19.57	-7.22	$19,548.24
New Democratic	Andrew Graham	4,958	16.55	+0.92	$4,704.82
Green	Robert Wayne Boucher	1,667	5.56	+2.78	$33.90
Total valid votes/expense limit		29,962	100.0		$78,512
Total rejected, unmarked and declined ballots		180	0.60	-0.03	
Turnout		30,142	61.17	-5.62	
Eligible voters		49,273			
Conservative hold		Swing		+5.37	

2006 Canadian federal election
Party	Candidate	Votes	%	±%	Expenditures
Conservative	Greg Thompson	18,155	54.80	+1.74	$32,170.17
Liberal	Stan Smith	8,877	26.79	-4.72	$21,541.46
New Democratic	Andrew Graham	5,178	15.63	+3.94	3,438.46
Green	Erik Millett	922	2.78	-0.34	$0.50
Total valid votes/expense limit		33,132	100.0		$73,312
Total rejected, unmarked and declined ballots		210	0.63		
Turnout		33,342	66.79		
Eligible voters		49,921			
Conservative hold		Swing		+3.23	

2004 Canadian federal election
Party	Candidate	Votes	%	±%	Expenditures
Conservative	Greg Thompson	16,339	53.06	-14.48	$41,476.00
Liberal	Jim Dunlap	9,702	31.51	+3.25	$55,323.96
New Democratic	Patrick Webber	3,600	11.69	+7.49	$81.90
Green	Erik Millett	960	3.12	–	$797.55
Canadian Action	David Szemerda	194	0.63	–	none listed
Total valid votes/expense limit		30,795	100.0		$71,262
Total rejected, unmarked and declined ballots		216	0.70		
Turnout		31,011	62.23	-5.12	
Eligible voters		49,834			
Conservative notional gain from Progressive Conservative		Swing		-8.86	
Changes from 2000 are based on redistributed results. Change for the Conservative Party is based on the combined totals of the Progressive Conservative Party and the Canadian Alliance.

=== St. Croix—Belleisle, 2003–04 ===
2000 federal election redistributed results
Party	Vote	%
Progressive Conservative	14,900	46.23
Liberal	9,107	28.26
Alliance	6,869	21.31
New Democratic	1,353	4.20

=== New Brunswick Southwest, 1998–2003 ===
2000 Canadian federal election
Party	Candidate	Votes	%	±%
Progressive Conservative	Greg Thompson	14,489	47.2	+2.3
Liberal	Winston Gamblin	8,442	27.5	+1.8
Alliance	John Erbs	6,562	21.4	+0.4
New Democratic	Habib Kilisli	1,173	3.8	-3.6
Total valid votes		30,666	100.0	

=== Charlotte, 1996–98 ===
1997 Canadian federal election
Party	Candidate	Votes	%
Progressive Conservative	Greg Thompson	14,533	44.9
Liberal	Harold Culbert	8,309	25.7
Reform	Eric Banks	6,814	21.0
New Democratic	Rob Rainer	2,397	7.4
Natural Law	Thomas Mitchell	280	0.9
Total valid votes		32,333	100.0

=== Charlotte, 1867–1966 historical elections ===
Graph of election results in Charlotte (1867–1966, minor parties that never got 2% of the vote or didn't run consistently are omitted)

1965 Canadian federal election
Party	Candidate	Votes	%	±%
Liberal	Allan McLean	6,279	50.8	-2.2
Progressive Conservative	Caldwell Stewart	5,226	45.2	+0.6
New Democratic	George Cogswell	462	4.0	+3.0
Total valid votes		11,967	100.0	

1963 Canadian federal election
Party	Candidate	Votes	%	±%
Liberal	Allan McLean	6,279	53.0	+2.0
Progressive Conservative	Norman Buchanan	5,284	44.6	-1.1
Social Credit	David Cormack	159	1.3	*
New Democratic	George Cogswell	118	1.0	-2.3
Total valid votes		11,840	100.0	

1962 Canadian federal election
Party	Candidate	Votes	%	±%
Liberal	Allan McLean	6,159	51.0	+3.6
Progressive Conservative	Caldwell Stewart	5,518	45.7	-6.9
New Democratic	Robert Bontaine	396	3.3	*
Total valid votes		12,073	100.0	

1958 Canadian federal election
Party	Candidate	Votes	%	±%
Progressive Conservative	Caldwell Stewart	5,756	52.6	+5.2
Liberal	Wesley Stuart	5,806	47.4	-5.2
Total valid votes		11,562	100.0	

1957 Canadian federal election
Party	Candidate	Votes	%	±%
Liberal	Wesley Stuart	6,393	52.6	+0.2
Progressive Conservative	Lorne B. Groom	5,756	47.4	+3.3
Total valid votes		12,149	100.0	

1953 Canadian federal election
Party	Candidate	Votes	%	±%
Liberal	Wesley Stuart	6,155	52.4	+2.2
Progressive Conservative	Hardy N. Ganong	5,180	44.1	-5.4
Co-operative Commonwealth	Tom William Jones	416	3.5	*
Total valid votes		11,751	100.0	

1949 Canadian federal election
Party	Candidate	Votes	%	±%
Liberal	Wesley Stuart	6,197	50.2	+0.1
Progressive Conservative	Hardy N. Ganong	6,139	49.8	-0.1
Total valid votes		12,336	100.0	

1945 Canadian federal election
Party	Candidate	Votes	%	±%
Liberal	Wesley Stuart	5,486	50.1	-8.0
Progressive Conservative	Chauncey Randall Pollard	5,456	49.9	+8.0
Total valid votes		10,942	100.0	

1940 Canadian federal election
Party	Candidate	Votes	%	±%
Liberal	Burton M. Hill	6,099	58.1	+6.6
Conservative	Walter DeWolfe	4,391	41.9	+9.8
Total valid votes		10,490	100.0	

1935 Canadian federal election
Party	Candidate	Votes	%	±%
Liberal	Burton M. Hill	5,436	51.5	+9.3
Conservative	Chauncey Randall Pollard	3,386	32.1	-25.7
Reconstruction	Walter Quartermain	1,732	16.4	*
Total valid votes		10,554	100.0	

1930 Canadian federal election
Party	Candidate	Votes	%	±%
Conservative	Arthur D. Ganong	5,595	57.8	+0.3
Liberal	John Scovil	4,092	42.2	-0.3
Total valid votes		9,687	100.0	
Source(s) "Charlotte, New Brunswick (1867-08-06 - 1968-04-22)". History of Federal Ridings Since 1867. Library of Parliament.

1926 Canadian federal election
Party	Candidate	Votes	%	±%
Conservative	Robert Watson Grimmer	4,967	57.5	-4.9
Liberal	Elmer McLaughlin	3,677	42.5	+4.9
Total valid votes		8,644	100.0	

1925 Canadian federal election
Party	Candidate	Votes	%	±%
Conservative	Robert Watson Grimmer	5,202	62.4	+11.8
Liberal	William Albert Holt	3,274	37.6	-11.8
Total valid votes		8,476	100.0	

1921 Canadian federal election
Party	Candidate	Votes	%	±%
Conservative	Robert Watson Grimmer	5,202	50.6	-4.6
Liberal	William Frederick Todd	5,069	49.4	+4.6
Total valid votes		10,271	100.0	

1917 Canadian federal election
Party	Candidate	Votes	%	±%
Government (Unionist)	Thomas Aaron Hartt	3,248	55.2	+3.2
Opposition (Laurier Liberals)	William Frederick Todd	2,489	44.8	-3.3
Total valid votes		5,737	100.0	

1911 Canadian federal election
Party	Candidate	Votes	%	±%
Conservative	Thomas Aaron Hartt	2,685	51.9	+3.8
Liberal	William Frederick Todd	2,489	48.1	-3.9
Total valid votes		5,174	100.0	

1908 Canadian federal election
Party	Candidate	Votes	%	±%
Liberal	William Frederick Todd	2,691	51.9	+4.5
Conservative	Gilbert White Ganong	2,491	48.1	-4.5
Total valid votes		5,182	100.0	

1904 Canadian federal election
Party	Candidate	Votes	%	±%
Conservative	Gilbert White Ganong	2,574	52.6	-3.2
Liberal	Daniel Gillmor	2,320	47.4	+3.2
Total valid votes		4,894	100.0	

1900 Canadian federal election
Party	Candidate	Votes	%	±%
Conservative	Gilbert White Ganong	2,785	55.8	+0.5
Liberal	Robert Armstrong	2,205	44.2	-0.5
Total valid votes		4,990	100.0	

1896 Canadian federal election
Party	Candidate	Votes	%	±%
Conservative	Gilbert White Ganong	2,453	55.3	+8.7
Liberal	Arthur Hill Gillmor	1,981	44.7	-8.7
Total valid votes		4,434	100.0	

1891 Canadian federal election
Party	Candidate	Votes	%	±%
Liberal	Arthur Hill Gillmor	1,934	53.4	+2.3
Conservative	George J. Clarke	1,686	46.6	-2.3
Total valid votes		3,620	100.0	

1887 Canadian federal election
Party	Candidate	Votes	%	±%
Liberal	Arthur Hill Gillmor	1,892	51.1	-4.5
Conservative	John D. Chipman	1,811	48.9	+4.5
Total valid votes		3,703	100.0	

1882 Canadian federal election
Party	Candidate	Votes	%	±%
Liberal	Arthur Hill Gillmor	1,558	55.6	+1.4
Conservative	Benjamin Robert Stephenson	1,244	44.4	-1.4
Total valid votes		2,802	100.0	

1878 Canadian federal election
Party	Candidate	Votes	%	±%
Liberal	Arthur Hill Gillmor	1,522	54.2	-1.2
Conservative	John McAdam	1,284	45.8	+1.2
Total valid votes		2,806	100.0	

1874 Canadian federal election
Party	Candidate	Votes	%	±%
Liberal	Arthur Hill Gillmor	1,518	55.4	+9.3
Conservative	John McAdam	1,222	44.6	-9.3
Total valid votes		2,740	100.0	
Source(s) "Charlotte, New Brunswick (1867-08-06 - 1968-04-22)". History of Federal Ridings Since 1867. Library of Parliament.

1872 Canadian federal election
Party	Candidate	Votes	%	±%
Conservative	John McAdam	1,551	53.9	
Liberal	Arthur Hill Gillmor	1,329	46.1	-10.8
Total valid votes		2,880	100.0	
Source: Canadian Elections Database

1867 Canadian federal election
Party	Candidate	Votes	%
Liberal	John Bolton	1,061	56.9
Unknown	Robert Thompson	671	43.1
Total valid votes		1,732	100.0
Source: Canadian Elections Database

== See also ==
- List of Canadian electoral districts
- Historical federal electoral districts of Canada
