= Walter Dickson =

Walter Dickson may refer to:

- Walter Dickson (author) (1916–1990), Swedish author
- Walter Hamilton Dickson (1806–1885), lawyer and political figure in Canada West
- Walter Michael Dickson (1884–1915), Scottish rugby player
- Walter Brittain Dickson (1847–1916), Canadian politician, member of the Legislative Assembly of New Brunswick
- Walt Dickson, American Major League Baseball player
