= George Johnson Clarke =

Canadian politician

The Honourable George Johnson Clarke KC

15th Premier of New Brunswick
- In office December 17, 1914 – February 1, 1917
- Monarch: George V
- Lieutenant Governor: Josiah Wood
- Preceded by: James Kidd Flemming
- Succeeded by: James Alexander Murray

MLA for Charlotte
- In office March 3, 1903 – February 24, 1917 Serving with George F. Hill, Henry I. Taylor, Thomas A. Hartt, Scott D. Guptill, W.C.H. Grimmer
- Preceded by: James O'Brien
- Succeeded by: Harry D. Smith

Personal details
- Born: October 10, 1857 St. Andrews, New Brunswick
- Died: February 26, 1917 (aged 59) St. Stephen, New Brunswick
- Party: Conservative
- Spouse: Bessie McKeown (m. 1889)
- Children: 2 daughters
- Occupation: Lawyer, journalist
- Profession: Politician

George Johnson Clarke KC (October 10, 1857 – February 26, 1917) was a New Brunswick lawyer, journalist and politician.

A native of St. Andrews, New Brunswick, George Clarke taught school for a time in Charlotte County before studying law. He was called to the bar in 1885 and set up practice in St. Stephen. He was also editor of the Saint Croix Courier newspaper in St. Stephen. In 1907, he was named King's Counsel.

In 1891, Clarke was an unsuccessful candidate in the Charlotte riding for a seat in the House of Commons of Canada. He served as mayor of St. Stephen from 1898 to 1899 and was Warden of Charlotte County. He was elected to the Legislative Assembly of New Brunswick for Charlotte County in 1903 and served as Speaker of the Legislative Assembly of New Brunswick from 1909 to 1914. On January 22, 1914, Clarke was appointed by Premier James K. Flemming to the province's Executive Council as Attorney General and Commissioner of Provincial Hospitals. He served until December 17 of that year when he was appointed Minister of Lands and Mines, a position he held until February 1, 1917.

Highly regarded for his integrity, George Clarke became the 15th premier of New Brunswick in March 1914 when his predecessor, James Kidd Flemming, was forced to resign as a result of a scandal. In addition to his responsibilities as Premier, Clarke also served as the Minister of Lands and Mines during his entire administration.

George Clarke was in very poor health during his time in office and his administration's accomplishments were limited. Because of the health problems, he stepped down as premier on February 1, 1917, handing over the reins of power to James Alexander Murray just before the general election. Clarke had been selected for appointment as the province's Lieutenant Governor but was not able to accept the post due to poor health. Clarke died at home in St. Stephen a few weeks later.

1891 Canadian federal election: Charlotte
Party	Candidate	Votes	%	±%
Liberal	Arthur Hill Gillmor	1,934	53.4	+2.3
Conservative	George J. Clarke	1,686	46.6	-2.3
Total valid votes		3,620	100.0	

New Brunswick provincial government of George Johnson Clarke
Cabinet posts (2)
Predecessor	Office	Successor
James A. Murray	'Minister of Lands and Mines'; 1914-1917	A. R. Slipp
W.C.H. Grimmer	'Attorney General of New Brunswick'; 1914-1914	John B. M. Baxter
New Brunswick provincial government of James Kidd Flemming
Cabinet post (1)
Predecessor	Office	Successor
W.C.H. Grimmer	'Attorney General of New Brunswick'; 1914-1914	John B. M. Baxter
Other offices
Preceded by James K. Flemming	Leader of the Progressive Conservative Party of New Brunswick; 1914-1917	Succeeded by James A. Murray
Preceded by Donald Morrison	Speaker of the Legislative Assembly of New Brunswick; 1909–1914	Succeeded by Walter B. Dickson
