= John McAdam (politician) =

Canadian politician

Member of Parliament for Charlotte
- In office 1872–1874
- Preceded by: John Bolton
- Succeeded by: Arthur H. Gillmor

Personal details
- Born: March 28, 1807 Ireland
- Died: March 15, 1893 (aged 85) Oak Bay, New Brunswick
- Party: Liberal-Conservative Party
- Profession: lumber merchant

John McAdam (March 28, 1807, Ireland – March 15, 1893) was a politician and businessman in New Brunswick, Canada.

Born near Belfast, McAdam became a lumber merchant in Milltown, New Brunswick. He married a Miss Murchie.

He was elected to the Legislative Assembly of New Brunswick in 1854 as a Liberal-Conservative to represent the electoral district of Charlotte until 1872 when he was elected to the House of Commons of Canada in the riding of Charlotte and defeated there in 1874 and 1878. He was re-elected to the New Brunswick legislature in 1882 until 1886.

During his time in New Brunswick politics, he was a Member of the Executive Council between September 1867 and October 1, 1870. He was Commissioner of Public Works between 1867 and 1868 and he served as President of the Executive Council between 1868 and 1870.

McAdam had numerous land grants in the Canterbury Parish and Dumfries Parish, and left his name there to McAdam Junction, a railway town that sprang up because of the lumber trade.

1878 Canadian federal election: Charlotte
Party	Candidate	Votes	%	±%
Liberal	Arthur Hill Gillmor	1,522	54.2	-1.2
Conservative	John McAdam	1,284	45.8	+1.2
Total valid votes		2,806	100.0	

1874 Canadian federal election: Charlotte
Party	Candidate	Votes	%	±%
Liberal	Arthur Hill Gillmor	1,518	55.4	+9.3
Conservative	John McAdam	1,222	44.6	-9.3
Total valid votes		2,740	100.0	
Source(s) "Charlotte, New Brunswick (1867-08-06 - 1968-04-22)". History of Federal Ridings Since 1867. Library of Parliament.

1872 Canadian federal election: Charlotte
Party	Candidate	Votes	%	±%
Conservative	John McAdam	1,551	53.9	
Liberal	Arthur Hill Gillmor	1,329	46.1	-10.8
Total valid votes		2,880	100.0	
Source: Canadian Elections Database
