= Hardy N. Ganong =

Canadian military commander and sportsman

Hardy Nelson Ganong
- Born: April 18, 1890; St. Stephen, New Brunswick, Canada
- Died: February 24, 1963 (aged 72); Route 1, Charlotte County, New Brunswick, Canada
- Burial place: St. Stephen Rural Cemetery
- Military career
- Allegiance: Canada
- Branch: Canadian Army
- Service years: 1909-1945
- Rank: Major General
- Commands: The Carleton and York Regiment; 3rd Infantry Brigade; 8th Infantry Division; 6th Infantry Division
- Conflicts: World War I: Vimy Ridge; World War II
- Other work: Director, New Brunswick Civil Defence

Major-General Hardy Nelson Ganong CBE, VD, ED (April 18, 1890 - February 24, 1963) was a Canadian sportsman and a military commander who served in both World War I and II.

== Early life ==
The son of Edward Morrison Ganong and Margaret A. Lunn, Hardy Ganong was born and educated in St. Stephen, New Brunswick. He was a cousin to the family that founded Ganong Bros. chocolate makers and after completing his schooling went to work in this business.

== World War I ==
In 1909, Hardy Ganong joined the Canadian Militia, then following the outbreak of World War I enlisted in the Canadian Expeditionary Force. He was sent overseas as part of the Canadian Expeditionary Force where he served on the battlefields of France as a member of the 5th Battalion Canadian Mounted Rifles. He was wounded in February 1917, suffering a gunshot wound to the left shoulder during a routine period with his unit in the trenches. He was discharged from hospital and was subsequently returned to duty in November 1917. Demobilized in 1919, he returned home where, in 1920, he married schoolteacher Mildred Viola Thomas of Calais, Maine with whom he had three children.

== World War II ==
During peacetime, Ganong remained as a member of the militia, and, by the time World War II broke out, he had risen to the rank of lieutenant colonel. Made commander of the Carleton and York Regiment, he led the regiment as the first Canadian military unit to ship to England for battle duty. In March 1941, Ganong took command of the 3rd Canadian Infantry Brigade and in July 1942 was promoted to major general. Sent back to Canada on the advice of Bernard Montgomery, he was appointed general officer to organize and command the 8th Canadian Infantry Division of the Home Service Divisions. Stationed for a time at Prince George, British Columbia, in October 1943 he was placed in command of the 6th Canadian Infantry Division headquartered on Vancouver Island, where he was in charge of preparations for participation in the invasion of Japan.

Ganong was awarded the Efficiency Decoration for his years of voluntary military service and in January 1944 was appointed a Commander of the Order of the British Empire. In December of that year, with Canadian participation in the invasion of Japan cancelled and a Pacific coastal defence no longer deemed necessary, he was assigned to command the Allied troops in Newfoundland, where he remained until his retirement in 1945. His son, Russell Edward Ganong, also served during the war with his father's old Carleton and York Regiment. He was killed during the Italian campaign on March 18, 1944. He was survived by his wife, Mary Mackenzie, and an infant son, Hardy MacKenzie Ganong, born September 29, 1943.

== Later life ==
Out of the army, Ganong served as honorary aide-de-camp to Governor Generals the Earl of Athlone, Vincent Massey and Georges Vanier. From 1955 to 1962 he was the full-time civil defence co-coordinator with responsibility for the organizing and training of all civil defence forces for the Province of New Brunswick.

=== Politics ===
A St. Stephen town councilor for two years, Ganong was the Progressive Conservative Party of Canada candidate in the 1949 Canadian federal election for the riding of New Brunswick Southwest. Of the 12,336 ballots cast, he lost by 58 votes to the Liberal incumbent, A. Wesley Stuart. He ran unsuccessfully against Stuart a second time in 1953.

1949 Canadian federal election: Charlotte
Party	Candidate	Votes	%	±%
Liberal	Wesley Stuart	6,197	50.2	+0.1
Progressive Conservative	Hardy N. Ganong	6,139	49.8	-0.1
Total valid votes		12,336	100.0	

1953 Canadian federal election: Charlotte
Party	Candidate	Votes	%	±%
Liberal	Wesley Stuart	6,155	52.4	+2.2
Progressive Conservative	Hardy N. Ganong	5,180	44.1	-5.4
Co-operative Commonwealth	Tom William Jones	416	3.5	*
Total valid votes		11,751	100.0	

=== Sporting and business interests ===
Ganong was also an active member of the executive committee of the New Brunswick Boy Scouts Association and served as the provincial movement's president. Among his other activities, he was vice-president of the N.B. Division, Canadian Red Cross, president, N.B. Boy Scouts Association, director, Charlotte County Board of Trade, Board member, Connors Bros. Ltd., and president of the New Brunswick Fish and Game Protective Association.

An avid curler, Ganong was president of the St. Stephen Curling Club for thirty-five years and president of the New Brunswick branch of the Royal Canadian Caledonia Curling Club. He was also voted president of the New Brunswick Curling Association for 1935–1936 term, and made its honorary president from 1941 to 1945. As a player, Ganong was 2nd stone on the St. Stephen team that won the 1930 Ganong Cup, a trophy donated by cousin Arthur Ganong given annually to the winner of the provincial curling championship. His team's win earned them the right to compete for the national title in the 1930 Macdonald Brier.

As much as he was enthusiastic about the sport of curling, Ganong was equally as passionate about harness racing. St. Stephen had a racetrack and he wrote a column on the sport for the local Saint Croix Courier weekly newspaper. He was also a racing judge at meets throughout New Brunswick and Maine and for two seasons was a judge at Exhibition Park Raceway in Saint John, New Brunswick.

== Death ==
Ganong and his wife died in February 1963 as a result of an auto accident during a winter snow storm on Route 1 in Charlotte County, New Brunswick while returning home from the city of Saint John. They are buried at the St. Stephen Rural Cemetery.

== Sources ==
- New Brunswick Sports Hall of Fame - 1930 curling champions
- Saint Croix Courier obituary for Hardy Ganong, February, 1963
- Telegraph-Journal obituary for Hardy Ganong, February 25, 1963
- Folster, David. The Chocolate Ganongs of St. Stephen, New Brunswick (1991) Goose Lane Editions ISBN 0-86492-115-2
- Craigs, Melodie. Ganong, The Candy Family (1984) Literacy Council of Fredericton ISBN 0-920333-16-8
- Granatstein, Jack L. (2005). The generals : the Canadian army's senior commanders in the Second World War. Calgary, Alta.: University of Calgary Press. ISBN 1-55238-176-5. OCLC 180772908.
- Generals of World War II
