= Doreen Colondres =

Puerto Rican chef, author

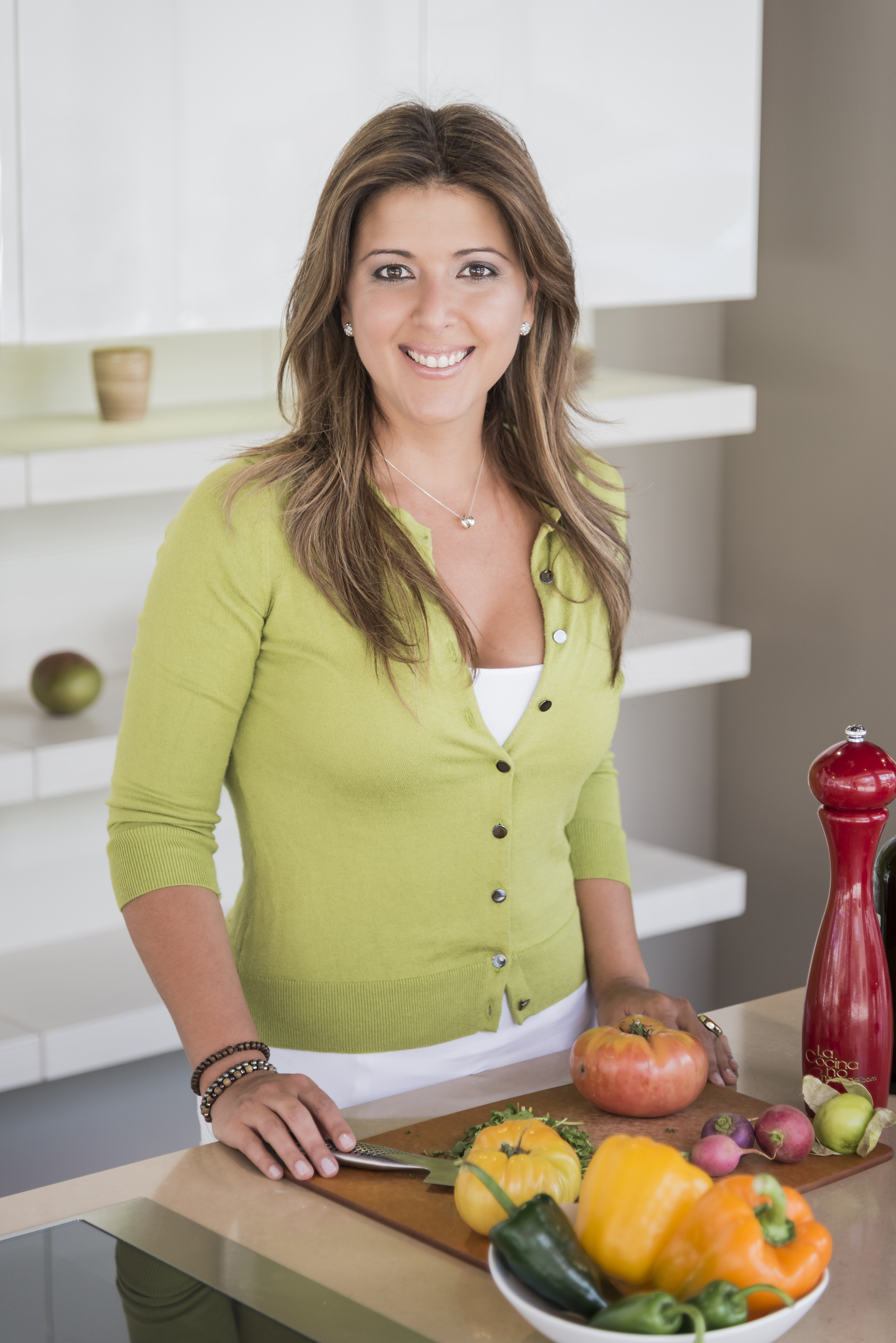
- Born: Puerto Rico
- Education: Universidad del Sagrado Corazón
- Culinary career
- Cooking style: Latin American cuisine
- Website: https://www.thekitchendoesntbite.com/

Doreen Colondres is a Puerto Rican chef wine educator and food writer, who is the author of La Cocina No Muerde (The Kitchen Doesn't Bite). She is considered a sommelier, television presenter and specialist in Hispanic cuisine.

== Biography ==
Born in Puerto Rico, Colondres' grandfather was a professional chef. She has a BA in Business Administration and Marketing from the Universidad del Sagrado Corazón, WSET L3 Certified, and has studied at culinary schools in New York, Spain, California, and Florida. In 2014 she became a brand ambassador for Bumble Bee Seafoods, one of the largest seafood companies in the USA and in 2013 became the first chef to represent the Bordeaux Wine Council in the US.

Colondres' first book, La Cocina No Muerde (The Kitchen Doesn't Bite), was published by Random Penguin House in June 2015, and became an Amazon bestseller. She worked on the Univisión show Despierta América, and hosted segments on cooking shows for Fox Life and Utilísima, for five years in 16 countries. She was a food and wine editor of Meredith Publishing for seven years, and currently has columns in more than 20 magazines around the world. She has performed more than 200 live cooking shows in the United States to raise awareness of obesity and diabetes. In 2019 she opened Vitis House, a wine and spirits school in Raleigh, North Carolina.
