= Senator Gilmore =

Senator Gilmore may refer to:

- Brenda Gilmore (born 1952), Tennessee State Senate
- Henry Gilmore (1832–1891), Massachusetts State Senate
- Joseph A. Gilmore (1811–1867), New Hampshire State Senate
- Pascal P. Gilmore (1845–1931), Maine State Senate
- Thomas R. Gilmore (1825–1899), Iowa State Senate
- Voit Gilmore (1918–2005), North Carolina State Senate
- William H. Gilmore (1839–1910), Vermont State Senate

== See also ==
- Senator Gillmor (disambiguation)
- John Adams Gilmer (1805–1865), North Carolina State Senate
- Peggy Gilmour (fl. 2010s), New Hampshire State Senate
