= Burton Hill =

Canadian politician

Member of Parliament for Charlotte
- In office October 1935 – April 1945
- Preceded by: Arthur D. Ganong
- Succeeded by: A. Wesley Stuart

Personal details
- Born: Burton Maxwell Hill; 21 June 1883 St. Stephen, New Brunswick
- Died: 7 January 1963 (aged 79)
- Party: Liberal
- Spouse(s): Leah Violet Beveridge m. 20 June 1911
- Profession: civil engineer

Burton Maxwell Hill (21 June 1883 – 7 January 1963) was a Liberal party member of the House of Commons of Canada. He was born in St. Stephen, New Brunswick, and became a civil engineer by career.

Hill attended school in St. Stephen then the University of New Brunswick where he received a Bachelor of Science for engineering. From 1918 to 1925, he was the New Brunswick provincial Deputy Minister of Public Works. In 1925, Hill became a full provincial minister of Public Works under Premier Peter Veniot, but resigned later that year after the government was defeated in an election where Hill did not win a seat.

In 1929 and 1930, he was commissioner for the Saint John Harbour Board.

He was first elected to Parliament at the Charlotte riding in the 1935 general election and re-elected there in 1940. After completing his second term, the 19th Canadian Parliament, Hill did not seek further re-election and left federal office at the 1945 election.

== Electoral history ==
1940 Canadian federal election: Charlotte
Party	Candidate	Votes	%	±%
Liberal	Burton M. Hill	6,099	58.1	+6.6
Conservative	Walter DeWolfe	4,391	41.9	+9.8
Total valid votes		10,490	100.0	

1935 Canadian federal election: Charlotte
Party	Candidate	Votes	%	±%
Liberal	Burton M. Hill	5,436	51.5	+9.3
Conservative	Chauncey Randall Pollard	3,386	32.1	-25.7
Reconstruction	Walter Quartermain	1,732	16.4	*
Total valid votes		10,554	100.0	
