= Richardson and Son Boat Building =

- Industry: Shipbuilding
- Founded: 1850s in Deer Island, Canada
- Founder: Thomas Richardson
- Number of employees: 5-6 (c. 1875)

Richardson and Son Boat Building was a historic shipbuilding company located on Deer Island, New Brunswick that spanned 4-5 generations of the Richardson family and was "the best known boat building firm in the Maritime Provinces for many decades".

== History ==
Formed in the 1850s by Thomas Richardson, the company built pinkies (a type of schooner) and other fishing boats, as well as yachts and pleasurecraft. It passed into the ownership of Thomas' son, George Everett Richardson, who oversaw the construction of more than a thousand ships. By 1875 it was noted Richardson & Son kept 5-6 steady jobs in their shipbuilding, and were noted for their 15' "net boats".

By 1908, it was remarked that in addition to building yachts, several tenders belonging to "famous yachts" had been built by Richardson and Son. By 1931, they were noted to have built a portion of Connors Brothers Limited's fishing fleet.

Falling under the leadership of George E. Richardson for more than forty years with a focus on the fishing fleet for Deer Island, in 1961 they built the yacht Ardesaand in 1962 the Lady K II, both of which continued in service through 1980.

== Legacy ==
In 1999, the former shipbuilding site was declared a provincial historic site, and is the only known surviving shipbuilding site from the 19th century.
