= Bumble Bee Foods =

American food production company

Bumble Bee Foods, LLC
- Type: Private
- Industry: Seafood
- Founded: 1899
- Headquarters: San Diego, California, U.S.
- Owner: FCF Co, Ltd.
- Website: www.bumblebee.com

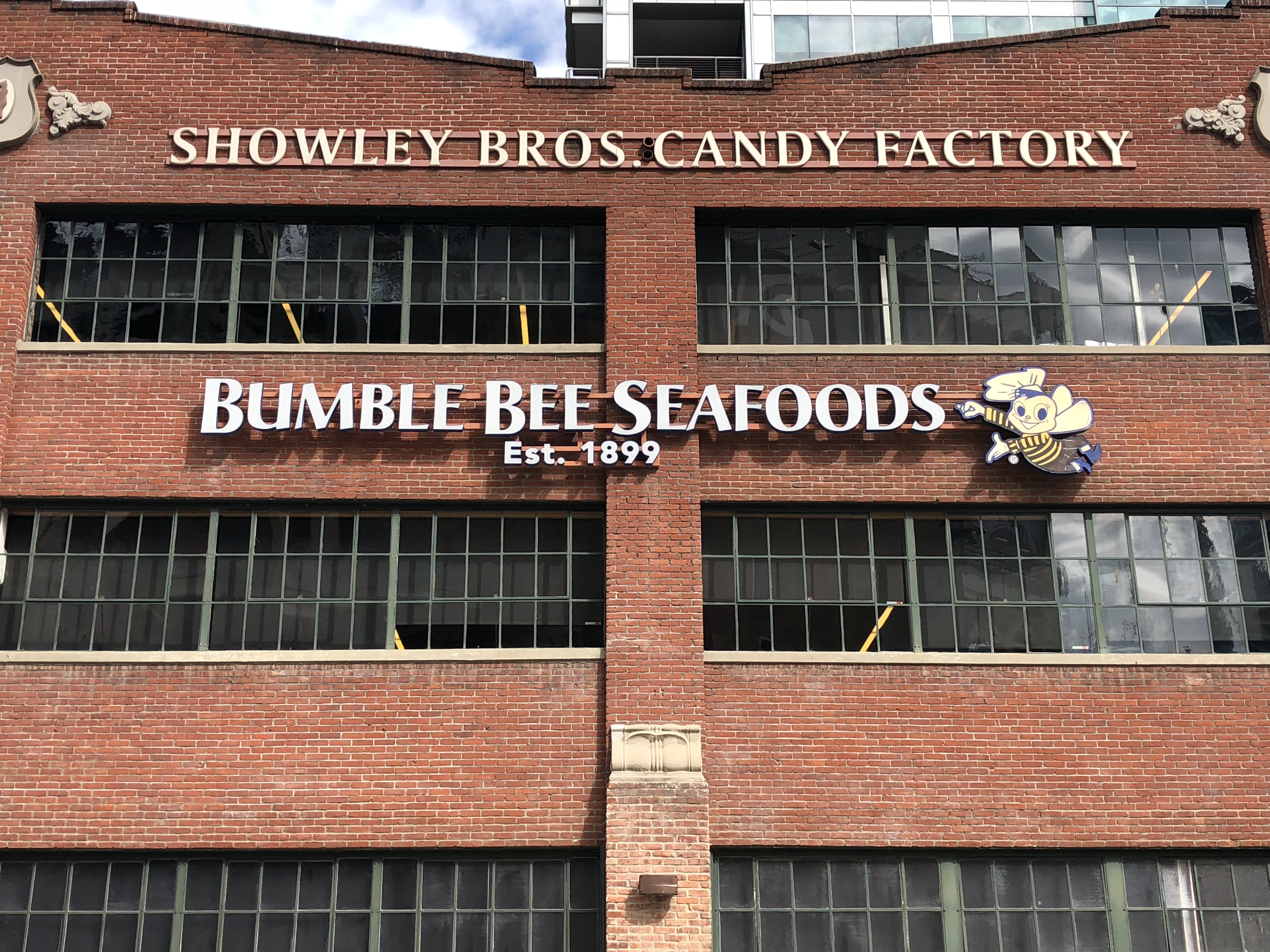
Bumble Bee Seafoods Building in San Diego's Petco Park

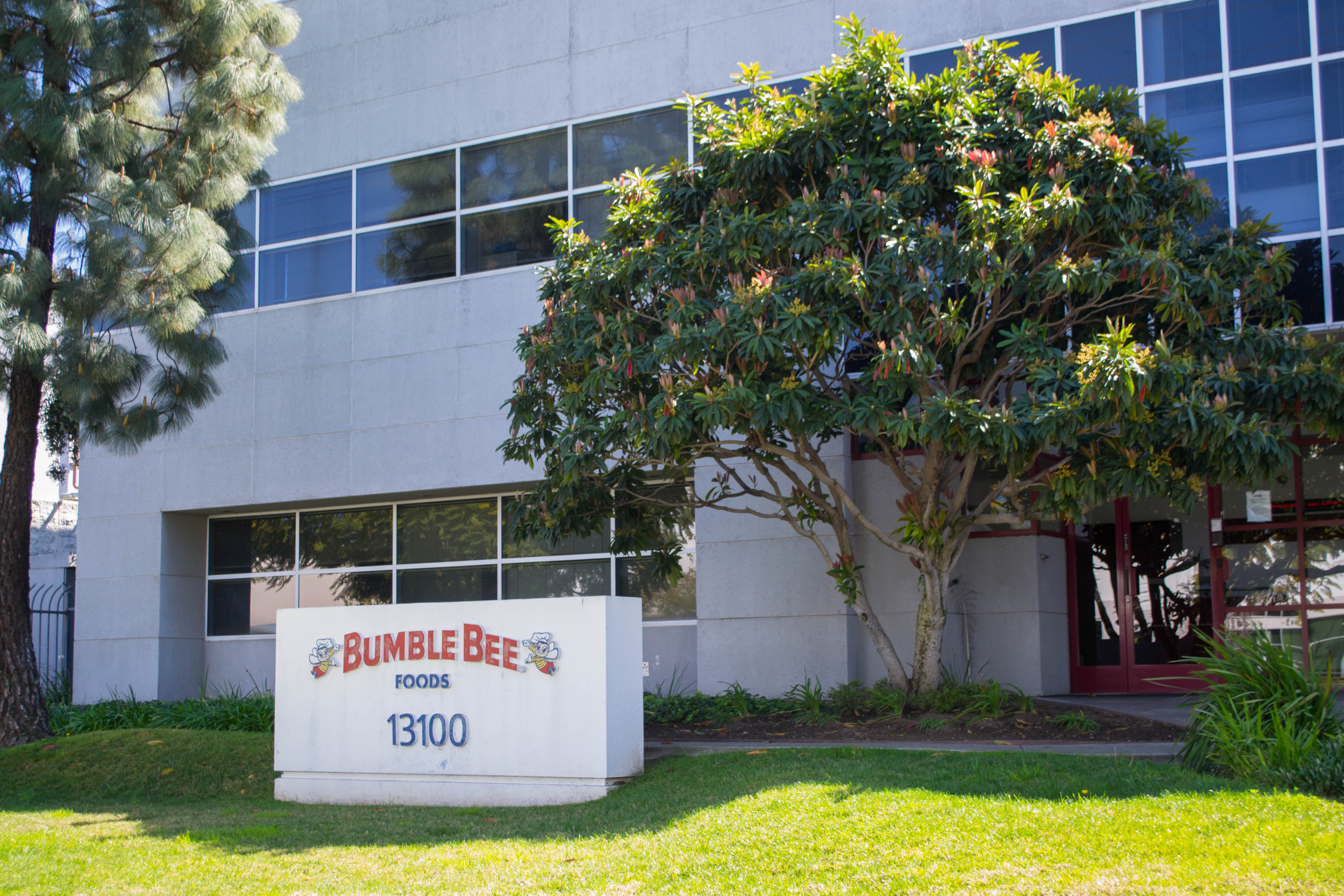
Bumble Bee Foods in Santa Fe Springs, California

Bumble Bee Foods, LLC, is an American company that produces canned tuna, salmon, other seafoods, and chicken under the brand names "Bumble Bee," "Wild Selections," "Beach Cliff," "Brunswick," and "Snow's." The brand is marketed as "Clover Leaf" in Canada. The company is headquartered in San Diego, California, United States. It is owned by FCF Co, Ltd. of Taiwan.

== History ==
The Bumble Bee company began in 1899 when seven salmon canners in Astoria, Oregon, formed the Columbia River Packers Association (CRPA) under the leadership of Andrew B. Hammond. The Bumble Bee brand was introduced in 1910. The CRPA incorporated in 1924, and in 1946, Transamerica acquired a controlling interest in CRPA, Inc. After partnering with Wards Cove Packing Company in 1959, CRPA became the world's largest salmon packer. In 1961, Castle & Cooke acquired CRPA by merger and changed the name of the company to Bumble Bee Seafoods after its most famous brand.

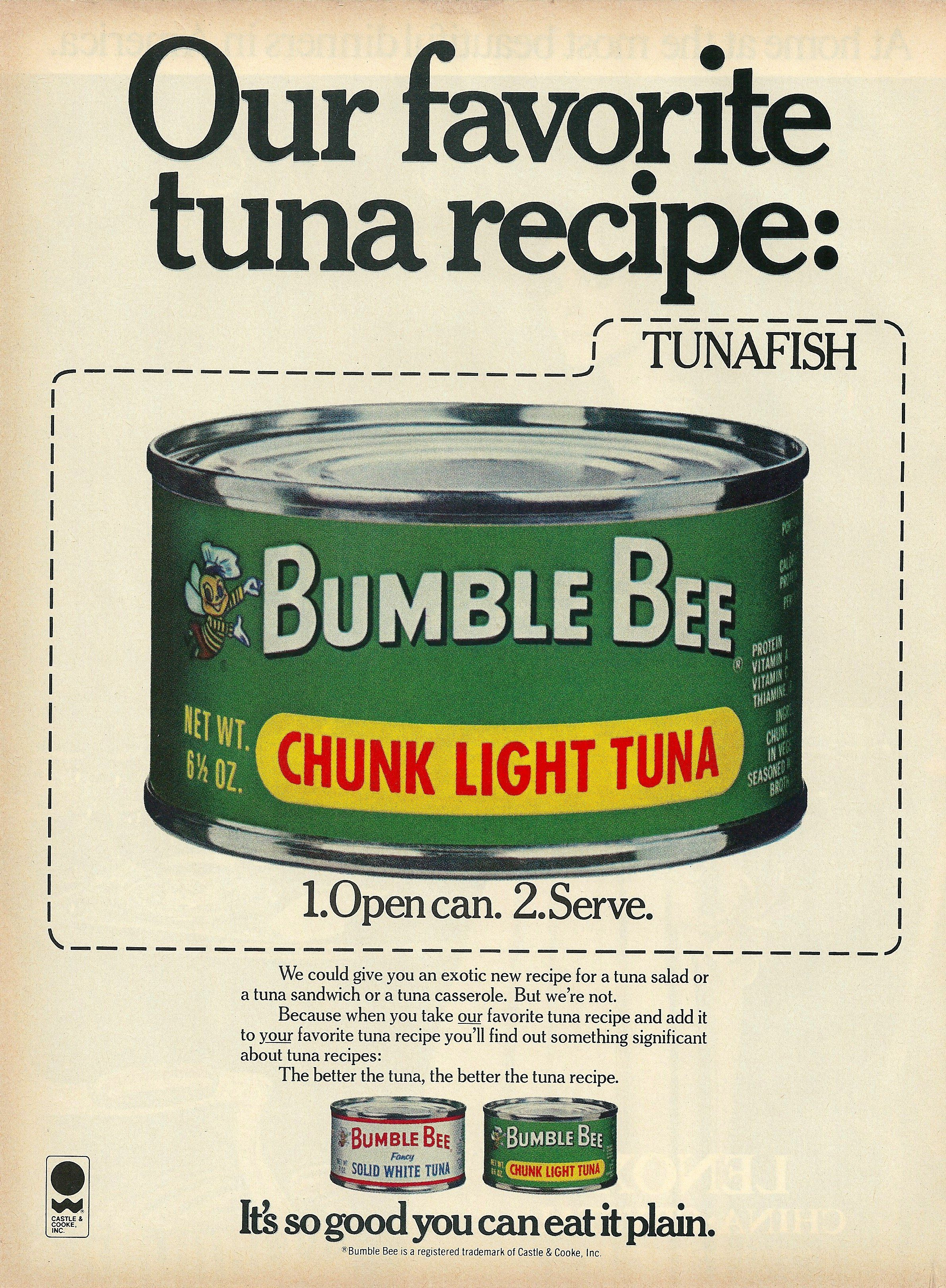
1977 magazine ad for Bumble Bee tuna.

Bumble Bee acquired parts of Westgate-California Corporation's tuna operations, based in San Diego, after the later company's collapse. Since the mid-1980s, Bumble Bee has undergone several ownership changes, beginning with Castle & Cooke's sale of Bumble Bee in a leveraged buyout to management in 1985. The management team, having paid off their leveraged debt before their 5-year goal, sold Bumble Bee to Pillsbury in 1988 contingent upon the president, Patrick Rose, and the management team staying on for five years, Pillsbury in turn, following its December 1988, hostile takeover by Grand Metropolitan PLC, was forced to sell the brand the following year to the Thai company Unicord. Bumble Bee went bankrupt in 1997, and was sold to International Home Foods, the former food unit of American Home Products. ConAgra Foods acquired International Home Foods in 2000; it sold Bumble Bee to the private equity firm Centre Partners in 2003. The Canadian company Connors Brothers Limited merged with Bumble Bee in 2004. The company was renamed Bumble Bee Foods, LLC in 2005. Centre Partners acquired the company again in 2008 and sold it to Lion Capital in 2010.

In August 2015, Bumble Bee Foods was sued, accused of colluding with Chicken of the Sea and StarKist to fix prices. Bumble Bee's former CEO, Christopher Lischewski, was indicted in May 2018 for price fixing. After pleading not guilty he was found guilty of conspiring to fix prices of cans of tuna sold in the US from November 2010 to December 2013.

In 2014, Puerto Rican celebrity chef, Doreen Colondres, became a brand ambassador for the company, hoping to appeal to Latin American audiences.

Bumble Bee Foods was in talks to merge with Chicken of the Sea, but the merger was called off on December 3, 2015, after the Department of Justice expressed "Serious Concerns" raised by Olean Wholesale Grocery, a regional wholesaler that had sued the two companies over alleged Sherman Antitrust Act violations.

=== Recalls ===
In 1982, 40 million cans of Bumble Bee tuna were recalled due to holes in some cans. In 2007, a case of botulism caused by food produced at a Castleberry's Food Company plant owned and operated by Bumble Bee prompted a recall. In 2010, the USDA announced a recall of Bumble Bee chicken salad products due to pieces of plastic found in packaging.

=== 2019 bankruptcy ===
On November 21, 2019, Bumble Bee Parent, Inc. and four affiliated companies filed for bankruptcy in the United States District Court for the District of Delaware. The company has filed a motion to approve the sale of the company's assets. FCF Co, Ltd. acquired Bumble Bee in March 2020 for $928 million.

== Lawsuits ==
=== Death of Jose Melena ===
On October 11, 2012, Jose Melena entered an industrial oven at the Santa Fe Springs, California, Bumble Bee plant, loading cans of tuna for sterilization. Unaware of Melena's presence in the oven, other workers loaded 12,000 pounds of tuna, trapping him inside. Over two hours, Melena was cooked to death and was only discovered by responding emergency services from Santa Fe Springs Fire Department. His death was described by Los Angeles Deputy District Attorney Hoon Chun as "the worst circumstances of death I have ever, ever witnessed," and that "I think any person would prefer to be, if they had to die some way, to be shot or stabbed."

In 2013, the company was fined nearly $74,000 and cited for six safety violations for the death and an additional $750,000 in fines, penalties and court costs in 2015. In April 2015, felony charges related to the accident were brought against the company, the director of plant operations, and the director of safety. The Los Angeles district attorney alleged that the accused willfully violated worker safety rules. To settle the criminal charges, Bumble Bee Foods agreed to pay $6 million, while two managers were to pay a total of $30,000 in fines.

=== 2025 forced labor lawsuit ===
In March 2025, lawyers representing four Indonesian fishermen filed a lawsuit against the company, accusing it of violating the Trafficking Victims Protection Act. The fishermen reported that they were beaten and trapped on vessels fishing for albacore tuna.

== Canneries ==
The company formerly ran a cannery in Astoria, Oregon, the Samuel Elmore Cannery, which had been designated a National Historic Landmark. The deteriorating structure was later slated for demolition, and the facility burned down in 1993. Today, the company has canneries in Santa Fe Springs, California.

== Advertisements ==
The brand is known for its "Yum Yum Bumble Bee" advertising, jingle originally penned by Callie Kocemba. The jingle was adapted into a song by the ska band Mephiskapheles on their 1994 record God Bless Satan. Horatio, a bee, is the mascot of the brand.

== See also ==
- Marshall J. Kinney Cannery
- Union Fishermen's Cooperative Packing Company Alderbrook Station
