= FCF Co., Ltd. =

Seafood company

FCF Co, Ltd.
- Company type: Privately held conglomerate
- Industry: Seafood
- Founded: 1972
- Headquarters: Kaohsiung, Taiwan
- Key people: Max Chou (President)
- Website: fcf.com.tw

FCF Co, Ltd. (FCF) is a privately held Taiwanese seafood conglomerate. They are one of the largest tuna traders in the world.

== Overview ==
FCF is one of the largest tuna traders in the world. They are privately held. They are one of the largest integrated marine industry supply-chain service providers. They have more than 30 subsidiaries. FCF is a member of the Western Pacific Sustainable Tuna Alliance.

== History ==
FCF was founded in 1972.

In 2019 FCF placed a stalking horse bid following the bankruptcy of Bumble Bee Foods, they already held a 25% stake in the company. In 2020 they successfully acquired Bumble Bee Foods.

A 2020 Greenpeace report linked FCF to illegal fishing and forced labor.

== Facilities ==
FCF owns processing plants in Ghana and Papua New Guinea. Their fishing bases are mostly in Pacific Island nations but they also have bases in Mauritius, Cape Town, South Africa, and Montevideo, Uruguay.

== Organization ==
FCF has seven main operational units:

- Information Technology and Administration
- Longline
- Squid
- Purse Seine
- Finance
- Compliance Customers Response Management (CCRM)
- Vessel Service and Governance Department (VSG)

== See also ==
- List of companies of Taiwan
- Maritime industries of Taiwan
- Bolton Group
- Itochu
- True World Foods
