= 8th Canadian Infantry Division =

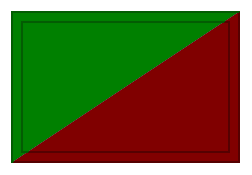
- Formation patch of the division.
- Active: 18 March 1942 – 15 October 1943
- Country: Canada
- Branch: Canadian Army
- Type: Infantry
- Role: Home defence
- Size: Division
- Part of: Pacific Command
- Garrison/HQ: Prince George, British Columbia
- Engagements: World War II: American theater

Commanders
- Notable commanders: Major-General Hardy N. Ganong

The 8th Canadian Infantry Division, also simply known as the 8th Canadian Division was a military formation of the Canadian Army that served within Pacific Command in Western Canada during World War II. The division's units were raised on 18 March 1942, and the headquarters was raised on 12 May 1942 at Prince George, British Columbia. The division was a home defence unit, initially consisting of the 19th, 20th, and 21st Canadian Infantry Brigades. In July the home defence divisions were reorganized, and the 8th Division consisted of the 14th and 16th Infantry Brigades. The 19th Brigade went to the 6th Canadian Infantry Division, the 20th went to the 7th Canadian Infantry Division, and the 21st remained at Valcartier Camp, Quebec, as a strategic reserve. The 8th Canadian Infantry Division was disbanded on 15 October 1943, along with the 16th Brigade. The 14th Brigade returned to the 6th Division.

Throughout its relatively brief existence, the division was commanded by Major-General Hardy N. Ganong.

== Order of battle ==
June 1942

- Headquarters, 8th Division
  - 8th Division Intelligence Section
  - No. 8 Field Security Section
  - No. 8 Defence and Employment Platoon (Lorne Scots)
- Machine Gun Battalion - 1st Battalion, The Prince of Wales Rangers (Peterborough Regiment)
- 19th Brigade
  - 3rd Battalion, Irish Fusiliers (Vancouver Regiment)
  - 1st Battalion, The Winnipeg Light Infantry
  - 1st Battalion, The Prince Albert Volunteers
  - No. 19 Defence Platoon
- 20th Brigade
  - 3rd Battalion, The Queen's Own Rifles of Canada
  - 3rd Battalion, The Royal Winnipeg Rifles
  - 1st Battalion, 2nd/10th Dragoons
  - No. 20 Defence Platoon
- 21st Brigade
  - 3rd Battalion, Les Fusiliers Mont-Royal
  - 3rd Battalion, Le Régiment de Maisonneuve
  - 1st Battalion, Le Régiment de Lévis
  - No. 21 Defence Platoon

Units of the supporting arms included:

- Royal Canadian Artillery:
  - Headquarters, Eighth Divisional Artillery, RCA
  - 25th Field Regiment
    - 114th Field Battery
    - 115th Field Battery
    - 116th Field Battery
  - 26th Field Regiment
    - 117th Field Battery
    - 118th Field Battery
    - 119th Field Battery
  - 27th Field Regiment
    - 120th Field Battery
    - 121st Field Battery
    - 122nd Field Battery
- Corps of Royal Canadian Engineers:
  - Headquarters 8th Divisional Engineers, RCE
    - 21st Field Company, RCE
    - 24th Field Company, RCE
- Royal Canadian Corps of Signals:
  - Headquarters 8th Divisional Signals RCCS
- Canadian Provost Corps:
  - Provost Company

Plus units of the RCASC, RCAMC, RCOC, CPC, etc.
