= Caldwell Stewart =

Canadian politician

Robert Dugald Caldwell Stewart

Member of Parliament for Charlotte
- In office March 1958 – June 1962

Personal details
- Born: 2 December 1907 Dalhousie, New Brunswick, Canada
- Died: 25 August 1967 (aged 59)
- Party: Progressive Conservative; Conservative
- Profession: lawyer

Robert Dugald Caldwell Stewart (2 December 1907 – 25 August 1967) was a Progressive Conservative party member of the House of Commons of Canada. He was born in Dalhousie, New Brunswick and became a lawyer by career.

He was first elected at the Charlotte riding in the 1958 general election. Stewart served for one term, the 24th Canadian Parliament, then was defeated at Charlotte in the 1962 election. He was also unsuccessful in regaining the riding in the 1965 election.

Stewart first campaigned for federal office in the 1935 election at Nova Scotia's Digby—Annapolis—Kings riding for the Conservative Party.

1965 Canadian federal election: Charlotte
Party	Candidate	Votes	%	±%
Liberal	Allan McLean	6,279	50.8	-2.2
Progressive Conservative	Caldwell Stewart	5,226	45.2	+0.6
New Democratic	George Cogswell	462	4.0	+3.0
Total valid votes		11,967	100.0	

1962 Canadian federal election: Charlotte
Party	Candidate	Votes	%	±%
Liberal	Allan McLean	6,159	51.0	+3.6
Progressive Conservative	Caldwell Stewart	5,518	45.7	-6.9
New Democratic	Robert Bontaine	396	3.3	*
Total valid votes		12,073	100.0	

1958 Canadian federal election: Charlotte
Party	Candidate	Votes	%	±%
Progressive Conservative	Caldwell Stewart	5,756	52.6	+5.2
Liberal	Wesley Stuart	5,806	47.4	-5.2
Total valid votes		11,562	100.0	
