= Allan M.A. McLean =

Canadian politician

A. M. A. McLean
- Official 1966 portrait

Member of Parliament for Charlotte
- In office June 18, 1962 – June 24, 1968
- Preceded by: Caldwell Stewart
- Succeeded by: Riding dissolved

Personal details
- Born: Allan Marcus Atkinson McLean; September 27, 1891 Bristol, New Brunswick, Canada
- Died: April 27, 1969 (aged 77) Miami, Florida, U.S.
- Party: Liberal
- Spouse: Mary Margaret Foley (d.1967)
- Children: 3
- Relatives: A. Neil McLean (brother); Donald McLean (cousin)
- Profession: Manufacturer; Industrialist

Allan Marcus Atkinson McLean (September 27, 1891 – April 27, 1969) was a Canadian businessman who co-managed Connors Brothers Limited, a New Brunswick based fish processing business, and a politician who served as a member of the House of Commons of Canada.

== Biography ==
Born in Bristol, New Brunswick, the third of four children, he is a descendant of Dutch United Empire Loyalists on his mother's side, and Scots émigrés to Cape Breton Island on his father's side. In 1923, McLean, along with elder brother Neil, took control of the Connors Bros. fish processing business that had been founded in Blacks Harbour, New Brunswick by Lewis and Patrick Connors in 1894.

Much of the McLean brothers' lives were spent developing the fishing industry centered around New Brunswick's Passamaquoddy Bay in southwestern New Brunswick. Largely focused on canning herring, Connors Brothers also served the northeastern United States' Roman Catholic 'fish on Friday' market by shipping haddock and pollock to New England markets. Connors Brothers was sold to the George Weston Limited conglomerate headquartered in Toronto in approximately 1966 as Neil and Allan McLean approached 80 years of age.

Both McLean brothers were active in politics. Neil McLean (1885–1967) served as president of the New Brunswick Liberal Party for many years and then as a member of the Senate of Canada. Allan McLean ran for election to the House of Commons of Canada in 1961 in the riding of Charlotte County, New Brunswick, was elected and re-elected twice until retiring in 1968. He died of a heart attack in Florida in 1969.
