= Lorne B. Groom =

Canadian politician

Lorne B. Groom (May 13, 1919 – July 24, 1994) was an optometrist and political figure in New Brunswick, Canada. He represented Charlotte County in the Legislative Assembly of New Brunswick from 1952 to 1957 as a Progressive Conservative member.

He was born in Bocabec, Charlotte County, New Brunswick, the son of J. M. Groom. During World War II, he served overseas with the Canadian Army, Carleton and York Regiment, rising to the rank of lieutenant. Groom lost both legs during the war. At home, he served as president of the St. Croix Branch of the Canadian Legion.

In 1946, Lorne Groom married Ruth Lucille Lindsay. They made their home in St. Stephen where he was a practising optometrist.

In the June 10, 1957 Canadian federal election, Groom ran unsuccessfully for a seat in the House of Commons. The Progressive Conservative Party of Canada candidate in the riding of New Brunswick Southwest, he lost to incumbent Wesley Stuart.

Lorne Groom died in 1994 and is buried in the St. Stephen Rural Cemetery.

1957 Canadian federal election: Charlotte
Party	Candidate	Votes	%	±%
Liberal	Wesley Stuart	6,393	52.6	+0.2
Progressive Conservative	Lorne B. Groom	5,756	47.4	+3.3
Total valid votes		12,149	100.0	

== See also ==
- List of people with surname Groom

Legislative Assembly of New Brunswick
Preceded by Hugh S. Balkam	MLA for Charlotte County; 1952-1957	Succeeded by Kenneth J. Webber
