= Clover Leaf Seafoods =

Canadian canned seafood marketing company

Clover Leaf Seafoods Company
- Company type: Subsidiary
- Industry: Seafood
- Headquarters: Markham, Ontario, Canada
- Brands: Clover Leaf; Brunswick
- Parent: Connors Brothers Limited
- Website: cloverleaf.ca

Clover Leaf Seafoods Company is the leading marketer brand of canned seafood in the Canadian market owned by British equity firm Lion Capital LLP. Headquartered in Markham, Ontario, it sells canned, shelf-stable, and frozen goods under the Clover Leaf and Brunswick brands. The company's products include tuna, salmon, oysters, mussels, clams, shrimp, crab, lobster and sardines. Clover Leaf Seafoods was formerly owned by Canadian Connors Brothers Limited when merged with American counterpart brand Bumble Bee Seafoods in 2003, it was then sold to American equity firm Centre Partners (based in Los Angeles) in 2005, then sold to Lion Capital (based in London) in 2010. In 2020, FCF Co, Ltd. (FCF), a privately held Taiwanese seafood conglomerate and an industry leader in sustainability and traceability, purchased Bumble Bee to become one of the world’s largest seafood companies.

The Clover Leaf brand has been used to market canned seafood products in Canada since 1889 when it was introduced by the Anglo-American Packing Company.

== History ==
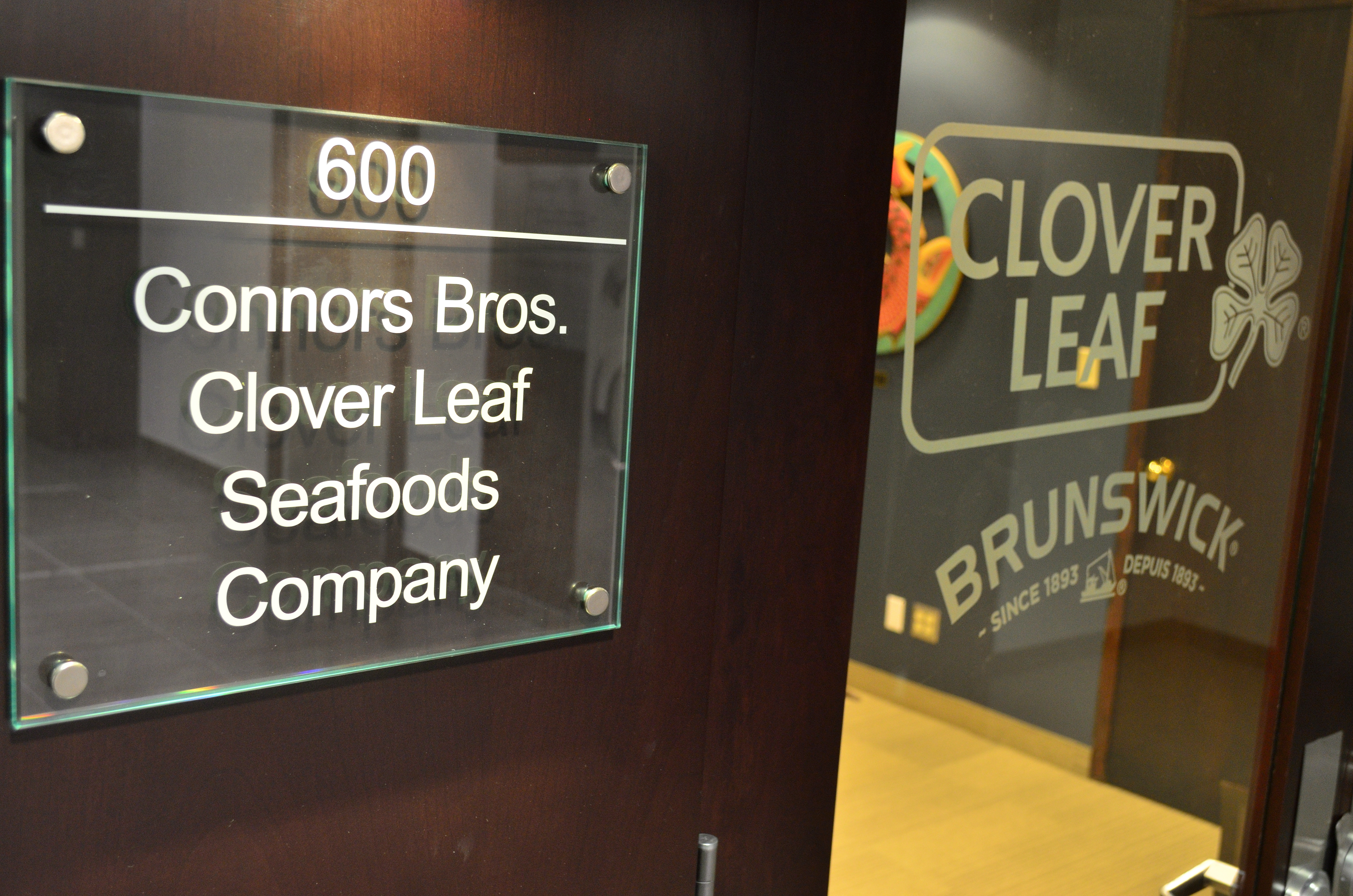
Clover Leaf Seafoods office in Markham

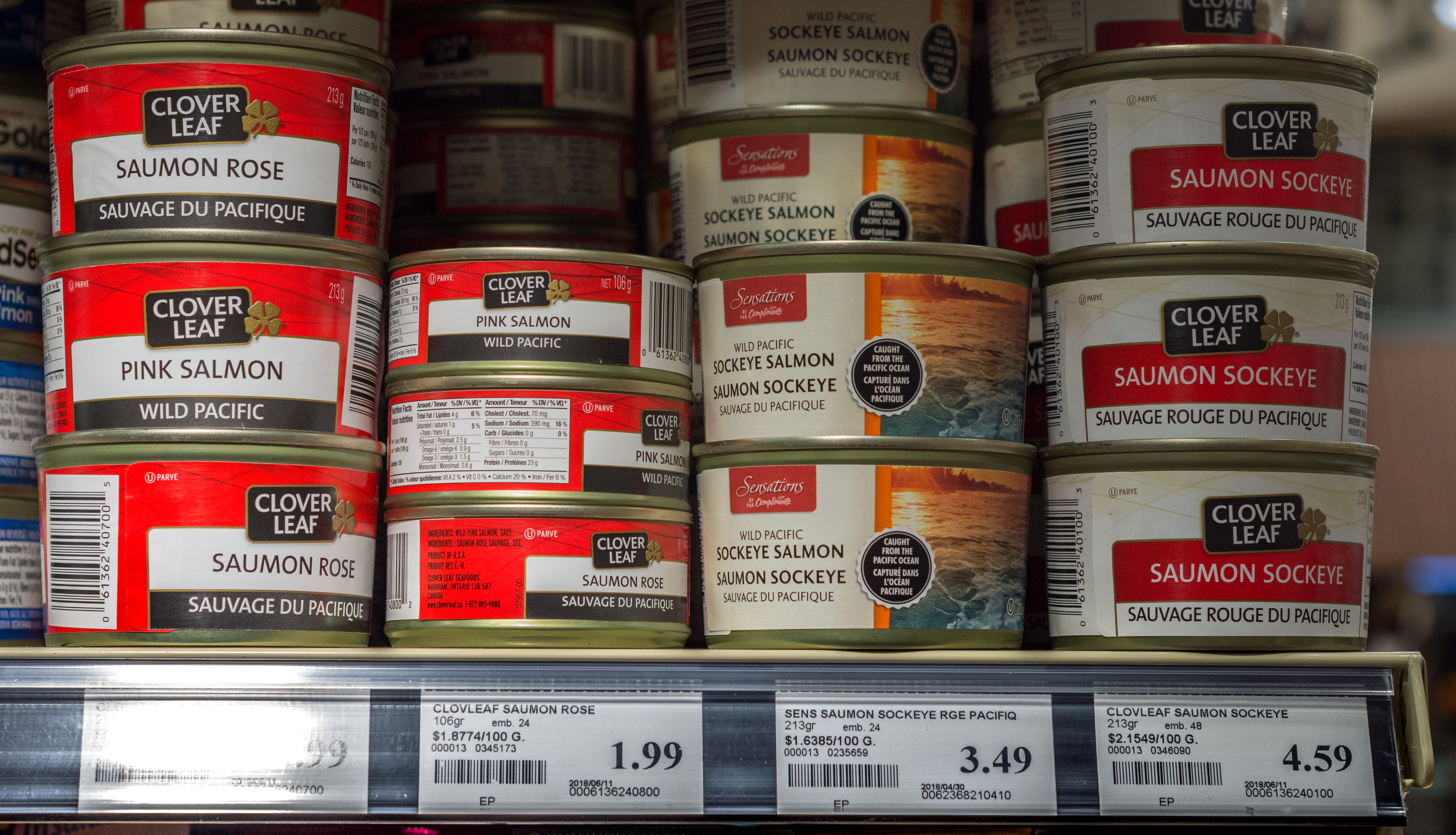
Clover Leaf Seafoods products

Clover Leaf Seafoods traces its roots back to 1871 when Alexander Ewen and three partners founded Loggie & Company, the first commercial salmon cannery in British Columbia, Canada. The cannery was located on the south shore of the Fraser River opposite New Westminster on a site that's now part of North Delta (founded as Annieville).

In 1902, Loggie & Company merged with some of its local competitors to form the British Columbia Packers' Association, which was chartered as a New Jersey–based entity to take advantage of the state's favourable trust laws. Ewen emerged as the company's largest shareholder and first president.

In 1908, a year after Ewen's death at age 74, the company purchased the Clover Leaf brand and began selling its canned salmon under the newly acquired trademark. Clover Leaf had been introduced in Canada in 1889 by the Anglo-American Packing Company to sell canned mackerel, among other products.

In 1928, the British Columbia Packers' Association merged with Gosse Packing Company Ltd. and was federally incorporated in Canada as British Columbia Packers Limited (BC Packers). The consolidated entity consisted of 44 canneries, three cold storage facilities, five plants and shipyards, two salteries and more than 100 fishing boats, packers and coastal tenders.

Up until 1945, BC Packer's fishery operations were focused on the British Columbia Coast. Post World War II, the company expanded rapidly, opening new Canadian facilities in Ontario and Atlantic Canada and foreign facilities in coastal areas of the United States, Mexico and Southeast Asia.

In 1962, George Weston Limited acquired BC Packers and its Clover Leaf brand. Five years later, in 1967, it also acquired Connors Bros., makers of Brunswick Sardines and Seafood Snacks.

The end of the 20th century and the first decade of the new millennium brought a number of ownership changes for Clover Leaf. In 1998, George Weston sold the Clover Leaf brand and associated trademarks to International Home Foods, which established Clover Leaf Seafoods as a separate legal entity. Shortly thereafter, International Home Foods rolled Clover Leaf into its U.S. canned seafood division, Bumble Bee.

Subsequently, in 2001, ConAgra purchased International Home Foods, acquiring the Clover Leaf/Bumble Bee seafood division as part of the transaction. In 2003, ConAgra sold the division to a senior management group. A year later, Clover Leaf/Bumble Bee merged with Connors Bros. to create Connors Bros. Income Fund, North America's largest branded-seafood company.

In 2008, Connors Bros. was acquired by U.S. private equity firm Centre Partners. In 2010, Centre Partners sold Connors Bros. to British private-equity firm Lion Capital LLP.

In 2020, FCF Co, Ltd. (FCF), a privately held Taiwanese seafood conglomerate, purchased Bumble Bee.

== See also ==
- List of seafood companies
