= William Frederick Todd =

Canadian politician

The Honourable William Frederick Todd
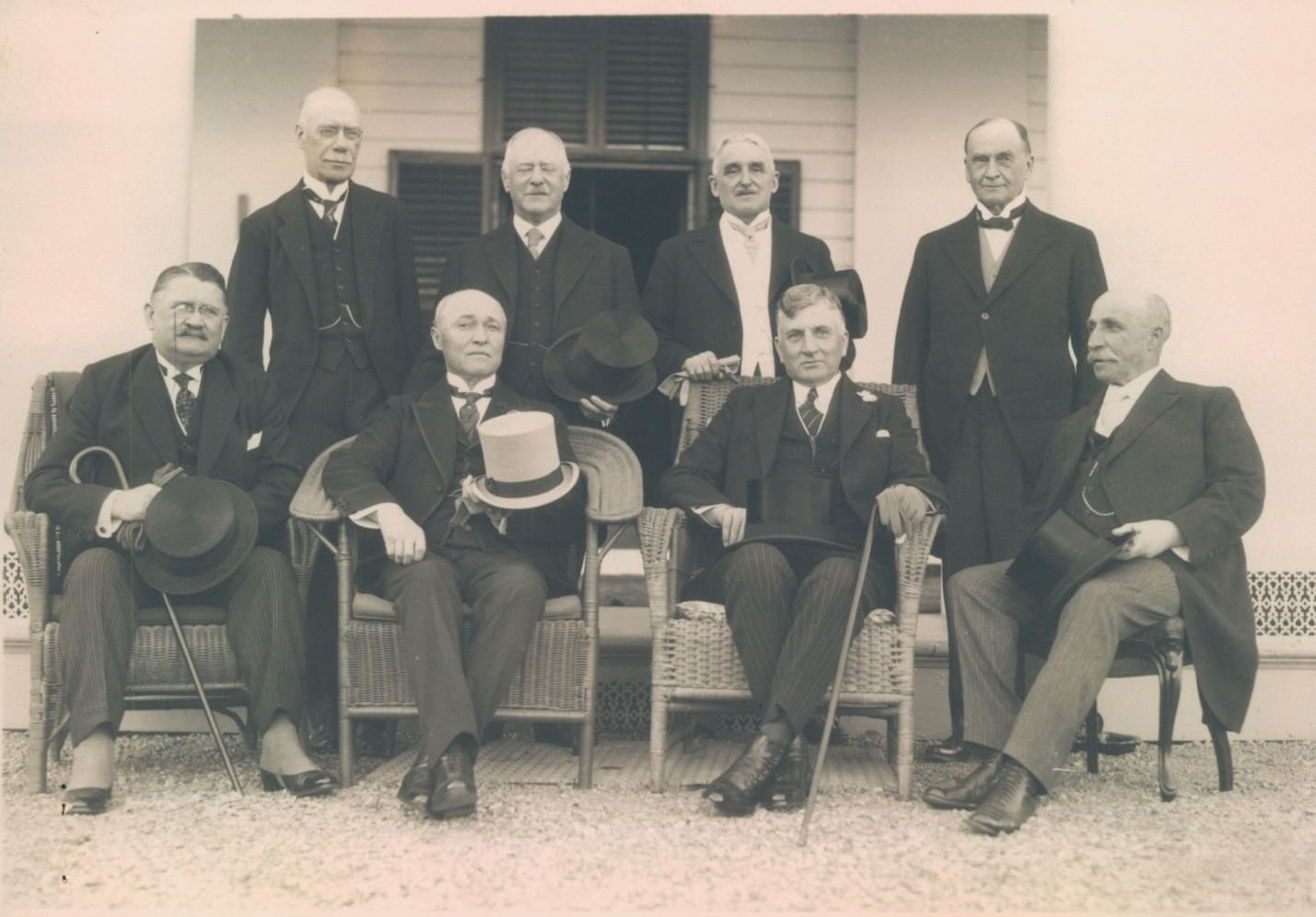
- William Frederick Todd, seated far right.

16th Lieutenant Governor of New Brunswick
- In office 28 February 1923 – 28 December 1928
- Monarch: George V
- Governors General: The Viscount Byng of Vimy; The Viscount Willingdon
- Premier: Peter J. Veniot; John B. M. Baxter
- Preceded by: William Pugsley
- Succeeded by: Hugh Havelock McLean

Personal details
- Born: 2 May 1854 St. Stephen, New Brunswick, Canada
- Died: 16 March 1935 (aged 80) St. Stephen, New Brunswick, Canada
- Party: Liberal
- Spouse: Ethel J. Bolton
- Parents: Freeman H. Todd (father); Adeline Boardman (mother)
- Occupation: Farmer, lumber merchant, manufacturer, rancher, shipper, wholesaler, politician

William Frederick Todd (2 May 1854 – 16 March 1935) was a businessman and political figure in New Brunswick. He represented Charlotte County in the Legislative Assembly of New Brunswick from 1899 to 1903 and Charlotte in the House of Commons of Canada from 1908 to 1911 as a Liberal member. Todd served as the 16th Lieutenant Governor of New Brunswick from 28 February 1923, to 27 December 1928.

He was born in St. Stephen, New Brunswick, the youngest son of Freeman H. Todd and Adeline Boardman. His father was a very successful lumber merchant and president of the St. Croix Soap Manufacturing Company. In 1879, William Todd married Ethel J. Bolton, the daughter of John Bolton. Todd was unsuccessful in bids for reelection in 1911, 1917, and 1921.

He died of a heart attack in 1935, while visiting a lawyer's office. He was the age of 80.

== Electoral history ==
1921 Canadian federal election: Charlotte
Party	Candidate	Votes	%	±%
Conservative	Robert Watson Grimmer	5,202	50.6	-4.6
Liberal	William Frederick Todd	5,069	49.4	+4.6
Total valid votes		10,271	100.0	

1917 Canadian federal election: Charlotte
Party	Candidate	Votes	%	±%
Government (Unionist)	Thomas Aaron Hartt	3,248	55.2	+3.2
Opposition (Laurier Liberals)	William Frederick Todd	2,489	44.8	-3.3
Total valid votes		5,737	100.0	

1911 Canadian federal election: Charlotte
Party	Candidate	Votes	%	±%
Conservative	Thomas Aaron Hartt	2,685	51.9	+3.8
Liberal	William Frederick Todd	2,489	48.1	-3.9
Total valid votes		5,174	100.0	

1908 Canadian federal election: Charlotte
Party	Candidate	Votes	%	±%
Liberal	William Frederick Todd	2,691	51.9	+4.5
Conservative	Gilbert White Ganong	2,491	48.1	-4.5
Total valid votes		5,182	100.0	

Parliament of Canada
Preceded by Gilbert Ganong	Charlotte; 1908-1911	Succeeded by Thomas Aaron Hartt
