= Alexander Neil McLean =

Canadian politician

Alexander Neil McLean (November 12, 1885 – March 12, 1967) was a Canadian businessman and an appointee to the Senate of Canada.

Born in Hartland, New Brunswick, he was known as Neil. Along with his brother, Allan, in 1923 he and a group of investors took control of Connors Brothers Limited, a large fish processing business based in Blacks Harbour, New Brunswick. As president of the company, Neil McLean built the business into the world's largest producer of canned sardines.

In 1945, Canadian prime minister Mackenzie King appointed Neil McLean to the Senate for the Southern New Brunswick division. He served until his death in 1967.
