= W.C.H. Grimmer =

Canadian politician

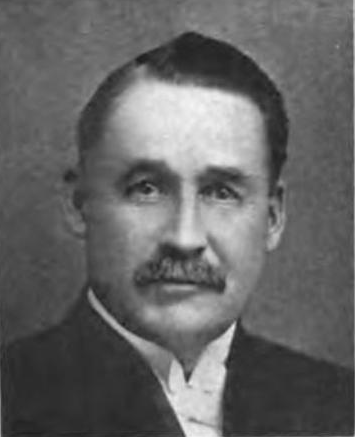

Member of the Legislative Assembly of New Brunswick
- In office 1903–1917
- Constituency: Charlotte County

Personal details
- Born: Ward Chipman Hazen Grimmer; October 31, 1858; St. Stephen, New Brunswick
- Died: October 3, 1945 (aged 86); Saint John, New Brunswick
- Spouse: Bessie E. Gove (m. 1884)
- Occupation: Lawyer, politician

Ward Chipman Hazen Grimmer (October 31, 1858 – October 3, 1945) was a lawyer and political figure in New Brunswick, Canada. He represented Charlotte County in the Legislative Assembly of New Brunswick from 1903 to 1917.

== Biography ==
He was born in St. Stephen, New Brunswick, the son of George S. Grimmer and his wife Mary A. Hazen, and was educated at the University of New Brunswick. In 1884, he married Bessie E. Gove.

Grimmer ran unsuccessfully for a seat in the provincial assembly in 1899 but was elected in 1903, serving until 1917. He was appointed to the province's Executive Council, serving as Surveyor General from 1908 to 1911 and as Attorney General from 1911 to 1914. Grimmer also served as mayor for St. Stephen and warden for Charlotte County.

He died in Saint John on October 3, 1945.

== Notes ==
New Brunswick provincial government of James Kidd Flemming
Cabinet posts (2)
Predecessor	Office	Successor
John D. Hazen	'Attorney General of New Brunswick'; 1911-1914	George J. Clarke
Francis J. Sweeney	'Surveyor General'; 1908-1911	James K. Flemming
