= Walter Brittain Dickson =

Speaker of the Legislative Assembly of New Brunswick
- In office February 26, 1914 – 1915
- Preceded by: George Johnson Clarke
- Succeeded by: Olivier-Maximin Melanson

Member of the Legislative Assembly of New Brunswick
- In office 1908–1916
- Constituency: Albert

Personal details
- Born: December 26, 1847 Saint John, New Brunswick, Canada
- Died: January 23, 1916 (aged 68) Moncton, New Brunswick, Canada

Walter Brittain Dickson (December 26, 1847 – January 23, 1916) was a Canadian politician who served as a member of the Legislative Assembly of New Brunswick for Albert and as Speaker of the Legislative Assembly.
