= James Davies Lewin =

Canadian politician (1812–1900)

The Hon. James Davies Lewin
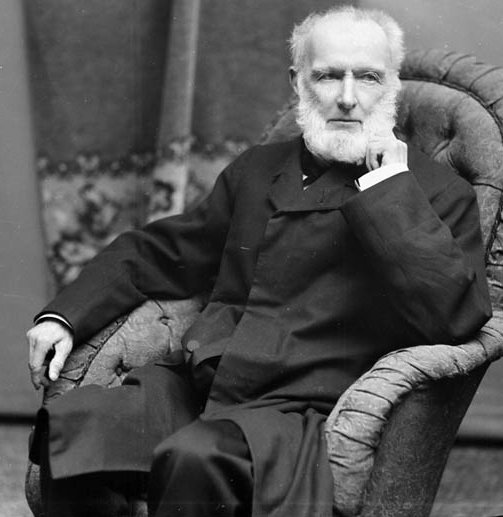

Senator for St. John (Lancaster), New Brunswick
- In office November 10, 1876 – March 11, 1900
- Appointed by: Alexander Mackenzie

Personal details
- Born: April 1, 1812 Womaston, Radnorshire (now Powys), Wales
- Died: March 11, 1900 (aged 87) Lancaster (Saint John West), New Brunswick
- Party: Liberal

James Davies Lewin (April 1, 1812 – March 11, 1900) was a Canadian office holder, businessman, and politician.

== Background ==
Born in Womaston, Radnorshire (now Powys), Wales, the son of Samuel Lewin and Mary Furmage, Lewin was educated at the Kingston Grammar School, Wales.

== Career ==
He entered the British government service in 1830 and assigned to the customs department on the Miramichi River, New Brunswick. He continued in the office for twenty years. In 1855, he was elected to the Presidency of the Bank of New Brunswick, and held this position until his death. He was appointed to the Senate on the advice of Alexander Mackenzie on November 10, 1876, representing the senatorial division of St. John (Lancaster), New Brunswick. A Liberal, he served for 23 years until his death in 1900.

== Family life ==
He was married in 1832 to Sarah Ann Clarke, they had at least seven children.
