= John Bolton (Canadian politician) =

Canadian politician

John Bolton (November 18, 1824 – July 14, 1872) was a New Brunswick businessman and political figure. He represented Charlotte in the 1st Canadian Parliament as a Liberal member.

He was born in England in 1824 and educated there. He was a merchant at Saint Stephen, New Brunswick. In 1858, he married a Miss Christiana Hezediah Upton. His sister Kate married Benjamin Robert Stephenson who represented Charlotte in the Legislative Assembly of New Brunswick. Bolton died at Saint Stephen in 1872.

His daughter Ethel married William Frederick Todd, who served in the provincial assembly and the House of Commons and went on to become Lieutenant Governor for the province.

1867 Canadian federal election: Charlotte
Party	Candidate	Votes	%
Liberal	John Bolton	1,061	56.9
Unknown	Robert Thompson	671	43.1
Total valid votes		1,732	100.0
Source: Canadian Elections Database
