= Peter McSweeney =

Canadian politician (1842–1921)

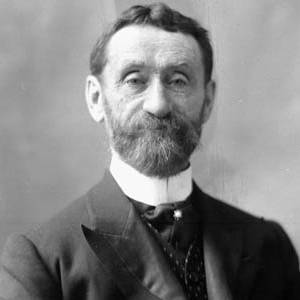
Peter McSweeney Source: Library and Archives Canada

Peter McSweeney (April 9, 1842 – February 2, 1921) was a merchant and political figure in New Brunswick, Canada. He sat for Northumberland division in the Senate of Canada from 1899 to 1921 as a Liberal.

He was born in Moncton, New Brunswick, the son of Peter McSweeney, an Irish immigrant, and Joanna Downing. He first went into business with his brothers, Edward and Thomas, who dealt in dry goods and furniture. In 1872, he married Wilhelmina Smith, the widow of H. Peter Fisher. McSweeney went into business on his own in 1877. He also served on Moncton town council.
