= Margot Grimmer =

Margot Grimmer (born 1944) rose to prominence as a dancer in several companies, including the Lyric Opera Ballet, the Ruth Page International Ballet, the New York City Ballet, and the Ballet Russe de Monte Carlo. She studied ballet as a child in Chicago, and was among 50 from 3,000 applicants selected for the children’s ensemble of the New York City Ballet’s Chicago production of George Balanchine’s Nutcracker at the Opera House. At age 14, she danced professionally in Broadway musicals at the Kansas City Starlight Theatre and continued at the St. Louis Municipal Theatre and Music Theater in Highland Park. After high school, Grimmer’s career flourished. In 1962, she appeared with Ruth Page’s Chicago Opera Ballet in the American debut of Russian defector superstar Rudolf Nureyev at the Brooklyn Academy of Music. In 1965, she danced a principal role in the Lyric Opera of Chicago’s production of Carmina Burana at the Opera House. From 1965-1968, she performed in the International Ballet’s Nutcracker, starring Erik Bruhn, Carla Fracci, Henning Kronstam and Kirsten Simone, at McCormick Place and the Opera House. From 1965-1968, she gave lecture-demonstration performances in ballet and modern dance, under a federal grant from the National Endowment for Arts, for the War On Poverty’s Cultural Enrichment program in Chicago’s inner city schools. In 1967, she was featured in the experimental dance movie Statics, which won awards in cinematography and art direction at International Film Festivals. On off-seasons, she attended Northwestern University, majoring in acting and English Literature.

In 1970, Grimmer became director of the Eric Braun School of Dance in Highland Park after the American Ballet Theatre star’s untimely death. She began teaching, inspiring and mentoring young dancers. In 1972, she founded the American Dance Company after receiving standing ovations and critical acclaim at the Chicago premiere of her rock ballet In-A-Gadda-Da-Vida. The Company presented original ballets, many of them recipients of grants from the Illinois Arts Council and the National Endowment for Arts. Grimmer became well known for her commitment toward creating progressive ballets, choosing to choreograph multimedia presentations, blending the precision of classical ballet with the earthiness of modern dance and the theatrical flash of jazz. She appeared on Chicago Ballet Guild Choreographers’ Showcase performances throughout Illinois from 1972-1975, at the Ravinia Festival in 1973, with the Chicago Symphony Orchestra in 1974, on the Bob Hope Show at the Milwaukee Auditorium in 1975, at the Kennedy Center in 1976, on the Weinstein Center for Performing Arts concert series from 1975-1987 and at the Chicago Daley Center and Cultural Center from 1978-1987.

She is listed in the Who’s Who of American Women, the International Who’s Who of Intellectuals and Who’s Who in America. Photos and memorabilia of her career are included in the Ann Barzel Dance Archives of the Newberry Library in Chicago. Her dance career memoir, An American Dance Story, was published in 2020.
