= Saint Croix Courier =

Canadian newspaper in New Brunswick

- Type: Weekly newspaper
- Format: Tabloid
- Owner: CHCO-TV
- Founder: David Main
- Founded: October 1865; 160 years ago
- Language: English
- Headquarters: 47 Milltown Blv; St. Stephen, New Brunswick E3L 1G4
- Country: Canada
- Website: stcroixcourier.ca

The Saint Croix Courier is a weekly newspaper published Tuesdays in St. Stephen, New Brunswick, Canada. On the St. Croix River, the newspaper covers Charlotte County, New Brunswick and Washington County, Maine.

== History ==
The Saint Croix Courier first published on Oct. 14, 1865 as a pro-confederation newspaper. It was founded by David Main and purchased by Stanley Granville in 1920. Richard A. Granville put the paper up for sale in 1986. Advocate Media came to own and operate the paper in 2002. The company paused publication in May 2024 while it looked for a buyer. After several months it was sold to CHCO-TV, who first relaunched the paper online and then returned to print in June 2025 as a free, monthly publication.
