= Thomas Aaron Hartt =

Canadian politician

Thomas Aaron Hartt (October 31, 1858 – July 13, 1930) was a farmer, merchant and political figure in New Brunswick, Canada. He represented Charlotte County in the Legislative Assembly of New Brunswick from 1903 to 1911 and Charlotte in the House of Commons of Canada from 1911 to 1921 as a Conservative and then Unionist member.

He was born in Hartt's Mills, New Brunswick, the son of Aaron Hartt and Mary J. Alexander. He was educated at the normal school in Fredericton and at a business college in Saint John. He taught school for a time. In 1881, he married Maud A. Greenlaw. He ran unsuccessfully for a seat in the provincial assembly in 1899. Hartt resigned his seat in the provincial assembly in 1911 to run for a seat in the House of Commons. He did not run for reelection in 1921.

== Electoral history ==
1917 Canadian federal election: Charlotte
Party	Candidate	Votes	%	±%
Government (Unionist)	Thomas Aaron Hartt	3,248	55.2	+3.2
Opposition (Laurier Liberals)	William Frederick Todd	2,489	44.8	-3.3
Total valid votes		5,737	100.0	

1911 Canadian federal election: Charlotte
Party	Candidate	Votes	%	±%
Conservative	Thomas Aaron Hartt	2,685	51.9	+3.8
Liberal	William Frederick Todd	2,489	48.1	-3.9
Total valid votes		5,174	100.0	

Parliament of Canada
Preceded by William Frederick Todd	Charlotte; 1911-1921	Succeeded by Robert Watson Grimmer
