= Connors Brothers Limited =

Canadian fish packing company

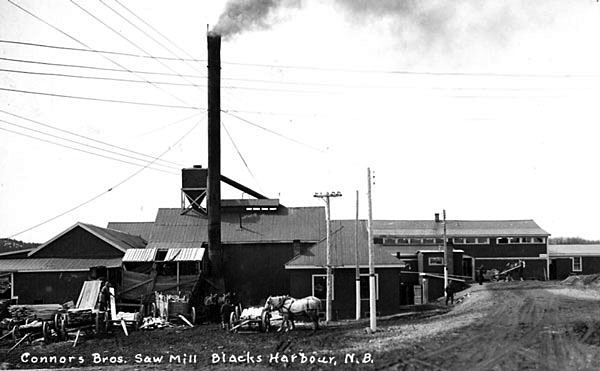
1930 photograph of Connors Brothers sawmill in Blacks Harbour

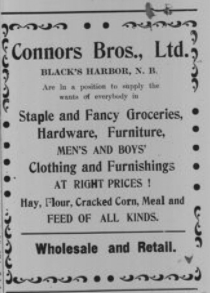
1910 signage for the company store.

Connors Brothers Limited was a fish packing company founded by Lewis and Patrick Connors in the 1880s and based in Blacks Harbour, New Brunswick. It is known by the Brunswick brand, and is the only remaining producer of sardines in North America. Brunswick claims to be the largest sardine producer in the world. In addition to its own labels, it also packages for No Name, President's Choice and Co-Op food labels.

The brothers were both illiterate, and their first boat was the Happy Home; lacking ice for refrigeration they instead sold hacked and salted fish caught off the Wolf Islands.

In 1923, the company was purchased by Allan M.A. McLean and his brother Alexander Neil McLean. Allan would go on to become a Member of Parliament, while Neil was appointed to the Senate. Charlotte County's politics were always sharply divided, as Connors Brothers and its employees overwhelmingly supported the Liberal Party's protectionism to keep fish from being sold to US merchants at a higher price, while Ganong Chocolates and its employees overwhelmingly supported the Conservative Party's free trade as it brought low-cost sugar by rail through Maine cheaper than from further away in Canada.

As of 1931, it was noted a portion of Connors' fleet was built by Richardson and Son Boat Building on Deer Island.

Connors Brothers was purchased by George Weston Limited in 1967, and merged with BC Packers (Clover Leaf Seafood brand) of Steveston, British Columbia, in 1995 before selling off the Clover Leaf brand in 1999. In 2001, Weston put Connors Bros back up for sale on the public market, and it became locally managed again.

Cloverleaf and Bumblebee brands were merged, then re-merged with the Connors Brothers to become the Connors Brothers Income Fund in 2004. This company was acquired by Centre Partners, a middle market private equity firm in 2008. In 2010, Connors Brothers (now part of Bumble Bee Foods) was sold to a British Private equity firm Lion Capital LLP.

Connors Brothers has enjoyed fame associated with its products appearing on M*A*S*H in 1982, being discussed on Northern Exposure, and being held aloft by NHL star Jaromír Jágr for The Hockey News.

== Murder ==
In 1942, 19 year old Bernice Connors, the granddaughter of founder Lewis Connors, was raped and murdered after a local dance by British armourer Thomas Roland Hutchings from RCAF Station Pennfield Ridge who was convicted and hanged after entering no plea.
