= Robert Watson Grimmer =

Canadian politician

Robert Watson Grimmer (October 25, 1866 – November 4, 1948) was a merchant and politician from New Brunswick, Canada. He represented Charlotte County in the Legislative Assembly of New Brunswick from 1915 to 1920 and Charlotte in the House of Commons of Canada from 1921 to 1930 as a Conservative member.

He was born in Saint Stephen, New Brunswick, the son of William Wey Grimmer and Margaret Wilson. In 1859, he married Mary B. Harrison. Grimmer served on the town council for Saint Stephen and was mayor from 1908 to 1909. He also served on the St. Stephen Water Commission and as a school trustee. Grimmer was a Mason and a member of the Knights of Pythias.

== Electoral history ==
1926 Canadian federal election: Charlotte
Party	Candidate	Votes	%	±%
Conservative	Robert Watson Grimmer	4,967	57.5	-4.9
Liberal	Elmer McLaughlin	3,677	42.5	+4.9
Total valid votes		8,644	100.0	

1925 Canadian federal election: Charlotte
Party	Candidate	Votes	%	±%
Conservative	Robert Watson Grimmer	5,202	62.4	+11.8
Liberal	William Albert Holt	3,274	37.6	-11.8
Total valid votes		8,476	100.0	

1921 Canadian federal election: Charlotte
Party	Candidate	Votes	%	±%
Conservative	Robert Watson Grimmer	5,202	50.6	-4.6
Liberal	William Frederick Todd	5,069	49.4	+4.6
Total valid votes		10,271	100.0	

Parliament of Canada
Preceded by Thomas Aaron Hartt	Charlotte; 1921-1930	Succeeded by Arthur D. Ganong
