= Gilbert Ganong =

Canadian politician

The Honourable Gilbert White Ganong
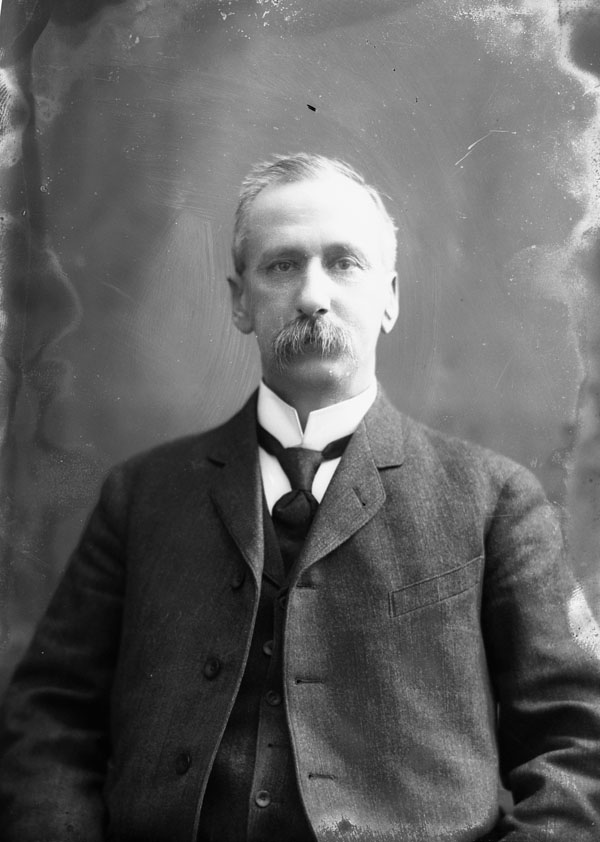
- Ganong in April 1907

Member of Parliament for Charlotte
- In office August 19, 1896 – September 17, 1908
- Preceded by: Arthur Hill Gillmor
- Succeeded by: William Frederick Todd

14th Lieutenant Governor of New Brunswick
- In office June 29, 1917 – October 31, 1917
- Monarch: George V
- Governor General: The Duke of Devonshire
- Premier: Walter E. Foster
- Preceded by: Josiah Wood
- Succeeded by: William Pugsley

Personal details
- Born: May 22, 1851 Springfield, New Brunswick, British North America
- Died: October 31, 1917 (aged 66) St. Stephen, New Brunswick, Canada
- Resting place: St. Stephen Rural Cemetery
- Party: Liberal-Conservative
- Spouse: Maria Famicha Robinson (m. 1876)
- Children: No children
- Parent(s): Francis Daniel Ganong & Deborah Ruth Kierstead
- Occupation: Businessman, politician, statesman

Gilbert White Ganong (May 22, 1851 – October 31, 1917) was a Canadian politician, the 14th Lieutenant Governor of New Brunswick and co-founder of Ganong Bros. Limited, candy makers in the town of St. Stephen.

Born in Springfield, New Brunswick, the son of Francis Daniel Ganong and Deborah Ruth Kierstead, he was a descendant of Jean Guenon, a Huguenot exile from La Rochelle, France, who settled in New Amsterdam during the second half of the 17th century then several generations later following the American Revolutionary War; some of Guenon's descendants were United Empire Loyalists who settled in New Brunswick (then part of Nova Scotia) in 1783.

In 1873, Gilbert Ganong co-founded Ganong Bros. Limited, with his brother James.

In 1896, he was elected to the House of Commons of Canada for the riding of Charlotte. A Liberal-Conservative, he was re-elected in 1900 and 1904, but was defeated in 1908.

On June 29, 1917, he was appointed Lieutenant Governor of New Brunswick and served until his death in October. His death was due to "intestinal toxemia complications with nephritis". He was 66 years of age.

1908 Canadian federal election: Charlotte
Party	Candidate	Votes	%	±%
Liberal	William Frederick Todd	2,691	51.9	+4.5
Conservative	Gilbert White Ganong	2,491	48.1	-4.5
Total valid votes		5,182	100.0	

1904 Canadian federal election: Charlotte
Party	Candidate	Votes	%	±%
Conservative	Gilbert White Ganong	2,574	52.6	-3.2
Liberal	Daniel Gillmor	2,320	47.4	+3.2
Total valid votes		4,894	100.0	

1900 Canadian federal election: Charlotte
Party	Candidate	Votes	%	±%
Conservative	Gilbert White Ganong	2,785	55.8	+0.5
Liberal	Robert Armstrong	2,205	44.2	-0.5
Total valid votes		4,990	100.0	

1896 Canadian federal election: Charlotte
Party	Candidate	Votes	%	±%
Conservative	Gilbert White Ganong	2,453	55.3	+8.7
Liberal	Arthur Hill Gillmor	1,981	44.7	-8.7
Total valid votes		4,434	100.0	
