= A. Wesley Stuart =

Canadian politician (1902–1984)

Wesley Stuart

Member of Parliament for Charlotte
- In office June 11, 1945 – March 31, 1958
- Preceded by: Burton M. Hill
- Succeeded by: Caldwell Stewart

Personal details
- Born: February 11, 1902 Deer Island, New Brunswick, Canada
- Died: November 29, 1984 (aged 82) Fredericton, New Brunswick, Canada
- Party: Liberal Party of Canada
- Spouse: Marguerite Graham (1899–1961)
- Profession: Commercial fisherman

Andrew Wesley Stuart (February 11, 1902 – November 29, 1984) was a Canadian commercial fisherman and politician from the Province of New Brunswick.

Known as Wes, he was born at Deer Island, New Brunswick, the son of Andrew Holmes Stuart and Laura Gertrude Thompson. Raised in a place where fishing was a major part of the economy, he fished for a living and worked as a government fishing industry inspector.

In the 1945 Canadian federal election, Stuart was elected as the Liberal Party's candidate for the riding of Charlotte. He was reelected in 1949, 1953, and again in 1957.

Stuart lived on the bank of the St. Croix River and frequently travelled across the border to Maine. A proponent of free trade, in 1951 Stuart received publicityt for his statements in the House of Commons of Canada on cross-border smuggling. Time magazine reported that he declared he had "been a smuggler all his life—and intended to keep on being one," adding that he "never came through [the border] in my lifetime that I did not smuggle something."

Stuart's straight talk met with wide approval by his constituents and in the ensuing federal election, he won his third term in office with the largest majority of his political career. However, colleagues began referring to him as a "dim-witted foul-mouthed saboteur" regularly.

In the 1958 electoral sweep by the Progressive Conservatives under John Diefenbaker, Stuart lost his seat to Caldwell Stewart. While remaining active in politics, Stuart was the runner up to Louis Robichaud in a bid for leader of the provincial Liberals later in 1958 and went on to serve as the New Brunswick Liberal Party President from 1960 to 1963.

On October 23, 1924, he married Julia Marguerite Graham (1899–1961). The couple had three children, Janet Saint, Roy Graham "Bud" Stuart, and Jacqueline (Jackie) Smith. Stuart died in 1984. He and his wife are buried in the St. Andrews, New Brunswick, Rural Cemetery.

== Electoral history ==
1958 Canadian federal election: Charlotte
Party	Candidate	Votes	%	±%
Progressive Conservative	Caldwell Stewart	5,756	52.6	+5.2
Liberal	Wesley Stuart	5,806	47.4	-5.2
Total valid votes		11,562	100.0	

1957 Canadian federal election: Charlotte
Party	Candidate	Votes	%	±%
Liberal	Wesley Stuart	6,393	52.6	+0.2
Progressive Conservative	Lorne B. Groom	5,756	47.4	+3.3
Total valid votes		12,149	100.0	

1953 Canadian federal election: Charlotte
Party	Candidate	Votes	%	±%
Liberal	Wesley Stuart	6,155	52.4	+2.2
Progressive Conservative	Hardy N. Ganong	5,180	44.1	-5.4
Co-operative Commonwealth	Tom William Jones	416	3.5	*
Total valid votes		11,751	100.0	

1949 Canadian federal election: Charlotte
Party	Candidate	Votes	%	±%
Liberal	Wesley Stuart	6,197	50.2	+0.1
Progressive Conservative	Hardy N. Ganong	6,139	49.8	-0.1
Total valid votes		12,336	100.0	

1945 Canadian federal election: Charlotte
Party	Candidate	Votes	%	±%
Liberal	Wesley Stuart	5,486	50.1	-8.0
Progressive Conservative	Chauncey Randall Pollard	5,456	49.9	+8.0
Total valid votes		10,942	100.0	

Preceded by Harry A. Corey; 1953-1959	New Brunswick Liberal Party President; 1960–1963	Succeeded by Daniel A. Riley; 1963-1964
