= Irving Randall Todd =

Canadian politician (1861–1932)

The Hon. Irving Randall Todd

Senator for Milltown, New Brunswick
- In office 1918–1932
- Appointed by: Robert Borden

Personal details
- Born: December 15, 1861 Milltown, New Brunswick
- Died: December 27, 1932 (aged 71) Milltown, New Brunswick
- Party: Conservative
- Spouse: Frances E. Boardman (m. 1882)
- Children: Charles F. Todd

Irving Randall Todd (December 15, 1861 – December 27, 1932) was a Canadian lumber merchant and politician.

Born in Milltown, New Brunswick, the son of Charles F. and Annie M. (Porter) Todd, Todd was educated at Hallowell Classical School, New Brunswick High School in Milltown and St. Stephen. When he was eighteen, he entered into business with his father. He worked for the Eastern Pulpwood Company and was president of Fundy Fisheries Company. He was also president of New Brunswick & Canada Railway Company. He was also a Director of the New Brunswick Telephone Company. He was called to the Senate of Canada for the senatorial division of Milltown, New Brunswick on the advice of Conservative Prime Minister Robert Borden in 1918. He served until his death in 1932.
