= Arthur Hill Gillmor =

Canadian politician (1824–1903)

The Hon. Arthur Hill Gillmor
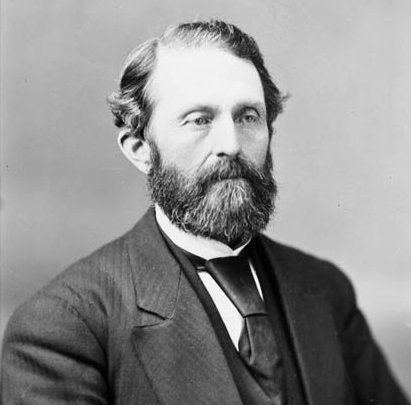

Member of the Canadian Parliament for Charlotte
- In office 1872–1896
- Preceded by: John McAdam
- Succeeded by: Gilbert Ganong

Senator for New Brunswick
- In office 1900–1903
- Appointed by: Wilfrid Laurier

Personal details
- Born: March 12, 1824 Saint George, New Brunswick
- Died: April 13, 1903 (aged 79) Mattawamkeag, Maine, USA
- Party: Liberal
- Children: Daniel Gillmor

Arthur Hill Gillmor (March 12, 1824 – April 13, 1903) was a Canadian farmer, lumberman and Liberal politician from New Brunswick. He was the son of Daniel and Purmelia Gillmor, both native of New Brunswick. He was educated at the St. Andrews Grammar School, St. Andrews and later engaged in the local lumber and farming business. Mr. Gillmor married Hannah Dawes Howe, of Maine, in January 1846. They had four children: Daniel, Henry, Percy and Delia.

Mr. Gillmor sat in New Brunswick's House of Assembly for five terms, and gained a reputation for integrity. The last of these mandates was as provincial secretary in Albert James Smith's government, which had run on a platform opposing Confederation. When the Smith government was defeated in the 1866 election, Gillmor left politics for a time to concentrate on business.

After Confederation, he represented the riding of Charlotte, New Brunswick in the House of Commons of Canada from 1874 to 1896. In 1879, Gillmor, noted as a "Free Trade stalwart", was challenged by Colonel Domville who supported protectionist tariffs - leading Gillmor to quip "I gaze, and as I gaze the wonder grows how one small face can carry so much nose" in regards to Domville's nose "of Wellingtonian proportions".

He was a strong candidate for the office of Lieutenant-Governor of New Brunswick in 1899, being strongly endorsed by his former political opponents as well as supporters, but did not secure the appointment.

He was subsequently appointed Canadian commissioner to the World's Fair at Paris.

He was appointed to the Senate by Sir Wilfrid Laurier in 1900, where he served until his death in 1903, when he died on a train in Mattawamkeag, Maine while en route to Ottawa after a return trip to his hometown of St. George. Mr. Gillmor is buried in the St. George Rural Cemetery, in St. George, New Brunswick.

His son Daniel also served in the Senate from 1907 to 1918.

== Electoral results ==
1896 Canadian federal election: Charlotte
Party	Candidate	Votes	%	±%
Conservative	Gilbert White Ganong	2,453	55.3	+8.7
Liberal	Arthur Hill Gillmor	1,981	44.7	-8.7
Total valid votes		4,434	100.0	

1891 Canadian federal election: Charlotte
Party	Candidate	Votes	%	±%
Liberal	Arthur Hill Gillmor	1,934	53.4	+2.3
Conservative	George J. Clarke	1,686	46.6	-2.3
Total valid votes		3,620	100.0	

1887 Canadian federal election: Charlotte
Party	Candidate	Votes	%	±%
Liberal	Arthur Hill Gillmor	1,892	51.1	-4.5
Conservative	John D. Chipman	1,811	48.9	+4.5
Total valid votes		3,703	100.0	

1882 Canadian federal election: Charlotte
Party	Candidate	Votes	%	±%
Liberal	Arthur Hill Gillmor	1,558	55.6	+1.4
Conservative	Benjamin Robert Stephenson	1,244	44.4	-1.4
Total valid votes		2,802	100.0	

1878 Canadian federal election: Charlotte
Party	Candidate	Votes	%	±%
Liberal	Arthur Hill Gillmor	1,522	54.2	-1.2
Conservative	John McAdam	1,284	45.8	+1.2
Total valid votes		2,806	100.0	

1874 Canadian federal election: Charlotte
Party	Candidate	Votes	%	±%
Liberal	Arthur Hill Gillmor	1,518	55.4	+9.3
Conservative	John McAdam	1,222	44.6	-9.3
Total valid votes		2,740	100.0	
Source(s) "Charlotte, New Brunswick (1867-08-06 - 1968-04-22)". History of Federal Ridings Since 1867. Library of Parliament.

1872 Canadian federal election: Charlotte
Party	Candidate	Votes	%	±%
Conservative	John McAdam	1,551	53.9	
Liberal	Arthur Hill Gillmor	1,329	46.1	-10.8
Total valid votes		2,880	100.0	
Source: Canadian Elections Database
