= Daniel Gillmor =

Canadian politician (1849–1918)

Daniel Gillmor (July 1, 1849 – February 22, 1918) was a merchant and political figure in New Brunswick, Canada. He sat for St. George division in the Senate of Canada from 1907 to 1918 as a Liberal.

He was born in St. George, New Brunswick, the son of Arthur Hill Gillmor and Hannah Dawes Howe. His father also served as a Senator (1900-1903). Daniel married Catherine Sophia Duffy on 28 Nov 1877 in Lowell, Middlesex, Massachusetts. They had six children: two girls and four boys. He ran unsuccessfully for a seat in the House of Commons in 1904. He died in office at the age of 68.
