= CHCO-TV =

Television station in Saint Andrews, New Brunswick

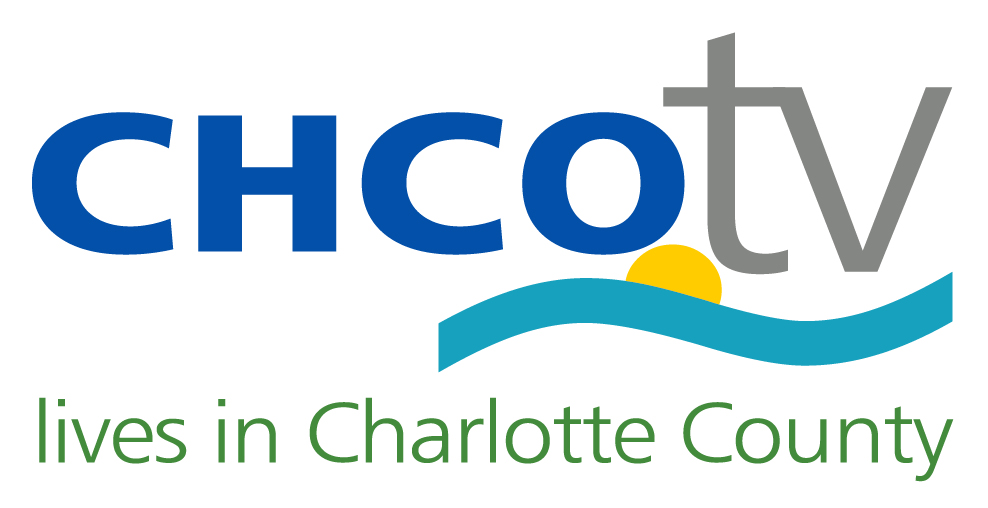
- Saint Andrews, New Brunswick; Canada
- Channels: Digital: 26 (UHF); Virtual: 26
- Branding: CHCO-TV

Programming
- Affiliations: Independent, Shop LC (overnights)

Ownership
- Owner: St. Andrews Community Channel Inc.

History
- Founded: March 13, 1993 (on cable); November 1, 2006 (broadcast)
- Former call signs: CHCT-TV (2006–2012)
- Call sign meaning: Charlotte County Television

Technical information
- Licensing authority: CRTC
- ERP: 0.04 kW
- HAAT: 33 m (108 ft)
- Transmitter coordinates: 45°4′51″N 67°3′29″W

Links
- Website: chco.tv

CHCO-TV (channel 26) is a community television station in Saint Andrews, New Brunswick, Canada, serving the Charlotte County area. The station also has production facilities in Harvey and on Grand Manan.

The station is available over-the-air in Saint Andrews, Rogers Cable 126 in Charlotte County, Bell Fibe TV 26 throughout the province, and Bell Satellite 539 elsewhere.

== History ==
CHCO-TV launched on March 13, 1993, on Fundy Cable channel 4, and was later licensed by the CRTC in November 2005, and began operation on UHF channel 26 in 2006. On August 18, 2010, CHCT-TV moved from cable channel 10 to channel 9. In 2012, CHCO-TV was added to the Bell TV satellite television service on channel 539. In 2018, CHCO-TV became available on cable channel 126.

The advent of fibre optic technology and digital cable led to the shutdown of almost 30 community channels in New Brunswick, including those in the neighboring communities of St. Stephen and St. George.

CHCO-TV is the first community LPTV station in New Brunswick to operate independently from the cable television provider. It is also the only locally owned and operated television station in the province of New Brunswick.
