= Benjamin Robert Stephenson =

Canadian lawyer and politician

MLA for Charlotte County
- In office 1867 to 1882

Personal details
- Born: April 10, 1835 St. Andrews, New Brunswick
- Died: January 16, 1890 (aged 54) Charlotte County, New Brunswick
- Party: Liberal Party of New Brunswick

Benjamin Robert Stephenson (April 10, 1835 – January 16, 1890) was a lawyer and political figure in New Brunswick, Canada. He represented Charlotte County in the Legislative Assembly of New Brunswick as a Liberal member from 1867 to 1882. His surname also appears as Stevenson in some sources.

He was born in St. Andrews, New Brunswick, the son of Robert Stephenson, and was educated there and at the University of New Brunswick. Stephenson was called to the bar in 1860 and, in 1866, he married Kate Bolton, the sister of John Bolton, who represented Charlotte in the federal parliament. He served as registrar of probates for the county. Stephenson was named to the Executive Council of New Brunswick as Surveyor General in 1871. He served as speaker for the legislative assembly from 1879 to 1882. He died in 1890.
