= Whidden =

Whidden is a surname. Notable people with the surname include:

- Benjamin F. Whidden (1813–1896), American attorney, judge, teacher, and diplomat
- Bob Whidden (born 1946), former professional ice hockey player
- Charles B. Whidden (1835–1902), farmer, merchant, ship owner and political figure in Nova Scotia, Canada
- Evan M. Whidden (1898–1980), Canadian Christian minister, President of Brandon College, Dean of Theology at Acadia University
- Holly Whidden, American magazine executive and television producer
- Howard P. Whidden (1871–1952), Canadian churchman, member of Parliament, educator, scholar and editor of Canadian Baptist
- James Whidden Allison (1795–1867), farmer and political figure in Nova Scotia
- R. Whidden Ganong, CM (1906–2000), Canadian businessman from the province of New Brunswick
- Richard Whidden, 1989 Mystery Lake School Division Trustee, Manitoba, Canada
- Tom Whidden (born 1948), American sailor and sailmaker
- William M. Whidden (1857–1929), founding member of Whidden & Lewis, an architectural firm in Portland, Oregon, United States

== See also ==
- Whidden Creek, a stream in Florida
- Whidden & Lewis, architectural firm in Portland, Oregon, United States
- Whidden Lectures, at McMaster University
- Whidden Memorial Hospital, 162-bed medical/surgical and psychiatric hospital in Everett, Massachusetts
- Whidden–Kerr House and Garden, Portland, Oregon, listed on the National Register of Historic Places
- Weiden (disambiguation)
- WiDEN
- Widen
- Wieden (disambiguation)
- Wyden (disambiguation)
