= Ganong =

Ganong may refer to:

- Ganong Bros., a Canadian chocolates company
- Gilbert Ganong (1851–1917), Canadian politician and co-founder of Ganong Bros. Limited
- Arthur D. Ganong (1877–1960), Canadian politician
- David A. Ganong (born 1943), former president and current chairman of the Board of Ganong Bros. Limited
- Travis Ganong (born 1988), American alpine ski racer
- William Francis Ganong (1864–1941) Canadian botanist, historian and cartographer
- William Francis Ganong, Jr. (1924–2007) American mammalian physiologist
