= Fruit Gems =

Candy

Sunkist Fruit Gems
- A package of Sunkist Fruit Gems
- Type: Pectin jelly candy
- Place of origin: United States
- Created by: Christopher Candy Company
- Invented: 1930s

Sunkist Fruit Gems are sugar-coated pectin jelly candies sold under license from Sunkist Growers. The candy was introduced in the 1930s by the Christopher Candy Company, and later produced by the Los Angeles-based Ben Myerson Candy Company. It was manufactured by Jelly Belly from 2006 until 2026.

== History ==
The origins of Fruit Gems date to the 1930s, when an oversupply of citrus led Sunkist growers to seek uses for surplus oranges, lemons and grapefruits. Sunkist approached the Christopher Candy Company of Los Angeles to develop a confection using citrus byproducts. The resulting Christopher's Fruit Gems were subsequently sold across the United States.

The Ben Myerson Candy Company acquired the Christopher Candy Company in 1955. In 1974, (Note: According to some sources, 1966.) the company entered into a licensing agreement with Sunkist to sell the candies under the Sunkist name. The flavors of this period consisted of orange, lemon, lime, cherry, raspberry and grapefruit.

Jelly Belly acquired the Ben Myerson Candy Company's candy-making operation in 2006. The flavor assortment was then changed to orange, lemon, lime and raspberry. In 2012, Jelly Belly relaunched Fruit Gems with natural flavors and colors in lemon, orange, grapefruit, raspberry and blueberry flavors.

Jelly Belly was acquired by the Ferrara Candy Company in 2023. Ferrara stopped selling Sunkist Fruit Gems on May 1, 2026, with a customer-service representative attributing the decision to insufficient nationwide demand.

On September 26, 2026, following publicity over the discontinuation, Sunkist announced that it had found a new manufacturer and that Fruit Gems would return with no changes to its recipe or kosher certification.

== Culture ==
Sunkist Fruit Gems are particularly popular among Jews in North America. Their kosher certification, individual wrapping, and soft texture made them commonly used at synagogue celebrations, including bar and bat mitzvah ceremonies and aufrufs, where candy is traditionally thrown toward the celebrants.
