= J. Edwin Ganong =

Canadian businessman

Ganong
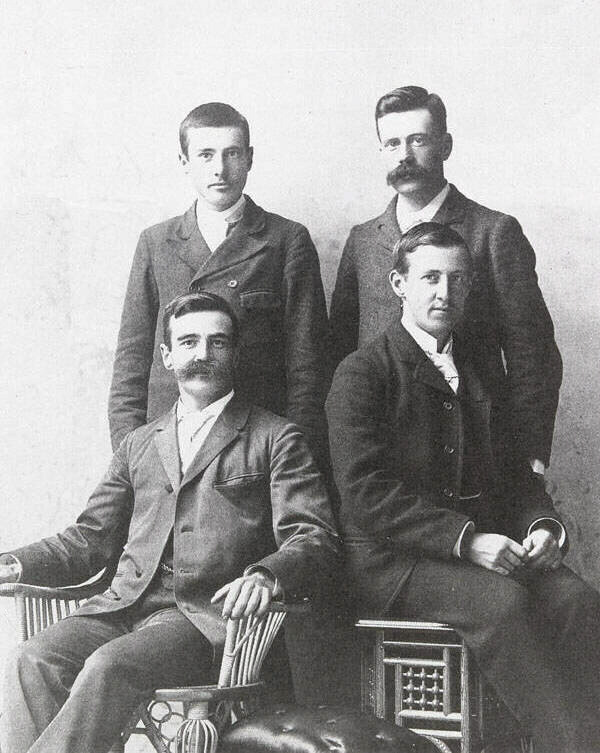
- Sons of James H. Ganong, 1895; Walter and Edwin (standing), William and Arthur (seated)
- Born: March 29, 1866; Boston, Massachusetts; United States
- Died: May 6, 1944 (aged 78); Toronto, Ontario; Canada
- Resting place: St. Stephen Rural Cemetery
- Occupation: Businessman
- Spouse(s): Anna Louisa Webb (1879-1945)
- Children: James Edwin Ganong Jr., Jean Webb Ganong (1905-1980), married prominent Maine lumberman, Henry Boardman Eaton II (1902-1950). They had three daughters.
- Parent(s): James Harvey Ganong & Susan E. Brittain

James Edwin Ganong (March 29, 1866 – May 6, 1944) was a Canadian businessman. Known as Edwin, he was born in Boston, Massachusetts, where his Canadian parents had relatives. The son of James H. Ganong and Susan E. Brittain, he is the brother of Susie, Kit (Whidden), Arthur, and William.

His family returned to their native New Brunswick when Edwin was still a young boy. Living in the border town of St. Stephen, in 1873 his father and uncle Gilbert Ganong founded Ganong Bros., a grocery and bakery business that became a very successful manufacturer of chocolate confectionery. In 1878 the brothers established the St. Croix Soap Manufacturing Company but in 1884 they elected to dissolve their partnership and Edwin's father became the sole owner of the soap factory.

Edwin Ganong would join his father in his successful soap-making business. Following his father's untimely death in 1888, the twenty-two-year-old Edwin found himself in charge and quickly proved himself an astute businessman and marketer. His company was best known for its Surprise Soap that became a national brand which was produced until 1946. Advertising helped sell the company's products but Edwin seized other opportunities such as the 1894 publishing of The Surprise Cook Book, a recipe collection formally registered as The Premium Cook Book by the then widely popular American writer Marion Harland.

On January 24, 1903, Edwin Ganong married Boston, Massachusetts native Anna Louisa Webb. The couple had a son, Brigadier General James Edwin Jr.

In 1913, Edwin Ganong sold the St. Croix Soap Manufacturing Company to Lever Brothers of Toronto, Ontario, a subsidiary of the British conglomerate. Ganong became president of Lever Brothers and moved to Toronto. Socially active, they maintained a summer home at fashionable St. Andrews, New Brunswick. Edwin Ganong died in Toronto in 1944 and his wife died the following year.
