= Elizabeth Jane Bullard =

American landscape architect (1847–1916)

Elizabeth Jane Bullard (11 January 1847 – 14 August 1916) was the first woman to practice landscape architecture in the USA. In 1899, she was the first non-founding member to be elected as a fellow of the American Society of Landscape Architects.

She was known as "the first professional woman landscape architect in the United States".

== Early life ==
Bullard was born on January 11, 1847, to Oliver Crosby Bullard and Sarah Jane Hartwell in Sutton, Massachusetts, and was their eldest daughter.

Her father, Oliver was the youngest of ten children. His sister Eunice was married to Reverend Henry Ward Beecher, the well-known nineteenth-century minister and abolitionist. It is through this connection that Elizabeth knew Henry Ward Beecher's sisters, Harriet Beecher Stowe and Catherine Esther Beecher, two of the most influential women writers and reformers of their day.

In 1858, Oliver Bullard was hired by Reverend Beecher to work as the principal of his school for young boys in Lenox, Massachusetts. However, Beecher observed that Oliver was a better superintendent of his fields than a headmaster and so he requested that Oliver manage his farm in Peekskill, New York. Within this farmland, Beecher built a 20 room mansion, which he named "Boscobel", now known as the Beecher-McFadden Estate, and used it as a vacation home. These 36 acres of Hudson River valley farmland provided a living laboratory for Elizabeth, where she pursued her interests in horticulture as she assisted her father in managing the farm and learned agronomy, cultivation practices, and project management, which were essential in her later career as a landscape architect.

== Early work with Oliver Crosby Bullard ==
=== Prospect Park, Brooklyn, New York ===
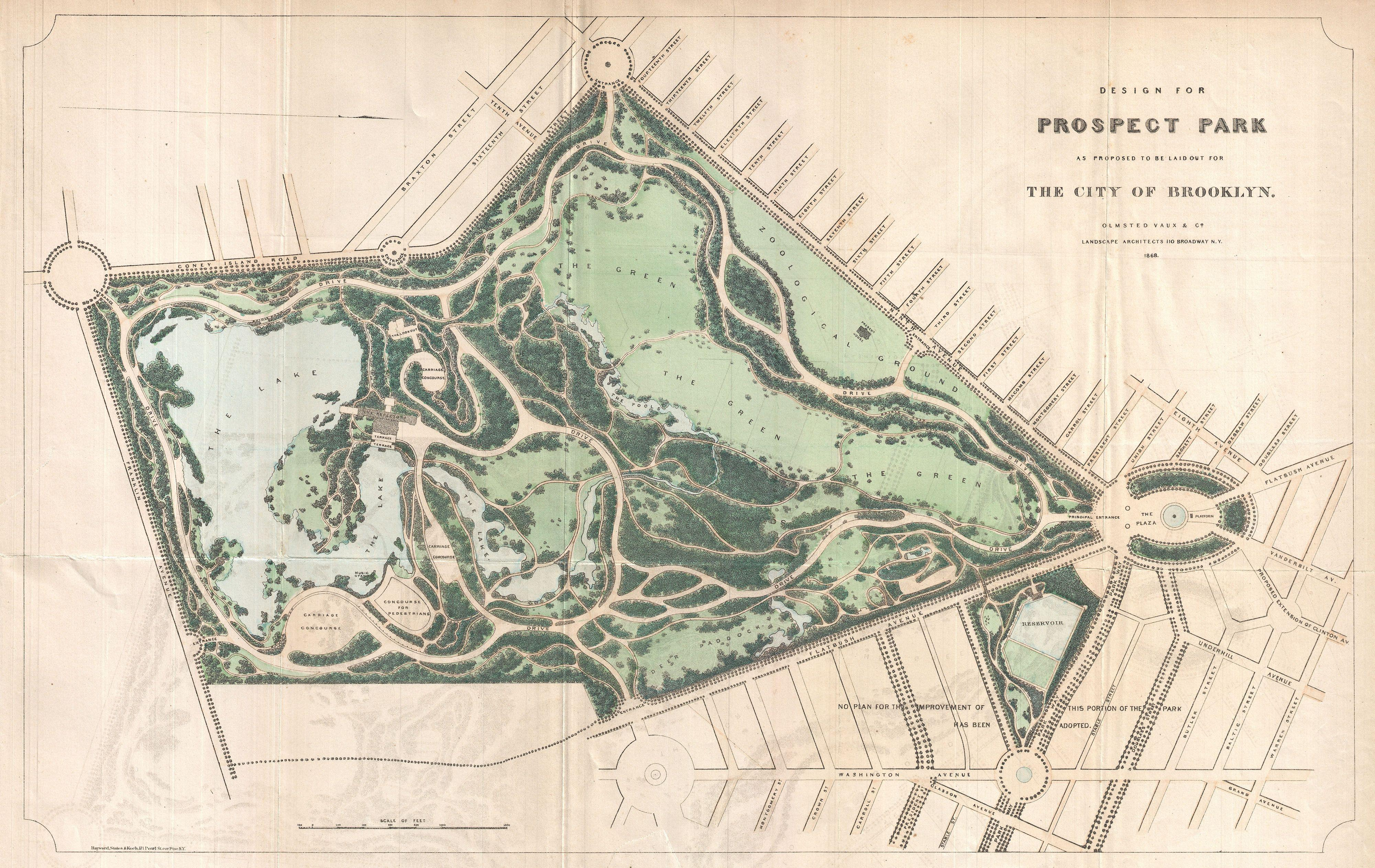
1868 Map of Prospect Park, designed by Vaux and Olmsted

When Oliver joined the newly formed United States Sanitary Commission, he established a long relationship with the Commission's executive secretary Frederick Law Olmsted, Sr., the "father" of landscape architecture.

When the Commission closed its offices in 1867, Prospect Park started construction. Olmsted requested the assistance of Oliver Bullard, where for the first few months Oliver assisted Ignaz Pilat, who oversaw plantings for the new park. Later, Bullard was named supervisor of planting, a position he held in all later projects with the Olmsted Firm. Elizabeth assisted her father during the construction of the park, methodically observing the progress of planting operations in the park and relaying reports to her father for further action. During this time, Elizabeth's fascination of how the landscape has transformed is documented in one of her notes saying:

My very youthful interest in it all at the time was chiefly in the spectacular effect of the transformation of scenes, as the hard wood-edges were broken into natural lines, and the fine individual trees took their places upon the lawns and meadows and along the driveways, with so little apparent disturbance of their comfort and well-being.

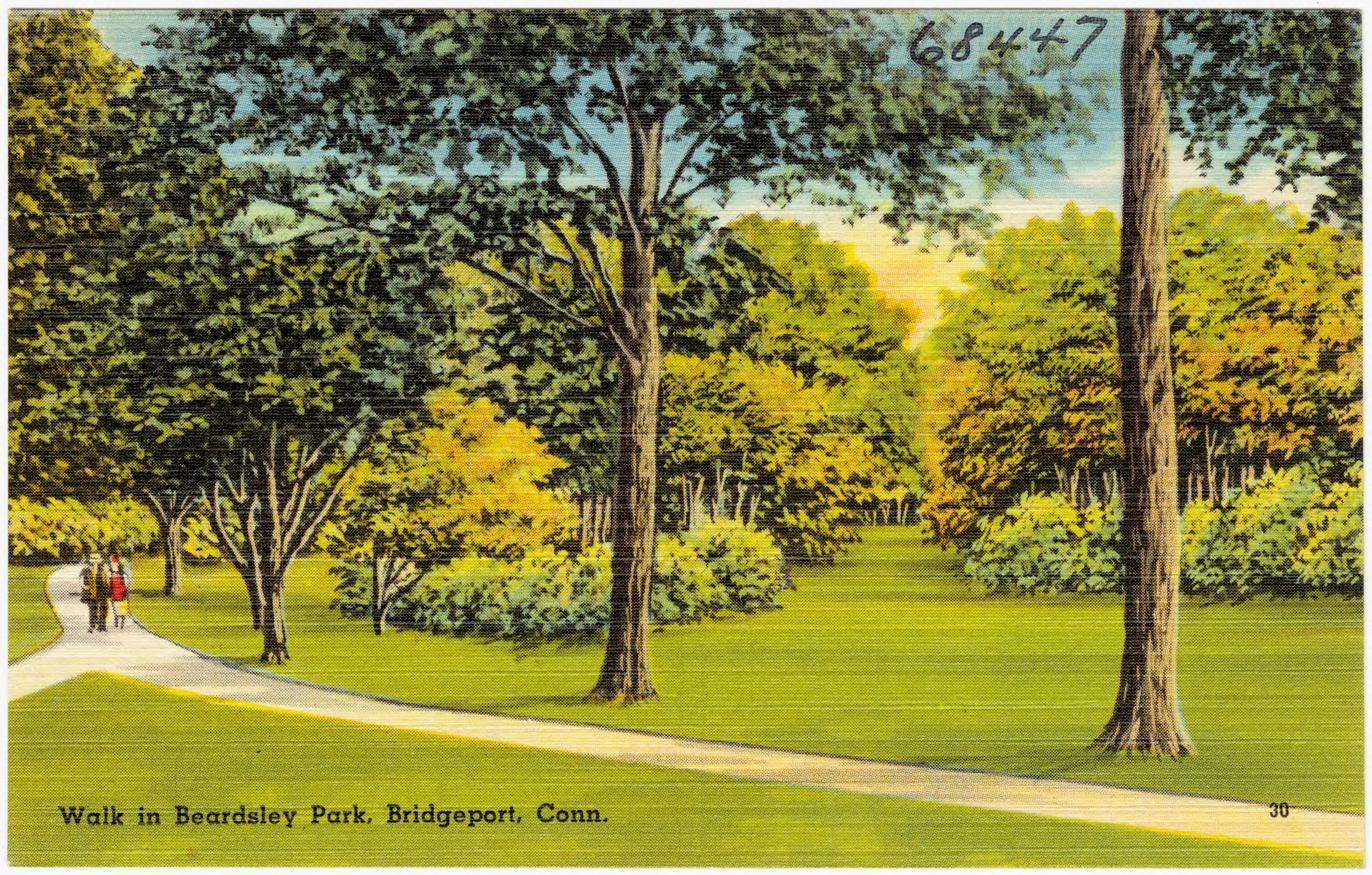
Trees planted at Beardsley Park

=== Beardsley Park, Connecticut ===
By the early 1880s, Oliver Bullard was spending the majority of his time supervising park work for the Olmsted firm in Bridgeport, Connecticut. In Beardsley Park, one of the premier examples of Frederick Law Olmsted's designs in Connecticut, Elizabeth's father was brought in to assist by planting trees he had raised himself in neat rows and matched pairs. Throughout this phase, Elizabeth was Bullard's "unofficial collaborator".

=== Superintendent, Bridgeport City Parks ===
Because of his work at Beardsley Park, Bridgeport appointed Oliver as Superintendent of Parks in 1884. During this time, Bridgeport became famous as a "Park City" - a modern community with two Olmsted-designed parks within the city environs. The Bullards moved into the city as Elizabeth's father assumed his new position in 1885.

During this period, Elizabeth had begun to take on design projects for owners of large homes and neighboring properties in Bridgeport.

When Oliver Bullard died suddenly in October, 1890, Olmsted recommended to the city council that Bridgeport name Elizabeth as his successor. Olmsted Sr. noted her training under her father and advised the park commission to:

be prepared to trust much to her discretion and to support her against any possible prejudice due to the novelty of the situation in which she will be placed. It would, in my judgment, be more prudent to give her greater freedom of discretion in all matters of her duty, rather than less than you would be prepared to give a man under similar circumstances.

Despite Olmsted's endorsement, Elizabeth declined the position, citing the prejudices and political challenges a woman might have faced as a practicing professional.

== Professional career ==
Although she declined the job of Bridgeport Park Superintendent, Bullard was busy in her professional work completing her father's projects. In one of her letters to an acquaintance, she anticipated "to continue his life work of landscape gardening. I have happily been proceeding to the satisfaction of my patrons, who are to be sure, my friends, and perhaps a little bit partial". In doing so, Bullard must have maintained a regional or national network of projects and clients in completing her father's projects.

Her involvement in professional organizations can be attested by her attendance to meetings and responses to queries. In one of her letters in late 1903 to Olmsted's son, Frederick Law Olmsted Jr., she asked for his opinion regarding the merger of two organizations in which she held membership, the American Park and Outdoor Art Association and the American League for Civic Improvement. Other correspondence validates how Bullard's opinions were requested when important matters in the profession were being considered. For example, in the mid 1890s, when practitioners were being queried as to the value of an organization for landscape architects, her response was a testament to her dedication and support to the profession. In another letter, she expressed her confidence that women in the profession will someday be accepted by the society saying:

But I am convinced that this field is open to the women of the future, as well as that of the interior decoration of homes where women live, and in which, outdoors and in, they should be most-deeply interested.

As the first woman to practice landscape architecture, Bullard countered the public's preconceptions against women pursuing professional careers.

Bullard continued working on numerous private commissions across New York, Connecticut, New Jersey, Maryland, and Virginia, but very little information is available is held about her clients and projects. It is also assumed that she undertook projects for the Barnum relatives whom she was personally acquainted with, as well as with other well-to-do residents of Bridgeport.

She was associated with Bushnell Park in Hartford and consulted with other projects. One project that documents Bullard's collaboration with the Olmsted firm is the grounds for Smith College in the early 1890s. Directed by Warren Manning, the firm's chief horticulturist, Bullard supervised the planting of over 1,200 trees and shrubs in 1893. However, her position at the college was unclear - whether in art, botany, or landscape work. She wrote to the firm about this ambiguity of her situation at the same time and expressed her interest to the position as director of the Botanical Garden.

== First elected member of the ASLA ==
The eleven founding members of the American Society of Landscape Architects met in Boston on December 23, 1899, and selected Bullard as the first "new fellow" or twelfth member of the ASLA; she was the second woman to be elected to this position.

== Death ==
Bullard died on August 14, 1916, in her home at Barnum's Marina mansion, with views of Seaside Park. She was laid to rest two days later in Mountain Grove Cemetery alongside her parents.

In her obituaries, she is remembered as "the well-known landscape artist" with "many friends in the city who will grieve her." The Bridgeport Evening Post observed that "many of the gardens in this city are the result of her efforts, she having been a landscape architect of no mean ability."

== Legacy ==
As a critical person in the history of landscape architecture, and a role model for other women in the first half of the twentieth century, Elizabeth Bullard, has been a forgotten figure in the history of landscape architecture. The majority of Elizabeth's works were completed prior to the founding of American Society of Landscape Architects (ASLA), no plans, design documentation, or built examples are known to exist. Even as an active member, she declined to exhibit her drawings at the ASLA meetings. As a result, her contributions to the profession were overlooked in favor of other pioneering female landscape architects like of Beatrix Farrand and Marian Coffin. In fact, in one of the notes by Frederick Law Olmsted Jr., he observed that Miss Bullard "was a capable but very modest and self-deprecating practitioner".

In January 2020, the Connecticut Chapter of the American Society of Landscape Architects established the "Elizabeth Bullard Award" to recognize the achievements of female landscape architects in Connecticut and advance the goal of gender equity in the profession.
