= William Francis Ganong =

Canadian botanist, historian and cartographer (1864–1941)

William Francis Ganong FRSC
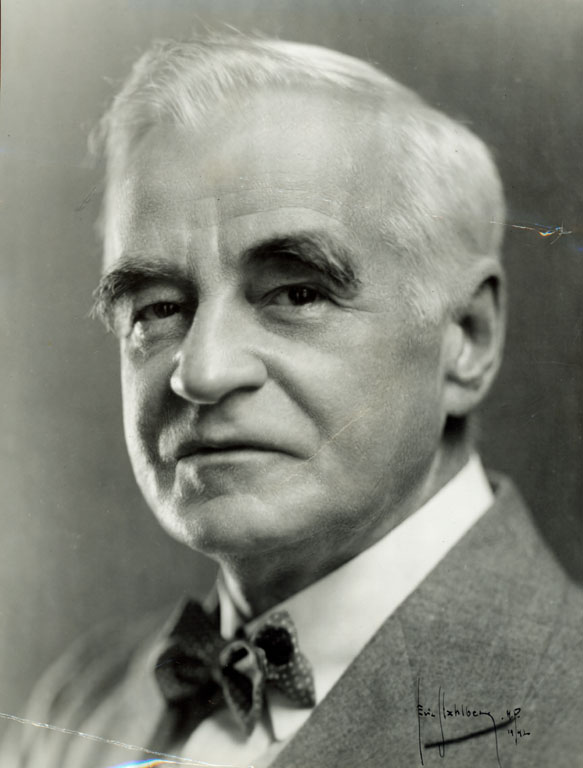
- Ganong in an undated photograph (published 1942)
- Born: February 19, 1864; Saint John, Colony of New Brunswick
- Died: September 7, 1941 (aged 77); Saint John, New Brunswick, Canada
- Resting place: St. Stephen Rural Cemetery
- Education: University of New Brunswick, Harvard University, Ludwig-Maximilians-Universität München
- Occupations: Botanist, historian, cartographer, educator, author
- Spouses: Jean Murray Carman (m. 1888; died 1920) Anna Hobbet (m. 1923)
- Children: William Francis Ganong Jr., Ann Ganong Seidler
- Father: James Harvey Ganong
- Relatives: Arthur (brother); James (brother); Susan B. Ganong (sister); Bliss Carman (brother-in-law)

William Francis Ganong FRSC (19 February 1864 – 7 September 1941) was a Canadian botanist, historian and cartographer. His botany career was spent mainly as a professor at Smith College in Northampton, Massachusetts. In his private life he contributed to the historical and geographical understanding of his native New Brunswick.

== Early life and education ==
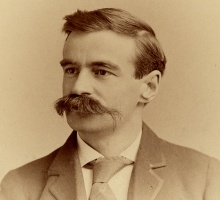
Ganong in 1895

William Francis Ganong was born on February 19, 1864, in Saint John, in what was previously Carleton, in pre-confederation New Brunswick, the eldest child of James Harvey Ganong and Susan E. Brittain, both of whom descended from United Empire Loyalists. He had six younger siblings, including Susan, Arthur, Edwin, and Kit. When he was nine years old, his family moved to St. Stephen where his father, along with his uncle, Gilbert Ganong, established the Ganong Brothers candy factory. It was expected that young William would enter the family business when he came of age, but early on, he showed an interest in the natural world. These interests extended to botany, reading, maps, and exploring the countryside. He was encouraged by his grandfather, who also had a strong interest in nature. He also showed a talent for languages. Through his life he would come to have at least a working knowledge of French, German, Maliseet and Mi'kmaq. He was an early naturalist and by the age of seventeen, he had first-hand knowledge of numerous rivers and coastal areas of New Brunswick as well as the flora and fauna of the province. His explorations would continue throughout his life, both on his own and with one or more companions including Arthur H. Pierce, Mauran I. Furbish and George Upham Hay. He received education from public school in St. Stephen, while attending his last year of high school in Saint John.

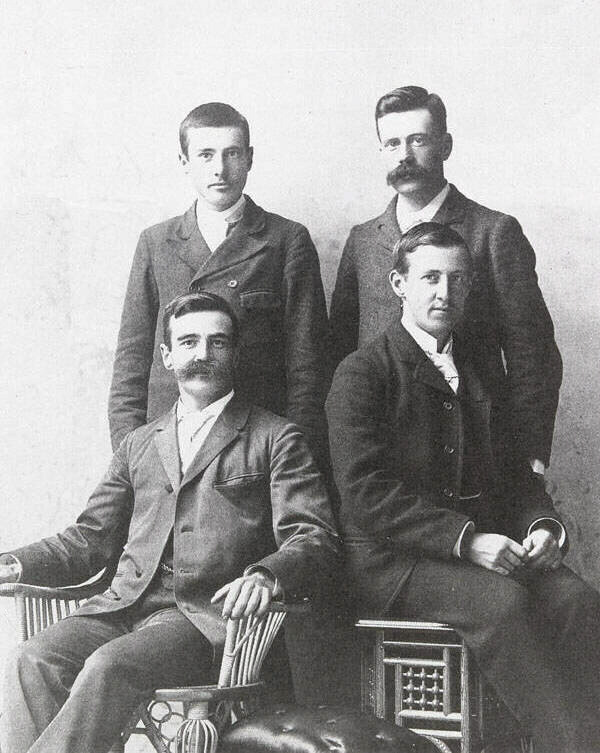
Sons of James H. Ganong, 1895; Walter and Edwin (standing), William and Arthur (seated)

Ganong attended the University of New Brunswick where he received a Bachelor of Arts degree in 1884 and his master's degree in 1886. The next year, he went to Boston where in 1887, he received an A.B. from Harvard University. He obtained a doctorate in biology from the Ludwig-Maximilians-Universität München in 1894 and published two papers in the German language. It was probably at Harvard that he met Jean Murray Carman, sister of his friend and fellow Harvard student, New Brunswick poet Bliss Carman. They married in 1888. The marriage lasted thirty-two years until her death in 1920. They had no children. Ganong remarried on June 20, 1923, with Anna Hobbet, a geology teacher from Iowa. They had two children, William Francis Ganong Jr., a renowned physiologist, and Ann Ganong Seidler, professor of speech theory and children's author.

== Career in botany ==
After graduating from Harvard, Ganong was appointed an assistant instructor in botany there. He stayed at Harvard for a few years until May 1894, when he accepted an appointment as Professor of Botany at Smith College. It was a position he would fill for 36 years. He was also director of the Botanic Garden at Smith. Ganong, was responsible for developing the Garden, which had been laid out by Frederick Law Olmsted in 1893. Ganong expanded and revised Olmsted's planting specifications to make the entire campus an arboretum, and they reworked the herbaceous beds as a "systematics garden" after the Engler-Prantl classification system. The outdoor environment at Smith thus became (and remains) a place of learning for students of botany and horticulture.

The greenhouses at Smith College date from Ganong's tenure there, beginning in 1894.

By authoring several books including The Teaching Botanist, A Laboratory Manual for Plant Physiology, The Living Plant, and A Textbook of Botany for Colleges, Ganong was able to establish and maintain an international reputation in botany. Under his administration, Smith's Botany department reached a peak in student enrollment, size of staff, and number of courses. He ensured that the range and quality of equipment available to students was high, and the department was able to attain a positive academic reputation. Enrollment in the introductory elective class peaked at 182 in 1926. Ganong retired from Smith College in 1932.

He was elected President of the Botanical Society of America in 1907.

== Historian and cartographer ==
Ganong undertook historical work during his teaching career. In summers, he would return to New Brunswick to study and document the historical geography of the province. Among his surveys were St. Croix Island, site of Champlain's first settlement in North America in 1604.

He acquired a working knowledge of the Maliseet and Mi'kmaq languages, and with that understanding and consultation with linguists and native historians, he undertook an investigation of the aboriginal place names in the Maritime Provinces, publishing a series of six articles in the Transactions of the Royal Society of Canada between 1911 and 1928. In 1889 he presented a paper on the cartography of the Gulf of Saint Lawrence from the 1530s to 1604. Later, in the 1930s, he published an additional nine articles in the Transactions on what he termed the crucial maps in the early cartography and place-nomenclature of the region. The articles were drawn together and published in book form by the University of Toronto Press in 1964. His work on place-nomenclature is still widely referenced. In his explorations, he also had a chance to name several geographical features in the largely unexplored central and northern parts of New Brunswick, including Mount Carleton, the highest summit in the province, which he named after the first Lieutenant-Governor of New Brunswick, Thomas Carleton. Another mountain to the north of Mount Carleton was named for Ganong in 1901 by his friend and naturalist Mauran Furbish.

As a scientist, Ganong brought a special quality to the study of New Brunswick history, which featured an emphasis on map-based studies and in determining the exact location of key historic sites. He actually went to the places he wrote about. As a translator and editor of the 17th-century Acadian narratives of Nicolas Denys and Father Chrétien Le Clercq he became a foremost scholar of the Acadian period. He frequently contributed articles on Samuel de Champlain to publications of the New Brunswick Historical Society, the New Brunswick Magazine and Acadiensis. In addition to document-based research and translation, Ganong prepared maps, took photographs and gave slide presentations. He often collaborated with others. One frequent collaborator was John Clarence Webster, for whom he prepared numerous maps and other contributions. He also took a great interest in the international border between New Brunswick and Maine. Because of this interest and expertise he was asked to take part in the cross-border tercentennial celebrations on the St. Croix River in 1904. In 1918, Ganong completed the translation of Volume III of Champlain's Voyages, part of a major publication of Champlain's writings by the Champlain Society. He was also the first to pose a scientific explanation for the often sighted Ghost Ship of Northumberland Strait suggesting it was an electrical illusion.

William F. Ganong's efforts also formed a substantial basis for the establishment of the New Brunswick Museum and archives.

Ganong died at his summer home outside Saint John in 1941. He was 77.

== Honours ==
- PhD, University of New Brunswick, 1898
- LLD, University of New Brunswick, 1920
- Fellow of the Royal Society of Canada
- William Ganong Hall, Science Building on the Saint John Campus of the University of New Brunswick is named after him.
- Ganong Mountain in northern New Brunswick was named for him in 1901.

== Publications ==
=== Botany ===
- The Teaching Botanist (Macmillan, 1899)
- A Laboratory Manual for Plant Physiology (1901)
- The Living Plant (1913)
- A textbook of botany for colleges (1917 and later editions)

=== History and geography (partial list) ===
- A Genealogy of the New Brunswick Branch of the Descendants of Thomas Ganong (1893)
- "A Monograph on the Place - Nomenclature of the Province of New Brunswick", in Transactions of the Royal Society of Canada (1896)
- "A Monograph of Historic Sites in the Province of New Brunswick", in Transactions of the Royal Society of Canada, Section II (1899)
- "Additions and Corrections to Monographs on the Place - Nomenclature, Cartography, Historic Sites, Boundaries and Settlement - origins of the Province of New Brunswick", Transactions of the Royal Society of Canada (1906).
- "The Identity of Plants and Animals mentioned by the Early Voyages to Eastern Canada and Newfoundland" in Transactions of the Royal Society of Canada (1909)
- The Description and Natural History of the Coast of North America(Acadia) by Nicolas Denys Translator (Toronto, 1908)
- Le Clercq: New Relation of Gaspesia Editor (Toronto, 1910)
- An Organization of the Scientific Investigation of the Indian Place-Nomenclature of the Maritime Provinces of Canada, (3 volumes 1911-13)
- "Ste. Croix (Dochet) Island A Monograph", from Transactions of the Royal Society of Canada, Second series - 1902-1903, Volume VIII, Section II. Edited by Susan Brittain Ganong, B.Sc., LL.D., Monographic Series No. 3, The New Brunswick Museum, Saint John, N.B. (1945).
- The History of Miscou and Shippegan (1946)
- Champlain's Island: An Expanded Edition of Ste. Croix (Dochet) Island (1945, Reprinted 2004) ISBN 0-919326-57-9
- The History of Caraquet and Pokemouche, Revised and Enlarged from the Author's Manuscript Notes, edited by Susan Brittain Ganong. (Historical Studies No.6. New Brunswick Museum (1948)
- The history of Miscou, Tracadie, Pokemouche, Caraquet, Tabusintac, [Shippegan], Neguac and Burnt Church: Settlements in the Province of New Brunswick
- Catalogue of the Maps in the Collection of the Geographic Board, (Ottawa: January, 1949)
- Crucial Maps in the Early Cartography and Place-nomenclature of the Atlantic Coast of Canada (Royal Society of Canada and the University of Toronto Press, 1964).
- A Monograph of the Evolution of the Boundaries of the Province of New Brunswick (Ottawa: J. Hope, 1901)

== Sources ==
- Rees, Ronald (2016). New Brunswick Was His Country: The Life of William Francis Ganong. Halifax, Nova Scotia: Nimbus Publishing. ISBN 9781771084482.
