= Susan B. Ganong =

Susan Brittain Ganong
- Born: March 18, 1873; Carleton, New Brunswick, Canada
- Died: April 29, 1961 (aged 88); Rothesay, New Brunswick, Canada
- Resting place: St. Stephen Rural Cemetery
- Education: New Brunswick Normal School; Smith College
- Occupation: Educator
- Board member of: Proprietor & Chairperson, Netherwood School
- Parent(s): James Harvey Ganong & Susan E. Brittain

Susan Brittain Ganong B.Sc., LLD (March 18, 1873 – April 29, 1961) was a widely respected Canadian educator and proprietor of the Netherwood School for girls in the Province of New Brunswick.

She was born in Carleton, New Brunswick (now West Saint John), and was known in the family as "Suzie" in order to distinguish her from her mother with the same first name. Her family moved to the town of St. Stephen where her father and uncle Gilbert founded the Ganong Bros. chocolate company. Susan Ganong is the sister of businessmen Edwin and Arthur, and to botanist and educator William. Her sister Kit married Howard P. Whidden, Chancellor of McMaster University in Ontario.

Susan Ganong graduated from St. Stephen High School and obtained her teaching certificate from the Normal School in Fredericton. She earned a Bachelor of Science degree from Smith College in Northampton, Massachusetts, where her brother William was a professor.

Ganong taught school in her hometown for three years and taught science for four years at Halifax Ladies' College in Halifax, Nova Scotia. In 1903, she joined the faculty of the Netherwood School, an exclusive private school for girls in Rothesay, New Brunswick. At the time, the school was in severe difficulty and had less than ten students but as co-principal with Miss Ethelwyn Pitcher, she took over the lease of the building and implemented ideas and improvements so that by 1905 enrollment had increased to thirty-three students. In 1912, Susan Ganong purchased the facility, expanding its facilities further and increasing the School's emphasis on academic excellence to a point where the school gained a reputation internationally as school of high scholastic standing. She advanced the learning of music and art and arranged for musicians, artists, and art exhibitions to appear at the school. She also put in place a program for the teaching of the French language, a pioneering effort in a very English institution designed to develop an understanding between Canada's two founding cultures.

Outside of her school, Ganong was active in the YWCA organization and the New Brunswick Museum. In 1943, she received an honorary Doctor of Laws Degree from the University of New Brunswick as an acknowledgment of her substantial contributions to education in the province of New Brunswick. After leading the Netherwood School for forty-one years, in 1944 Dr. Ganong sold the institution to the Netherwood Foundation Limited. Although retired, she resided in her cottage on the school's grounds for the remainder of her life. In 1952, she published A Sketch of Life at Netherwood, the Rothesay School for Girls.

Susan Ganong died on April 29, 1961, in Rothesay and was buried with family members in the St. Stephen Rural Cemetery. The Netherwood School offers the Dr. Susan B. Ganong Memorial Scholarship and the Susan B. Ganong Theater, built in 1997, was named in her memory. Her portrait by Kenneth Forbes hangs in the dining hall at the school.
