= David A. Ganong =

- Born: September 14, 1943 (age 82); St. Stephen, New Brunswick; Canada
- Education: University of New Brunswick, University of Western Ontario
- Occupation: Businessman
- Board member of: Canadian Council of Chief Executive Officers; Board of Governors, University of New Brunswick; Sun Life Financial; Conference Board of Canada; North American Competitiveness Council
- Spouse: Diane (Simpson)
- Children: Bryana, Aaron, Nicholas
- Parent(s): Philip D. Ganong & Margaret R. Alison

David Alison Ganong CM (born 14 September 1943) is a Canadian business executive.

== Biography ==
Ganong is the former president and current chairman of the board of Ganong Bros., the oldest chocolate manufacturing company in Canada. He graduated with a BA degree from the University of New Brunswick in 1965 then earned his MBA degree University of Western Ontario.

In 1977 he replaced his uncle, R. Whidden Ganong, as president of the company. In 1984–85, David Ganong served as chairman of the Atlantic Provinces Economic Council. In 1990 he oversaw the building of a modern new plant. Its success was followed by a further expansion in 2003. He was named a member of the Order of Canada in 2005 and was inducted into the Canadian Professional Sales Association Hall of Fame in 1999. In 2008 David Ganong stepped down as president, but has maintained an advisory role as chairman on the company's board and remains the controlling shareholder. Two of his children have moved into executive positions with the company, representing the fifth generation of Ganong overseeing the company; daughter Bryana Ganong, as president and CEO, and son Nicholas Ganong as Vice President of Sales and Business Development.

David Ganong is a member of the board of governors of the University of New Brunswick and he and his wife Diane have provided financial support to the university. In recent years, David has taken an active role in a number of community development groups, most recently with Future St. Stephen.

== Notes ==
- Folster, David. The Chocolate Ganongs of St. Stephen, New Brunswick (1991) Goose Lane Editions ISBN 0-86492-115-2
- Craigs, Melodie. Ganong, The Candy Family (1984) Literacy Council of Fredericton ISBN 0-920333-16-8
- David and Diane Ganong's donation to the University of New Brunswick
- February 2003 Candy Industry article on David Ganong and Ganong Bros.
- Profile of David Ganong, The Governor General's Canadian Leadership Conference
