= Mesa Citrus Growers Association =

Business association

The Mesa Citrus Growers Association is a citrus growers association located in Mesa, Arizona. It was founded in the 1920s to take advantage of the growing citrus industry in the region. During this time, it partnered with Sunkist Growers, Incorporated, in a building that operated until 2010.
