= St. Stephen Rural Cemetery =

- Interactive map of St. Stephen Rural Cemetery

Details
- Established: 1856
- Location: St. Stephen, New Brunswick
- Country: Canada
- Coordinates: 45.120042°N 67.180208°W
- Type: Public
- Owned by: Municipality
- Size: 65 acres (260,000 m^{2})
- No. of graves: 12,000+
- Find a Grave: St. Stephen Rural Cemetery

St. Stephen Rural Cemetery is a municipal cemetery established in April 1856 at the town of St. Stephen, New Brunswick, Canada. The cemetery encompasses 65 acres (260,000 m^{2}) of land with approximately 12,000 burials. There are over 20 kilometres of avenues and paths.

== History ==
St. Stephen is a Canada/United States border town, separated by the St. Croix River. It is a place where crossing the bridge for employment, shopping, hospitalization, or just visiting friends, is an almost daily part of normal life. The two close-knit communities have shared services for more than two hundred years. Until nearly the second half of the 20th century, a number of Americans were born in St. Stephen and vice versa.

Cross-border marriages have been common and there are several American Civil War veterans buried in the St. Stephen cemetery, including a Medal of Honor recipient as well as Brigadier-General John Curtis Caldwell who was one of the eight generals to accompany the body of assassinated President Abraham Lincoln on its journey from Washington D.C. to Lincoln's home in Springfield, Illinois. Many members of the Ganong family of chocolate makers are interred here.

== Notable interments ==
- John Curtis Caldwell, Brigadier-General, Union Army
- Arthur D. Ganong, businessman, president of Ganong Bros.
- Gilbert W. Ganong, co-founder of Ganong Bros.
- Hardy N. Ganong (CBE), Major-General, Canadian Army
- J. Edwin Ganong, businessman, co-founder of Ganong Bros. and the St. Croix Soap Mfg. Co.
- R. Whidden Ganong, businessman, president of Ganong Bros.
- Susan B. Ganong, educator, owner of Netherwood School
- William Francis Ganong, botanist, historian, cartographer
- James Mitchell, Premier of New Brunswick
- Horatio Young, US Navy, Medal of Honor recipient
