= Shalom Zachar =

Gathering in Ashkenazi Jewish circles on the first Friday night after a baby boy is born

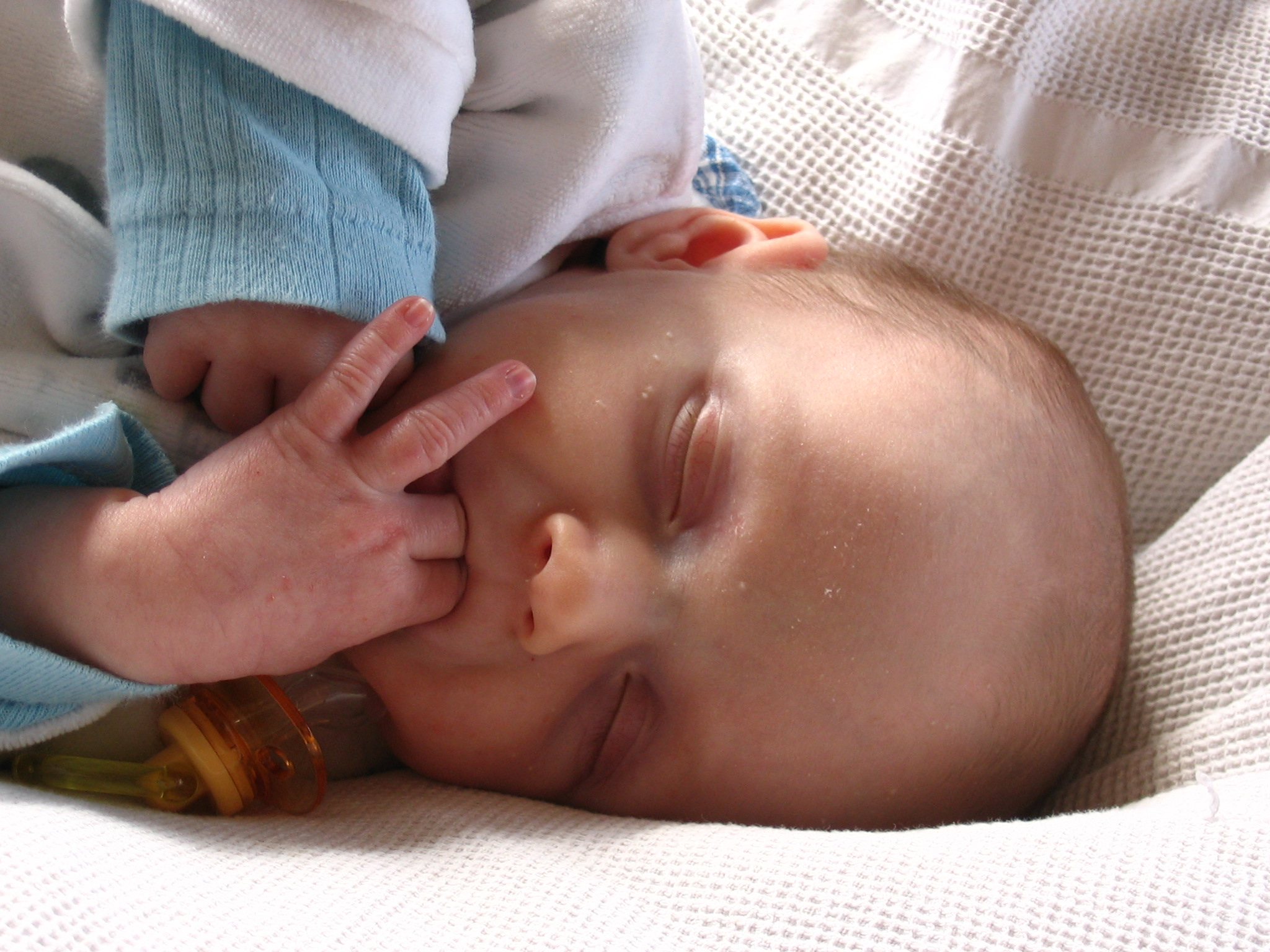
- A Shalom Zachar is celebrated on the first Friday night after the birth of a baby boy

Halakhic texts relating to this article
- Babylonian Talmud: Niddah 30b
- Shulchan Aruch: Rema: Yoreh De'ah 265:12
- Other rabbinic codes: Taz: Yoreh De'ah 265:13; Terumat HaDeshen 269; Zocher HaBris 3:6; Kitzur Shulchan Aruch 163:8

A Shalom Zachar (also: Sholom Zochor, Shulem Zucher, Hebrew: שלום זכר; trans. Welcoming the male; lit. Peace be upon the male) is a gathering which takes place in Ashkenazi Jewish circles on the first Friday night after a baby boy is born. Although intended to "console" the newborn, the get-together is treated as a happy occasion.

== Sources ==
The practice has been codified by Moses Isserles in Shulchan Aruch, Yoreh De'ah 265:12:

It is customary to make a festive meal on the Friday night after the birth of a baby boy. People go to the house where the baby is, to taste something [there], and this [eating] is also [considered] a seudat mitzvah.

David HaLevi Segal, a major commentator on the Shulchan Aruch, finds the source for the above statement in the Talmudic tractate of Niddah (30b). Here the Talmud states that while a baby develops within the womb, "he is taught the entire Torah. However, as soon as he enters the air of this world, an angel comes and strikes him on his mouth, causing him to forget the entire Torah" (Taz, Yoreh Deah 265:13). Because the baby forgot all the Torah he learned, he is likened to a mourner. Just as people visit a mourner in his home to comfort him during the mourning period, people visit the home of the newborn to console him for the Torah he has forgotten.

Rabbi Yaakov Emden writes that this meal is called a Seudat Zachar (Meal of Remembrance), and is held specifically on Shabbat because that day is also connected with remembrance, as the Torah states, "Remember the Shabbat day to sanctify it" (Exodus 20:8).

The Terumat HaDeshen (269) and Kitzur Shulchan Aruch (163:8) consider the Shalom Zachar a Seudat mitzvah.

== Customs ==
In current practice, the Shalom Zachar is an informal, drop-in gathering which takes place after the Friday night meal. The location of the gathering is determined by where the father of the new baby spends Shabbat, since he presides over the event. Thus, a Shalom Zachar usually takes place in the home of the newborn (even if the newborn is still in the hospital), although it may also take place at the home of grandparents, in-laws, or even friends with whom the father is spending Shabbat.

Typically, mainly men and boys drop by to convey their congratulations, eat, to share words of Torah, and to sing songs welcoming the newborn and thanking God for the birth. If the mother is already back home with the baby, female relatives or friends will usually drop by to visit her as well.

Chickpeas are customarily served because they are a round-shaped food eaten by mourners (as they symbolize the cyclical nature of life).

A Shalom Zachar is not held when this Friday night coincides with the night of Yom Kippur or the night of the Passover Seder. Yom Kippur is a fast day, and therefore all eating and drinking is forbidden. On the night of the Passover Seder, it is forbidden to eat anything after eating the afikomen, which is eaten at the end of the meal. If the Shalom Zachar falls on a Friday night during any other day of Passover, matzah cakes and potato-flour cookies will be served instead of regular flour cakes and cookies.

== Brit Yitzchak ==
Sephardic Jews do not hold a Shalom Zachar. Instead, their custom is to conduct a gathering called a Brit Yitzchak on the evening preceding the newborn boy's brit milah.
