= Chicken Bones =

Confectionery product

Chicken Bones is a line of candy products manufactured by Ganong Bros. of St. Stephen, New Brunswick, and available in Canada. A pink cinnamon-flavoured candy with a chocolate filling, it is considered a traditional treat among Atlantic Canadians during Christmas. Due to its popularity, it is the sole remaining hard candy manufactured by the company.

Chicken Bones was created in 1885 by Frank Sparhawk, a candy maker from Baltimore who took a Ganong Bros. job opening. The original manufacturing method continues to be used.

These candies are used by New Brunswick brewer Moonshine Creek Distilleries to make Chicken-Bones-flavoured liqueur.
