= Evan M. Whidden =

Canadian minister and academic

- Born: 9 July 1898; Galt, Ontario, Canada
- Died: 11 March 1980 (aged 81); Cornwall, Ontario, Canada
- Occupations: minister and academic
- Father: Howard P. Whidden
- Relatives: James H. Ganong (maternal grandfather)

Evan McDonald Whidden (9 July 1898 - 11 March 1980) was a Canadian Christian minister and academic whose career included being President of Brandon College, Dean of Theology at Acadia University, and chairman of the founding conference of the Atlantic Ecumenical Council. An annual scholarship is awarded at Acadia University in his honor.

He was the son of Howard Primrose and Katherine Louise (Ganong) Whidden, and married Frances Margaret Billington in 1941.

Evan was listed in the Canadian Who’s Who in 1951.

Evan and Frances had three children: Howard John born 22 June 1943, Roberta "Robie" Katherine born 13 March 1945 who resided in San Francisco, California and Eric Christopher born 5 March 1947 who resides in Orlando, Florida. They also had four granddaughters: Elinor Whidden (b.1976), Margaret Whidden (b.1978), Erica Whidden (b.1978) and Hilary Whidden (b.1980).

== Career ==
- 1915-1918 World War I, CFA, CEF, France
- 1921 educated in Brandon College, Brandon, Manitoba BA
- 1921 Reabow, Ontario
- 1921-1933 Tabernacle Church, Winnipeg, Manitoba
- 1925 McMaster University, Toronto, Ontario MA
- 1925 Palmerston, Ontario
- 1928 Yale Divinity School, New Haven, Connecticut, BD
- 1928-1935 student pastorates, east end, Saskatoon, Saskatchewan
- 1934 General Ministry Association, Winnipeg, Manitoba
- 1935-1936 Edinburgh University, Edinburgh, Scotland
- 1936 professor of theology and head of department, Brandon College, Brandon, Manitoba, where he was college president for a time
- circa 1951 Dean of Theology, Acadia University, Wolfville, Nova Scotia; retired 1967.

== Books ==
Evan was the author of:

- Whidden, Evan M. (c. 1969). Pilgrimage from yesterday : lessons from history for Atlantic United Baptists. Saint John, N.B.: Union Jubilee Committee, United Baptist Convention of the Atlantic Provinces. pp. [37] p., 23 cm.
- Whidden, Evan M. (c. 1965). A philosophy of higher education as functioning in a Christian university. Wolfville, N.S.: Acadia University. pp. 63 leaves, 28 cm.
