= K.C. Irving Hall =

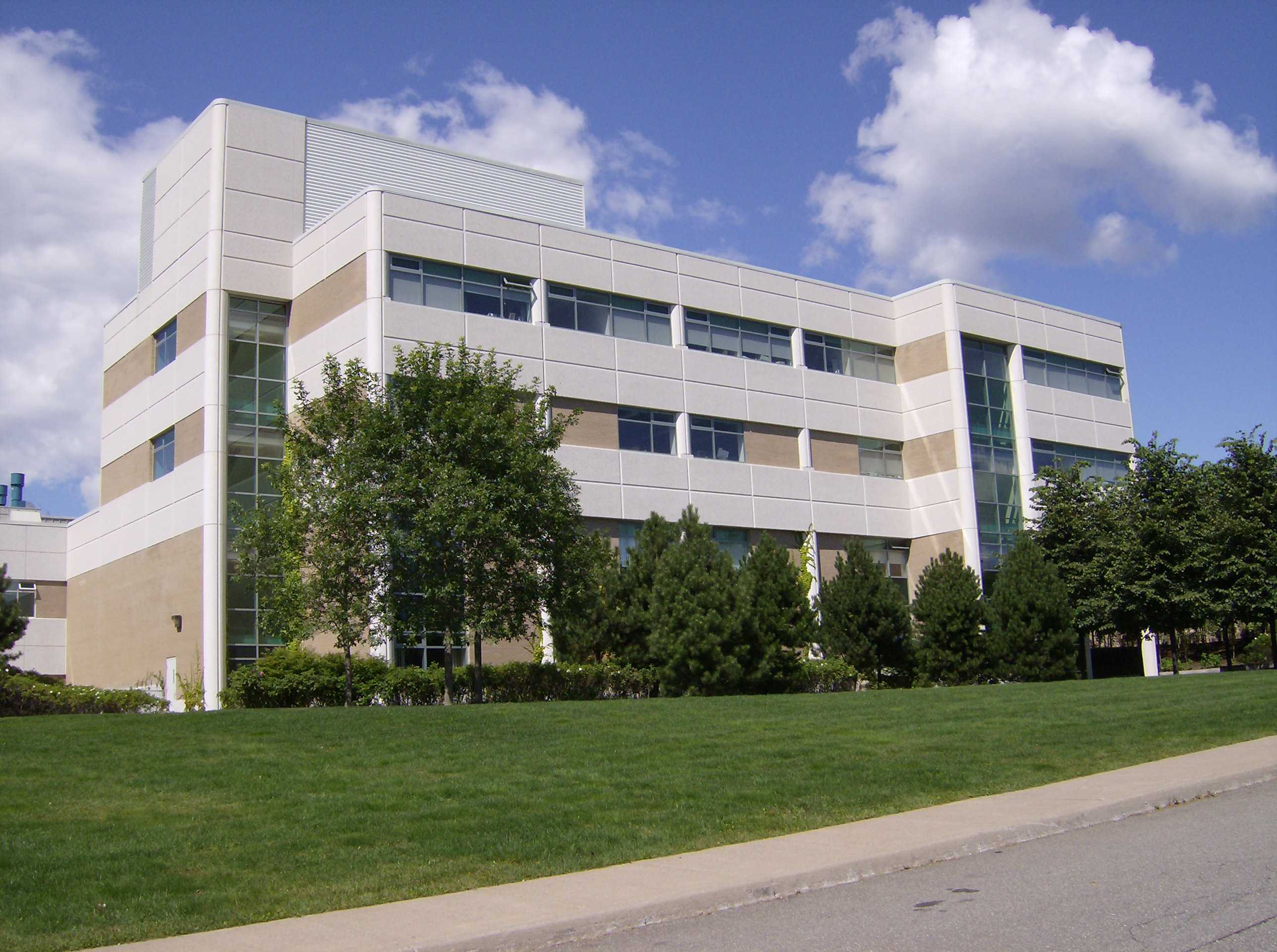
- Interactive map of the K.C. Irving Hall area
- Alternative names: Irving Hall

General information
- Location: 100 Tucker Park Road, Saint John, New Brunswick, Canada
- Coordinates: 45.3054°N 66.0846°W
- Current tenants: Faculty of Science, Applied Science & Engineering
- Construction started: October 1997
- Completed: 1998
- Cost: CA$5.3 million
- Owner: University of New Brunswick

Technical details
- Floor count: 4
- Floor area: 40,000 sq ft (3,700 m^{2})

Design and construction
- Architect: DFS Inc.

K.C. Irving Hall, or simply known as Irving Hall, is a building located on the Saint John campus of the University of New Brunswick (UNB). It primarily houses the Engineering, Biology, and Nursing departments at the campus and is attached to William Ganong Hall.

== Description ==
The building houses the Engineering, Biology, and Nursing departments, and includes various classrooms and conference rooms as well as two computer labs. It is named after businessman K. C. Irving.

== History ==
Construction on K.C. Irving Hall began in October 1997, with a sod turning ceremony taking place on October 16. The building was planned to have four floors with a total space area of 40,000 square feet (3,700 m^{2}). Funding for the building, which cost CA$5.3 million, largely came from the Irving family, UNB, and the provincial government, with extra donations coming from several municipal governments and individual contributions. The hall opened for use in December 1998.

Between 2005 and 2006, K.C. Irving Hall was expanded to further house a research facility for the Canadian Rivers Institute. The facility opened in October 2006.
