= The Botanic Garden of Smith College =

Park and gardens in Massachusetts, US

Coordinates: 42.3189°N 72.6401°W

- Interactive map of The Botanic Garden of Smith College
- Website: Official website

The Botanic Garden of Smith College is located on the campus of Smith College, in Northampton, Massachusetts, United States. It consists of a fine selection of woody trees, shrubs, herbaceous plants, and an excellent collection of tropical and subtropical plants in The Lyman Conservatory (greenhouses in the Lyman Plant House). All are open to the public.

== History ==
The first outlines of the Botanic Garden began in the 1880s, when Smith College hired the firm of Olmsted, Olmsted and Eliot to develop a campus landscape plan. Frederick Law Olmsted, senior member of the firm, is best remembered for designing Central Park in New York City and the Boston park system. The Olmsted plan dated February 1893 includes curving drives and walkways, open spaces with specimen trees, and vistas over Paradise Pond through wooded groves.

As part of the 1893 plan, Olmsted provided planting lists of diverse trees, shrubs, herbs, and aquatic and marsh plants. He collaborated with landscape architect Elizabeth Jane Bullard, who would oversee the initial planting of over 1,200 trees and shrubs.

In a more formal sense, however, the Botanic Garden of Smith College took shape under William Francis Ganong, appointed professor of botany and director of the Botanic Garden in May 1894, and Edward J. Canning, hired in summer 1894 as head gardener.

== Collections ==
Smith's Botanic Garden collection includes 1200 types of woody trees and shrubs, 2200 types of hardy herbaceous plants, 3200 types of tender herbaceous and woody plants in greenhouses, and 6600 different kinds of plants, giving a total of approximately 10,000 types of plants on campus.

== Features ==
The first greenhouse at Smith College was constructed in 1893.

The Lyman Conservatory's greenhouses with 12,000 square feet (1,100 m^{2}) date from 1895, housing over 2500 species of plants for the instruction of Smith students in the plant sciences. These plants are selected from a wide variety of families and habitats; they comprise one of the best collections of tropical, subtropical, and desert plants in the country.

The campus arboretum consists of 127 acres (51 ha) of woody trees and shrubs and is free and open every day.

Other Smith Campus Gardens include the Rock Garden, Japanese Garden, Happy Chace '28 Garden, Capen Garden, Woodland Garden, and Systematics Garden & Perennial Border.

== See also ==
- List of botanical gardens in the United States
