= James H. Ganong =

- James Harvey Ganong, c.1880
- Born: January 9, 1841; Springfield, New Brunswick
- Died: April 21, 1888 (aged 47); St. Stephen, New Brunswick; Canada
- Resting place: St. Stephen Rural Cemetery
- Occupation: Businessman
- Spouse: Susan E. Brittain (1841-1927)
- Children: William, Edwin, Ethan, Katherine, Susan, Arthur, Walter

James Harvey Ganong (January 9, 1841 – April 21, 1888) was a Canadian businessman in St. Stephen, New Brunswick who co-founded Ganong Bros. chocolate making company in 1873 and the St. Croix Soap Manufacturing Co. in 1878.

== Biography ==
Born in Springfield, New Brunswick, James was the eldest of the six children of Francis Daniel Ganong and Deborah Ruth Keirstead. His father was a farmer and a merchant. As a young man, James worked as a shopkeeper and as a traveling salesman. In 1863, he married Susan E. Brittain of Carleton, New Brunswick with whom he had seven children. He lived in Massachusetts for a few years where two of his children were born.

In 1873, he and his brother Gilbert moved to the border town of St. Stephen on the St. Croix River across from Calais, Maine. There, they established a grocery business and within a few years added a bakery and confectionery manufactory, and eventually expanded their retailing to include a store in Calais.

Following the success of their grocery business, in 1878 the brothers, in partnership with Freeman H. Todd, built the St. Croix Soap Manufacturing Company. In 1884 they elected to dissolve this partnership. Gilbert Ganong retained the store, bakery, and confectionery business while James took over the soap factory.

James Ganong was actively involved in community affairs and served as mayor of St. Stephen. He died unexpectedly in 1888 at the age of forty-seven, at which point his son, Edwin, took over the running of the soap business. Gilbert Ganong died without issue and James's son Arthur would take over the chocolate business.
