= William Ganong Hall =

- Interactive map of the William Ganong Hall area
- Alternative names: Ganong Hall

General information
- Location: 100 Tucker Park Road, Saint John, New Brunswick, Canada
- Coordinates: 45.3054°N 66.0846°W
- Current tenants: Faculty of Science (Biology, Chemistry, Geology, Physics)
- Construction started: 1968
- Completed: 1969
- Owner: University of New Brunswick

Technical details
- Floor count: 4

Design and construction
- Architects: Mott Myles & Chatwin

William Ganong Hall, or simply known as Ganong Hall, is a building located on the Saint John campus of the University of New Brunswick (UNB). It primarily houses facilities for the Biology, Chemistry, Geology, and Physics departments at the campus and is attached to K.C. Irving Hall.

== Description ==
William Ganong Hall was one of the University of New Brunswick's first three buildings constructed on the Saint John / Tucker Park campus (UNBSJ). Plans for the buildings' construction started being announced in early 1967, with Mott, Myles & Chatwin being selected as architects. In April 1968, a 25-year-old carpenter was killed in a workplace accident during construction. William Ganong Hall houses the Biology, Chemistry, Geology, and Physics at the campus. The building has four total floors, a lecture theater, as well as a greenhouse facility attached. Constructed in 1968, the building was named after William Francis Ganong, a botanist and historian from the province.
