= Pal-o-mine =

Canadian chocolate bar

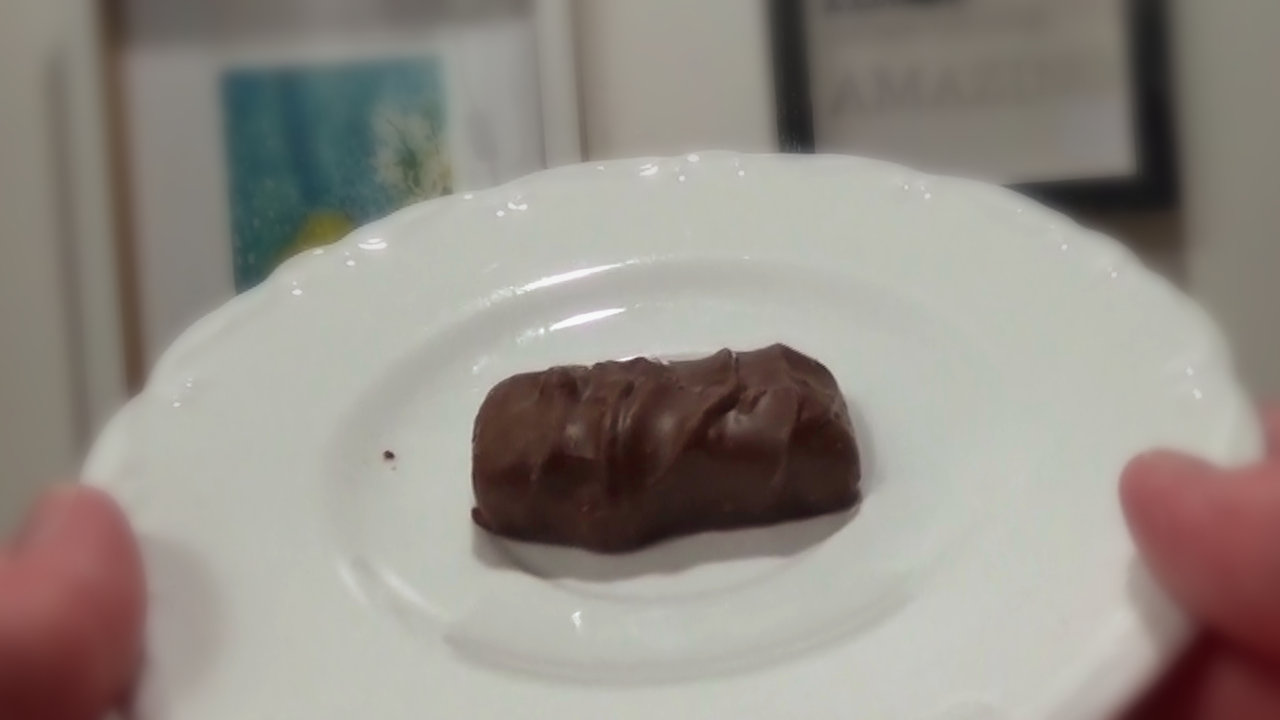
An unwrapped Pal-O-Mine bar.

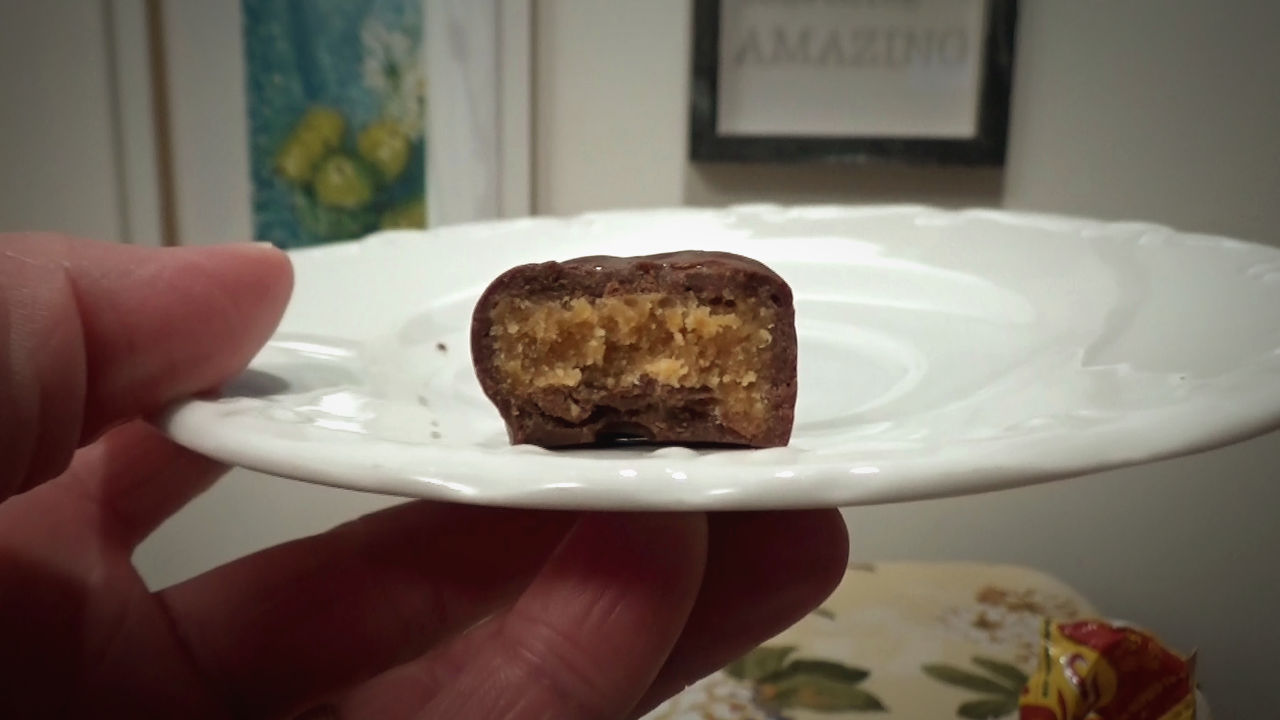
The interior of a Pal-O-Mine bar.

Pal-o-Mine is a Canadian chocolate bar which consists of a peanut & fudge middle covered in dark chocolate. It is produced by Ganong Bros. in St. Stephen, New Brunswick, Canada.

It is considered to be one of the oldest continuously-produced chocolate bars in North America.

== History ==
When chocolatier George Ensor and businessman Arthur Ganong would embark on fishing expeditions, they would take chunks of chocolate along in their pockets. They found that the chocolate would melt in their pockets and make a mess, so they began wrapping bars of chocolate in cellophane. In 1898, Ganong started selling individually-wrapped chocolate bars, the first company to do so in North America.

In 1910, Ganong added nuts to their chocolate bars, and they adopted the name "Pal-o-Mine" in 1920. According to one version of the story, Ganong and Ensor would give the leftover chocolate to local children, and one girl would respond each time by declaring "you’re a pal of mine."

In 2021, Ganong temporarily halted production of the Pal-o-Mine in order to enhance the bar's formula and install new equipment at the factory. When the product reappeared in stores in 2022, some consumers voiced their displeasure with the new formula.
