= Pekalach =

Jewish ritual treat

Pekalach (meaning "small bags" in Yiddish), also known as caladman in Hebrew, are small bags containing sweets, which according to Jewish tradition are thrown at the groom (Choson) at an aufruf, or distributed at a vach nacht, upsherin, and sometimes at a bar mitzvah or bat mitzvah.
