= Ganong's Review of Medical Physiology =

Textbook of Physiology

Ganong's Review of Medical Physiology is a textbook in Physiology originally written by William Francis Ganong. The first edition was published in 1963, and the latest, 26th, edition was published in 2019, more than fifty years later than the first. The current edition consists of seven sections and written by Kim E. Barrett, Susan M. Barman, Heddwen L. Brooks and Jason X.-J. Yuan.

After a lecture, Ganong offered medical students 25 cents for each mistake that they could find from his book. He nearly went broke paying them off. He always carried index cards and noted new informations he found out to keep his textbook remarkably up-to-date.
