= Arthur D. Ganong =

Canadian politician

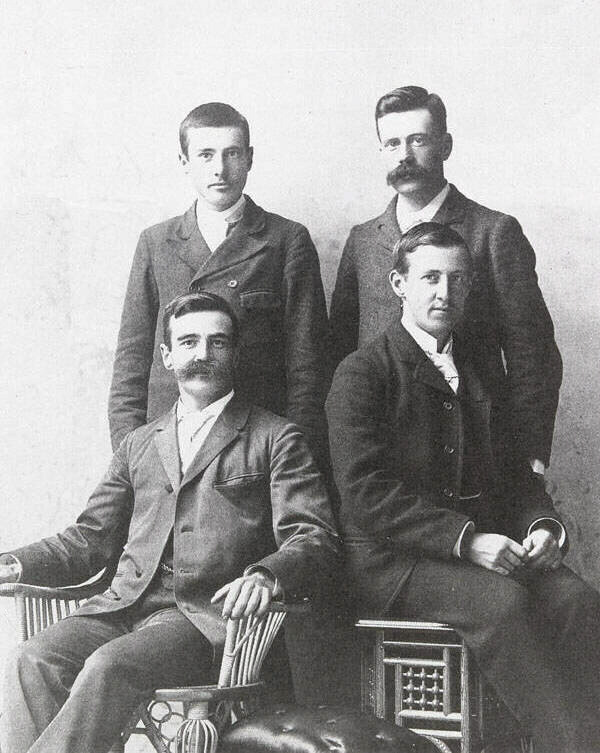
- Sons of James H. Ganong, 1895; Walter and Edwin (standing), William and Arthur (seated)
- Born: August 3, 1877; St. Stephen, New Brunswick; Canada
- Died: November, 1960 (aged 83); Saint John, New Brunswick; Canada
- Resting place: St. Stephen Rural Cemetery
- Occupations: Businessman, politician
- Political party: Progressive Conservative
- Board member of: New Brunswick Telephone Co. Ltd., Canadian Manufacturer's Association; President, Maritime Board of Trade; Senate of the University of New Brunswick; President, New Brunswick and Canada Railway Co.
- Spouse: Berla Frances Whidden
- Children: Carmen, Whidden, Philip D., Joan
- Parent(s): James Harvey Ganong & Susan E. Brittain

Arthur Deinstadt Ganong (August 3, 1877 – November 1960) was a Canadian businessman and politician. He was born in St. Stephen, New Brunswick into a chocolate making family and would serve as president of Ganong Bros. Limited from 1917 to 1957. He was known for eating several pounds of chocolate a day.

He was the sixth of the seven children of James Harvey Ganong and Susan E. Brittan. His father and his uncle, Gilbert, founded the chocolate-making company in 1873. Among his siblings are educator Susie, businessman Edwin, botanist William, and Kit Ganong Whidden.

On 8 June 1904, Arthur Ganong married Berla Frances Whidden (1878–1958) of Grand Manan, New Brunswick. The couple had four children.

Ganong worked all his life in the family business and took over as its head from his Uncle Gilbert who died without issue. Arthur Ganong and company employee George Ensor developed a chocolate bar to take along on their fishing trips and in 1910 the company introduced Pal-o-Mine, the first 5-cent chocolate nut bar in North America.

== Political life ==
In the 1930 Canadian federal election, Ganong was elected the Conservative member of parliament for the Charlotte riding, serving until 1935.

== Curling ==
A fan and enthusiastic participant in the sport of curling, Arthur Ganong helped build the town's first curling rink. In 1930 he donated a trophy to the winner of the provincial curling championship that bore his name for the next fifty years.

Arthur Ganong died in 1960 and was interred in the St. Stephen Rural Cemetery. Following its formation in 1979, he was posthumously inducted into the Canadian Business Hall of Fame.

== Electoral results ==
1930 Canadian federal election: Charlotte
Party	Candidate	Votes	%	±%
Conservative	Arthur D. Ganong	5,595	57.8	+0.3
Liberal	John Scovil	4,092	42.2	-0.3
Total valid votes		9,687	100.0	
Source(s) "Charlotte, New Brunswick (1867-08-06 - 1968-04-22)". History of Federal Ridings Since 1867. Library of Parliament.

Parliament of Canada
Preceded by Robert W. Grimmer	Charlotte; 1930-1935	Succeeded by Burton M. Hill
