= Sunkist Fun Fruits =

Snack food brand

Sunkist Fun Fruits were a licensed snack food from Leaf Confections Limited which were manufactured with fruit from Sunkist Growers, Incorporated. and packaged by Thomas J. Lipton. These bite-sized fruit snacks, which were introduced in 1987, were small, soft and pellet shaped, rather like jellybeans. Initially, the confection was available in four flavors: cherry, grape, orange and strawberry. Later that same year, it was available in assorted shapes such as dinosaurs and rock 'n' roll shapes in order to appeal to children.

With the dismantling of Leaf Confections, Sunkist has currently licensed the production of fruit snacks to the Ben Myerson Candy Company for Sunkist Fruit Gems and General Mills, Inc. for Sunkist Fruit Snacks. In Canada, an additional brand, Sunkist First Fruit Snacks is manufactured by Ganong Bros. Limited.

== Advertising ==
Advertising on television and comic books for Fun Fruits usually featured characters named "Tickle Trees" who would cause those who approached them to laugh uncontrollably. These trees, according to the advertising, produced fruits good enough to be used for Fun Fruits. Advertising for the dinosaur shapes featured the "Fruitasaurus," a friendly Brontosaurus who stockpiled dinosaur shaped Fun Fruits.
