= Beecher-McFadden Estate =

Historic house in New York, United States

- U.S. National Register of Historic Places
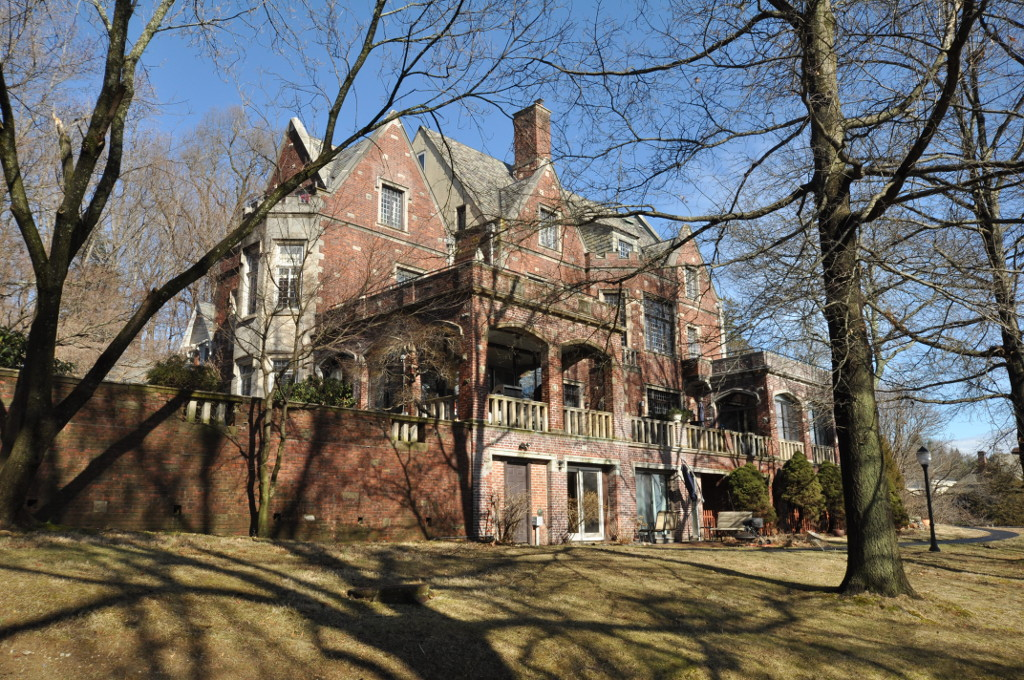

- Location within New York Location within the United States
- Location: E. Main St., Peekskill, New York
- Coordinates: 41°17′54″N 73°53′44″W
- Area: 4 acres (1.6 ha)
- Built: c. 1875
- Architectural style: Tudor Revival, Jacobethan Revival
- NRHP reference No.: 87001894
- Added to NRHP: November 2, 1987

The Beecher-McFadden Estate is a historic estate located on East Main Street in Peekskill, Westchester County, New York.

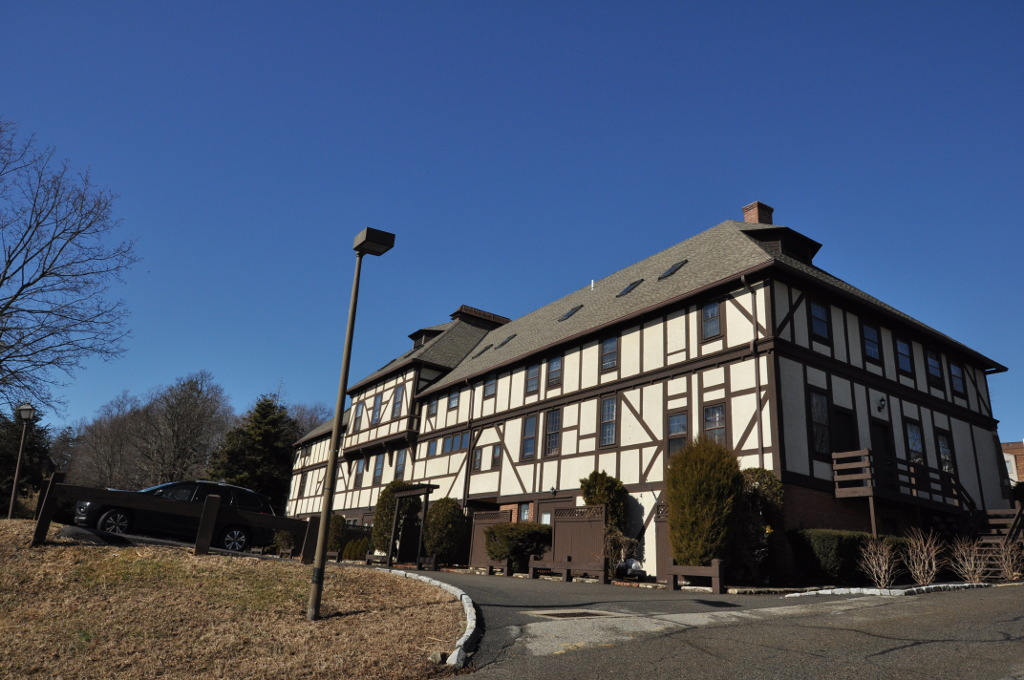
Beecher Estate former Carriage House

== Description and history ==
The estate includes an imposing brick mansion and a large support building set among scenic landscaping. The mansion, designed by architect Joseph Lyman Silsbee, was originally built in 1877 in a Victorian Gothic style, and was extensively remodeled in the 1920s in the Tudor Revival style. It is a large, 2 1/2-story, asymmetrical brick building with stone trim, Tudor arches, and plain balustrades. The north elevation retains the original 1 1/2-story, red brick walls with polychrome brick trim. The large support structure has a two-story center section, flanked by 1 1/2-story wings, and is in the Jacobean Revival style. The property was originally developed by Rev. Henry Ward Beecher (1813–1887), then purchased by the locally prominent McFadden family in 1902.

It was added to the National Register of Historic Places on November 2, 1987.
