= R. Whidden Ganong =

Canadian businessman from New Brunswick

Whidden Ganong
- Born: October 6, 1906; St. Stephen, New Brunswick, Canada
- Died: March 18, 2000 (aged 93); St. Stephen, New Brunswick, Canada
- Resting place: St. Stephen Rural Cemetery
- Education: Rothesay Collegiate School, Royal Military College
- Occupation: Businessman
- Spouse: Eleanor Katherine Deacon (1910–1982)
- Parents: Arthur D. Ganong; Berla Frances Whidden

Rendol Whidden Ganong, CM (October 2, 1906 – March 18, 2000) was a Canadian businessman from the Province of New Brunswick. Known as Whidden, he was born in the border town of St. Stephen, the eldest son of Berla Frances Whidden and Arthur D. Ganong.

Ganong studied at St. Stephen High School, Rothesay Collegiate School in Rothesay, New Brunswick, and Royal Military College in Kingston, Ontario. In 1927 he went to work for Ganong Bros., the family-owned chocolate making business.

In 1955-56, Whidden Ganong served as Chairman of the Atlantic Provinces Economic Council. In 1957 he succeeded his father as president of the firm, serving in that capacity until his retirement in 1977. He was named a Member of the Order of Canada in 1989.

Whidden and Eleanor Ganong maintained a home in St. Stephen and owned a 330-acre (1.3 km^{2}) farm at Todd's Point, New Brunswick located five miles (8 km) east of St. Stephen along New Brunswick Route 1. The property separates the St. Croix Estuary from Oak Bay. Whidden Ganong died in 2000, predeceased by his wife in 1982. Their farm property is now the Ganong Nature Park.
