= William Francis Ganong Jr. =

American physiologist

- Born: July 6, 1924; Northampton, Massachusetts, US
- Died: December 23, 2007 (aged 83); Albany, California, US
- Education: Harvard Medical School
- Occupation(s): Scientist, educator, writer
- Spouse: Ruth Jackson
- Children: 4
- Parent(s): William Francis Ganong & Anna Hobbet Ganong

William Francis Ganong Jr. (July 6, 1924 – December 23, 2007) was an American physiologist at the University of California, San Francisco (UCSF), and was one of the first scientists to trace how the brain controls important internal functions of the body.

== Early life ==
William Francis "Fran" Ganong Jr. was born in Northampton, Massachusetts, the son of botanist and Smith College professor William Francis Ganong Sr. and geologist Anna Hobbet Ganong.

Ganong was a graduate of Harvard Medical School and served with the United States Army during World War II and the Korean War in which he was part of a medical team that established a MASH unit, the Hemorrhagic Fever Center.

== Career ==
He was one of the discoverers of Lown–Ganong–Levine syndrome, an electrical abnormality that affects heart rhythm.

Ganong became an assistant professor at the University of California, Berkeley, in 1955. Three years later, he moved to the University of California, San Francisco, (UCSF) to help start a research program in physiology. In the course of his research, he discovered that blood pressure and fluid balance – the salt and water levels in the body – are regulated by hormones from the adrenal gland and the kidney, a key finding for developing ways to treat hypertension.

He was chairman of the physiology department at UCSF from 1970 to 1987, and served as the 50th president of the American Physiological Society, from 1977 to 1978. He retired in 1999, but continued research in neuroendocrinology, becoming the Lange Professor of Physiology Emeritus at UCSF.

== Publications ==
Ganong was the author of the influential textbook Review of Medical Physiology, first published in 1963 and, as of 2019, in its 26th edition. It has been translated into 18 languages.

== Personal life ==
Ganong died in Albany, California, at the age of 83, after living with prostate cancer for 17 years.
