= Weiden =

Weiden may refer to:

== Places ==
In Austria

- Weiden am See in the district of Neusiedl am See in Burgenland
- Weiden bei Rechnitz in the district of Oberwart in the Burgenland
- Weiden an der March in the district of Gänserndorf in Lower Austria

In Germany

- Weiden in der Oberpfalz, a city in Upper Palatinate, Bavaria
- Weiden, Rhineland-Palatinate, in Birkenfeld in Rhineland-Palatinate
- Part of the Municipality of Kürten in the Rheinisch-Bergischer Kreis in North Rhine-Westphalia
- Weiden, Cologne, part of the city district Lindenthal of Cologne

In Italy

- Udine, former German name of Udine
