= Sunkist Growers, Incorporated =

American citrus company

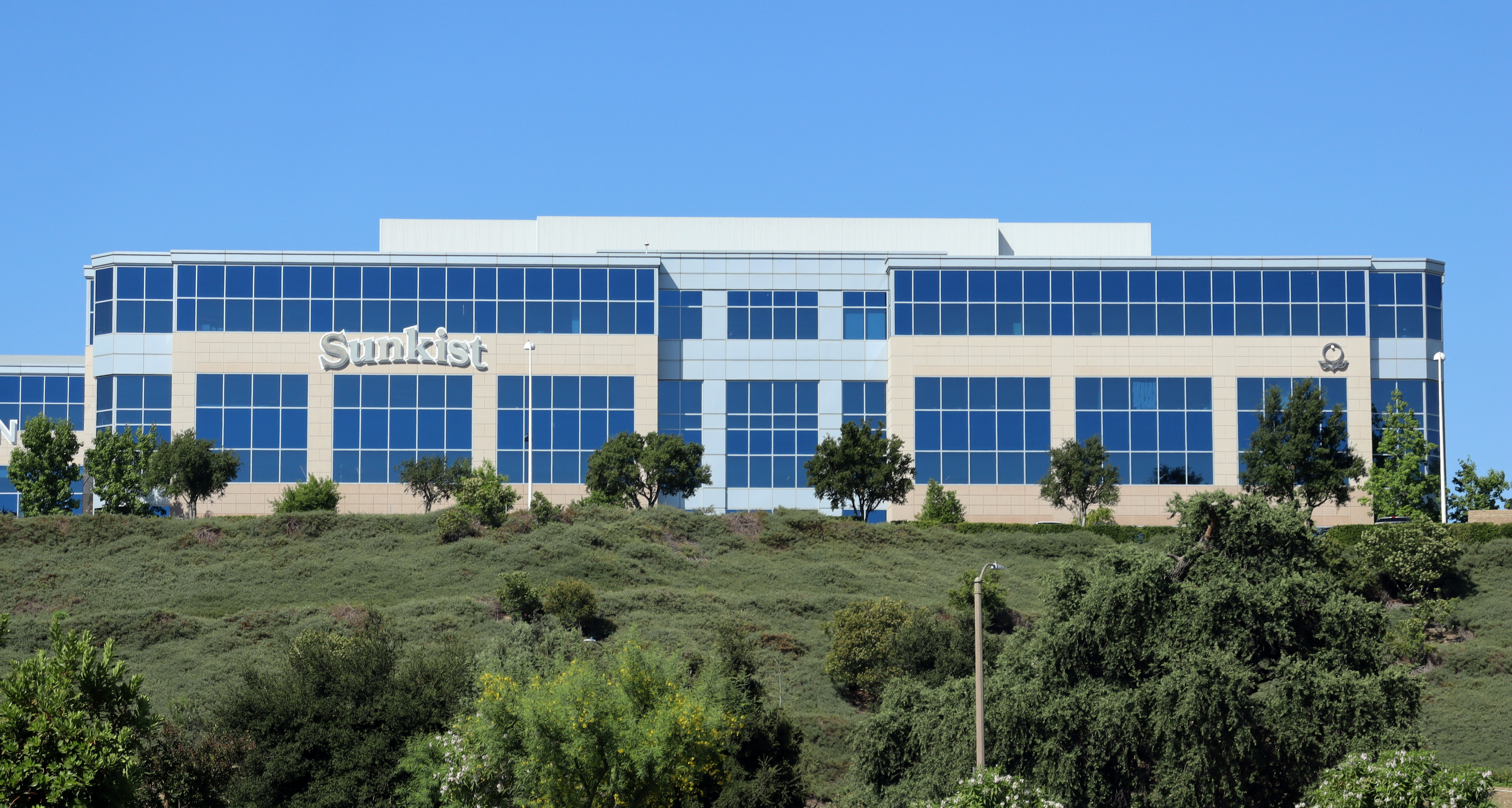
- Sunkist headquarters in Valencia
- Type: Agricultural marketing cooperative
- Industry: Agriculture
- Founded: 1893; 133 years ago in Claremont, California
- Founder: P.J. Dreher and Edward L. Dreher
- Headquarters: Valencia, California, U.S.
- Area served: California and Arizona
- Products: Citrus
- Website: www.sunkist.com

Sunkist Growers, Incorporated, branded as Sunkist in 1909, is an American citrus growers' non-stock membership cooperative composed of over 1,000 members from California and Arizona headquartered in Valencia, California. Through 31 offices in the United States and Canada and four offices outside North America, its sales in 1991 totaled $956 million. It is the largest fresh produce shipper in the United States, the most diversified citrus processing and marketing operation in the world, and one of California's largest landowners.

== History ==
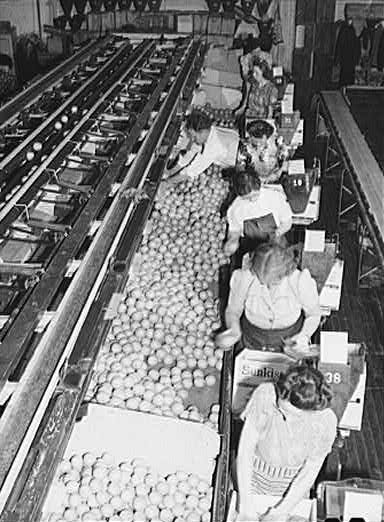
Women packing oranges at a cooperative plant in Redlands, California, 1943

In the late 1880s, California citrus growers began organizing themselves into cooperatives, with the goal of increasing profits by pooling their risk and increasing their collective bargaining power with jobbers and packers. The economic depression that began in 1893 worsened farmers' situations, and intensified their desire to self-organize to their own benefit.

In 1893, P.J. Dreher and his son, Edward L. Dreher, who became the "father of the California citrus industry" (1877–1964), along with several other prominent citrus farmers and land owners formed the Southern California Fruit Exchange in Claremont, a small college town 30 miles (48 km) east of Los Angeles. The exchange originally represented only orange growers; in 1896 lemon growers joined. Growers from Los Angeles County, Orange County, and Riverside County were among the original members and later expanded to growers and groves in San Bernardino and Ventura Counties. By 1905, the exchange represented 5,000 members, 45% of the California citrus industry, and renamed itself the California Fruit Growers Exchange (CFGE).

In 1909 the CFGE launched a successful marketing campaign promoting their brand of "Sunkist" oranges in the Midwest by competing with apples. Instructional circulars were sent to grocers describing how to display oranges in bulk, while large newspaper ads promoted the fruit to customers. Store displays compared prices for apples and oranges side-by-side which increased inventory turnover and cash flow for the grocer. At the same time, California State Senator Frank Flint in Washington D. C. delivered 30 boxes of "Sun-kist" oranges to congressmen and the Vice President, whose testimonials were used for promotion.

Between 1927 and 1939, the exchange sold more than 75% of all California citrus. In the 1947–48 season, the exchange had around 15,000 citrus growers. In 1952, it changed its name to Sunkist Growers, Inc.

As of 2007, Sunkist markets fresh oranges, lemons, limes, grapefruits, and tangerines to 12 states and three Canadian provinces, from 6,000 growers in California and Arizona. From 1971 to 2014, Sunkist was based in the Sherman Oaks district of Los Angeles; in September 2014, it relocated to the Valencia neighborhood of Santa Clarita. Through trademark agreements, Sunkist has licensed its trademark to other firms such as General Mills and Snapple, for marketing more than 600 mainly citrus-flavored products including soft drinks and juice drinks, vitamins, and jellies and candies in more than 50 countries. Sunkist also owns two citrus processing plants which manufacture juice, oils, pulp and peels. Sunkist's subsidiaries for marketing, international sales and fruit purchasing include SunMac Hawaii Ltd., Sunkist Global, LLC in California, Sunkist Pacific, Ltd., in Japan, Sunkist (Far East) Promotion Ltd., in Hong Kong, and Sunkist Real Estate Ltd., in California. Sales in 1991 totalled $956 million, with nearly half of revenues generated outside the United States.

== Organizational structure ==
The Sunkist organization features three levels in its hierarchy: local, district, and central associations. Individual growers belong to their specific local organization; local organizations are part of a district organization, and districts participate in a central organization. The cooperative's main purpose is to create systems enabling fruit from multiple growers to be efficiently harvested, sorted into various sizes and grades, and packed and shipped across the United States in response to shifting demand.

The central exchange fostered scientific research on citrus through its field department and collaborations with the University of California and USDA's Citrus Experiment Station in Riverside.

Since its inception, the organization has significantly expanded its activities. In 1906, the CFGE launched the Citrus Protective League, a lobbying arm. In 1907, it formed the Fruit Growers Supply Company to provide growers with materials such as radios, tires, shooks (components for fruit crates), insecticides, and fertilizers at wholesale prices. It later formed the Sunkist's Exchange By-Products Company, which developed markets for by-products such as citric acid, sodium citrate, lemon oil, pectin, orange oil and orange pulp.

== The Sunkist brand ==
Fruit crate label for Sunkist California Oranges

In its early years, the primary problem facing the California citrus industry was an oversupply of fruit. By 1907, California was producing five times as many oranges as fifteen years earlier. As newly planted orange groves began to bear fruit, the market was flooded with unsalable oranges, and trees were cut down; this prompted a young marketing executive, Albert Lasker with the Lord & Thomas ad agency, who endeavored to avoid food waste, to pitch a sales plan. In 1907 the CFGE approved the first-ever large-scale advertising campaign aimed at marketing a perishable commodity. The March 1907 campaign, promoting oranges to Iowans as "healthy" and "summery", resulted in a 50% increase in orange sales in that state. It also launched the Sunkist brand: Lord & Thomas originally proposed using the adjective "sun-kissed" to describe the CFGE oranges; the word eventually used in the campaign was Sunkist, created by the agency as a mnemonic device which would be easier to defend if used as a trademark.

In an effort to distinguish Sunkist oranges from others, the CFGE wrapped its oranges in paper stamped with the Sunkist brand name. In 1909, after Sunkist learned that merchants were selling non-Sunkist oranges as Sunkist, it began to offer consumers a free Sunkist-branded spoon in exchange for mailing in twelve Sunkist wrappers. One million spoons were claimed in the first year of the promotion, further establishing the brand in consumers' minds and giving merchants a reason to want to display Sunkist oranges in their original wrappers. By 1910, because of the promotion, Sunkist had become the world's largest purchaser of cutlery.

The success of early campaigns prompted Sunkist to invest heavily in advertising, and in coming decades the brand was advertised in magazines and on radio, on billboards, streetcars and railroad cars, on the sides of speedboats, in school curricula and essay contests, and in pamphlets distributed in doctors' offices. Its messaging was aimed to reposition oranges in the minds of consumers. Rather than a luxury to be enjoyed only at Christmas, Sunkist wanted people to believe oranges were essential for good health and to eat one every day.

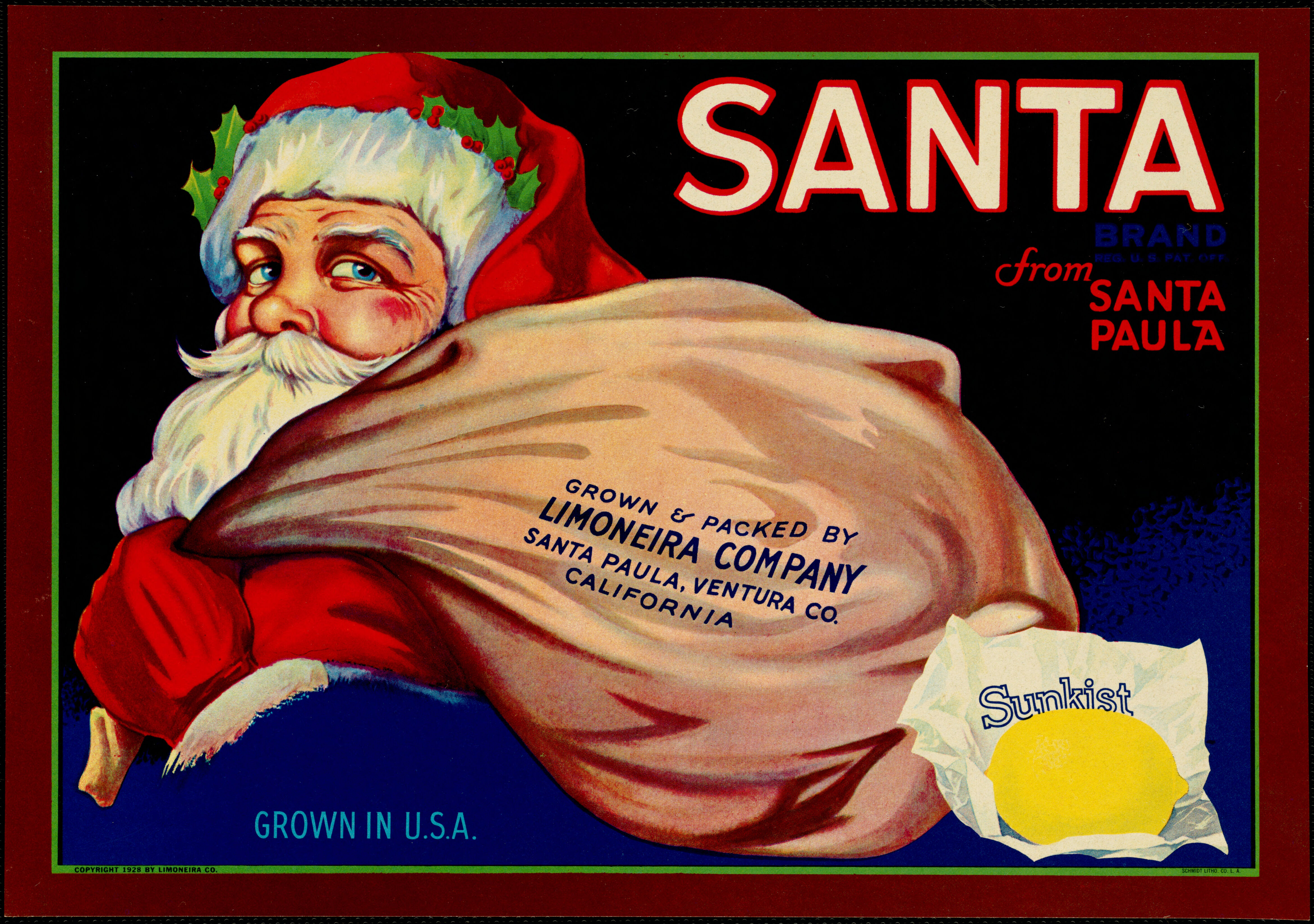
A 1928 ad featuring Santa Claus

Sunkist also invested in marketing fresh-squeezed orange juice and lemonade as superior alternatives to "artificial" beverages such as Coca-Cola. By the mid-1930s, one Sunkist orange in five was being consumed in juice form, often at soda fountains, and Sunkist juice was the second-most-popular soda fountain drink, after Coca-Cola.

By 1914, Americans were consuming about forty oranges per person every year, up 80% from 1885.

In 1915, in response to competition from imported Italian lemons, which at that time had nearly half the American market, Sunkist started aggressively marketing the benefits of Sunkist lemons, promoting their use as a hair rinse, in tea, in pie and as a food garnish. By 1924, California lemons had 90% of the American lemon market.

=== Examples of trademark licensing ===
- Sunkist soft drinks including the orange-flavored "Sunkist Orange Soda" and other fruit-flavored sodas, are produced by Keurig Dr Pepper under license from Sunkist Growers; see Sunkist (soft drink). (US)
- "Sunkist Fruit Gems" are a soft fruit candy produced by Jelly Belly under license from Sunkist. Jelly Belly acquired the former producer, Ben Myerson Candy Company, (US & Canada) a subsidiary of Jelly Belly.
- "Sunkist Fruit Snacks", "Sunkist Fruit & Grain Bars", and "Sunkist Baking Mixes" are marketed by General Mills (US) "Sunkist Fruit First Fruit Snacks" are products of Ganong Bros. (Canada)
- "Sunkist NFC Orange Juice and Juice Drinks" are products of A. Lassonde (Canada)
- "Sunkist Vitamin C & Supplements" are products of WN Pharmaceuticals (Canada)
- Sunkist juice and juice drinks can be found in Japan, South Korea, Hong Kong, Indonesia, Malaysia, several Persian Gulf countries, Belgium, Malta, Austria, and other countries.

== Headquarters ==
In 1935, the eight-story Sunkist Building was built by Walker & Eisen at the corner of 5th street and Hope street. In October 1970, Sunkist traded its land and building for a larger property on Riverside Drive in Sherman Oaks. In 1972, the Sunkist Building was demolished and the site sat empty for two years. In 1981, a structure that opened as the Wells Fargo Building is now FourFortyFour South Flower. The Sunkist 8.3-acre campus in Sherman Oaks is now Citrus Commons. In 2014, Sunkist Growers moved to Valencia, California, near Six Flags Magic Mountain.

== See also ==
- Redlands, California#Citrus
