= St. Croix Soap Manufacturing Company =

Defunct Canadian company

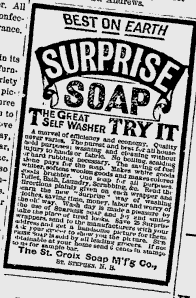
- Type: Privately held company (defunct)
- Industry: Household and personal products
- Founded: 1878; 148 years ago
- Defunct: 1946; 80 years ago
- Headquarters: St. Stephen, New Brunswick, Canada
- Key people: James H. Ganong (co-founder); Gilbert Ganong (co-founder); Freeman H. Todd (co-founder); J. Edwin Ganong
- Products: Soap
- Parent: Lever Brothers (from 1913)

The St. Croix Soap Manufacturing Company was a Canadian business founded in 1878 in St. Stephen, New Brunswick by brothers James and Gilbert Ganong and Freeman H. Todd.

The brothers had earlier founded the Ganong confectionery company and in 1884 dissolved their partnerships with the result that James became sole proprietor of the soap making business. In 1885, St Croix Soap president Charles Young and his wife Addie Todd moved into Dover Hill.

The name is derived from the St. Croix River on whose banks the town of St. Stephen is located.

James Ganong died unexpectedly at the age of forty-seven and his son Edwin took over the running of the business. The St. Croix Soap Manufacturing Company was best known for its Surprise Soap that became a national brand which lasted until 1946. Advertising helped sell the company's products such as the innovative 1894 publishing of The Surprise Cook Book, a recipe collection by the then widely popular American writer Marion Harland. It was formally registered as The Premium Cook Book, the title used by the American Technical Book Company who published it in the United States. The book was reprinted in 1990 by the Atlantic-New England Heritage Committee. (ISBN 0969476906)

In 1913, Edwin Ganong sold the St. Croix Soap Manufacturing Company to Lever Brothers of Toronto, Ontario, a subsidiary of the British conglomerate. Ganong became president of Lever Brothers and moved to Toronto where he remained until his death in 1944. Two years later, Lever Brothers Ltd. closed the St. Stephen plant.

The Garcelon Centre is today built over the remains of the St. Croix Soap factory.
