= Whidden Creek =

Stream in Polk County, Florida, United States

Coordinates: 27°42′29″N 81°47′59″W

Whidden Creek is a stream in Polk County, Florida, in the United States.

Whidden Creek was probably either named for a leader in the Seminole Wars or for a pioneer family who lived there.

== See also ==
- List of rivers of Florida
