= Wyden =

Wyden may refer to:

- Wyden Castle, in Ossingen in the canton of Zurich, Switzerland
- Wyden Monastery, a former Franciscan monastery in Rapperswil-Jona, in the canton of St. Gallen, Switzerland
- Peter H. Wyden (1923–1998), American journalist and writer
- Ron Wyden (born 1949), United States senator for Oregon, son of Peter H. Wyden

== See also ==
- Weyden
