= Wieden (disambiguation) =

Wieden is the fourth district of Vienna, Austria.

Wieden may also refer to:

- Wieden (Lörrach), a municipality in the district of Lörrach, Baden-Württemberg, Germany
- Wieden, a district of Pyhra, Sankt Pölten-Land District, Lower Austria, Austria
- Wieden, a protected area in the Netherlands, part of De Weerribben-Wieden National Park
- Wiedeń, the name for Vienna in Polish
