= Aufruf =

Yiddish phrase

Aufruf (Yiddish: אויפֿרוף, romanized: oyfruf, lit. 'calling up'; plural Yiddish: אויפֿרופֿן, romanized: oyfrufn' (Note: Alternative pronunciations include ofrif, ufruf, and ifrif.) or Shabbat Ḥatan (Hebrew: שבת חתן, lit. 'Groom's Shabbath') refers to the Jewish custom of a groom being called up in the synagogue for an aliyah, the recitation of a blessing over the Torah.

== Customs ==
Ashkenazic Jews typically hold the aufruf on the Shabbat before the wedding, but it may also be held on a Monday or Thursday. In Orthodox communities, the bride typically does not attend the aufruf because it is customary for the bride and groom to refrain from seeing each other for one week before the wedding. Instead, the bride's relatives and friends may gather for a separate celebration known as a Shabbat Kallah, the bride's Sabbath. In non-Orthodox congregations, the bride and groom may be called up to the Torah together.

In the Sephardic and Mizrachi traditions, the Shabbat Ḥatan is typically held on the Shabbat after the wedding, in which case both newlyweds and their families participate.

Among some Hasidic groups, the groom receives his first shtreimel at the aufruf, which he will then wear at the wedding ceremony.

After the Torah reading, the congregation sings a congratulatory song and the women throw bags of sweets at the groom. (In the German Jewish tradition, the custom of throwing candy is not practiced.) It is customary for the family of the groom to invite the congregation to a festive kiddush (celebratory meal) after the services.

== See also ==
- Jewish views on marriage
