= Atlantic Provinces Economic Council =

Organization based in Canada

The Atlantic Provinces Economic Council is a Canadian independent, non-partisan research and educational institution founded in 1954 whose objective is to promote the economic development of Atlantic Canada.

It accomplishes this by:

- monitoring and analysing current and emerging economic trends and policies
- communicating the results of this analysis to its members on a regular basis
- consulting with a wide audience
- disseminating its research and policy analyses to business, government and the community at large
- advocating the appropriate public and private sector policy responses
