= Vach nacht =

Jewish ritual period

A vach nacht (Yiddish: וואך-נאכט, lit. 'watch night'; also vacht nacht or vakhnakht) or Brit Yitzchak (Hebrew: ברית יצחק, lit. 'covenant of Isaac') is the night before the brit milah of a male Jewish child, when he is in need of added spiritual protection. A standard "vach nacht" custom, practised by many Ashkenazi Jews, is to have children come and recite the Shema Yisrael and other verses from the Torah near the baby. It is a pious custom to host a celebratory meal.

== Origins ==
The Edut L'Yisrael (a text on sources for customs surrounding weddings and births in Judaism, published in Israel c. 1960) brings sources for the custom to learn and post the night before the brit, as well as make a festive meal. He brings sources at length:

=== Learning and prayer ===
Firstly, as stressed in the Kabbalistic sources, the night before the circumcision is considered a spiritually dangerous time for the baby; as such, the father would gather ten men to conduct a vigil to study Torah to protect him from metaphysical damage. Thus, this night is given the Yiddish name, "night of watching [or 'guarding']".

Secondly, non-Kabbalistic sources describe a practice several centuries old, that on the Friday night before the brit milah, a melamed would take his preschool-age students to say Shema near the baby, and afterwards receive candy (or their equivalent at that point in history, namely nuts or dried fruit).

=== Festive meal ===
The source for the festive meal can be found in the writings of the Rishonim.
