= Howard P. Whidden =

Canadian politician

- Born: Howard Primrose Whidden; 12 July 1871; Antigonish, Nova Scotia, Canada
- Died: 30 March 1952; Toronto, Ontario, Canada
- Occupation(s): churchman, member of Parliament, educator, scholar and editor of Canadian Baptist
- Spouse: Katherine "Kit" Louise Ganong

Howard Primrose Whidden (July 12, 1871 – March 30, 1952) was a Canadian churchman, member of Parliament, educator, scholar, avid skier, and editor of Canadian Baptist. He served as chancellor of McMaster University in Ontario for 18 years to 1941, overseeing its move from Toronto to Hamilton. Prior to that, he was president of Brandon College in Manitoba for 11 years.

Whidden Hall at McMaster University is named after Chancellor Whidden, as is the Whidden scholarship at McMaster University.

== Early life and education ==
Born in Antigonish Harbour, Nova Scotia, he graduated from Acadia University. He then studied at McMaster University in Ontario, then did post-graduate work at the University of Chicago in Illinois.

== Career ==
Reverend Whidden served as a home mission pastor in Manitoba and in Galt, Ontario..He later became secretary of the Baptist home mission board.

From 1898 to 1900, he was a lecturer at McMaster University in Toronto, Ontario. From 1900 to 1903, he was professor of Biblical literature and English at Brandon College, Brandon, Manitoba.

From 1904 to 1912, he was pastor, First Baptist Church, Dayton, Ohio.

Whidden was president of Brandon College in Brandon, Manitoba, from 1912 to 1923.

In 1917, he was elected to the House of Commons as a Unionist, serving for one parliament. He sat in the House of Commons of Canada for four years as a member of the Robert Borden/Conservative led Union government of 1917 (which gave women the right to vote).

He was appointed in 1923 sixth Chancellor of McMaster University, then in Toronto, Ontario; and served for 18 years to 1941, making him the longest-serving chancellor or president, to that time.

In 1936, he received an honorary doctorate DD, Victoria University (now Victoria College, University of Toronto)

== Personal life and death ==
Howard married Katherine "Kit" Louise Ganong (daughter of James H. Ganong and Susan E. (Brittain) Ganong) born February 14, 1870, in Malden, Massachusetts. Her sister, Susie, was the proprietor and Principal of the Netherwood School for girls in Rothesay, New Brunswick. Kit Whidden died on April 4, 1959, at the home of her son in Wolfville, Nova Scotia, and was buried on April 8, 1959, beside her husband and daughter Susan in Mount Pleasant Cemetery, Toronto.

Howard and Catherine had eight children, including Dr. Rev. Evan McDonald Whidden (9 July 1898 - 11 March 1980) and Howard Primrose, Ph.D., LL.D. (4 August 1910 - 12 March 1977), a senior editor of Business Week magazine.

He died in Toronto, Ontario, and was buried 2 April 1952 at Mount Pleasant Cemetery, Toronto.

== See also ==
- Whidden Lectures
