= Ganong Bros. =

Canadian candy company

Ganong Bros., Limited
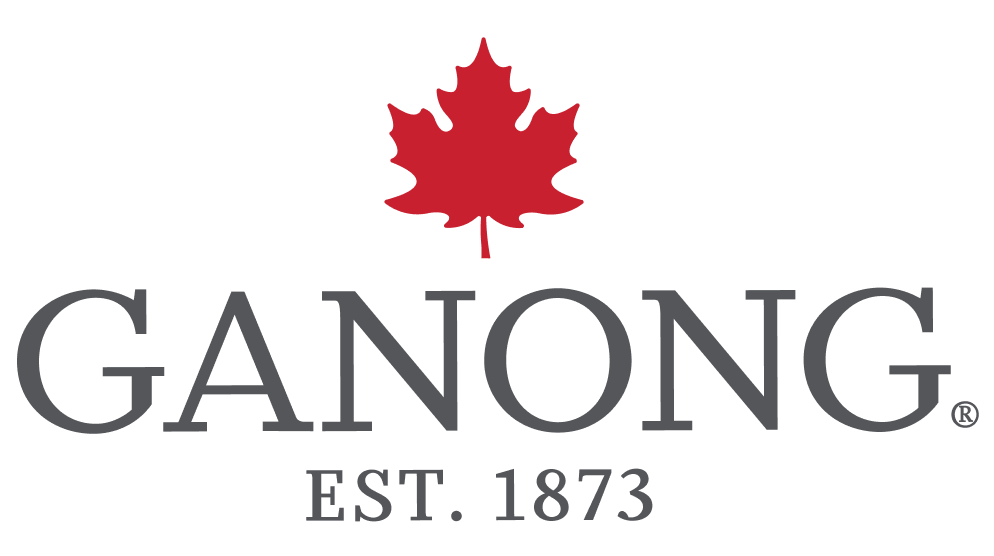

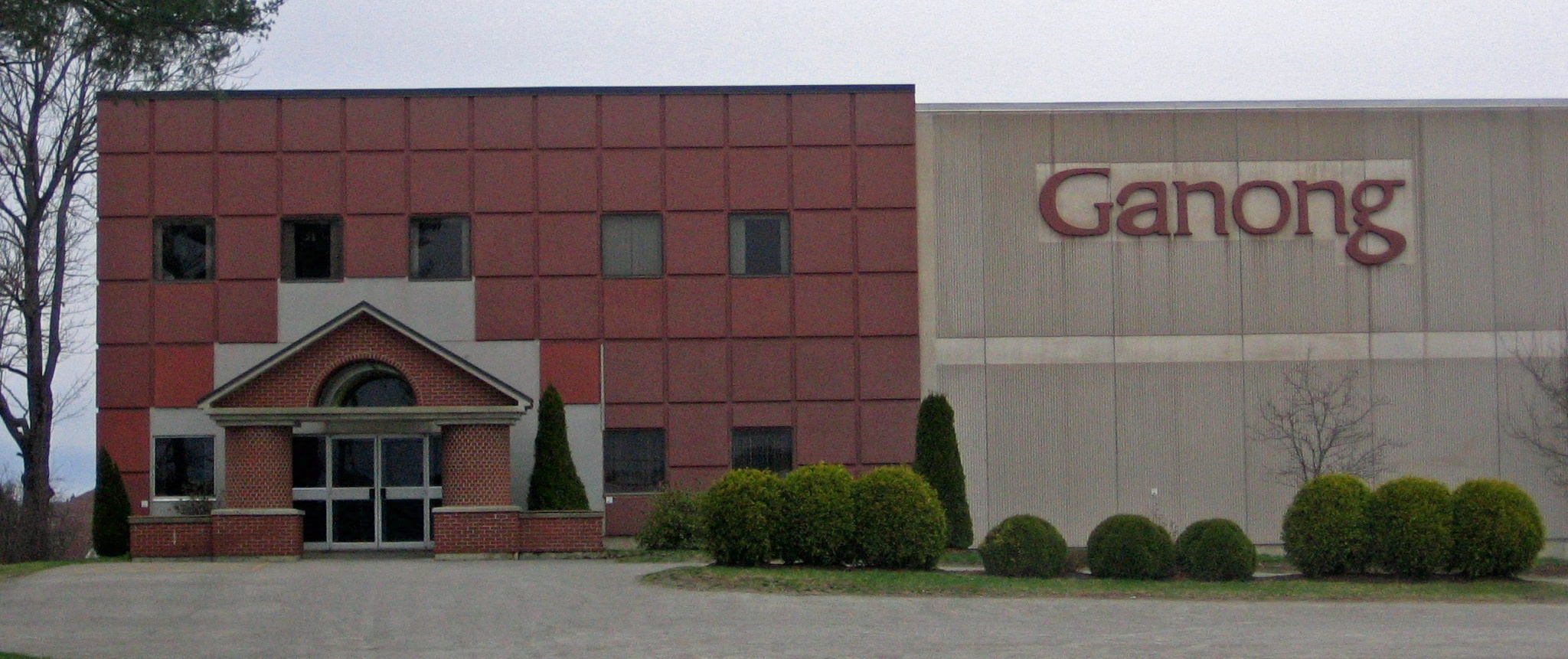
- Ganong Bros. factory, pictured in 2006
- Type: Private
- Industry: Confectionery
- Founded: June 5, 1873; 153 years ago
- Founders: Gilbert W. Ganong; James H. Ganong
- Headquarters: 1 Chocolate Drive, St. Stephen, New Brunswick, Canada
- Key people: Bryana Ganong (President & CEO); Nick Ganong (COO)
- Products: Chocolate (including Pal-o-mine)
- Number of employees: 300 (2022)
- Website: ganong.com

Ganong Bros., Limited is a Canadian chocolate and confectionery company based in St. Stephen, New Brunswick. Founded in 1873 by brothers James and Gilbert Ganong, it is the oldest company in its industry in Canada. The family-owned company is in its fifth generation of ownership. Primarily a producer of boxed chocolates and the first to introduce heart-shaped boxes, it now provides many chocolates for Laura Secord stores.

== History ==
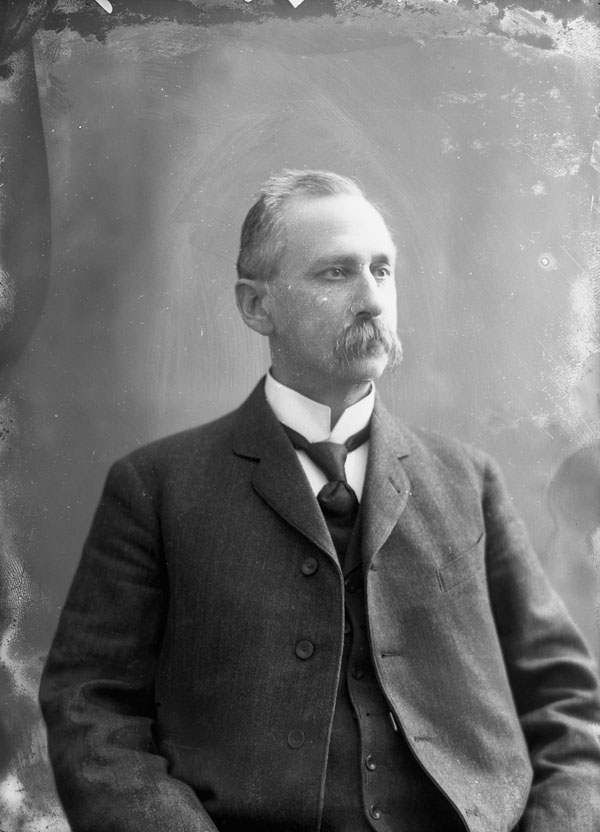
James (left) and Gilbert Ganong (right), the founders of the company

Ganong Bros. Limited was founded on June 5, 1873, as G. W. Ganong, Commission Merchant, Etc. James H. Ganong had convinced his brother, a teacher and aspiring physician named Gilbert Ganong, to start a grocery store with him in St. Stephen. They advertised their opening in the Saint Croix Courier, though the business began failing. They then started selling candy goods, then began manufacturing it themselves after struggling to get suppliers to do business with them.

In 1884, the brothers' partnership was dissolved; Gilbert maintained this business, while James left to focus on the St. Croix Soap Manufacturing Company, a soap manufacturer based in the same town.

Ganong Bros. Limited has been one of the Canadian chocolate industry's most important companies. Arthur Ganong was the first to make any sort of a wrapped chocolate bar; Ganong began selling the first chocolate bars in 1910. In 1920 they began using the brand name "Pal-o-Mine" for their chocolate bar.

The company also was the first to introduce a heart-shaped box of chocolates in North America. The heart-shaped boxes were originally used for presents over the Christmas season before it also succeeded around Valentine's Day.

In 1911, Ganong Bros. purchased the bankrupt White Candy Company in Saint John, New Brunswick and operated a factory there until 1931. In 1988, due to the rising costs of production, a plant was built in Bangkok, Thailand, due to lower labor costs and the close proximity to raw ingredients, and equipment from the St. Stephen factory was shipped there. The majority of the products from this factory is shipped to Canada. In 1990, a new factory was opened on Chocolate Drive, St. Stephen and continues to produce to this day. The old factory eventually became the Chocolate Museum.

In 1997, the company acquired the manufacturing and marketing license for fruit snacks under the Sunkist brand in Canada from Sunkist as well as Lipton.

Charlotte County's politics were always sharply divided, as Connors Brothers Limited and its employees overwhelmingly supported the Liberal Party's protectionism to keep fish from being sold to US merchants at a higher price, while Ganongs and its employees overwhelmingly supported the Conservative Party's free trade as it brought low-cost sugar by rail through Maine cheaper than from further away in Canada.

=== Today ===
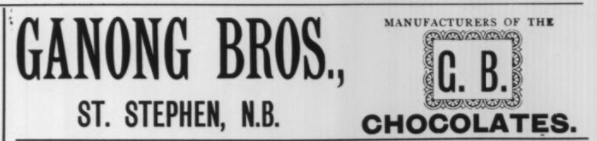
An 1891 advertisement

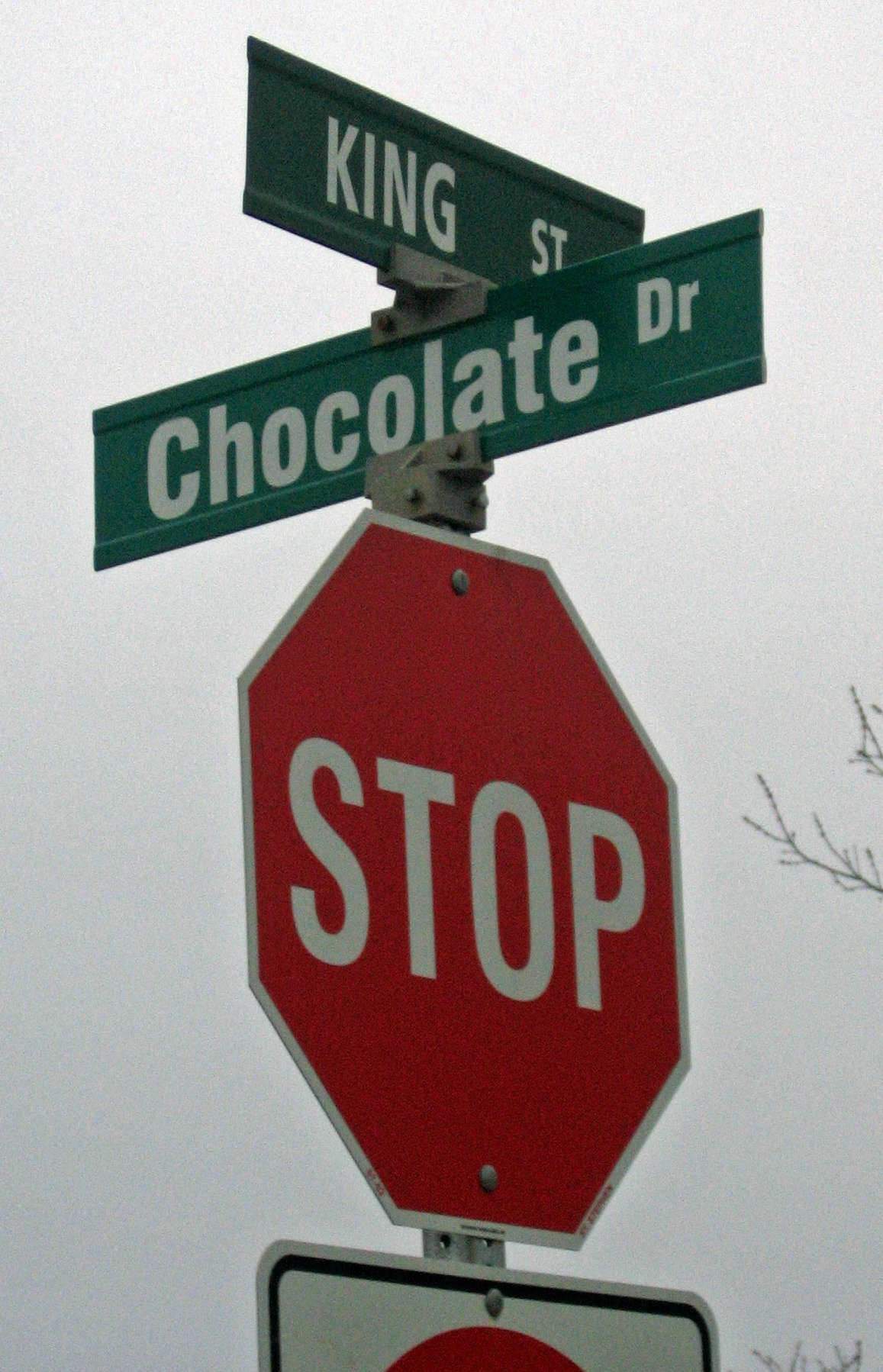
The new Ganong factory opened in 1990, located appropriately on "Chocolate Drive"

In 2008, for the first time in its history, Ganong selected a president and CEO from outside the family. Doug Ettinger, who had been a senior executive in the food industry for 20 years, was approved by the Ganong board of directors as the top executive of Canada’s oldest candy company.

In 2015, the first female CEO was appointed: Bryana Ganong, part of the fifth generation of Ganongs. David Ganong maintains an advisory role on the company’s board and remains the controlling shareholder.

Company heads

- James H. Ganong, co-founder
- Gilbert W. Ganong, co-founder
- Arthur D. Ganong, president 1917–1957
- R. Whidden Ganong, president 1957–1977
- David A. Ganong, president 1977–2008
- Doug Ettinger, president 2008 to 2012
- David A. Ganong, president 2012 –2014
- Bryana Ganong, president 2014 to present

== Chocolate Museum ==
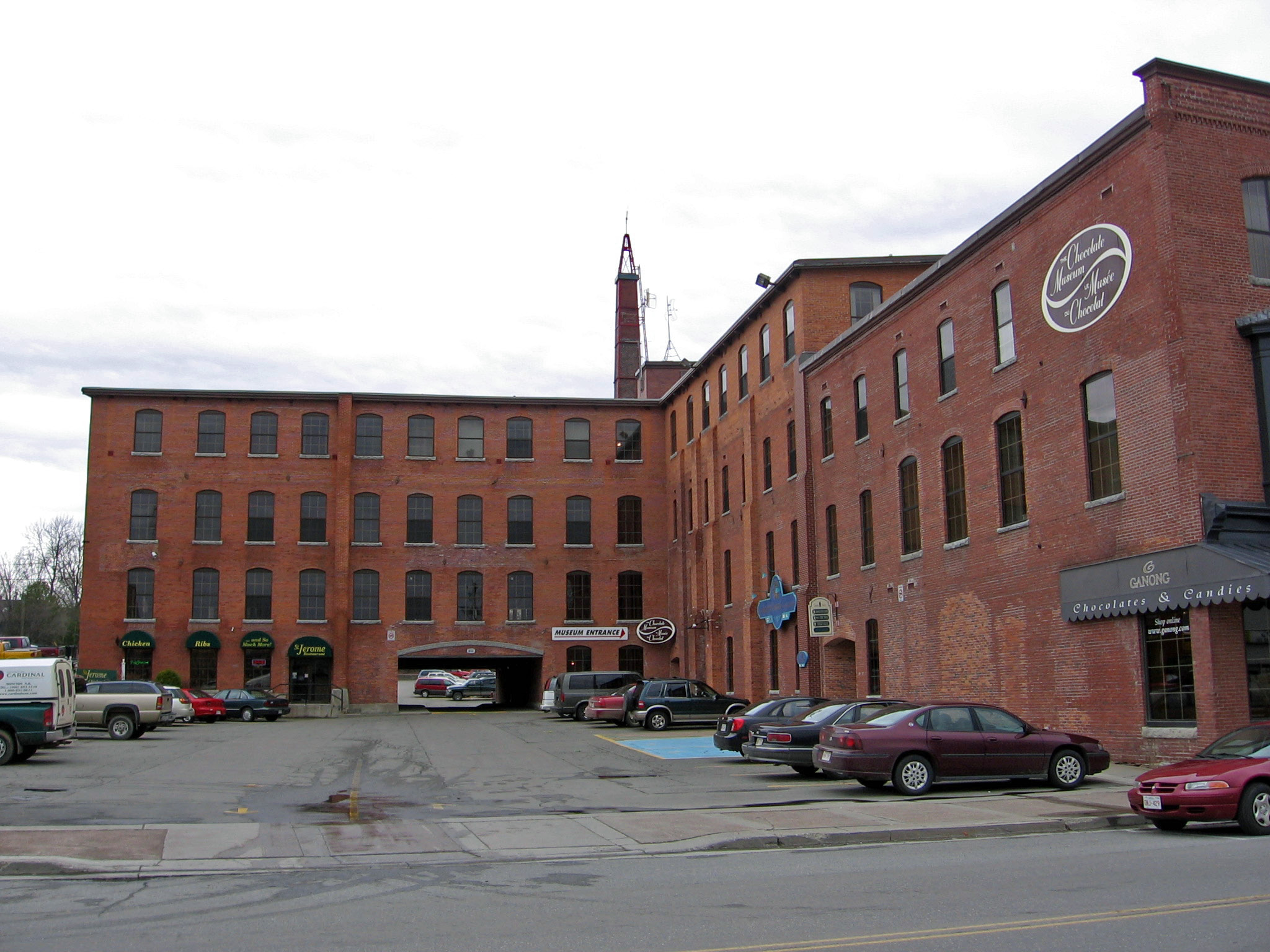
The old Ganong factory has become the Chocolate Museum, where one can learn about the history of Ganong Brothers.

Ganong's long history is showcased at its Chocolate Museum (Fr:Le Musée du Chocolat) which opened in 1999 in their old factory building in St. Stephen, New Brunswick. Exhibits describe the Ganong brothers and the company, and include hands-on and interactive displays about the process of making chocolate and candies historically and currently, and a display of historic chocolate boxes and antique candy-making equipment. Visitors can also taste chocolate samples. The building also houses the Ganong Chocolatier company store.

In conjunction with the community, the museum co-hosts the annual St. Stephen Chocolate Festival, which has been held since 1985. In 2000 the town was registered as "Canada's Chocolate Town".

== Products ==
Product	Introduced	Description
Chicken Bones	1885	Dark chocolate surrounded by cinnamon-flavored candy
Delecto	1917	Boxed chocolates
Hillcrest		"Nearly Perfect" assorted chocolates and chocolate cherries. An economy brand of chocolates
Pal-o-Mine	1920	A soft fudge and peanut bar covered in dark chocolate
Red Wrap		Originally, a 5 lb box of assorted milk and dark chocolates. Usually available during the Christmas season. Originally named "Ganong's Best" (GB), the nickname "Red Wrap" (due to the red packaging) was officially adopted as the name in the 2000s (decade)
Sunkist fruit snacks	1997	Sunkist-branded fruit snacks, of which Ganong Bros. is the official licensee in Canada

=== Discontinued products ===
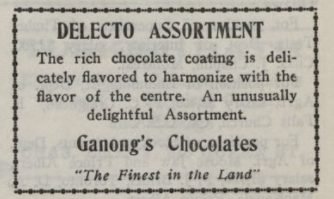
1921 advertisement.

==== Mints ====
Ganong Bros.'s "double-thick" wintergreen mints were, until being discontinued in 2019, manufactured by the company since around 1889. They came in white and pink colours, were particularly larger than the average mint candy, and were coated with a powder. Since the company used traditional "antiquated equipment," manufacturing the mints had grown to be too costly. In 2021, they were temporarily re-released for a limited time.

==== Fruitland Chews ====
Fruitland Chews were a line of jelly fruit snacks that Ganong Bros. began manufacturing in 1989, as a means of competing against the dominating Betty Crocker. They used fruit purée to make them. The line was merged in 1997 when Ganong Bros. acquired the rights for Sunkist in Canada.

== See also ==
- Laura Secord Chocolates
- List of food and beverage museums
- Purdy's Chocolates
- J. Howard Crocker, machinist at Ganong Bros.
