= Gross Island =

Island in Nunavut, Canada

- Interactive map of Gross Island

Geography
- Location: Frobisher Bay
- Coordinates: 62°02′N 065°53′W
- Archipelago: Arctic Archipelago

Administration
- Canada
- Nunavut: Nunavut
- Region: Qikiqtaaluk

Demographics
- Population: Uninhabited

Gross Island is a Baffin Island offshore island located in the Arctic Archipelago in the territory of Nunavut. The island lies in Frobisher Bay, south of Potter Island. It is separated from the Lower Savage Islands by the Gabriel Strait. Edgell Island and Resolution Island are to the southeast.
