= Hay Island (New Brunswick) =

Island in New Brunswick, Canada

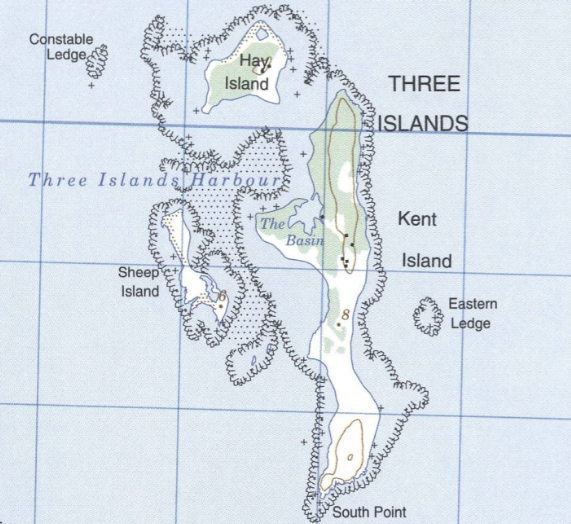
- Interactive map of Hay Island

Geography
- Location: Bay of Fundy
- Coordinates: 44°35′42″N 66°45′50″W
- Area: 30 acres (12 ha)

Administration
- Canada
- Province: New Brunswick
- County: Charlotte
- Parish: Grand Manan Parish

Hay Island is an undeveloped island in the Grand Manan Parish of Charlotte County, New Brunswick, Canada in the Bay of Fundy.

It has spruce and fir trees, and is connected to Kent Island by a 300-metre intertidal zone that surfaces at low tide.

In 1991, Hay and Sheep Island were still owned by Owen and Jack Ingalls. Bowdoin College purchased the islands in 2004.

== History ==
=== Acquisition ===
In 1913 a Grand Manan fisherman named Ernest Joy shot a large seabird near Machias Seal Island. Allan Moses identified it as an Atlantic yellow-nosed albatross, a bird normally found in the Southern Ocean. Joy gave the albatross, only the second ever sighted in North America, to Moses, who prepared a study skin from it.

The American ornithologist Leonard Cutler Sanford made two visits to Grand Manan, attempting to purchase the specimen for the American Museum of Natural History. For several years Moses refused to sell it, but eventually agreed to donate it to the museum in return for a chance to take part in a future scientific expedition. This led to his participation in a 1928-29 ornithological expedition to Tanganyika Territory and the Belgian Congo led by John Sterling Rockefeller.

The main goal of the expedition was to find and collect the rare Grauer's broadbill, which was known only by one 1908 specimen in the Walter Rothschild Zoological Museum in England, and which had eluded collectors for twenty years. On July 26, 1929, in a mountainous area at the northern end of Lake Tanganyika, Moses was the first to find and shoot a Grauer's broadbill.

In order to thank Moses for his work on the expedition and for collecting the first Grauer's broadbill, Rockefeller undertook to purchase Kent Island and the two nearby islands, Hay Island and Sheep Island, and make them a bird sanctuary. The owner of Kent Island sold it for $25,000, but Henry Ingalls, the owner of the two smaller islands, refused to sell. He was a fisherman who continued to live on Hay Island. However, he agreed to allow access to his property for "scientific purposes", such as counting nests. Rockefeller hired two resident wardens for Kent Island, Moses himself and Ralph Griffin of Grand Manan. Each received an annual salary of $1000. They moved to the island in June 1930. Over the succeeding years, the eider population increased dramatically, reaching several hundred nesting pairs by 1935.

In 1962 Hay Island was a focus for researchers studying flea infestations in migratory bird nests.

In 1959, Wesley Ingalls brought a dozen arctic snowshoe hares by boat to Hay Island hoping they would reproduce and he could snare them to sell in winter. The hares multiplied quickly, and were able to cross to Kent Island at low tide thus quickly becoming dominant herbivores voraciously destroying saplings and young trees slowly deforesting the islands. In 1998 and again in 2002 professor Nathaniel Wheelwright at Kent's Bowdoin research station tried to eradicate the hares unsuccessfully. A 2007 effort was successful.

Shipwrecks around the island include the schooner Palacca Dec 15 1855.
