= Potter Island =

Island in Nunavut, Canada

- Location within Nunavut Location within Canada

Geography
- Location: Frobisher Bay
- Coordinates: 62°07′N 65°55′W
- Archipelago: Arctic Archipelago

Administration
- Canada
- Nunavut: Nunavut
- Region: Qikiqtaaluk

Demographics
- Population: Uninhabited

Potter Island is an uninhabited island located in the Arctic Archipelago within the Qikiqtaaluk Region of Nunavut. It is a Baffin Island offshore island situated in Frobisher Bay. It is north of Lower Savage Islands, and northwest of Resolution Island and Edgell Island.
