= Godfrey Rockefeller =

Godfrey Rockefeller may refer to:

- Godfrey A. Rockefeller (1924–2010), American aviator
- Godfrey Stillman Rockefeller (1899–1983), American financier
- Godfrey Lewis Rockefeller (1783–1857), American farmer and businessman
