= Kent Island (New Brunswick) =

Island in New Brunswick, Canada

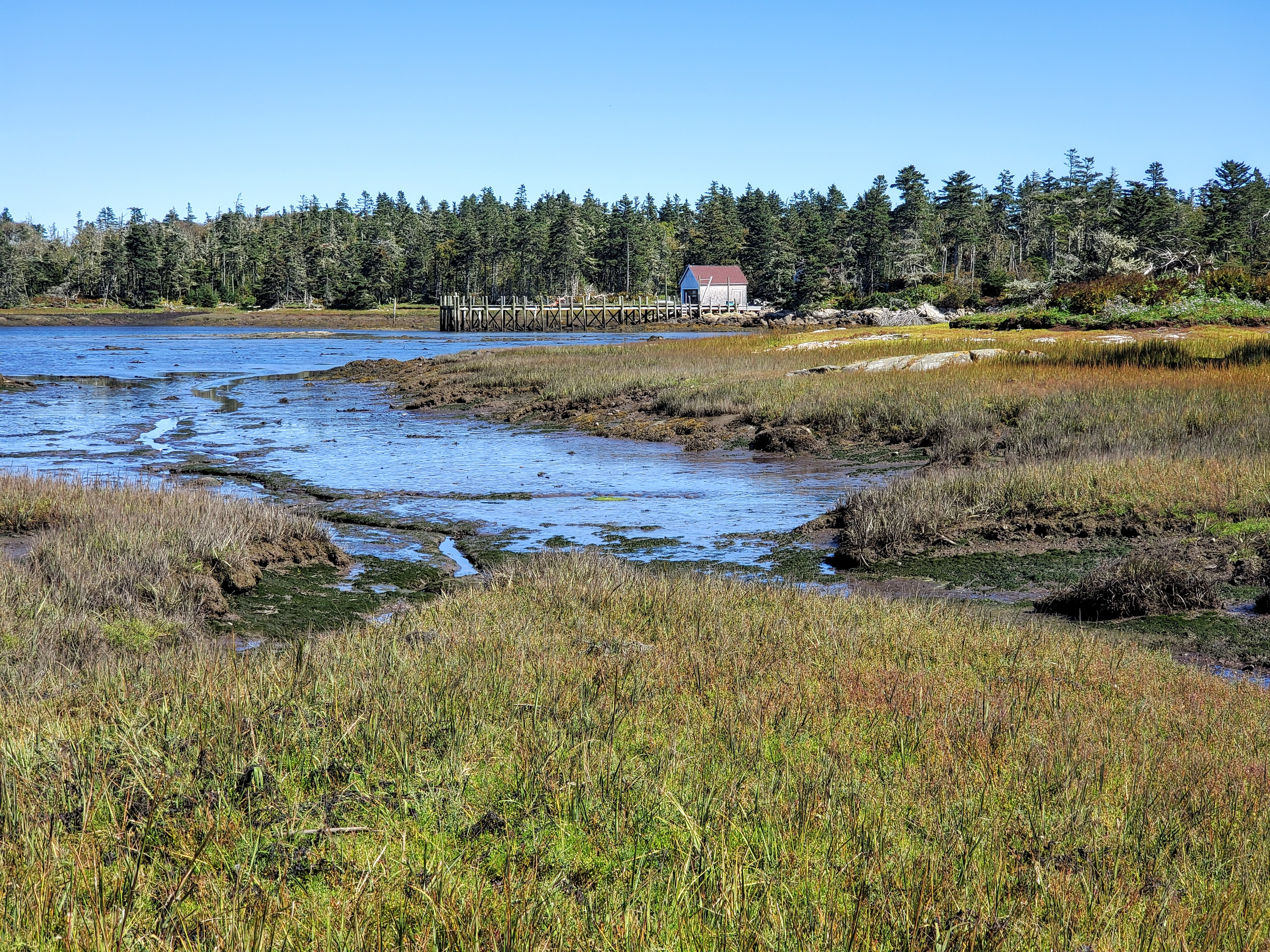
- Kent Island dock

- Location within New Brunswick

Geography
- Location: Bay of Fundy
- Coordinates: 44°34′55″N 66°45′22″W
- Area: 247 acres (100 ha)
- Length: 1.8 mi (2.9 km)
- Highest elevation: 61 ft (18.6 m)

Administration
- Canada
- Province: New Brunswick

Kent Island is an island located 6 miles (9.7 km) from Grand Manan in the Bay of Fundy. It is the outermost island of the Grand Manan archipelago in Charlotte County off the coast of New Brunswick, Canada. More than 200 bird species have been identified on the island, with at least fifty species nesting.

It is owned by Bowdoin College and is the site of the Bowdoin Scientific Station. As of 2023 over 220 scientific papers had been published as a result of research carried on at the research station. Notable topics, resulting in exceptionally long datasets, include the Leach's storm petrel, the herring gull, and the Savannah sparrow, as well as fog research collected over a period of sixty years.

== Settlement and early history ==
Abenaki people regularly visited Kent island to hunt seals, but there were no permanent inhabitants until the arrival in 1799 of John Kent, a British settler, with his wife Susanna. They had eight children, three of whom were born on the island. Kent cleared the island's centre to allow for agriculture; the southern portion of the island saw its forests die from unknown causes, leaving only the north wooded with fir and spruce. Kent also worked as a maritime pilot. He was credited with saving a total of 93 sailors from wrecked ships between 1810 and 1824. His son Jonathan became keeper of the Gannet Rock Lighthouse in 1837.

John Kent died in 1828 and his widow lived alone on the island until her death in 1853. She was said by local people to be a witch who had caused a shipwreck by luring a vessel onto a reef. She was also supposed to have proclaimed a "Kent Island Curse" prophesying that she would be the last inhabitant of the island. The island remained largely uninhabited until it was purchased by the McLaughlin family in 1920.

Shipwrecks around the island include the Penelope (July 1814), barq Hyack' (Jan 29 1875),, schooner AH Sawyer (July 19 1878), brigatine Artos (July 1 1892) and the schooner Defender (Oct 29 1929)

Kent Island was a main breeding ground for the Common eider. However, the activities of hunters and egg collectors had led to a serious decline in the birds' numbers. By the 1920s there were estimated to be at most 30 breeding pairs from the Gulf of Maine southward along the Atlantic Coast. Most of these nested on Kent Island. The decline in the eider population as a result of excessive hunting alarmed Allan Moses, a naturalist, taxidermist, and conservationist who lived on Grand Manan.

== Purchase by John Sterling Rockefeller ==
In 1913 a Grand Manan fisherman named Ernest Joy shot a large seabird near Machias Seal Island. Allan Moses identified it as an Atlantic yellow-nosed albatross, a bird normally found in the Southern Ocean. Joy gave the albatross, only the second ever sighted in North America, to Moses, who prepared a study skin from it.

The American ornithologist Leonard Cutler Sanford made two visits to Grand Manan, attempting to purchase the specimen for the American Museum of Natural History. For several years Moses refused to sell it, but eventually agreed to donate it to the museum in return for a chance to take part in a future scientific expedition. This led to his participation in a 1928-29 ornithological expedition to Tanganyika Territory and the Belgian Congo led by John Sterling Rockefeller.

The main goal of the expedition was to find and collect the rare Grauer's broadbill, which was known only by one 1908 specimen in the Walter Rothschild Zoological Museum in England, and which had eluded collectors for twenty years. On July 26, 1929, in a mountainous area at the northern end of Lake Tanganyika, Moses was the first to find and shoot a Grauer's broadbill.

In order to thank Moses for his work on the expedition and for collecting the first Grauer's broadbill, Rockefeller undertook to purchase Kent Island and the two nearby islands, Hay Island and Sheep Island, and make them a bird sanctuary. The owner of Kent Island sold it for $25,000, but the owner of the two smaller islands refused to sell. He was a fisherman who continued to live on Hay Island. However, he agreed to allow access to his property for "scientific purposes", such as counting nests. Rockefeller hired two resident wardens for Kent Island, Moses himself and Ralph Griffin of Grand Manan. Each received an annual salary of $1000. They moved to the island in June 1930. Over the succeeding years, the eider population increased dramatically, reaching several hundred nesting pairs by 1935.

== The Bowdoin Scientific Station ==
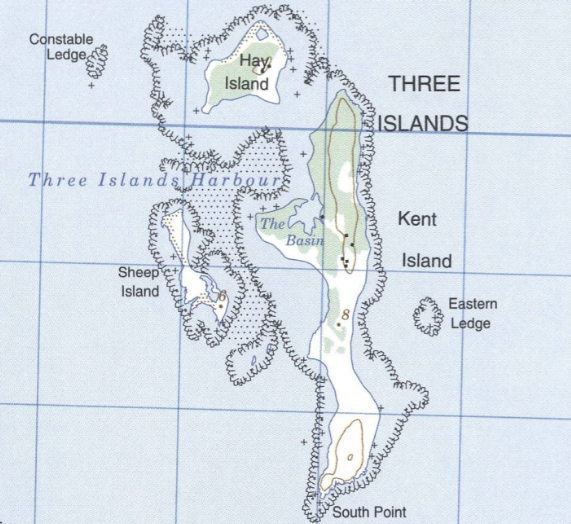
The three islands

In 1932 ornithologists Ernst Mayr and Alfred Otto Gross, professor of Biology at Bowdoin College, visited the island at Rockefeller's invitation to conduct a bird survey. In 1934 four Bowdoin students led by William Gross, Alfred Otto Gross's son, spent the summer on the island carrying out research. In 1936, at William Gross's suggestion, Rockefeller donated the island to Bowdoin College as a biological research station in exchange for the nominal fee of one dollar ($1.00) and the college's commitment to maintain it as a bird sanctuary. The island's first year-round warden was Ernest Joy, the fisherman whose shooting of an albatross in 1913 had led to Rockefeller's purchase of the island.

In the first year of operation five buildings were built, a meteorological station was set up, and the island was included in an international survey of the herring gull population. A radio station on the island provided daily weather reports and other broadcasts, including the sounds of nesting Leach's storm petrels. In 1937 researchers from the Cornell University Laboratory of Ornithology used a shortwave radio and a portable field amplifier at the research station to transmit the petrel calls to Grand Manan, where they were recorded. Also in 1937, Robert M. Cunningham first visited Kent Island as a high school student. He managed the weather station and began collecting samples of fog water which were later subjected to chemical analysis. In the 1980s Cunningham contributed his analysis of decades of daily fog samples from Kent Island to research on the effect of acid rain on forests.

The research station operated every summer until 1941 and was revived after World War II by Raymond Paynter, who carried out demographic research on herring gulls and tree swallows. In 1956 it was being used only for an annual field trip by Bowdoin College ornithology students, although its director, Charles E. Huntington, wanted it to be active "all through the summer". Huntington, who directed the station until his retirement in 1986, began studying the Leach's storm petrel on Kent Island in 1953. This research is continuing in the 2020s, with students contributing to "one of the longest data sets on a vertebrate animal in the world", including some data from the 1930s. A study of the Savannah sparrow has been ongoing since 1987.

Due to the prevalence of seals in the waters around Kent, Bowdoin routinely sends out patrols to discourage poachers.

In 1991, the director of the station Nat Wheelwright was criminally charged and faced jailtime and a substantial fine for transporting deceased bird specimens found on the island, which is Canadian, into the United States - leading to "uneasiness and even anger" within the ornithological community.

Approximately two dozen researchers, graduate students and Bowdoin College undergraduates participate each summer. As of 2023 research done on Kent Island had resulted in over 220 published scientific papers.
