= John Rockefeller (disambiguation) =

John D. Rockefeller (1839–1937) was an American business tycoon.

John D. Rockefeller or John Rockefeller may also refer to:

- John D. Rockefeller Jr. (1874–1960), son of John Sr.
- John D. Rockefeller III (1906–1978), son of John Jr., grandson of John Sr.
- Jay Rockefeller, or John D. Rockefeller IV (1937-2026), son of John III, grandson of John Jr., great-grandson of John Sr.
- John Sterling Rockefeller (1904–1988), American philanthropist, conservationist, and amateur ornithologist
