= Charles Ellsworth Huntington =

American ornithologist (1919–2017)

- Born: December 8, 1919; Boston, Massachusetts
- Died: January 2, 2017 (aged 97); Harpswell, Maine
- Education: Yale University
- Father: Ellsworth Huntington
- Scientific career
- Workplaces: Bowdoin College
- Thesis: The subspecies of the purple grackle Quiscalus quiscula (1952)
- Doctoral advisor: S. Dillon Ripley

Charles Ellsworth (Chuck) Huntington (December 8, 1919 – January 2, 2017) was an American ornithologist and educator. He was the director of the Bowdoin Scientific Station on Kent Island, New Brunswick from 1953 until 1986. His study of the island's Leach's storm petrel population, which he began in the 1950s and continued until his death in 2017, has resulted in "one of the longest data sets on a vertebrate animal in the world".

== Early life and education ==
Huntington was born in Boston. His father was the geographer Ellsworth Huntington. He attended the Foote School in New Haven, the Pomfret School and Hopkins School in Connecticut, and the Cranbrook School in England. He studied biology at Yale University and graduated with a Bachelor of Science degree in 1942.

After graduating from Yale, Huntington served in the United States Naval Reserve during World War II. His service included postings to Espiritu Santo and the USS Lexington. He resumed his studies at Yale in 1946 and earned a PhD in Biology in 1952. His doctoral thesis, supervised by S. Dillon Ripley, was on grackle hybridization.

== Academic and research career ==
Huntington was hired in 1953 to teach biology at Bowdoin College, replacing the retired ornithologist Alfred Otto Gross. He became an associate professor in 1964 and full professor in 1970. He directed the Bowdoin Scientific Station on Kent Island from 1953 until his retirement from Bowdoin College in 1986.

Huntington first visited Kent Island in 1948 with Raymond Paynter, a fellow Yale graduate student who had done research there as a Bowdoin undergraduate. On becoming director of the research station there, he intended to study the phenomenon of delayed breeding in herring gulls but switched his focus to the Leach's storm petrel, which also breeds on the island, because of "the irresistible charm of this bird". He started banding breeding petrels and nestlings in their underground nests in 1955. This project, which continues into the 2020s, has tracked the petrel population's characteristics, including "age, eating patterns, breeding and homing instincts". Huntington's lengthy research, in collaboration with other scientists, resulted in numerous scientific publications including, at the end of his life, a coauthored paper entitled "The rate of telomere loss is related to maximum lifespan in birds", which was presented at the Society for Integrative and Comparative Biology in 2017 and published in 2018 in Philosophical Transactions of the Royal Society B.

Huntington died at Harpswell, Maine on 2 January 2017 at the age of 97.
