= Charles Huntington =

Charles Huntington may refer to:

- Charles Pratt Huntington (1871–1919), American architect
- Charles A. Huntington (1891–1973), American football player
- Sir Charles Huntington, 1st Baronet (c. 1833–1906), British member of parliament for Darwen
- Charles W. Huntington (1854–1942), American Congregational minister
- Charles Ellsworth Huntington (1919–2017), American ornithologist and educator

== See also ==
- Charles Huntington Whitman (1873–1937), American professor of English
