= The Cambridge School of Weston =

High school in Weston, Massachusetts, US

Coordinates: 42°23′8.5″N 71°16′20.0″W

- Weston, Massachusetts; United States

Information
- Type: Private
- Motto: "Truthe and Gentil Dedes"
- Established: 1886
- CEEB code: 222350
- NCES School ID: 00603304
- Head teacher: Lise Charlier
- Enrollment: 315 students (2025-2026)
- Student to teacher ratio: 7:1
- Campus: Suburban, 65 acres
- Colors: Blue and Yellow
- Mascot: Gryphon
- Website: www.csw.org

The Cambridge School of Weston (also known as CSW or The Cambridge School) is an independent high school in Weston, Massachusetts, United States. In the 2025-2026 school year, the school had 315 students in grades 9 to 12, with approximately 70% day students and 30% boarding students.

== History ==
The school was founded in 1886 as The Cambridge School for Girls at 20 Mason Street in Cambridge, Massachusetts, by Arthur and Stella Gilman, who had previously helped found Radcliffe College, as a preparatory school for Radcliffe. In 1918, The Cambridge School for Girls merged with the Boston-based Haskell School, and was renamed The Cambridge-Haskell School. Lebanese-born poet Kahlil Gibran, an "intimate friend" of headmistress Mary Haskell, designed a ring for her students depicting a "flower" "growing" in an open "hand".

In 1931, the school was moved 20 miles (32 km) to its present campus in Weston under the direction of then-head of school John French, became coeducational, and was renamed a final time as The Cambridge School of Weston (CSW). A follower of educational reformer John Dewey, French put in place many of the progressive educational underpinnings that still guide the school, such as a focus on the whole student, experiential learning, community involvement, and a low student-to-faculty ratio. In 1939, the school implemented a form of community self-governance modeled after the traditional New England town meeting. Following Robert's Rules of Order, the entire school community, including students, meet to propose and debate school rules and policies, elect representatives to school committees, and decide on other relevant topics to the community. The Cambridge School Town Meeting continues to be a central part of the school's community governance to the present day.

== Academics ==
The school adopted the Module System, implemented in 1973 by then Head of School Bob Sandoe. The goal of the Module, or "Mod" System, is to provide a framework to allow students to focus on fewer subjects more intensively during a given term. The academic year is divided into six terms (known as modules) of six weeks apiece. A school day consists of four class blocks of 90 minutes each, with some classes spanning several consecutive blocks. Students take up to three academic and one extracurricular class per mod. Some classes, such as those in mathematics or a foreign language, continue for multiple mods. No two students have the same schedule; every student's schedule is unique to themself. Students submit what classes they would like to enroll in, and the faculty works on their schedule to fit their electives into their schedule, along with the required classes each class must participate in.

== Tuition ==
The Cambridge School of Weston's tuition for the 2025-2026 school year is $77,800 for boarding and $62,980 for day students. About 25% of students receive financial aid.

== Initiatives ==
The Cambridge School of Weston finished building a Green building called the Garthwaite Center for Science and Art, with a dedication ceremony and day of environmental education events on October 20, 2007.

== Athletics ==
The Cambridge School of Weston offers the following interscholastic sports: Soccer, Cross country running, Field hockey, Basketball, Baseball, Ultimate, Volleyball, Tennis, and Girls' lacrosse.

Additional fitness courses offered include: Yoga, Rock climbing, Fencing, Bicycling, Weight training, Golf, Table tennis, Dance, and Martial arts.

== Notable alumni ==
- Miguel Arteta, director
- Max Geller, internet provocateur
- Hilaria Baldwin, businesswoman and reality television performer
- Louisa Bertman, illustrator
- Josh Clayton-Felt, singer-songwriter
- Andras Jones, actor, singer-songwriter
- Jennifer Coolidge, actress
- Robert M. Cunningham, cloud physicist
- Aprille Ericsson-Jackson, aerospace engineer
- Ian Falconer, illustrator and author; noted for his Olivia the Pig series of children's books
- Zach Feuer, artist
- Paul Michael Glaser, actor who played Starsky in Starsky and Hutch
- Aspen Gollan, woodworker and furniture maker
- Susanna Kaysen, author of Girl, Interrupted
- Helen Keller, author, political activist, lecturer, and the first deaf-blind person to earn a Bachelor of Arts degree
- Nia King, queer art activist and author
- Stephin Merritt, singer-songwriter
- Hamilton Morris, journalist
- David Mugar, businessman and philanthropist
- Steve Mumford, artist
- Daniel José Older, writer
- Esther Pasztory, art historian
- Douglas Preston, author
- Jonathan Roberts, screenwriter The Lion King, Monsters, Inc.
- Jonas Wood, artist
- Eric von Hippel, economist
- Kelly Zutrau, singer-songwriter and lead of Wet
- Prabda Yoon, Thai writer, novelist, filmmaker, artist, graphic designer, magazine editor, screenwriter, translator and media personality
- Jesse Novak, composer and songwriter, best known for Bojack Horseman and The Mindy Project
- Suzanne M. Rivera, president of Macalester College
