= Lady Franklin Island =

Island in Nunavut, Canada

Native name: Kitigtung
- Location within Nunavut Location within Canada

Geography
- Location: Davis Strait
- Coordinates: 62°56′N 63°44′W
- Archipelago: Arctic Archipelago

Administration
- Canada
- Nunavut: Nunavut
- Region: Qikiqtaaluk

Demographics
- Population: Uninhabited

Lady Franklin Island (Inuktitut: Kitigtung), is an uninhabited Baffin Island offshore island located in the Arctic Archipelago in the territory of Nunavut. The island lies in Davis Strait, 25 mi (40 km) from Hall Peninsula. There are at least seven smaller, unnamed islands off its northwest shore.

It was named by Arctic explorer Charles Francis Hall as a tribute to Sir John Franklin's wife Lady Franklin.

The island offers an abundance of bears, caribou (tuktoo), ducks, seals, and walrus.
