= Aspen Golann =

Aspen Golann is an American woodworker who produces furniture.

== Early life and education ==
Originally from Newton, Massachusetts, Golann attended the Cambridge School of Weston, graduating in 2005. Golann grew up in the workshop of her grandfather, inventor Herbert Goldberg, son of inventor Emanuel Goldberg.

After trying out various other crafts, including bookbinding and weaving, and teaching art and literature at private high schools, Golann began practicing woodworking a few months before her 30th birthday. In 2018, Golann attended the North Bennet Street School to study 17th- and 18th-century-style American furniture making. While studying at Penland School of Craft in North Carolina, she invented an enameling technique to create multi-colored patterns for the glass doors of a bookcase and clock. In 2020, Golann founded The Chairmaker's Toolbox, a project intended to increase educational equity and opportunity in the field of Green woodworking and Windsor chair making.

== Career ==
Aspen Golann is a furniture maker, artist and educator whose work explores gender and power through the manipulation of iconic American furniture forms. Trained as a 17th-19th century woodworker, Aspen engages the moral complexity of reproduction furniture by appropriating the aesthetics and antiquarian processes of early America to illustrate racial, gender and social injustice endemic to the time. Golann's works include a variety of Windsor chairs, playful and intricate home wears, 17-19th century reproduction pieces with contemporary aesthetics and detailing with conceptual undertones including a Sheraton chair featuring a face in marquetry gazing from its splat and a black Windsor settee with water-gilded details. Golann serves on the board of A Workshop of Our Own (Baltimore, MD) and as an ambassador to Fine Woodworking magazine and has written for the magazine on a variety of topics including articles on brush making, and video instruction on airbrushing for furniture.

In February 2019 she earned her degree in furniture making from The North Bennet Street School. In May 2019, she became the Wood Studio Coordinator at the Penland School of Craft. In 2020, two of her cabinets and a clock appeared in an exhibition at Blowing Rock Art & History Museum. A July 2020 article on Fatherly.com included Golann on a list of five woodworkers to check out. In September, Golann received the John D. Mineck Furniture Fellowship from the Society of Arts + Crafts, a $25,000 award to support an early-career furniture artist. Aspen maintains an active teaching practice and in September 2021, with the help of the Mineck Fellowship, Golann launched the nonprofit The Chairmakers Toolbox— a project that provides free tools, education, and mentorship for BIPOC, nonbinary, and female toolmakers seeking to build sustainable businesses, and organizes for retiring woodworkers to donate tools to early-in-their-career furniture makers. In support of the project, she has partnered with Winterthur Museum, Fine Woodworking Magazine, A Workshop of Our Own, The Furniture Society and chair makers around the country. In 2023, Golann won the Maxwell/Hanrahan Award in Craft and stated that she plans to use much of the $100,000 award to support the work of The Chairmakers Toolbox.

In 2021, Golann received first place in the Annual Juried Woodworking Exhibition at the Wharton Esherick Museum. In Spring of 2022 Claire Voon wrote a "New & Noteworthy" article on Golann in American Craft - her work was also featured in The Queue in February 2022.

In January 2022, Golann was the artist in residence at the San Diego State University School of Art and Design and in 2022 completed a Critical Craft Fellowship at Winterthur Museum exploring the physical and social history of the Windsor chair.

She has taught classes on sculptural brush making at institutions including Lie Nielsen Toolworks, Penland School of Craft, Anderson Ranch Arts Center, the Port Townsend School of Woodworking, Haystack Mountain School of Crafts, the Florida School of Woodwork, and the Donkey Mill Art Center in Hawaii.
