= Peter Cunningham (photographer) =

American photographer

Peter Cunningham is an American photographer who is best known for his concert and theatre photographs made in New York City in the 1970s and 1980s.

== Family and education ==
Cunningham is the eldest son of the American cloud physicist Robert M. Cunningham and his Austrian-born wife Claire Steinhardt, a chemist and high school teacher. He graduated from Lincoln-Sudbury Regional High School in 1965 and studied anthropology at Wesleyan University before taking up photography in 1969. Cunningham acted as assistant to Henri Cartier-Bresson in 1975 when the French photographer spent several weeks touring and photographing in New Jersey. He lives on Bleecker Street in NoHo with his wife, Ara Fitzgerald.

== Music photography ==
In his early career Cunningham specialized in photographing musicians and theatrical performances and concerts. Cunningham was the house photographer at the New York cabaret The Bottom Line. In 1973, as his first professional assignment, he shot Bruce Springsteen's first publicity photographs for Columbia Records. In 1982 Cunningham shot the first publicity photographs of Madonna for Warner Brothers. A number of images from the photo session were lost and were exhibited for the first time in 2016 after having been rediscovered.

== Other work ==
Cunningham is a Zen practitioner and a student of Bernie Glassman of the Zen Peacemaker Order. He participated in and photographed the first "interfaith meditation retreat" at the Auschwitz concentration camp led by Glassman in 1997. Cunningham began visiting Grand Manan Island in the Bay of Fundy with his parents as a small child and returns to the island annually to photograph.
