= Lincoln Keith Ingersoll =

Canadian writer and educator (1914–1993)

Lincoln Keith Ingersoll CM
- Born: June 30, 1914; Grand Manan, New Brunswick
- Died: December 16, 1993 (aged 79); Fredericton, New Brunswick
- Resting place: Maple Grove Cemetery, Grand Manan
- Occupations: Teacher, writer, historian, museum director

Lincoln Keith Ingersoll CM (30 June 1914 – 16 December 1993) was a Canadian teacher, writer, historian and museum director. He was born in Seal Cove on the island of Grand Manan, New Brunswick. While still in his teens he started contributing local news items to the Saint Croix Courier, a weekly newspaper published in St. Stephen, New Brunswick. In 1934, he became the paper's regular Grand Manan correspondent at a salary of $10 a month. He continued in this role for 21 years. A prolific writer and author of several books, Ingersoll wrote that other than manual labour in the Grand Manan fisheries, "everything I have done by way of employment, or community service, since that early beginning in journalism has been made easier by my intimate acquaintance with the typewriter".

He served in the Canadian army in World War II as a dental technician and returned to Grand Manan, where he became a teacher of business education at the newly opened Grand Manan High School in 1948. He taught school for 21 years, becoming the principal of the Grand Manan school district.

Ingersoll was a leader in the effort to establish the Grand Manan Museum, which opened in 1967. He served as the museum's first curator and executive director. He went on to become the curator of Canadian history at the New Brunswick Museum in Saint John, New Brunswick, and in 1973 he was named director of the New Brunswick Museum. He was also director of museums for the province of New Brunswick, a position from which he retired in 1979. On retirement he was named emeritus director of museology in the province's department of historical resources.

Ingersoll was named a Member of the Order of Canada on October 27, 1993, in the field of Arts (Writing). The official citation called him a "treasure trove of the history of his home community of Grand Manan and of the province of New Brunswick", and stated that "his writings have illuminated the past, while his enthusiasm as a teacher, columnist and curator has instilled in others, especially young people, an appreciation and interest in the Canadian mosaic". Ingersoll died in Fredericton on 16 December 1993.

A major expansion of the Grand Manan Museum in 1998 was named the L. Keith Ingersoll Memorial Wing in his honour. The expansion doubled the size of the museum and allowed wheelchair access to the building for the first time.
