= Robert M. Cunningham =

American meteorologist

Robert M. (Bob) Cunningham (July 1, 1919 – April 15, 2008) was an American cloud physicist. He specialized in the study of fog, running a weather research station on Kent Island in the Bay of Fundy for over 60 years.

Cunningham was born in Cambridge, Massachusetts. He attended Shady Hill School and the Cambridge School of Weston, where he built his first weather station. He first went to Bowdoin College's Scientific Research Station on Kent Island as a high school student in the summer of 1937. He set up a weather station and began collecting samples of fog water which were later subjected to chemical analysis. His first scientific paper on the subject was published in 1941.

Cunningham attended the Massachusetts Institute of Technology (MIT) from 1938 to 1942 and worked on an aircraft icing research team in the university's meteorology department during World War Two. He joined MIT's Weather Radar Research project as a graduate student when it was founded in 1946. He acted as the airborne observer in a program that involved comparing radar observations with those taken from airplanes during storms. His findings helped to establish that the "bright band" observed on radar displays was an artifact of melting snowflakes.

Cunningham earned a PhD from MIT in 1952 and in 1953 became head of airborne cloud physics research at the Air Force Cambridge Research Laboratories. After retiring in 1979 Cunningham spent several years with the World Meteorological Organization as field director of an international research project on precipitation enhancement.

Throughout his career and until his death in 2008 Cunningham retained responsibility for the Kent Island weather station he had first set up in 1937. Observations were taken during the summer by staff and students of the Bowdoin College scientific station, and during the rest of the year by the station's resident warden. Cunningham contributed his analysis of decades of daily fog samples from Kent Island to research published in the 1980s on the effect of acid rain on forests.

Cunningham lived in Lincoln, Massachusetts from 1948 until his death. He married Claire Steinhardt, an Austrian-born chemist and high school teacher, in 1945. They had three sons, one of whom is the photographer Peter Cunningham.
