= Edward Howe Forbush =

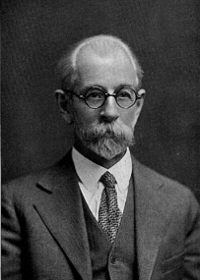
- Born: April 24, 1858; Quincy, Massachusetts
- Died: March 27, 1929 (aged 70); Westborough, Massachusetts
- Occupation: Ornithologist
- Known for: Ornithology; Wildlife conservation
- Spouse: Etta L. Hill

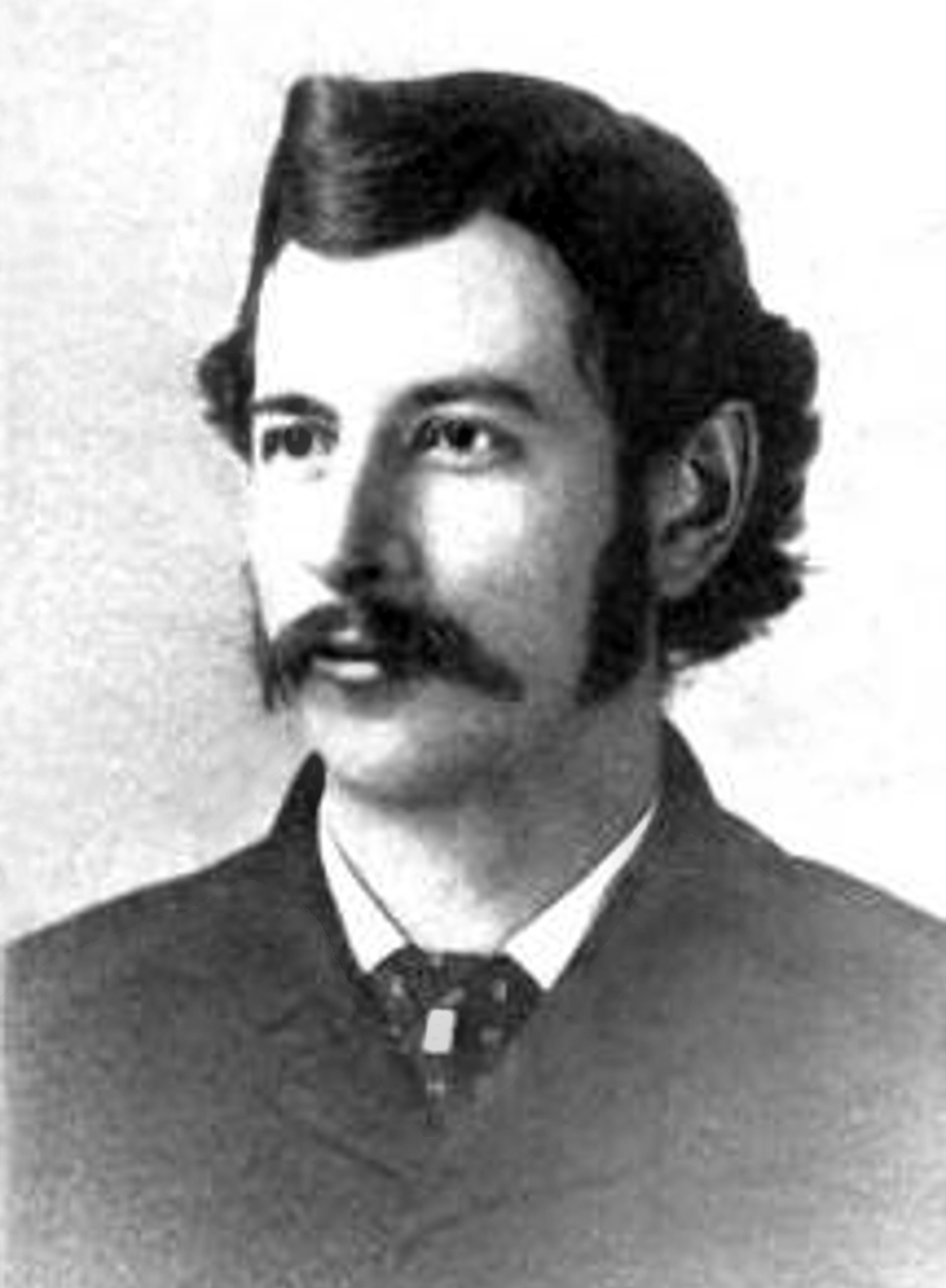
Forbush ca. 1886

Edward Howe Forbush (April 24, 1858 – March 7, 1929) was a ornithologist and a prolific writer who lived in Massachusetts, best known for his book Birds of New England.

== Biography ==
Born in Quincy, Massachusetts, in 1858, he was a precocious naturalist. His family moved to West Roxbury, when he was seven. As an older child, he conducted field studies of area wildlife and also studied taxidermy. Once again, his family moved to Worcester, where he became a member of the Worcester Natural History Society, and began to publish the results of his studies. At the age of sixteen he was appointed Curator of Ornithology of the Society's museum.

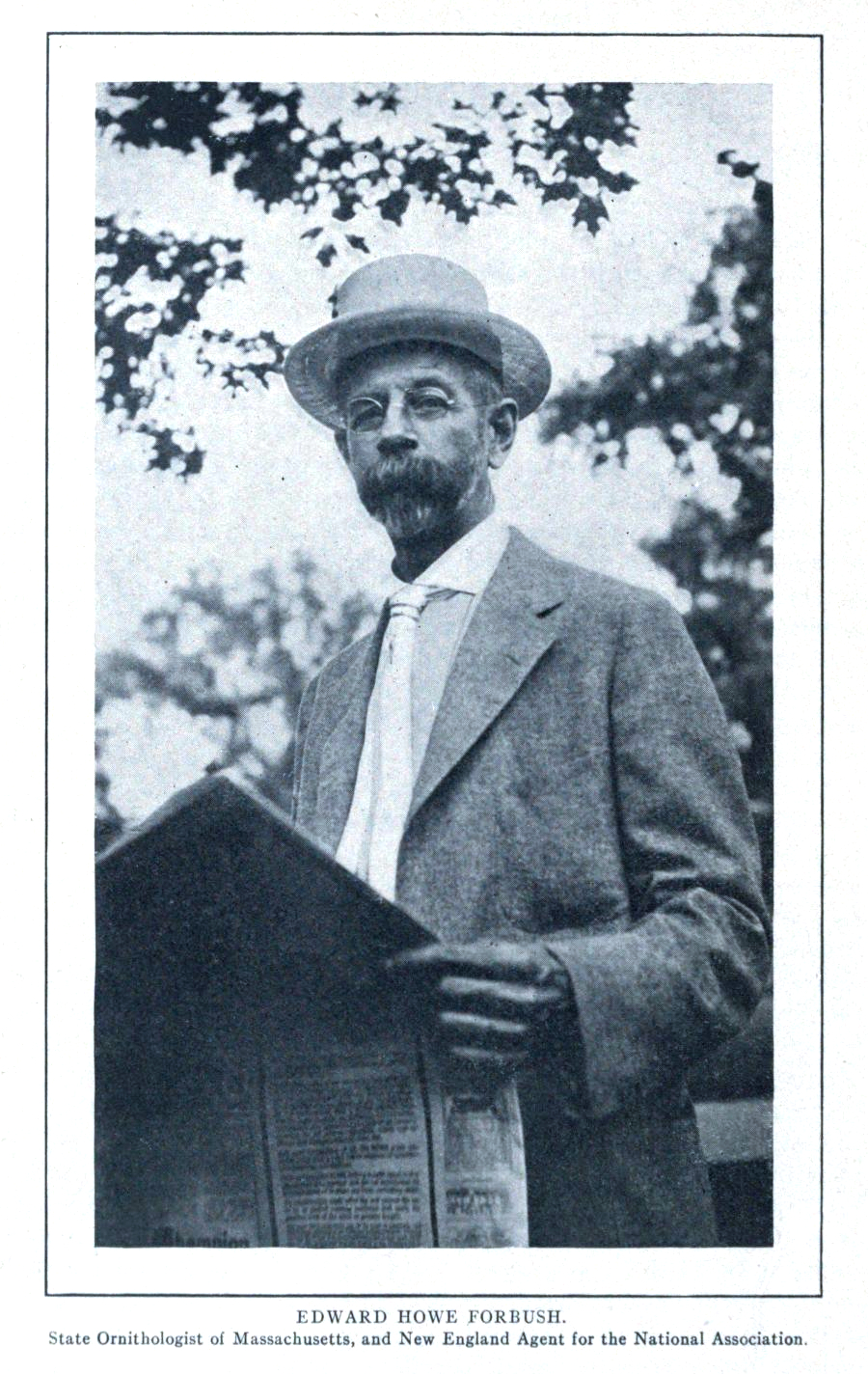
Forbush in 1917

When he was nineteen, he mounted an expedition to Florida — this would be the first of many trips he took around the United States to study birds.

In 1893, Forbush was appointed Ornithologist to the Massachusetts State Board of Agriculture. His primary studies at this time were "economic ornithology" — that is, determining whether a given species of bird was beneficial or detrimental to agriculture.

In 1908 he became the Massachusetts State Ornithologist.

He was a founder of the Massachusetts Audubon Society. He was also first president of the Northeastern Bird-Banding Association (now the Association of Field Ornithologists).

His work "Birds of Massachusetts (and Other New England States)" is a three-volume set of books published 1925–1929 by the Massachusetts Department of Agriculture. Title notwithstanding, it was and remains a valuable reference regarding not just New England birds but also in regard to ornithology of the Northeast and farther afield.

He was also known for his studies of the Heath Hen and his attempts to save the species.

He died in Westborough in 1929. His wife donated a glass case containing artistically arranged ornithological specimens to the Westborough Public Library, with a plaque reading: "Presented by Etta L. Forbush in memory of her husband Edward Howe Forbush. All specimens collected prepared and mounted by Mr. Forbush at the age of eighteen." In 1931, The Forbush Bird Club of Worcester, Mass., was established in his memory.

== Selected publications ==
- Useful Birds and their Protection (1907)
- Rats and Rat Riddance (1915)
- A History of the Game birds, Wild Fowl and Shore Birds of Massachusetts and Adjacent States (1916)
- The Domestic Cat (1916)
- Birds of Massachusetts and Other New England States (1925)
