= Grand Manan Museum =

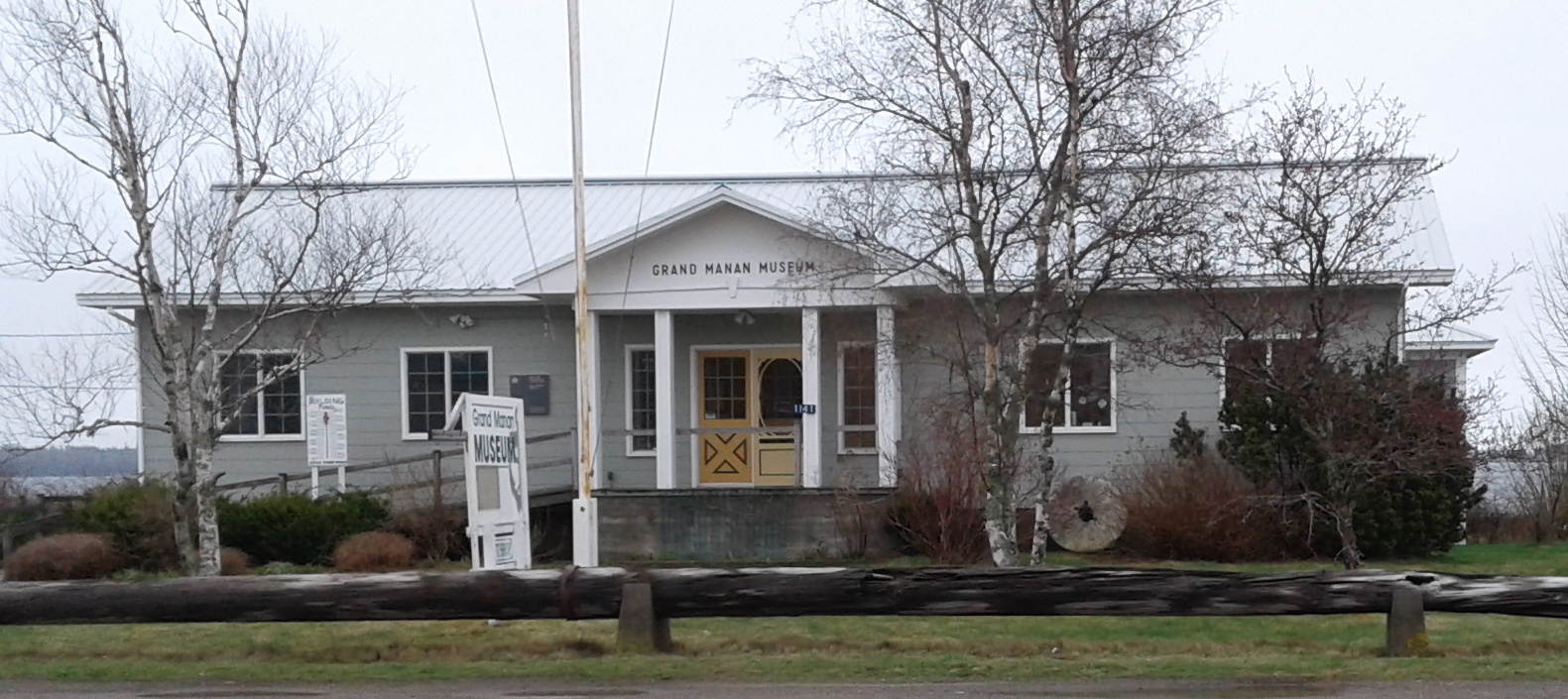
- Established: 23 June 1967
- Location: 1141 Route 776 in Grand Harbour, New Brunswick
- Coordinates: 44.6865°N 66.7651°W
- Type: Local museum
- Director: M.J. Edwards
- Website: www.grandmananmuseum.ca

The Grand Manan Museum (French: Musée de Grand Manan) is located in Grand Harbour on Grand Manan Island, New Brunswick, Canada. The Museum collects, preserves and displays pieces that represent the history of the Village and Island. Through programs and exhibits, the museum encourages an appreciation for the community heritage, culture and physical environment. The Museum houses more than 18 permanent exhibits, including the notable Allan Moses Bird Gallery which has over 300 taxidermy birds. The Museum has a tax-free gift shop which contains many handmade and interesting items that have a connection with the island such as prints, wood carvings and a vast selection of postcards by local artists and photographers.

== History ==
L. Keith Ingersoll and other residents of Grand Manan formed the Gerrish House Society in 1961 with the goal of building a museum that would preserve local history and ensure a permanent home for the taxidermy bird collection which Allan Moses had donated to the community in 1951. Gerrish House Society Inc. was incorporated as a non-profit charitable organization on 5 June 1962, with the purpose of "building and operating a museum and science centre". The project was accepted as a Centennial project by Canada's Centennial Commission and received capital funding from the federal government. Funding was also received from the provincial government and donations from the public. The Grand Manan Museum opened on 23 June 1967. The Gerrish House Society was renamed Grand Manan Museum Inc. in June 1974.

== Archives ==
The Grand Manan Archives is a project associated with the Museum and the Grand Manan Historical Society. It has numerous records, maps, textual documents, artwork and photography.

== Permanent collections and exhibits ==
=== Allan Moses Bird Collection ===
This is the largest collection in the Museum with over 300 stuffed birds of the Grand Manan archipelago displayed in 18 cases. The naturalist and conservationist Allan Moses of Grand Manan was a skilled taxidermist, as were his father and grandfather, who had settled on Grand Manan in 1872. All three generations contributed to this collection of the birds of Grand Manan and the surrounding area. The gallery also contains material relating to the Grand Manan Museum's founder, the writer and educator L.K. Ingersoll.

=== Walter B. McLaughlin Marine Gallery ===
This two-story gallery was built around the second order Fresnel lens from Gannet Rock Lighthouse. Its exhibits explore the history of ship building, lighthouses and their keepers, island ferries and the island's earliest settlers. Displays in the gallery explain the processes of weir fishing, scallop and ground fish dragging, and lobster fishing.

The Marine Gallery contains a shipwreck exhibit, which commemorates the hundreds of vessels wrecked on and near Grand Manan. Among the wrecks described in this exhibit are those of the Lord Ashburton (1857), Queen (1841), Turkish Empire (1879), Gypsum King (1906) and Hestia (1909).

The Gallery's lower level houses a reconstructed fishermen's shed and an exhibit of lobster trap buoys, including historic wooden buoys.

=== L. Keith Ingersoll Wing ===
Ingersoll was one of the first directors of the Grand Manan Museum as well as an historian, fisherman, and newspaper correspondent. This wing of the Museum has a resource library, lecture hall, meeting room and the L.K Ingersoll Memorial Gallery intended primarily for temporary exhibits.

The Dark Harbour Hermits and Dulsing on Grand Manan
The Ingersoll Memorial Gallery houses a permanent exhibit on "The Dark Harbour Hermits and Dulsing on Grand Manan". The "hermits", Lucy and Darby Greene, were two brothers who spent the summers in the 1920s and 1930s harvesting dulse in Dark Harbour, and whose talents for entertaining visitors made them a "major Grand Manan tourist attraction" at the time.

Geology of Grand Manan
The Museum's permanent "Geology of Grand Manan" exhibit is housed in the Ingersoll Wing. This exhibit was renewed and updated in 2011 by geologist and island resident Greg McHone.

=== Deep Cove School House ===
The one-room Deep Cove school operated from 1869 to 1947. The building was moved to its current location on the Grand Manan Museum property in 1963.

=== Other permanent exhibits ===
Willa Cather
The main foyer exhibit explores the life of Willa Cather, an American writer who won the 1923 Pulitzer Prize for Fiction for her novel "One of Ours". Willa Cather and her partner Edith Lewis spent many summers on the island.

1929 Island Kitchen
This exhibit holds a collection of artifacts, donated by islanders, that were used in Grand Manan homes before the island had electric power.

The Graham Hearse
Three generations of the Graham family provided funeral services to the island. In 2010, the hearse was donated to the Museum.
