= Emanuel Goldberg =

Israeli physicist and inventor

- עמנואל גולדברג
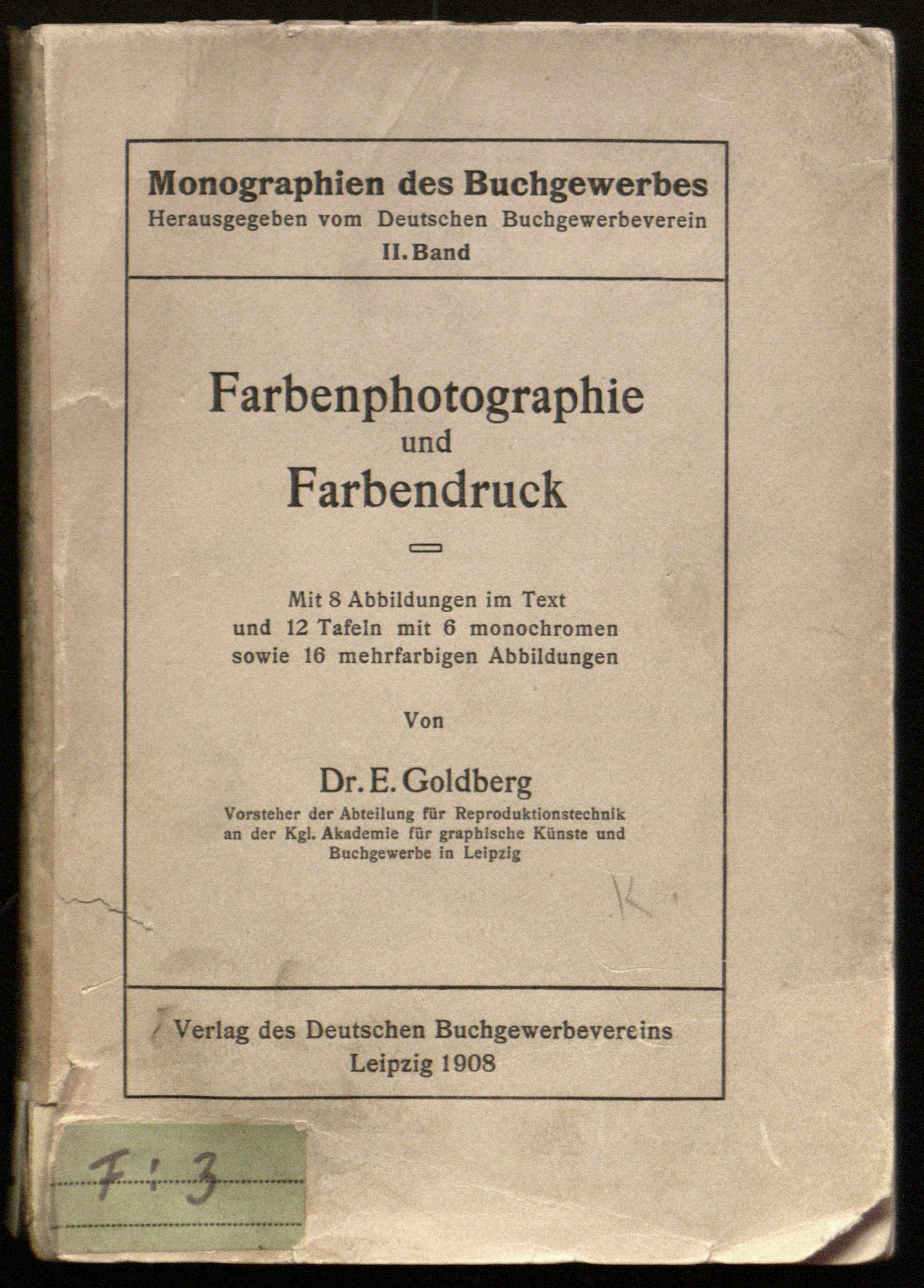
- Frontpage of the publication: "Farbendruck und Farbenphotographie". Published 1908 in Leipzig.
- Born: August 31, 1881; Moscow, Russia
- Died: September 13, 1970 (aged 89); Tel Aviv, Israel
- Education: University of Moscow, University of Leipzig
- Known for: Microdots, Kinamo movie camera, Contax 35 mm camera, early search engine, equipment for sensitometry
- Awards: Israel Prize in exact sciences (1968)
- Scientific career
- Fields: Physics, Photographic technology
- Workplaces: Zeiss Ikon, Electro-Optical Industries ("El-Op")

Emanuel Goldberg (Hebrew: עמנואל גולדברג; Yiddish: עמנואל גאָלדבערג; Russian: Эмануэль Гольдберг; 31 August 1881 – 13 September 1970) was a Russian-Israeli physicist and inventor. He was born in Moscow and moved first to Germany and later to Israel. He described himself as "a chemist by learning, physicist by calling, and a mechanic by birth." He contributed a wide range of theoretic and practical advances relating to light and media and was the founding head of Zeiss Ikon, the famous photographic products company in Dresden, Germany. His inventions include microdots, the Kinamo movie camera, the Contax 35 mm camera, a very early search engine, and equipment for sensitometry.

== Biography ==
Goldberg was born in Moscow on 31 August 1881 (19 August 1881 in the Old Style, Julian calendar, sometimes given in error as 1 September) the son of Grigorii Ignat'evich Goldberg, a distinguished Colonel (Polkovnik) in the Tsar's military medical corps and his wife Olga Moiseevna Grodsenka. Earlier interested in engineering, he studied Chemistry at the University of Moscow and at several German universities, and remained in Germany after 1904 to avoid antisemitism in Russia. In 1906 he received a Ph.D. from the University of Leipzig for research at the Institute for Physical Chemistry, led by Wilhelm Ostwald on the kinetics of photochemical reactions. After a year as assistant to Adolf Miethe in the Photochemistry Laboratory at the Technical University in Charlottenburg, Berlin, he became head of the photographic department of the Royal Academy of Graphic Arts and Bookcraft, in Leipzig from 1907 to 1917.

In 1917, Goldberg was recruited by the Carl Zeiss Stiftung to become a director of its photographic products subsidiary Ica (Internationale Camera Aktien Gesellschaft) in Dresden where he introduced the spring-driven Kinamo movie camera. In 1926 a "Fusion" of four leading photographic firms (Contessa, Ernemann, Ica and Goerz) formed Zeiss Ikon under Goldberg's leadership until he was kidnapped by Nazis in 1933 and fled to Paris. After four years working for Zeiss subsidiaries in France, Goldberg moved to Palestine in 1937 where he established a laboratory, later called Goldberg Instruments, which became the Electro-Optical Industries ("El-Op") in Rehovot. A photograph taken 1943 by John Phillips for Life Magazine shows Goldberg in his workshop in Palestine. He retired in 1960 but continued his research and died in Tel Aviv on 13 September 1970.

== Early inventions ==
Goldberg patented improved methods for electroplating zinc on iron in 1902 and published numerous technical papers on improved printing techniques, reducing moiré effects in half-tone printing, photoengraving and other topics. In 1910 he became well known for an improved method for making neutral gelatin wedges ("Goldberg wedge") that was widely used in sensitometry and the Densograph, an instrument that greatly reduced the labor required to measure the characteristic curves of photographic emulsions.

At Ica, foreseeing a growing market in amateur and semi-professional movies, he designed an extremely compact 35 mm movie camera, the Kinamo, introduced in 1921 with a spring motor attachment added in 1923 to allow flexible handheld filming. Goldberg made films of himself and his family as promotional shorts and, in 1927, a skiing drama, "Ein Sprung . . . Ein Traum." The Kinamo was used by Joris Ivens and other avant-garde and documentary filmmakers in the late 1920s and early 1930s.

In 1925 Goldberg demonstrated and published a technique for making microdot (Mikrat nach Goldberg) at a resolution equivalent to the text 50 complete Bibles per square inch. This invention has been widely attributed to a mythical "Professor Zapp" based on J. Edgar Hoover's erroneous article in the April 1946 Reader's Digest, probably a confusion with Kurt Zapp who trained German spies in microdot photography during the Second World War. In 1937, Goldberg presented a paper at the World Congress of Universal Documentation on an early copying camera he had invented.

At Ica and Zeiss Ikon, Goldberg was involved in many innovations and led the design of famous Contax 35 mm still camera.

Goldberg was best known for his extensive studies in sensitometry summarized in his book Der Aufbau des photographischen Bildes (1922) and the "Goldberg Condition" (Goldberg Bedingung), a design principle for high quality reproduction in two stage, negative-positive photographic processes better known in English as "the gamma rule."

Goldberg and his former teacher and collaborator Robert Luther were instrumental in the acceptance at the International Congress of Photography in Dresden in 1931 of the widely adopted German national film speed standard DIN 4512. At the same Congress Goldberg introduced his "Statistical Machine," a document search engine that used photoelectric cells and pattern recognition to search the metadata on rolls of microfilmed documents (US patent 1,838,389, 29 December 1931). This technology was used in a variant form in 1938 by Vannevar Bush in his "microfilm rapid selector," his "comparator" (for cryptanalysis), and was the technological basis for the imaginary Memex in Bush's influential 1945 essay "As we may think."

== Educational and service activities ==
In Germany Goldberg was noted for his educational displays at exhibitions, served as consultant on aerial photography in the First World War, and was a consultant to the Carl Zeiss firm in Jena. In Palestine and later Israel he was deeply engaged as an advisory to both civilian and military spheres. The apprenticeship scheme that he introduced in Tel Aviv provided advanced technical skills to many who went on to develop the Israeli high tech industry.

== Awards ==
In 1968, Goldberg was awarded the Israel Prize, in exact science.

== Personal life ==
On 28 June 1907 Goldberg married Sophie Posniak (28 August 1886 – 10 December 1968). They had a son, Herbert Goldberg (born 20 November 1914) and a daughter Renate Eva, who later changed her name to Chava (born 19 September 1922). Chava married Mordechai Gichon in 1948. Goldberg's great-granddaughter is woodworker Aspen Gollan.

In 1990 Chava Gichon (Tel-Aviv) requested restitution of the property in the Oeserstraße 5 in Dresden, which Goldberg as director of Zeiss-Ikon had bought in 1927, but the real estate office did not approve an intended agreement with the owner at that time in August 1995.

== Work ==
=== Publications (selected) ===
- Goldberg, Emanuel: Beiträge zur Kinetik photochemischer Reaktionen. Dissertation. Universität Leipzig 1906.
- Goldberg, Emanuel: Farbenphotographie und Farbendruck. Verlag des Deutschen Buchgewerbevereins. Leipzig 1908.
- Goldberg, Emanuel: Densograph, ein Registrierapparat zur Messung der Schwärzung von photographischen Platten. In: Eder, Josef Maria (Hrsg.): Jahrbuch für Photographie und Reproduktionstechnik. Knapp. Halle a. S. 1910. S. 226–233.
- Goldberg, Emanuel: The Densograph. In: British Journal of Photography. 57 (26. Aug. 1910), S. 649–651.
- Goldberg, Emanuel: A new process of micro-photography. British Journal of Photography. 73 (13 August 1910) 462–65.
- Goldberg, Emanuel: Die Herstellung neutral grauer Keile und verlaufender Filter für Photometrie und Photographie. In: Eder, Josef Maria (Hrsg.): Jahrbuch für Photographie und Reproduktionstechnik. Knapp. Halle a. S. 1911. S. 149–155.
- Goldberg, Emanuel: Die Grundlagen der Reproduktionstechnik : In gemeinverständlicher Darstellung. Knapp. Halle a. S. 1912.
- Goldberg, Emanuel: Führer durch die Gruppe Wissenschaftliche Photographie : Internationale Ausstellung für Buchgewerbe und Graphik Leipzig 1914. Knapp. Halle a. S. 1914.
- Goldberg, Emanuel: Wissenschaftliche Photographie. In: Internationale Ausstellung für Buchgewerbe und Graphik Leipzig 1914 : Amtlicher Katalog. Leipzig 1914. S. 160–165.
- Goldberg, Emanuel: Gruppe VIII Reproduktionstechnik. In: Internationale Ausstellung für Buchgewerbe und Graphik Leipzig 1914 : Amtlicher Katalog. Leipzig 1914. S. 185–187.
- Goldberg, Emanuel: Der Aufbau des photographischen Bildes : Teil 1 Helligkeitsdetails. Knapp. Halle a. S. 1922.
- Goldberg, Emanuel: A new process of micro-photography. In: British Journal of Photography. 73 (13. August 1925), S. 462–465.
- Goldberg, Emanuel: Kinematographische Wolkenaufnahmen. In: Photo-Technik. Nr. 7. Zeiss Ikon AG. Dresden 1926. S. 145–148.
- Goldberg, Emanuel: Kinamo S 10. In: Photo-Technik. Nr. 1. Zeiss Ikon AG. Dresden 1929. S. 18–19.
- Goldberg, Emanuel: The retrieval problem in photography. In: Journal of the American Society for Information Science. 43 (4). 1932. S. 295–298.
- Goldberg, Emanuel: Deutscher Vorschlag zur sensitometrischen Normung. In: Eggert, J./Biehler, A. v. (Hrsg.): Bericht über den VIII. Internationalen Kongress für Wissenschaftliche und Angewandte Photographie : Dresden 1931. Barth/Leipzig 1932. S. 100–101.
- Goldberg, Emanuel: Die Grundlagen des Tonfilms. In: Eggert, J./Biehler, A. v. (Hrsg.): Bericht über den VIII. Internationalen Kongress für Wissenschaftliche und Angewandte Photographie : Dresden 1931. Barth/Leipzig 1932. S. 213–214.
- Goldberg, Emanuel: Das Registrierproblem in der Photographie. In: Eggert, J./Biehler, A. v. (Hrsg.): Bericht über den VIII. Internationalen Kongress für Wissenschaftliche und Angewandte Photographie : Dresden 1931. Barth/Leipzig 1932. S. 317–320.
- Goldberg, Emanuel: The retrieval problem in photography (1932). In: Journal of the American Society for Information Science 43 (4): S. 295–298.
- Goldberg, Emanuel: Precision instruments industry. In: Hobman, J. B. (Hrsg.): Palestine's economic future : A review of progress and prospects. Lund, Humphries and Co. London. 1946. S. 238–243.

=== Patents (selected) ===
- Goldberg, Emanuel: 1903. GB. GB000190207923A. An Improvement in Electrolytically Coating Iron with Zinc.
- Goldberg, Emanuel: 1903. US. US000000733028A. Electrolytically Coating Iron with Zinc.
- Goldberg, Emanuel/Nowicki, Martin: 1926. US. US000001573314A. Enlarging camera.
- Goldberg, Emanuel/Nowicki, Martin: 1928. US. US000001667110A. Film box.
- Goldberg, Emanuel: 1929. US. US000001704189A. Motion-picture camera driven by alpha spring mechanism.
- Goldberg, Emanuel/Fischer, Otto: 1929. US. US000001713277A. Film-spool construction.
- Goldberg, Emanuel: 1929. FR. FR000000657787A. Machine statistique.
- Goldberg, Emanuel: 1929. GB. GB000000288580A. Improvements in or relating to adding, sorting, statistical and like machines.
- Goldberg, Emanuel: 1930. US. US000001747705A. Film-feeding device.
- Goldberg, Emanuel/Fischer, Otto: 1930. US. US000001750401A. Cinematograph camera with clockwork driving mechanism.
- Goldberg, Emanuel: 1930. US. US000001772774A. Cinema camera.
- Goldberg, Emanuel/Fischer, Otto: 1930. US. US000001779468A. Cinematographic camera.
- Goldberg, Emanuel: 1931. US. US000001789679A. Cinematographic camera.
- Goldberg, Emanuel: 1931. US. US000001802598A. Film magazine.
- Goldberg, Emanuel/Fischer, Otto: 1931. US. US000001804500A. Film box.
- Goldberg, Emanuel: 1931. US. US000001830602A. Distance releasing device for moving picture cameras driven by a spring mechanism.
- Goldberg, Emanuel: 1931. US. US000001838389A. Statistical machine.
- Goldberg, Emanuel: 1934. US. US000001973203A. Nipkow disk for television.
- Goldberg, Emanuel: 1939. DE. DE000000670190A. Vorrichtung zum Aussuchen statistischer und buchhalterischer Angaben.
- Goldberg, Emanuel: 1940. DE. DE000000691162A. Statistische Maschine.
- Goldberg, Emanuel: 1940. DE. DE000000697265A. Vorrichtung zum Aussuchen statistischer Angaben.
- Goldberg, Emanuel: 1940. US. US000002225433A. Photographic camera for flexible materials sensitive to light.
- Goldberg, Emanuel: 1953. GB. GB000000690268A. Improvements in or relating to refractometers.
- Goldberg, Emanuel: 1953. US. US000002652744A. Photographic copying apparatus.
- Goldberg, Emanuel: 1955. DE. DE000001706938U. Blendschutzvorrichtung fuer Kraftfahrzeuge.
- Goldberg, Emanuel/Goldberg, Herbert: 1956. US. US000002768553A. Refractometers.
- Goldberg, Emanuel/Goldberg, Herbert: 1961. US. US000002972926A. Refractometers.

=== Patents (Links) ===
- International Patents: Deutsches Patent- und Markenamt
- US-American Patents: freepatentonline

== See also ==
- List of Israel Prize recipients
