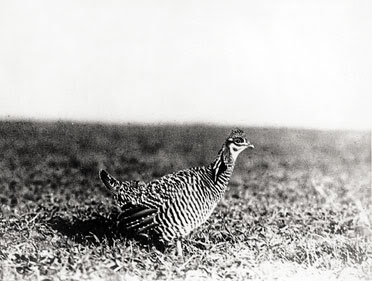
- Live male specimen photographed c. 1909

Conservation status
- Presumed Extinct (1932) (NatureServe)

Scientific classification
- Kingdom: Animalia
- Phylum: Chordata
- Class: Aves
- Order: Galliformes
- Family: Phasianidae
- Genus: Tympanuchus
- Species: T. cupido
- Subspecies: †T. c. cupido

Trinomial name
- †Tympanuchus cupido cupido (Linnaeus, 1758)

= Heath hen =

Extinct subspecies of bird

The heath hen (Tympanuchus cupido cupido) is an extinct subspecies of the greater prairie-chicken (Tympanuchus cupido), a large North American bird in the grouse family. It became extinct in 1932.

Heath hens lived in the scrubby heathland barrens of coastal North America from southernmost New Hampshire to northern Virginia in historical times. The other subspecies of prairie-chickens inhabited prairies from Texas north to Indiana and the Dakotas (and earlier in mid-southern Canada).

Heath hens were extremely common in their habitat during colonial times; because of this, they were hunted by settlers extensively for food. It is speculated that the Pilgrims' first Thanksgiving dinner featured heath hens and not wild turkey. By the late 18th century, the heath hen had a reputation as poor man's food for being so cheap and plentiful; somewhat earlier, Thomas L. Winthrop had reported that they lived on the Boston Common (presumably when it was still used to graze cows and other agricultural activities), and that servants would sometimes bargain with a new employer to not be given heath hen for food more often than two or three days a week.

== Taxonomy ==
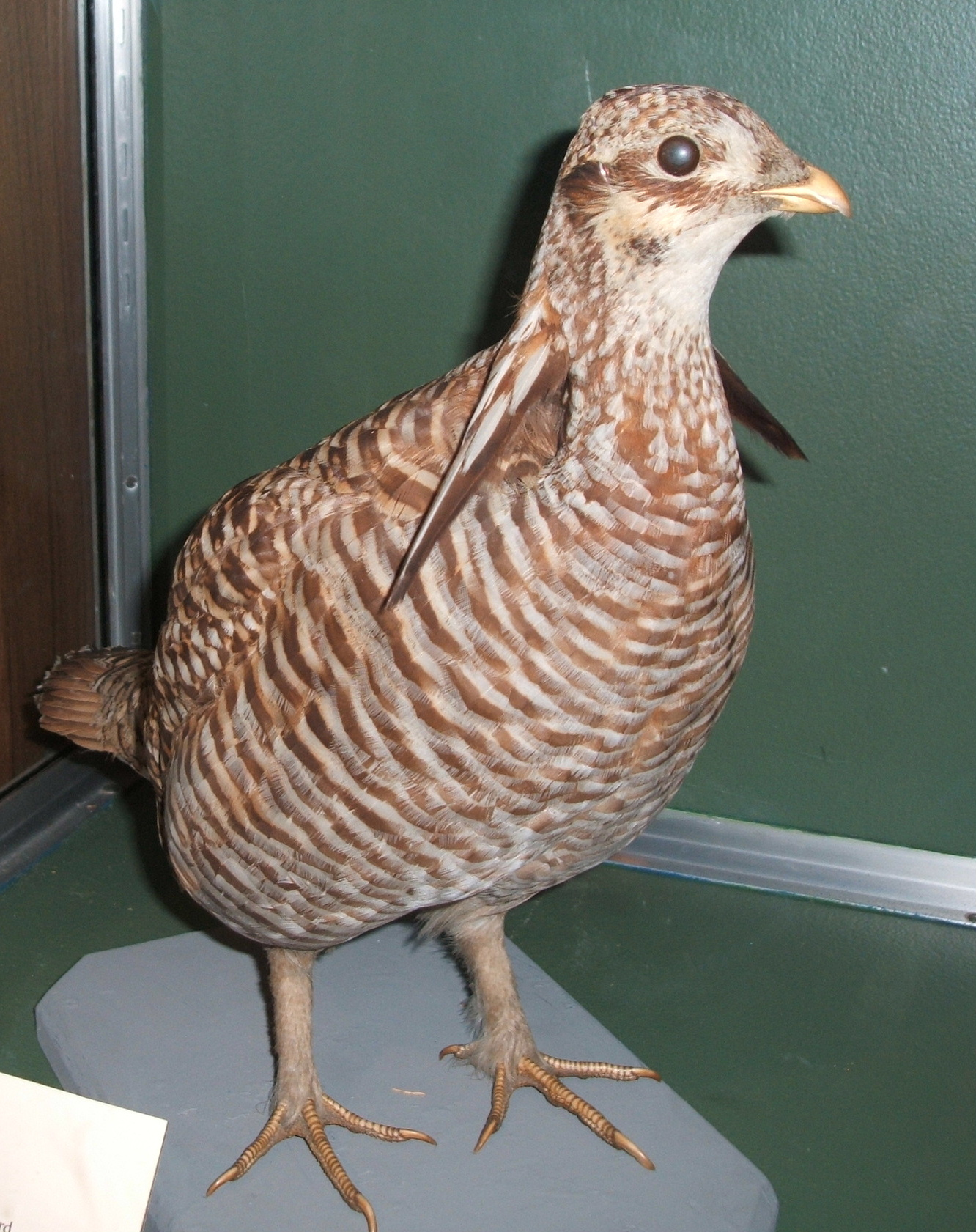
Stuffed female specimen at Boston Museum of Science

A first mtDNA D-loop haplotype comparison between heath hen specimens and prairie-chickens brought the unexpected result that all heath hens tested formed a group very distinct from mainland birds, being most similar genetically to greater prairie-chickens from Wisconsin. A more recent study of the same parameter by Johnson and Dunn verified these results, but disagreed in the placement of the heath hen respective to its relatives, suggesting a closer relationship with the lesser prairie-chicken (Tympanuchus pallidicinctus) instead.

However, Johnson and Dunn caution against reading too much into these results: while the lesser prairie-chicken is considered a distinct species and the apparently equally-genetically distinct heath hen would thus likewise deserve species status, mtDNA haplotypes in small populations that have undergone bottlenecks are likely to show higher divergence than they would judging from taxonomic status alone, due to genetic drift. Thus, given the fact that all heath hen specimens from known localities studied by Johnson and Dunn are Martha's Vineyard birds (where the carrying capacity may never have exceeded several thousand, due to the limited space and limited genetic exchange with the mainland), it is possible that the low genetic diversity and apparent distinctness of the heath hen are a result of the small number of useful specimens being predominantly from a small island population.

Prairie-chickens were indiscriminately introduced to the Eastern Seaboard after the heath hen was gone from the mainland, but failed to thrive. There exist a considerable number of supposed heath hen specimens in public collections today, but many (all mainland specimens and those with insufficient locality information) cannot be unequivocally assumed to be heath hens. For example, a mere seven unequivocal heath hen eggs – equivalent to a very small clutch – are known to be held in public collections today. That the genus Tympanuchus apparently evolved rapidly and therefore has high morphological, but low genetic, distinctness between taxa further complicates research.

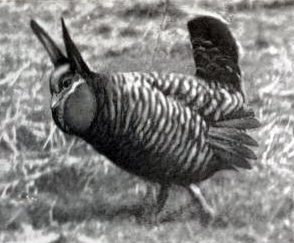
Photo of a displaying male from 1900

It is also important to note that while introductions of the greater prairie-chicken (Tympanuchus cupido pinnatus) were occurring, true heath hens (Tympanuchus cupido cupido) are distinct enough in morphological features to be separated from the greater prairie-chicken. Taking a generous starting date of around 1810 when introductions could have started, and taking into account that Lewis and Clark did not even return from their expedition until 1806, gives roughly a 60-year period of possible introductions. From an evolutionary biology aspect, in a 60 (or even 100) year timeframe, a subspecies like the greater prairie-chicken would not have been able to evolve to the point where it would so closely resemble the native heath hen that it could not be distinguished.

A prime example of this would be in opposing the lesser prairie-chicken, which differs from the greater prairie-chicken in being smaller, lighter, and having less distinct barring, to the heath hen, which was smaller, darker, and had more distinct barring, meaning that the lesser prairie-chicken can be readily distinguished from the greater prairie-chicken both morphologically and genetically (much like the heath hen), even if it were found in an area that the greater prairie-chicken inhabited.

The apparent distinctness of the species and the failure of the early introductions raises the question of whether the heath hen was uniquely (by comparison with its relatives) adapted to the more oceanic climate and more forested habitats of its former area of occurrence. As a consequence, any future attempt to establish a population of the western birds on Martha's Vineyard could be bound to fail due to competition for funding and other resources, therefore jeopardizing the extant but much declined populations of the prairie-chickens. More research is necessary, for example by analyzing mainland specimens to determine whether they can be assigned to a taxon from molecular and morphological characters.

== Description ==
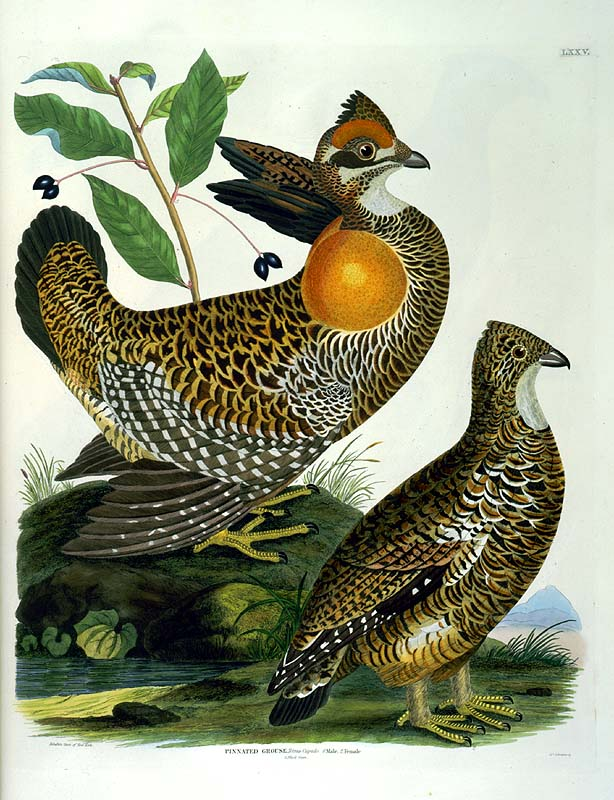
Male and female

Very similar to the other greater prairie-chicken subspecies of the Great Plains, but slightly smaller, the length of the bird was approximately 17 inches (43 cm) and weight was about two pounds (0.9 kg). A specimen weighing three pounds was claimed by Alexander Wilson but that figure was not verified by later ornithologists. Several key plumage characteristics separated the heath hens from their Great Plains counterparts: heath hens generally displayed a strong reddish hue in their plumage, especially in their crop area, and much thicker barring throughout the breast and sides. Their pinnae (horns) were generally pointed, and tails were a greyish brown.

== Extinction ==
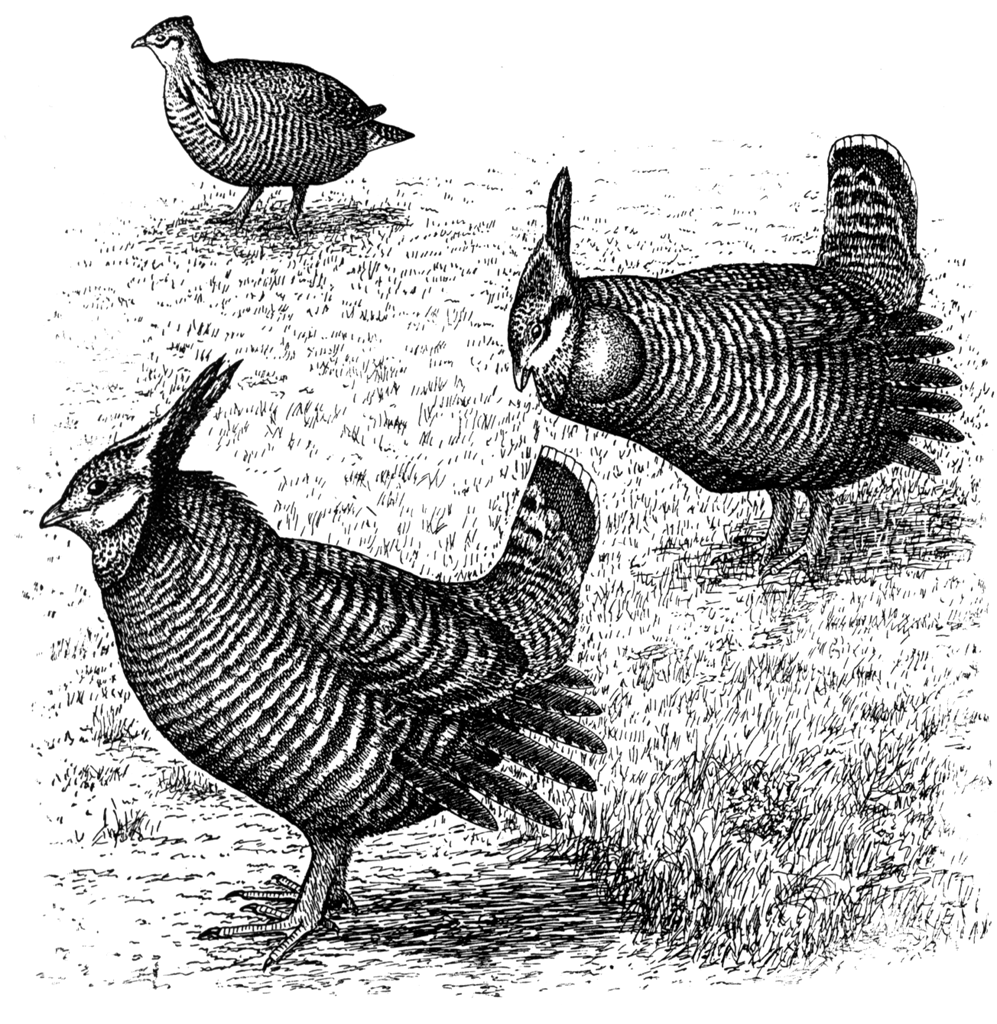
Two displaying males with a female in the background

Owing to intense hunting pressure and possible habitat loss, the population declined rapidly. Perhaps as early as the 1840s all heath hens were extirpated from the mainland. There were about 300 left on the island of Martha's Vineyard, off Massachusetts, but by 1890, this number had declined to 120–200 birds, mainly due to predation by feral cats and poaching. Ornithologists began tracking the population in 1908. These were protected by a hunting ban and by the establishment in 1908 of the "Heath Hen Reserve" (today the Manuel F. Correllus State Forest). With conservation efforts, the population grew from 100 to around 2,000 by 1916.

Heath Hens displaying on their lekking grounds in 1918

The 1916 nesting season was a disastrous series of events that ultimately led the species to its final decline. In 1916, a fire spread across approximately one-third of the island, killing about 80% of the heath hen population, with only 150 birds remaining. The following winter was harsh, and goshawks began moving into the island, further reducing the heath hens' numbers. Edward Howe Forbush noted that "fewer than 100 birds still lived" following these events. The remaining population of heath hens had a significantly male biased sex-ratio, leading to further complications in the upcoming years. In addition to other issues, the large male population resulted in overly-aggressive mating attempts, which harmed the females, as well as existing eggs. Captive breeding efforts were attempted, but some surviving males had undeveloped testes, either from an inadequate diet or because of captive-breeding practices. The species consequently faced great difficulty in resisting population shocks, such as epidemics of disease and harsh winters. The last record of any heath hen being born was 1924. In 1925, the Federation of the Bird Clubs of New England proffered $2,000 annually toward conservation efforts.

At the beginning of 1927, only 11 males and two females remained. Despite being afforded the best protection according to contemporary science, the number had declined to a handful, all males, by the end of the year. After December 8, 1928, apparently only one male survived. The endling was lovingly nicknamed "Booming Ben." He was last seen on his traditional lekking ground between West Tisbury and today's Martha's Vineyard Airport on March 11, 1932 – early in the breeding season - and thus presumably died, about 8 years old, days or only hours afterwards from unknown causes, with his body never being found. Footage of Booming Ben recorded by Alfred Otto Gross in the early 1930s was digitized in 2017; it is available from the Bowdoin College special collections.

Heath hens were one of the first bird species that Americans tried to save from extinction. As early as 1791, a bill "for the preservation of heath-hen and other game" was introduced in the New York State legislature. Some representatives misinterpreted the bill when it was read as an act to protect "Indians and other heathen." Although the legislation was passed, it turned out to be nearly impossible to enforce.

Although the effort to save the heath hen from extinction was ultimately unsuccessful, it paved the way for conservation of other species. The establishment of the reserve on the open shrubland of what was then called the Great Plain on the Vineyard may have accelerated the heath hen's extinction. Fires were a normal part of the environment, but with the attempt to suppress fires instead of enforcing ecological succession with controlled burns, open habitat quality decreased and undergrowth accumulated until a normally limited fire would have disastrous consequences, as it did in 1916. Lack of awareness of the region's historical fire ecology also led the state legislature to require firebreaks when protecting the heath hen.

Realizing the degradation that has affected the State Forest (and although it does hold some biodiversity, prevents it from being utilized to its full potential), reestablishment of the original shrubland/heath/woods mosaic and eventual introduction of the closely related greater prairie-chicken subspecies as an "umbrella species" that serves as an indicator of good habitat quality has been discussed since the late 1990s.

There are also research projects aiming at the de-extinction of the heath hen using DNA from preserved cells as a basis for restructuring the DNA of greater prairie-chickens, particularly by American non-profit organization Revive & Restore.

== See also ==
- List of extinct birds
- List of extinct animals
