= William Goodsell Rockefeller =

American businessman (1870–1922)

- Born: May 21, 1870; New York City, U.S.
- Died: November 30, 1922 (aged 52); New York City, U.S.
- Education: Yale University
- Spouse: Sarah Elizabeth Stillman
- Children: 5, including: Godfrey Stillman Rockefeller; James Stillman Rockefeller; John Sterling Rockefeller
- Parent(s): William Rockefeller; Almira Geraldine Goodsell
- Relatives: Rockefeller family

William Goodsell Rockefeller (May 21, 1870 – November 30, 1922) was an American businessman who was treasurer of the Standard Oil Company of New York and a member of the Rockefeller family.

== Early life ==
Rockefeller was born on May 21, 1870, in Manhattan, New York City. He was the third child of Standard Oil co-founder William Avery Rockefeller Jr. and Almira Geraldine Goodsell, who married in 1864. His uncle was John D. Rockefeller and his paternal grandfather was William Rockefeller Sr.

Rockefeller attended Yale University, where he was a member of Alpha Delta Phi, and graduated in 1892.

== Career ==
Although he was predicted by Thomas W. Lawson to be the future head of Standard Oil, the prediction did not prove true. Following his graduation from Yale, he suffered a serious attack of typhoid fever before entering 26 Broadway. Rockefeller was treasurer of the Standard Oil Company of New York for several years until his retirement in 1911.

Rockefeller served as a director of the Brooklyn Union Gas Company (of which he was also vice-president), the Inspiration Consolidated Copper Company, the New York Mutual Gas Light Company, the Oregon Short Line Railroad, the Oregon Railroad and Navigation Company, the Union Pacific Railroad, and the Consolidated Textile Company, of which he had only been elected a director shortly before his death in 1922.

== Personal life ==
On November 21, 1895, Rockefeller married Sarah Elizabeth "Elsie" Stillman, daughter of National City Bank president James Jewett Stillman and Sarah Elizabeth Rumrill. Rockefeller's father had become a large shareholder of the National City Bank and his alliance with the Stillman family was sealed by the marriage of his two sons with two Stillman daughters. Rockefeller's brother, Percy Avery Rockefeller, married Elsie's sister, Isabel Goodrich Stillman. Together, William and Elsie were the parents of four sons and a daughter:

- William Avery Rockefeller III (1896–1973), who married Florence Lincoln (1897–1998), sister of Frederic W. Lincoln IV, in 1918.
- Godfrey Stillman Rockefeller (1899–1983), who married Helen Gratz, brother-in-law of Edward H. Watson.
- James Stillman Rockefeller (1902–2004), who married Nancy Carnegie (1900–1994), a grandniece of Andrew Carnegie.
- John Sterling Rockefeller (1904–1988), who married Paula Watjen.
- Almira Geraldine Rockefeller (1907–1997), who married M. Roy Jackson in 1929. After his death in 1944, she remarried in 1945 to Samuel Weston Scott.

Rockefeller was a member of the Union Club of the City of New York, the Union League Club, the Metropolitan Club, and the University Club.

William Goodsell Rockefeller died of "double pneumonia" at his home, 292 Madison Avenue in Manhattan, New York City, on November 30, 1922, five months after his father. He was interred in the vault of the William Rockefeller Mausoleum at Sleepy Hollow Cemetery in Sleepy Hollow, New York.
