= Davis Strait =

Water between Greenland and Canada

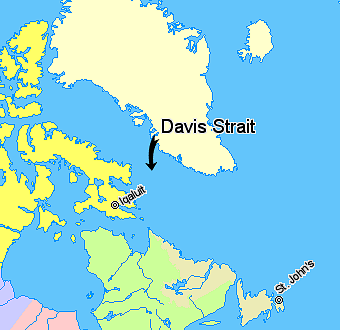
Davis Strait, lying between Greenland and Baffin Island in Nunavut, Canada Nunavut Quebec Newfoundland and Labrador Regions outside Canada (Greenland, Iceland)

Davis Strait (Danish: Davisstrædet; Inuktitut: ᕿᑭᖅᑖᓘᑉ ᐃᑭᖓ, romanized: Qikiqtaaluup Ikinga) is a southern arm of the Arctic Ocean that lies north of the Labrador Sea. It lies between mid-western Greenland and Baffin Island in Nunavut, Canada. To the north is Baffin Bay. The strait was named for English explorer John Davis (1550–1605), who sailed the area while seeking a route through the Northwest Passage, and by the 1650s it was used for whale hunting.

== Extent ==
The International Hydrographic Organization defines the limits of the Davis Strait as follows:

On the North. The Southern limit of Baffin Bay [The parallel of 70° North between Greenland and Baffin Land].

On the East. The Southwest coast of Greenland.

On the South. The parallel of 60° North between Greenland and Labrador.

On the West. The Eastern limit of the Northwestern Passages South of 70° North [the East coast of Baffin Island to East Bluff, its Southeastern extremity] and of Hudson Strait [A line from East Bluff, the Southeast extreme of Baffin Island (61°53′N 65°57′W), to Point Meridian, the Western extreme of Lower Savage Islands, along the coast to its Southwestern extreme and thence a line across to the Western extreme of Resolution Island, through its Southwestern shore to Hatton Headland, its Southern point, thence a line to Cape Chidley, Labrador (60°24′N 64°26′W)].

== Geology ==
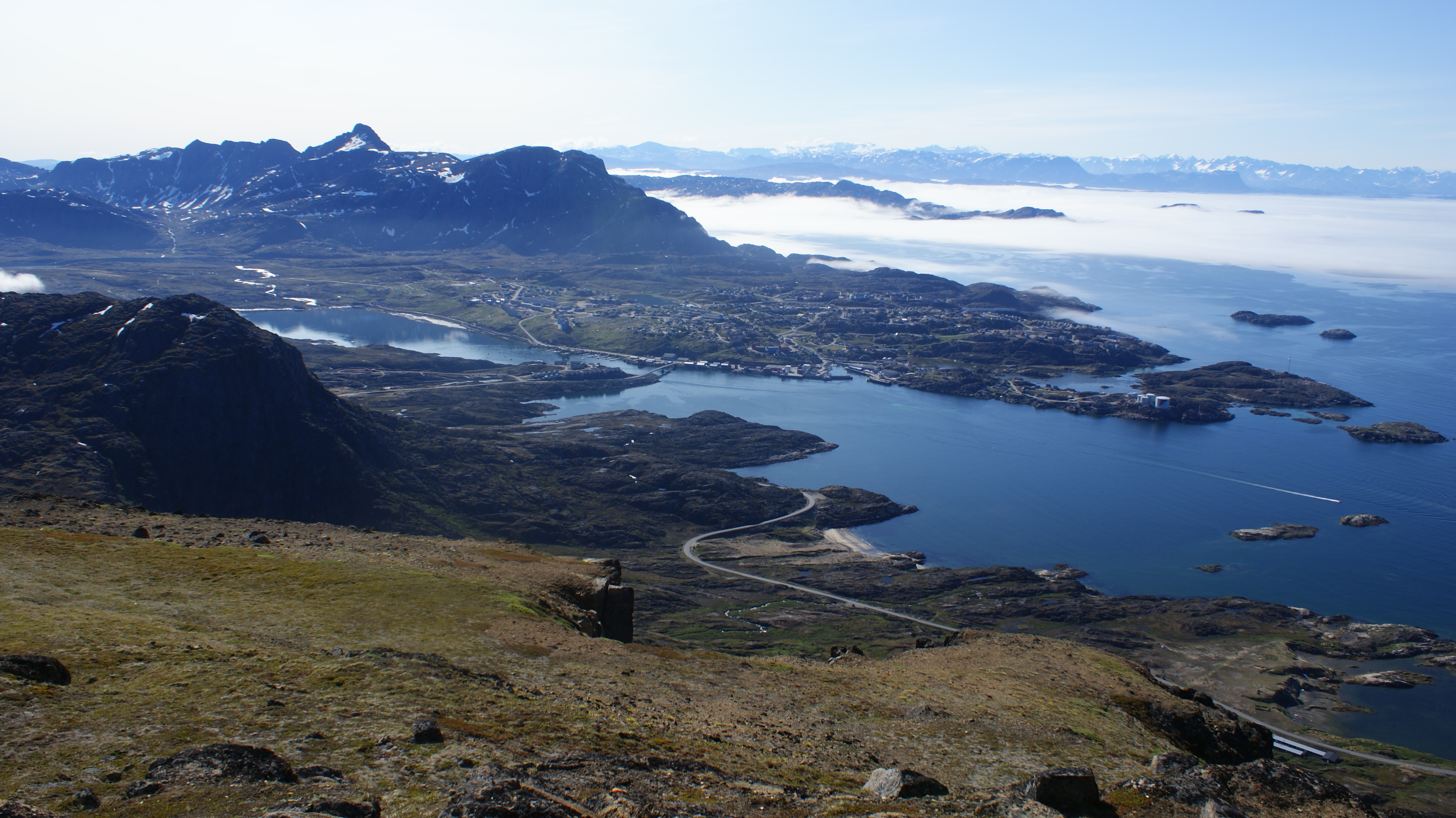
The coast of Davis Strait in western Greenland

The Davis Strait is underlain by complex geological features of buried grabens (basins) and ridges, formed by strike-slip faulting of the Ungava Fault Zone during Paleogene times about 45 million to 62 million years ago. The strike-slip faulting transferred plate-tectonic motions in the Labrador Sea to Baffin Bay. It is the world's broadest strait.

== Depth ==
With a water depth of between 1,000 and 2,000 m (3,300 and 6,600 ft) the strait is substantially shallower than the Labrador Sea to the south.

== Tides ==
The strait is famous for its fierce tides that can range from 9.1 to 18.3 m (30 to 60 ft), which discouraged many earlier explorers and were a challenge for whaling ships in the age of sail.

== Oil and gas ==
The United States Geological Survey has estimated that at least 13% of the world's undiscovered oil deposits and 30% of the world's undiscovered gas pockets are located in the Arctic, with the seas around Greenland potentially holding large amounts of natural gas and lesser amounts of crude oil and natural gas liquids. This has led Greenland's minister and provincial council to offer a large number of off-shore concessions to potential hydrocarbon (oil and gas) extraction. The largest concessions areas are located in seas west of Greenland, primarily the Davis Strait and Baffin Bay, but with several smaller concessions in the Greenland Sea in the east also.

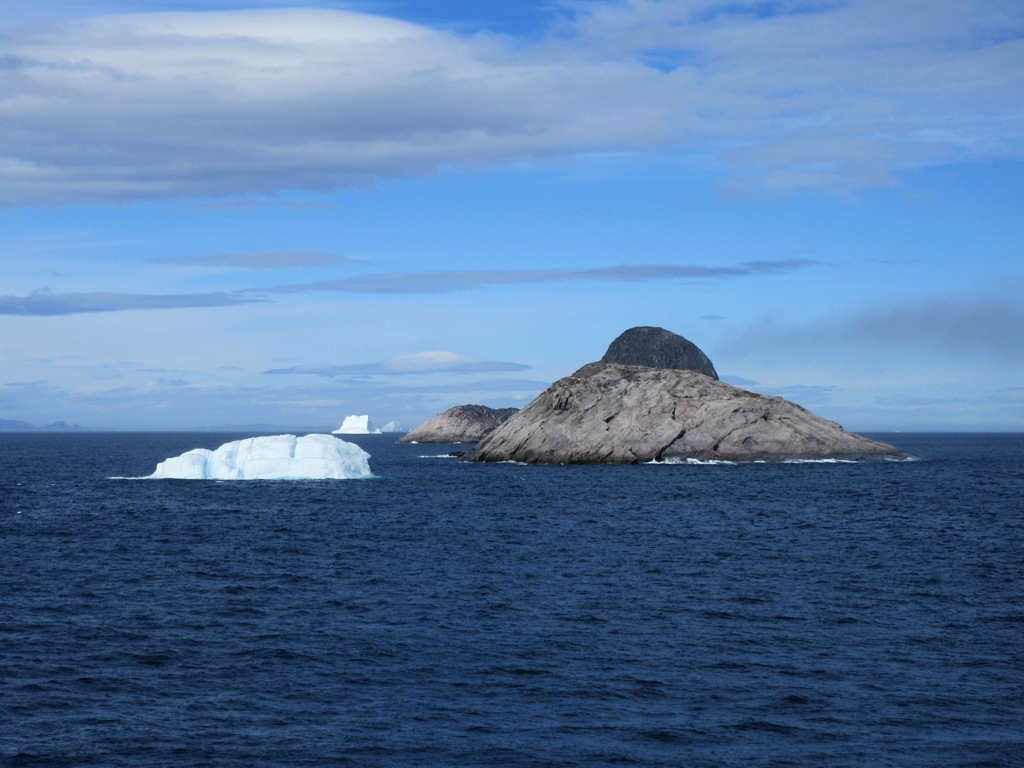
Icebergs around Lady Franklin Island, Nunavut.
