= Lower Savage Islands =

Island group in Nunavut, Canada

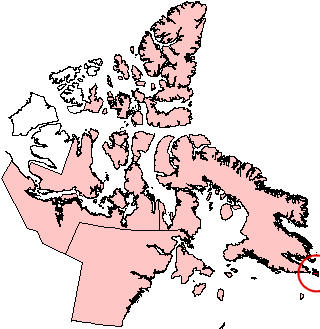
- Lower Savage Islands and neighbouring area (red circle at edge of map).

- Location within Nunavut Location within Canada

Geography
- Location: Davis Strait
- Coordinates: 61°48′N 65°48′W
- Archipelago: Arctic Archipelago

Administration
- Canada
- Nunavut: Nunavut
- Region: Qikiqtaaluk

Demographics
- Population: Uninhabited

The Lower Savage Islands are an uninhabited offshore island group of Baffin Island, located in the Arctic Archipelago in the territory of Nunavut. The islands lie in the Gabriel Strait, an arm of Davis Strait, northwest of Resolution Island, and west of Edgell Island.

A V-shaped lake lies 1.5 km (0.93 mi) south of Savage Harbour 61°49.15′N 65°42.62′W.
