= Allan Moses =

Canadian naturalist and taxidermist

- Born: Allan Leopold Moses; 1881; Grand Manan, New Brunswick, Canada
- Died: 23 March 1953 (aged 71–72); Grand Manan
- Resting place: North Head Cemetery, Grand Manan
- Occupation(s): Taxidermist, naturalist
- Known for: Instrumental in the conservation and revival of the Bay of Fundy common eider population
- Spouse: Mabel Kent (m. 1936)

Allan Leopold Moses (1881 – 1953) was a Canadian naturalist, taxidermist, and conservationist. A native of Grand Manan Island in the Bay of Fundy, he participated in scientific expeditions sponsored by the Cleveland Museum of Natural History and the American Museum of Natural History. By encouraging John Sterling Rockefeller to purchase Kent Island as a bird sanctuary in 1930, he was instrumental in the revival of the Bay of Fundy common eider population. His taxidermy collection of over 300 birds, all mounted by his grandfather, father, or himself and now displayed in the Grand Manan Museum, is one of the largest in Canada.

== Family and early life ==
Moses was born on the island of Grand Manan in 1881, the second of three children in his family. His father and grandfather were both taxidermists who collected and mounted birds as a hobby.

His grandfather, John Thomas Chiselden Moses, was born in England, where he learned taxidermy before emigrating to Canada as a young man. He later lived in Maine and finally settled in the village of North Head in 1872 with his wife and several of their ten children. He compiled a list of Grand Manan birds for a book published in 1876, in which he was described as "our Grand Manan ornithologist", who "makes birds his specialty and his pastime". John Thomas Moses died in 1885. His son John Russell Moses, born in 1853, was Allan Moses's father.

John Russell Moses learned taxidermy from his father and continued to build the family collection of mounted bird specimens, while prospering as a businessman. He was one of Grand Manan's major fish buyers, with a processing plant in North Head. Part of his business was selling the dried swim bladders of hake for the manufacture of isinglass. This was highly profitable, as the bladders were an otherwise useless by-product of processing.

John Russell taught his taxidermy skills to his son, Allan, and to his daughter Sarah, Allan's older sister. Allan Moses left school early and worked in his father's fish plant before becoming a fisherman himself. Sarah, who wrote for local newspapers under the name Sarah E. M. Smith, dealt with her father's business and natural history related correspondence and later helped Allan with his scientific reports and edited his travel journals for publication.

== The albatross ==
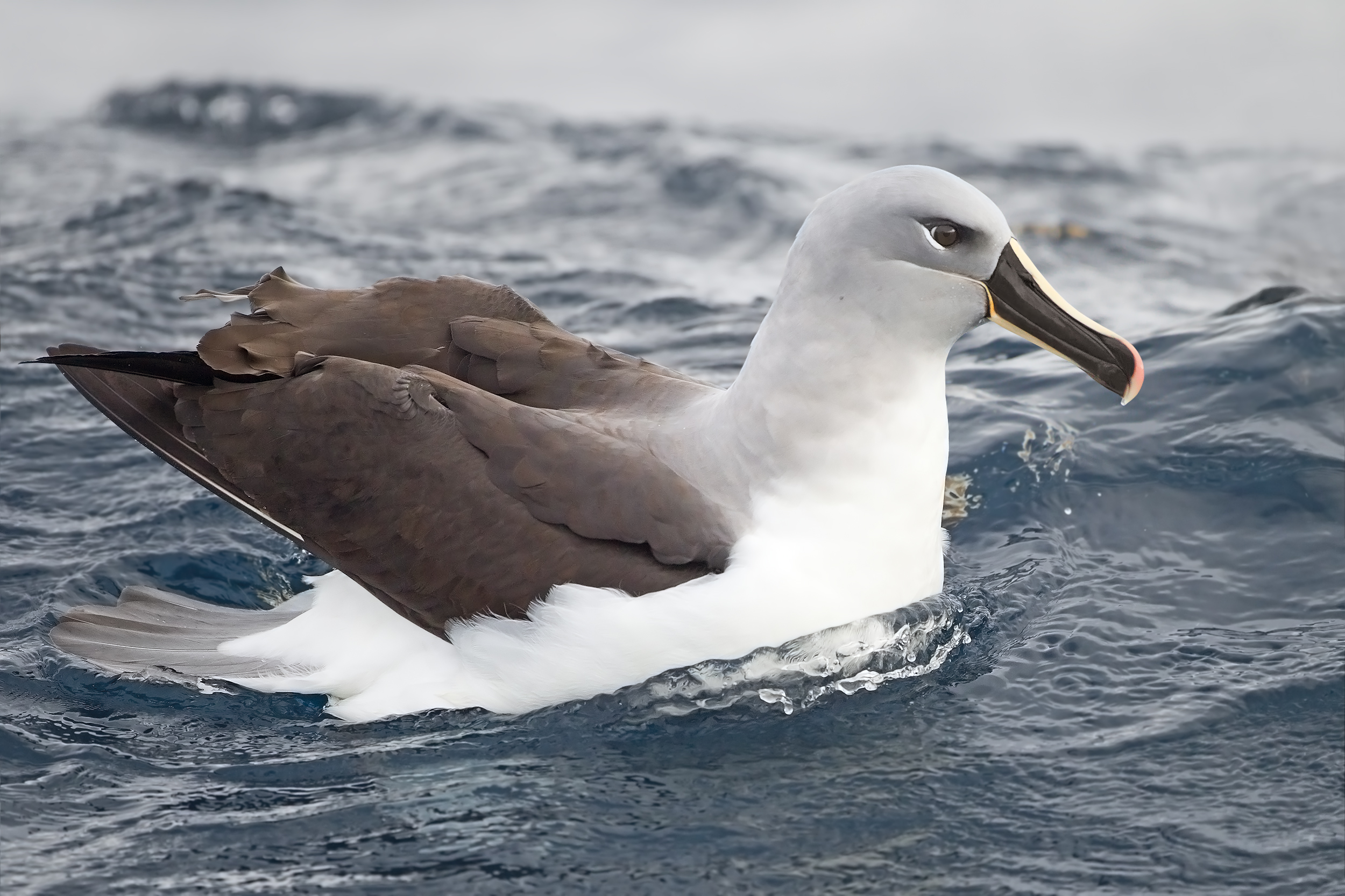
Grey-headed albatross

On August 1, 1913 a Grand Manan fisherman named Ernest Joy shot a large seabird near Machias Seal Island. He did not recognize the bird and took it to Allan Moses, who identified it as a Grey-headed albatross, a bird normally found in the Southern Ocean. It was to be the first of its species ever recorded in the American Ornithologists' Union's Checklist of North American Birds. Joy gave the albatross to Moses, who prepared a study skin from it.

The American ornithologist Leonard Cutler Sanford made two visits to Grand Manan, attempting to purchase the specimen for the American Museum of Natural History. For several years Moses refused to sell it, but eventually agreed to donate it to the museum in return for a chance to take part in a future scientific expedition.

== Cleveland Museum expedition ==
Moses spent the summer of 1923 in Labrador as a warden, enforcing the recently enacted Migratory Birds Convention Act. While there, he was invited by the Cleveland Museum of Natural History to join a collecting expedition to the South Atlantic. Moses was one of two taxidermists and collectors on the expedition, which left Long Island in November 1923 on board a three-masted schooner called the Blossom. They spent five months in the Cape Verde Islands, where Moses collected birds on eight of the ten islands and made about 800 study skins. The expedition then went on to Africa, arriving in Dakar in May 1924 and spending another five months there before returning to Cape Verde and then sailing to the island of Trindade, where they arrived in December 1924. From there they sailed to Rio de Janeiro, where Moses left the expedition, arriving back on Grand Manan in April 1925.

== American Museum of Natural History expedition ==
In 1928 and 1929 Moses served as the taxidermist on an ornithological expedition to Tanganyika and Belgian Congo to collect specimens for the American Museum of Natural History. The expedition was funded by the Rockefeller Foundation and led by John Sterling Rockefeller, along with Rockefeller's friend and Yale University classmate Charles B. G. Murphy. Their main goal was to find and collect the rare Grauer's broadbill, which was known only by one 1908 specimen in the Walter Rothschild Zoological Museum in England, and which had eluded collectors for twenty years.

They arrived in Dar es Salaam in August 1928 by steamer after a voyage through the Red Sea and down the east coast of Africa. On July 26, 1929, in a mountainous area at the northern end of Lake Tanganyika, Moses was the first to find and shoot a Grauer's broadbill. The party collected several more broadbill specimens and spent a further three months collecting before travelling down the Congo River to the port of Boma. Moses arrived back in Grand Manan in January 1930.

== Kent Island ==
Rockefeller held Moses in high regard and wanted to repay him personally for his work on the expedition, and particularly for collecting the first Grauer's broadbill. Moses suggested that Rockefeller buy a group of three small islands in the Bay of Fundy near Grand Manan and make them a bird sanctuary. By doing so, he could protect the eider ducks which nested there, and whose numbers had been declining seriously for several years until there were estimated to be at most 30 breeding pairs from the Gulf of Maine southward along the Atlantic Coast. Most of these nested on Kent Island, one of the three islands in question.

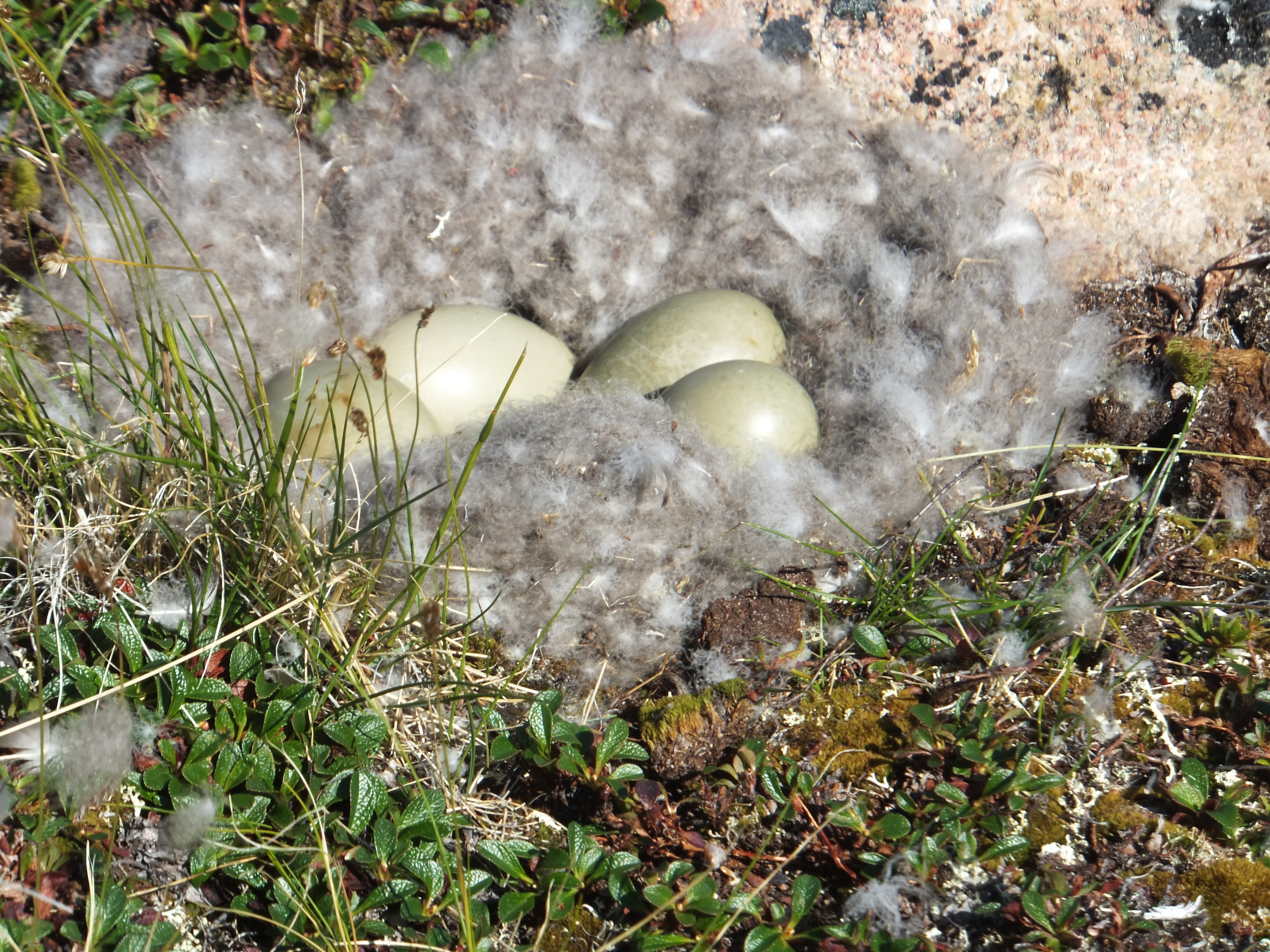
Eider nest

Rockefeller agreed and authorized Moses, working through a local agent, to purchase the islands on his behalf, keeping the real buyer's name a secret in order to keep the price down. The owner of Kent Island, the largest of the three, sold it for $25,000, but the owner of the two smaller, Hay and Sheep Islands, refused to sell. He was a fisherman who continued to live on Hay Island. However, he agreed to allow access to his property for "scientific purposes", such as counting nests.

Rockefeller hired two resident wardens for Kent Island, Moses himself and Ralph Griffin of Grand Manan. Each received an annual salary of $1000. They moved to the island in June 1930. Over the succeeding years, the eider population increased dramatically, reaching several hundred nesting pairs by 1935.

In 1934, after visits to Kent Island by scientists including Ernst Mayr and Alfred O. Gross of Bowdoin College, Rockefeller decided to donate the island to Bowdoin College as a research station in exchange for the college's commitment to maintain it as a bird sanctuary. Moses left Kent Island and returned to his home in North Head in 1935.

== Later life ==
His father died in 1936 and Moses sold the fish plant. Also in 1936, he married Mabel Claire Kent, a widow who had, with her late husband, owned the Marathon Hotel in North Head.

Moses continued collecting professionally for natural history museums and adding to the collection of taxidermy birds begun by his grandfather and built up over three generations. It was housed in a separate building near his home and was known as the Moses Museum. In 1951 he donated the collection to the community of Grand Manan as a "gift to all present and future students of natural history". It was moved to the recently opened Grand Manan High School in the village of Grand Harbour, where it was named the Moses Memorial Museum of Natural History.

Allan Moses died in hospital on Grand Manan on 23 March 1953.

== Legacy ==
In 1967 the taxidermy collection of over 300 specimens was moved to the new Grand Manan Museum, where it became the museum's "feature exhibit". Now known as the Allan Moses Bird Collection, it is one of the largest in Canada.

By influencing Rockefeller to purchase Kent Island as a bird sanctuary, Moses made possible the revival of the dwindling eider population. By the same act, he was instrumental in Bowdoin College's eventual acquisition of a field station in the Bay of Fundy. By 2023 research done on Kent Island had resulted in over 220 published scientific papers.
