= Charles B. G. Murphy =

American writer and philanthropist

Charles B.G. Murphy
- Born: Charles B. G. Murphy; January 1, 1906; Suffolk County, Massachusetts, United States
- Died: September 1, 1977 (aged 71)
- Occupation: Writer/philanthropist
- Years active: 1933–1978

Charles B. G. Murphy was a pioneer and philanthropist in psychiatry who was born in 1906 in Suffolk County, Massachusetts.

== Education ==
He attended and graduated from Phillips Academy in Andover, Massachusetts in 1923 and proceeded to Yale University, graduating in 1928. He played football at Yale and was an active member of The Ole Crowes club.

== Publications ==
In 1928 and in 1933, Murphy went to Africa with John Sterling Rockefeller, a fellow student at Yale, to study wildlife. The expedition resulted in two joint publications:

- "Mammals collected by the Rockefeller-Murphy Expedition to Tanganyika Territory and the eastern Belgian Congo". American Museum Novitates; no. 1070, published in 1940 by The American Museum of Natural History.
- J. Sterling Rockefeller, and Charles B. G. Murphy. "The Rediscovery of Pseudocalyptomena." The Auk 50, no. 1 (1933): 23-29. doi:10.2307/4076544. This article describes the findings of their 1933 expedition to Africa in search of the African Green Broadbill.

== World War II ==
In 1942, Murphy worked as the chief of the Graveyard Section of the War Production Board Bureau of Industry Conservation. He helped seize scrap metal in Valparaiso, Indiana to build war tanks.

== Death ==
In his later years Murphy lived in Las Vegas, Nevada. He died Sept 1977, in a hospital in Stanford, California.

== Philanthropy ==
"Charles B. G. Murphy established the Wood Kalb Foundation in 1953. Through three separate philanthropies, Murphy and his estate have given over $10 million to Yale, exclusively in the Department of Psychiatry and the School of Medicine. Following Murphy's passing, control of the foundation fell to his attorney and friend Ethan Allan Hitchcock of the Yale College Class of 1931, who had once been the roommate of Murphy's brother. In 1978, Hitchcock gave $1 million to the medical school to establish the Murphy professorships in psychiatry. In 1979, Hitchcock gave $100,000 in support of Yale Cancer Center".

A second trust Murphy established was entitled "The Foundations' Fund for Research in Psychiatry". The funds were exhausted in 1981, three years after his death. In return, Yale University has named a professorship after him, the "Charles B. G. Murphy Professor".

== Charles B. G. Murphy professors ==
- Benjamin Bunney
- Jane R. Taylor
- Susanne Wofford
- Angus Nairn
- Marina Picciotto
