= Raymond Andrew Paynter Jr. =

American ornithologist and curator

Raymond Andrew Paynter Jr. (29 November 1925 – 10 July 2003) was an American ornithologist and curator at the Museum of Comparative Zoology at Harvard University (1961–1999).

== Biography ==
Paynter was born in New York City where he was educated at Cheshire Academy and Bowdoin College (1946). He studied herring gull behavior on Kent Island while in college. He then began to collect birds from Mexico and joined Yale University for his PhD with a thesis on the Ornithogeography of the Yucatan Peninsula.

He then collected birds for the Yale's Peabody Museum of Natural History and the Harvard Museum of Comparative Zoology (MCZ) with partial sponsorship from S. Dillon Ripley, in Central America and in India, Pakistan and Nepal. His collecting career came to a bloody end in Ecuador in 1965, he and his wife Elizabeth Storer were attacked by a group of locals with machetes. His wife feigned dead with cuts on the scalps on hand while he was left for dead with a skull fracture and a half severed arm. A student escaped and was able to get help. Fortunately, the SS Hope had landed a medical training team for Cuenca the previous year, which was able to assist the Paynters.

Paynter became an assistant curator of birds at the MCZ in 1953 and was curator from 1961 until 1999. He was also a senior lecturer in biology at Harvard. He published books, monographs, gazetteers of South American birds and fifty research papers. He won the Elliott Coues Award for lifetime achievement in ornithology of the American Ornithologists' Union, with Melvin Traylor, for their ornithological gazetteers. He assisted Ernst Mayr to produce the Check-list of Birds of the World.

He died on 10 July 2003 after a stroke.
