= Alfred Otto Gross =

American ornithologist (1883–1970)

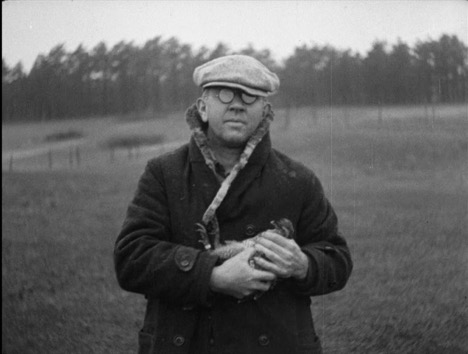
- Gross, holding Booming Ben, endling of the heath hen, 1928
- Born: April 8, 1883; Atwood, Illinois
- Died: May 9, 1970 (aged 87); Greenwich Hospital, Connecticut
- Education: Bachelor, University of Illinois Urbana-Champaign; PhD, Harvard University, 1912
- Known for: Study of heath hen
- Spouse: Edna G. Gross
- Scientific career
- Fields: Ornithology
- Workplaces: Bowdoin College, 1913–1953

Alfred Otto Gross (April 8, 1883 – May 9, 1970) was an American ornithologist and professor of biology at Bowdoin College. He went on two Arctic expeditions to study birds in the region. He studied numerous North American bird species including the ruffed grouse, snowy owl, and goshawk but is best known for his studies of the last populations of the now-extinct heath hen.

== Early life and education ==
Alfred Otto Gross was born on April 8, 1883, in Atwood, Illinois, as the youngest of nine children to Henry, a merchant, and Sophia, both immigrants from Kadelburg, Germany. As a child, Alfred was attracted to the outdoors and collected stuffed birds, mammals, snakes, and other animals. Gross graduated from high school as valedictorian and received a scholarship at the University of Illinois Urbana-Champaign in 1902.

Gross took up a taxidermist position at the university's museum and prepared bird skins for the ornithology classes. In 1905, during his junior year, he became a well-established member of the birdwatching community at the school's arboretum. He was one of the earliest practitioners of using binoculars in the field, and with an assistant he surveyed more than 3,000 miles of land across Illinois, using walking transects of 50 yards width, making the first attempts of any US state to estimate bird populations.

In September 1909, Gross began his Ph.D. at Harvard University. With his friend, James L. Peters, Gross birdwatched the local areas around him, including Mount Auburn, Middlesex Fells, and Fresh Pond. During his summer at the Bermuda Biological Station, Gross met Edna G. Gross, whom he married in 1913. In 1912, Gross completed his degree and went to Bowdoin in the fall and worked there until he retired in 1953.

== Academic career ==
Gross spent 40 years as a professor of biology at Bowdoin College between 1913–1953. He earned international acclaim from his many published correspondences, research notes, and footage of birds, specifically the heath hen. Although Gross had many students go on to become successful biologists, he focused more on research than teaching as a professor.

== Research ==
He wrote 263 articles and books and was awarded the highest honors by the American Ornithologists Union for his work. Much of his work was centered around his fieldwork in two Arctic expeditions led by Donald B. MacMillan in 1934 and 1937, and the study of the remaining heath hens on Martha's Vineyard, Massachusetts in the late 1920s and early 1930s.

He was the first director of Bowdoin College's Scientific Station located on Kent Island, in New Brunswick from 1936 until his retirement, and collected footage of the birds there.

In 1959, he donated his entire ornithological library to the college, which is maintained in special collections. He also created the Alfred O. Gross Fund, which provides funds for students pursuing research in ornithology.

=== Heath hen ===
In 1923, the Massachusetts Department of Fish and Game commissioned Alfred to study and protect the last remaining heath hens on Martha's Vineyard. At that time, only 23 individuals remained, a substantial decline from the reported 800 in 1916. Through the time of his study, Gross published 17 papers, including his 1928 monograph, The Heath Hen, which was well-received within the national birding community.

He produced a silent film on the subject, The Heath Hen, to educate the viewers on the important role of the fragile bird populations he studied. His film was digitized in 2017; it is now believed to be the last footage of the bird before its extinction.

Gross described his work with the heath hen species as "the most interesting and rewarding project" and its significance also took place in the greater scientific community. The Gross films displayed the final moments of the last heath hen, and it was the first species whose extinction was witnessed firsthand through a digital medium.

=== Arctic expeditions ===
In 1934, Bowdoin College sent an expedition to the Arctic commanded by Donald B. MacMillan; Gross was the ornithologist assigned to this expedition upon the ship Bowdoin. At one point, their tent burned up and the group had to wait for rescue to come while sheltering in an Eskimo village. These adventures later led MacMillan to name an island after Gross for his help during this expedition. Gross visited the Arctic again with MacMillan in 1937, then later in his life with his wife on world tours in the 1950s.

== Later life ==
On May 9, 1970, Alfred Otto Gross died at the age of 87 in Greenwich Hospital, Connecticut.
