= John Sterling Rockefeller =

American philanthropist (1904–1988)

- Born: John Sterling Rockefeller; October 28, 1904; Manhattan, New York City, U.S.
- Died: May 10, 1988 (aged 83); Greenwich, Connecticut, U.S.
- Education: Yale University (1928)
- Spouse: Paula Watjen (m. 1931)
- Children: 2
- Parent(s): William Goodsell Rockefeller; Elsie Stillman
- Relatives: William Rockefeller (grandfather); James Stillman (grandfather); James Stillman Rockefeller (brother)

John Sterling Rockefeller (October 28, 1904 – May 10, 1988) was an American philanthropist, conservationist, and amateur ornithologist of the Rockefeller family. He purchased Kent Island in the Bay of Fundy in order to establish a bird sanctuary, and later donated the island to Bowdoin College for use as a research station.

== Early life and education ==
Rockefeller was a member of the wealthy Rockefeller family. He was born October 28, 1904 in Manhattan, New York, the fourth of five children, to William Goodsell Rockefeller and Sarah Elizabeth Rockefeller (née Stillman; 1872–1935). His siblings were; William Avery Rockefeller III (1896–1973), Godfrey Stillman Rockefeller, James Stillman Rockefeller and Almira Geraldine Jackson (née Rockefeller; 1907–1997).

He was a paternal grandson of William Rockefeller Jr. and a grand-nephew of John D. Rockefeller. His maternal grandfather was James Stillman. Rockefeller attended the Taft School and Yale University, where he was a member of the Scroll and Key Society. He graduated from Yale in 1928.

== Contributions to ornithology and conservation ==
=== Collecting in Africa ===
In July 1928 Rockefeller, his Yale classmate Charles B. G. Murphy, and the Canadian collector and taxidermist Allan Moses went to Africa on an ornithological expedition to collect specimens for the American Museum of Natural History. The survey was funded by a grant of approximately $150,000 from the Rockefeller Foundation. The main goal of the expedition was to find and collect the rare Grauer's broadbill, which was known only by one 1908 specimen in the Walter Rothschild Zoological Museum in England, and which had eluded collectors for twenty years.

On July 26, 1929, in a mountainous area at the northern end of Lake Tanganyika, Moses was the first to find and shoot a Grauer's broadbill. The party collected several more broadbill specimens and spent a further three months collecting before returning to the United States.

=== Purchase and donation of Kent Island ===
In order to thank him for his work on the expedition and for collecting the first Grauer's broadbill, Rockefeller undertook to purchase three small islands near Allan Moses's home on Grand Manan Island in the Bay of Fundy and make them a bird sanctuary. The common eider population had been declining for several years and there were estimated to be at most 30 breeding pairs from the Gulf of Maine southward along the Atlantic Coast. Most of these nested on Kent Island, one of the three islands in question.

The owner of Kent Island, the largest of the three, sold it for $25,000, but the owner of the two smaller islands refused to sell them. Rockefeller hired two resident wardens for Kent Island, one of whom was Moses himself. They moved to the island in June 1930 and over the following years the eider population increased dramatically, reaching several hundred nesting pairs by 1935.

In 1936, after visits to Kent Island by scientists including Ernst Mayr and Alfred Otto Gross of Bowdoin College, Rockefeller donated the island to Bowdoin College as a research station in exchange for the nominal fee of one dollar ($1.00) and the college's commitment to maintain it as a bird sanctuary.

=== Expedition sponsorship ===
Rockefeller funded a 1932 ornithological expedition to Timor and Sumba under the direction of Erwin Stresemann. Ernst Mayr later studied the resulting collection.

=== Eponymous recognition ===
Rockefeller is commemorated in the names of two birds. Turdus poliocephalus sterlingi (Sterling's thrush) is a subspecies of island thrush which was described by Ernst Mayr in 1944. Cinnyris rockefelleri (Rockefeller's sunbird) is found in Central Africa. It was described by James Chapin in his 1932 work The Birds of the Belgian Congo, Part I.

== Personal life ==
On May 7, 1931, Rockefeller married Paula Watjen (1905–2000), daughter of Alexander Wilhelm Watjen (1877–1941) and Catharina Caroline "Katie" Watjen (née Fleitmann; 1883–1964). Her father was a European representative director of the Guaranty Trust Company. Her mother was a member of the Fleitmann family. They had two daughters;

- Christina Rockefeller (1932–2015), married to John Julius DuBois (1925–2000), had three sons.
- Paula Rockefeller, married to Norvin Gair Greene, of Bedford, New York.

At the time of his marriage in 1931 Rockefeller was "associated with" the Chatham Phenix National Bank and Trust Company of New York. In 1948 he joined with other Rockefeller and Thomas Fortune Ryan heirs in forming the Enterprise Development Corporation to invest in "securities of privately owned companies making mechanical end-products".

Rockefeller died May 10, 1988 in Greenwich, Connecticut aged 83. His widow died in 2000.
