= Godfrey A. Rockefeller =

American aviator (1924–2010)

Godfrey A. Rockefeller, Sr.
- Born: May 22, 1924; New York City, New York, USA
- Died: January 22, 2010 (aged 85)
- Education: Yale University
- Spouse(s): Constance Wallace (div.); Margo Kuhn (?-2009)
- Children: 4
- Father: Godfrey Stillman Rockefeller
- Relatives: Rockefeller family
- Military career
- Allegiance: United States
- Branch: Marine Corps
- Rank: Major Aviator Pilot
- Conflicts: World War II, Korean War

Godfrey Anderson Rockefeller, Sr. (May 22, 1924 – January 22, 2010) was an American aviator. He was the eldest son of Godfrey Stillman Rockefeller (1899–1983) and Helen Gratz. He is best known for his environmental interests and role in the World Wildlife Fund.

== Early life ==
Godfrey Anderson Rockefeller was born on May 22, 1924, in New York City to Godfrey Stillman Rockefeller (1899–1983) and Helen Gratz. He attended Phillips Academy Andover and later Yale University, at the same time as family friend George H. W. Bush.

== Career ==
He joined the United States Marine Corps and served in both World War II and the Korean War, achieving the rank of Major Aviator Pilot.

Godfrey spent 25 years in the commercial helicopter industry, working for Bell Helicopters as Chief Pilot; Peter Wright, Sr. recalled that he once landed a 32-foot (9.8 m) Bell 47 on a 40-foot (12 m) wide tennis court "because he did not want to ruin the lawn!" He was president and chairman of the Helicopter Association of America, now known as the Helicopter Association International, in 1968, and also belonged to the American Helicopter Society, being a member since 1952 and belonging to its Gold Circle Club.

Rockefeller "played an important role in the founding and creation" of the World Wildlife Fund, which included "hiring the first staff and chief scientist", and later served as its executive director from 1972 to 1978. From 1977 to 2006, he served on the board of directors and the National Council of the WWF.

From 1981 to 1990, he was chairman of the Chesapeake Bay Foundation, and after that chairman emeritus. Rockefeller owned a home on Gibson Island in Maryland and was keenly interested in the preservation of the failing Chesapeake Bay. Following his unexpected death on January 22, 2010, at the St. Andrew's Club in Delray Beach, Florida, where he also owned a home, the Gibson Island community honored him by flying their flag at half-mast.

== Personal life ==
Godfrey's first marriage to Constance Hamilton Wallace ended in divorce. He was then married to Margaret "Margo" Kuhn Rockefeller for fifty three years; she died in 2009, a year before his death. He is survived by four children and several grandchildren.

== See also ==
- Rockefeller family
