= Resolution Island (Nunavut) =

Uninhabited island in Nunavut, Canada

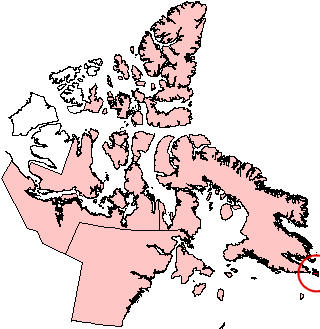
- Resolution Island, Nunavut (red circle at edge of map).

- Location within Nunavut Location within Canada

Geography
- Location: Davis Strait
- Coordinates: 61°30′30″N 65°00′30″W
- Archipelago: Arctic Archipelago
- Area: 1,011.63 km^{2} (390.59 sq mi) (2026)
- Area rank: 50th in Canada & 325th worldwide

Administration
- Canada
- Territory: Nunavut
- Region: Qikiqtaaluk

Demographics
- Population: Uninhabited

Resolution Island is one of the many uninhabited islands in the Arctic Archipelago. Situated in the Qikiqtaaluk Region, Nunavut. It lies offshore of Baffin Island in Hudson Strait. It has an area of 1,011.63 km^{2} (390.59 sq mi). The Lower Savage Islands lie between Resolution Island and Baffin Island, while the Graves Strait separates Resolution Island from the more northern Edgell Island.

== History ==
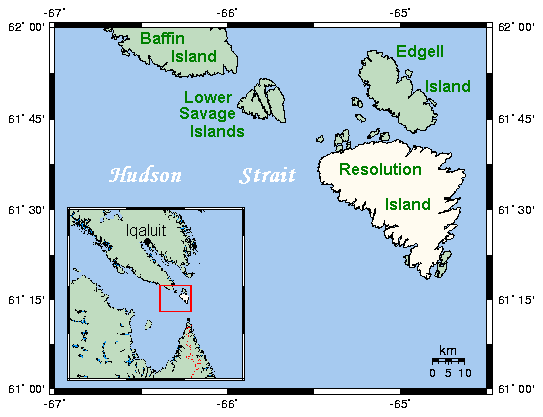
Closeup of Resolution Island and neighbouring area

English explorer Martin Frobisher landed on the island on July 28, 1576, while on a voyage to discover the fabled Northwest Passage. However, it appears to have been named Resolution in 1612 by Sir Thomas Button, after his own ship, the Resolution. The island was home to an American military base, now CFS Resolution Island, that became operational in 1954 as part of the Distant Early Warning Line (DEW). The base was vacated in 1973 and turned over to the Canadian government in 1974 and is now part of the North Warning System. The Canadian cargo ship, the MV Minna, was wrecked on the east side of the island, on August 18, 1974. The vessel was then under charter by the Bedford Institute of Oceanography (BIO) and was conducting scientific surveys at the time of the accident. Badly damaged, the ship's crew and scientific equipment were removed. Bad weather swept the vessel in deeper waters where she sank on October 2, 1974. This vessel with a length of 83.6 m (274 ft) and full displacement of 3,883 t (3,822 long tons; 4,280 short tons) was based in Halifax, Nova Scotia and was on regular charter with the BIO for hydrographic surveys on the Labrador Coast and Hudson Strait. The Minna was built in 1960 at Arendel, Norway and had a crew of at least nine and sixteen staff from BIO. It was during DEW site investigations between 1987 and 1990 that contamination at the site was first discovered. The contamination originates largely from spills from the radar equipment, which used polychlorinated biphenyls (PCBs) as insulators. Other pollutants include unused transformer fluids, hydrocarbons, asbestos and heavy metals in the buildings and sprinkled throughout the site. Resolution Island has been identified as having the highest level of PCB contamination of all former military sites that fall under Crown–Indigenous Relations and Northern Affairs Canada’s (CIRNAC) responsibility in the North. In 1993 and 1994, an environmental site assessment of the area was completed. As a result, temporary barriers were placed across drainage paths to stop the migration of PCBs into the water. Further investigations were done and, in 1997, INAC initiated remediation work with the Qikiqtaaluk Corporation. A large-scale remediation plan was developed, in cooperation with Environment and Climate Change Canada, Qikiqtaaluk Corporation and Queen's University. Steps were taken at that time to ensure that the contaminants were not posing a risk to humans and wildlife.

== Climate ==
Resolution Island is located halfway between Killiniq Island and Baffin Island, and in the central area of Davis Strait. The climate of the island belongs to the typical tundra climate (Köppen: ETf). Because of the influence of ocean currents, the climate in winter is not extremely cold, but the temperature in summer is much lower than that in surrounding areas. Even the average temperature in the warmest August is only 3.2 °C (37.8 °F). The year's extreme temperature ranged from −38.3 °C (−36.9 °F) on February 9, 1967, to 22.7 °C (72.9 °F) on August 23, 2014.

Climate data for Resolution Island (1951−1980 normals, extremes 1959−2022)
Month	Jan	Feb	Mar	Apr	May	Jun	Jul	Aug	Sep	Oct	Nov	Dec	Year
Record high °C (°F)	1.7 (35.1)	2.2 (36.0)	2.8 (37.0)	6.6 (43.9)	14.3 (57.7)	17.2 (63.0)	22.5 (72.5)	22.7 (72.9)	19.4 (66.9)	11.5 (52.7)	3.9 (39.0)	10.1 (50.2)	22.7 (72.9)
Mean daily maximum °C (°F)	−13.9 (7.0)	−15.4 (4.3)	−12.8 (9.0)	−7.7 (18.1)	−0.9 (30.4)	2.2 (36.0)	5.0 (41.0)	5.3 (41.5)	3.2 (37.8)	−0.1 (31.8)	−3.6 (25.5)	−10.9 (12.4)	−4.1 (24.6)
Daily mean °C (°F)	−17.1 (1.2)	−18.2 (−0.8)	−15.5 (4.1)	−10.2 (13.6)	−2.8 (27.0)	0.4 (32.7)	2.8 (37.0)	3.2 (37.8)	1.6 (34.9)	−1.8 (28.8)	−5.7 (21.7)	−13.2 (8.2)	−6.4 (20.5)
Mean daily minimum °C (°F)	−20.2 (−4.4)	−21.1 (−6.0)	−18.2 (−0.8)	−12.7 (9.1)	−4.7 (23.5)	−1.5 (29.3)	0.5 (32.9)	1.1 (34.0)	−0.1 (31.8)	−3.4 (25.9)	−7.9 (17.8)	−15.5 (4.1)	−8.6 (16.5)
Record low °C (°F)	−37.8 (−36.0)	−38.3 (−36.9)	−34.4 (−29.9)	−30.0 (−22.0)	−18.9 (−2.0)	−10.0 (14.0)	−7.2 (19.0)	−3.9 (25.0)	−10.0 (14.0)	−18.3 (−0.9)	−26.7 (−16.1)	−31.1 (−24.0)	−38.3 (−36.9)
Average precipitation mm (inches)	19.1 (0.75)	13.3 (0.52)	12.5 (0.49)	10.2 (0.40)	21.1 (0.83)	24.7 (0.97)	42.3 (1.67)	39.7 (1.56)	49.2 (1.94)	36.6 (1.44)	24.8 (0.98)	19.8 (0.78)	313.3 (12.33)
Average rainfall mm (inches)	0.3 (0.01)	0.6 (0.02)	0.1 (0.00)	0.3 (0.01)	4.4 (0.17)	18.7 (0.74)	42.0 (1.65)	39.6 (1.56)	45.7 (1.80)	15.5 (0.61)	1.0 (0.04)	0.1 (0.00)	168.3 (6.63)
Average snowfall cm (inches)	20.1 (7.9)	13.8 (5.4)	14.5 (5.7)	9.4 (3.7)	14.9 (5.9)	6.1 (2.4)	0.4 (0.2)	0.1 (0.0)	4.9 (1.9)	23.1 (9.1)	26.1 (10.3)	22.0 (8.7)	155.4 (61.2)
Average precipitation days (≥ 0.2 mm)	12	8	10	10	11	10	10	10	14	14	16	17	142
Average rainy days (≥ 0.2 mm)	0	0	0	1	3	8	10	10	12	7	1	0	52
Average snowy days (≥ 0.2 cm)	12	8	10	9	7	3	0	0	3	10	15	17	94
Average relative humidity (%)	83	84	86	88	92	93	92	95	94	94	90	85	90
Average dew point °C (°F)	−19.6 (−3.3)	−19.1 (−2.4)	−16.5 (2.3)	−10.1 (13.8)	−3.4 (25.9)	−0.3 (31.5)	2.0 (35.6)	2.4 (36.3)	0.7 (33.3)	−2.5 (27.5)	−7.5 (18.5)	−14.9 (5.2)	−7.4 (18.7)
Source: Environment and Climate Change Canada
