= Godfrey Stillman Rockefeller =

American financier

- Born: May 1, 1899
- Died: February 23, 1983 (aged 83); Greenwich, Connecticut, USA
- Education: Yale University
- Spouse: Helen Gratz
- Children: 5, including Godfrey
- Father: William Rockefeller
- Relatives: Rockefeller family William Rockefeller Jr. (grandfather); James Jewett Stillman (grandfather)
- Military career
- Allegiance: United States
- Rank: Lieutenant Colonel
- Conflicts: World War I, World War II

Godfrey Stillman Rockefeller (May 1, 1899 – February 23, 1983) was an American financier and chairman of Cranston Print Works, a Rockefeller-owned textile company.

== Early life ==
Godfrey Stillman Rockefeller was born on May 1, 1899, and was the second son of William Goodsell Rockefeller (1870–1922) and Sarah Elizabeth "Elsie" Stillman (1872–1935). His paternal grandfather was William Rockefeller Jr. (1841–1922), brother of John D. Rockefeller, the co-founders of Standard Oil. His maternal grandfather was James Jewett Stillman (1850–1918), a businessman who was chairman of the board of directors of the National City Bank. He was a member of the Scroll and Key society and graduated from Yale University in 1921.

== Career ==
Rockefeller served as a second lieutenant in World War I and served as a lieutenant colonel during World War II. He was partner in Clark, Dodge & Company; stockholder in the Enterprise Development Corporation; chairman of the Cranston Print Works; director of Benson & Hedges; trustee of the Fairfield Foundation; and had been a director of Freeport-McMoRan since December 1931.

== Personal life ==
He was married to Helen Gratz, sister-in-law of Edward H. Watson. They were the parents of five children:

- Godfrey Anderson Rockefeller (1924–2010).
- Peter Rockefeller
- Lucy Rockefeller Stewart
- Marion Rockefeller Stone
- Audrey Rockefeller Blair

Rockefeller died on February 23, 1983, of leukemia in Greenwich, Connecticut.

== See also ==
- Rockefeller family
