= Edgell Island =

Island in Nunavut, Canada

- Location within Nunavut Location within Canada

Geography
- Location: Davis Strait
- Coordinates: 61°50′N 65°00′W
- Archipelago: Arctic Archipelago
- Area: 287 km^{2} (111 sq mi)
- Highest point: 254 m (833 ft)

Administration
- Canada
- Territory: Nunavut
- Region: Qikiqtaaluk

Demographics
- Population: Uninhabited

Edgell Island is one of Baffin Island's small offshore islands, located in the Arctic Archipelago in the territory of Nunavut. It lies in Davis Strait, near the entrance into Frobisher Bay. Graves Strait, about 16 mi (26 km) long and 7 mi (11 km) wide, separates it from Resolution Island. Edgell Island has an area of 287 km^{2} (111 sq mi) and a perimeter of 148 km (92 mi). Black Bluff is a headland at the north end and is the only named feature on the island.

The island is named after Capt. Edgell who is also notable for his 1801 survey of Pacquet, Newfoundland and Labrador.
