= Guru Ramakrishnan =

Guru Ramakrishnan is an Indian-American investor and entrepreneur who works in the hedge fund and private equity sectors. He is the founder and CEO of Meru Capital Group and was a co-founder of Old Lane Partners, LP. Ramakrishnan has held roles in financial institutions and has participated in philanthropic and academic initiatives.

== Early life and education ==
Guru Ramakrishnan was born and brought up in Chennai, India, where he attended Don Bosco School.

In 1982, he moved to the United States and enrolled at the University of Michigan. There, he completed both Bachelor's and Master's degrees in Economics with high distinction. He later pursued an MBA at the University of Chicago Booth School of Business, specializing in Finance.

== Career ==
=== Morgan Stanley ===
Ramakrishnan began his career at Morgan Stanley in 1988, where he worked in the equity and debt capital markets. He eventually became the head of the firm's equity derivatives group in London and later led the global trading business in New York. He also worked at Morgan Stanley's Investment Banking Division.

=== Old Lane Partners, LP ===
In 2005, Ramakrishnan co-founded Old Lane Partners, LP, with Vikram Pandit and John Havens. Old Lane attracted over $4 billion in capital, making it one of the most successful hedge fund launches of the time. In 2007, Citigroup acquired Old Lane for approximately $800 million, after which Ramakrishnan continued to run Old Lane as the CEO until it was eventually shut down by the parent company Citigroup during the 2008 financial crisis.

=== Meru Capital Group ===
In 2009, Ramakrishnan founded Meru Capital Group, a hedge fund focused on macroeconomic trends and long-term value creation.

== Board memberships and philanthropy ==
Ramakrishnan serves on the Board of Trustees at the University of Chicago and is a member of the Global Business Leaders Council at Harvard Business School. In 2021 he endowed a chair in Sanskrit studies at the College of the University of Chicago, and provided scholarships to support students.

== Personal life ==
Guru Ramakrishnan lives in New York City with his wife, Anupama, and their two sons Mahesh and Govind. He is also a poet, writing under the pseudonym Rama Krsna. His poetry explores cultural and philosophical themes.
