= Richard Bowen =

Richard Bowen may refer to:

- Richard Bowen (Royal Navy officer) (1761–1797), British officer
- Richard L. Bowen (born 1933), American university president
- Richard M. Bowen III, American banker
- Richard Bowen (bowls) (born 1957), Welsh lawn bowler
