= Richard M. Bowen III =

American banker

Richard M. Bowen III is an American banker who blew the whistle on mortgage fraud at Citigroup that helped trigger the sub-prime mortgage crisis.

A senior vice president at Citigroup, Bowen served as the chief underwriter of the financial services conglomerate's Consumer Lending Group. Bowen's responsibility was essentially to serve as the quality control supervisor ensuring the unit's creditworthiness. Beginning in June 2006, Bowen began warning the board of directors about the extreme risks being taken on by the mortgage operation that could potentially result in massive losses.

His group bought and sold $90 billion of residential mortgages annually. When Bowen first blew the whistle in 2006, 60% of the mortgages were defective. The amount of bad mortgages began increasing throughout 2007 and eventually exceeded 80% of the volume. Many of the mortgages were not only defective, but were fraudulent.

Bowen attempted to rouse the board via weekly reports and other communications. On 3 November 2007, Bowen emailed Citigroup Chairman Robert Rubin and the bank's chief financial officer, head auditor and the risk management officer to again expose the risk and potential losses, claiming that the group's internal controls had broken down. He requested an outside investigation of his business unit. The investigation revealed that Bowen was right, and that the Consumer Lending Group had suffered a breakdowns of internal controls since 2005.

Bowen's warnings were ignored, despite the fact that withholding such information from shareholders violated the Sarbanes-Oxley Act, which he pointed out. Despite his warnings, Citigroup CEO Charles Prince signed a certification that the bank was in compliance with the Sarbanes-Oxley Act.

Citigroup stripped Bowen of most of his responsibilities and informed him that his physical presence was no longer required at the bank. The Financial Crisis Inquiry Commission asked him to testify about Citigroup's role in the mortgage crisis, and he did so, appearing as one of the first witnesses before the Commission in April 2010.

After leaving Citigroup, Bowen taught about ethics and accounting as a public speaker and professor at the University of Texas at Dallas.
