= John Havens =

American businessman

John E. Havens (born October 12, 1956) is the former chairman of Citigroup spinoff, Napier Park Global Capital, and is also the former president and chief operating officer of Citigroup.

== Career ==
Havens graduated from Harvard University in 1979 and his first job was a trader of convertible securities at Kidder Peabody.

Havens joined Morgan Stanley in 1986 as a principal in institutional equity, where he progressed, eventually leading to a five year stint as a Managing Director and Global Head of the Institutional Equity Division from September 2000 to March 30, 2005.

During his time at Morgan Stanley he struck up a personal and business relationship with Vikram Pandit where the two rose through the ranks together. He and Pandit left after being passed over by Philip J. Purcell in 2005, and the two formed Old Lane LP which was in turn was bought by Citigroup in 2007 for $800 million.

At Citi he was the highest paid official in 2009 and 2010 when he was paid more than $9 million per year at a time when Pandit was making only $1 per year as Citi was dealing with bringing the company out of near collapse and was subsidized by $20 billion in Troubled Asset Relief Program (TARP) funds. In January 2011, he became president and COO a month after Citi paid back its TARP loans. The position had been vacant since 2007.

Prior to his promotion he was CEO of the Institutional Clients Group at Citi. He left Citi, along with CEO Vikram Pandit, on October 16, 2012.

In January 2014, Havens was appointed as the non-executive chairman of Napier Park Global Capital, a spin-off firm of Citigroup.

Business positions
Preceded by Robert Druskin; Note: Position vacant 2007–2011	Citigroup COO; 2011-present	Succeeded by Incumbent
