= 399 Park Avenue =

Office skyscraper in Manhattan, New York

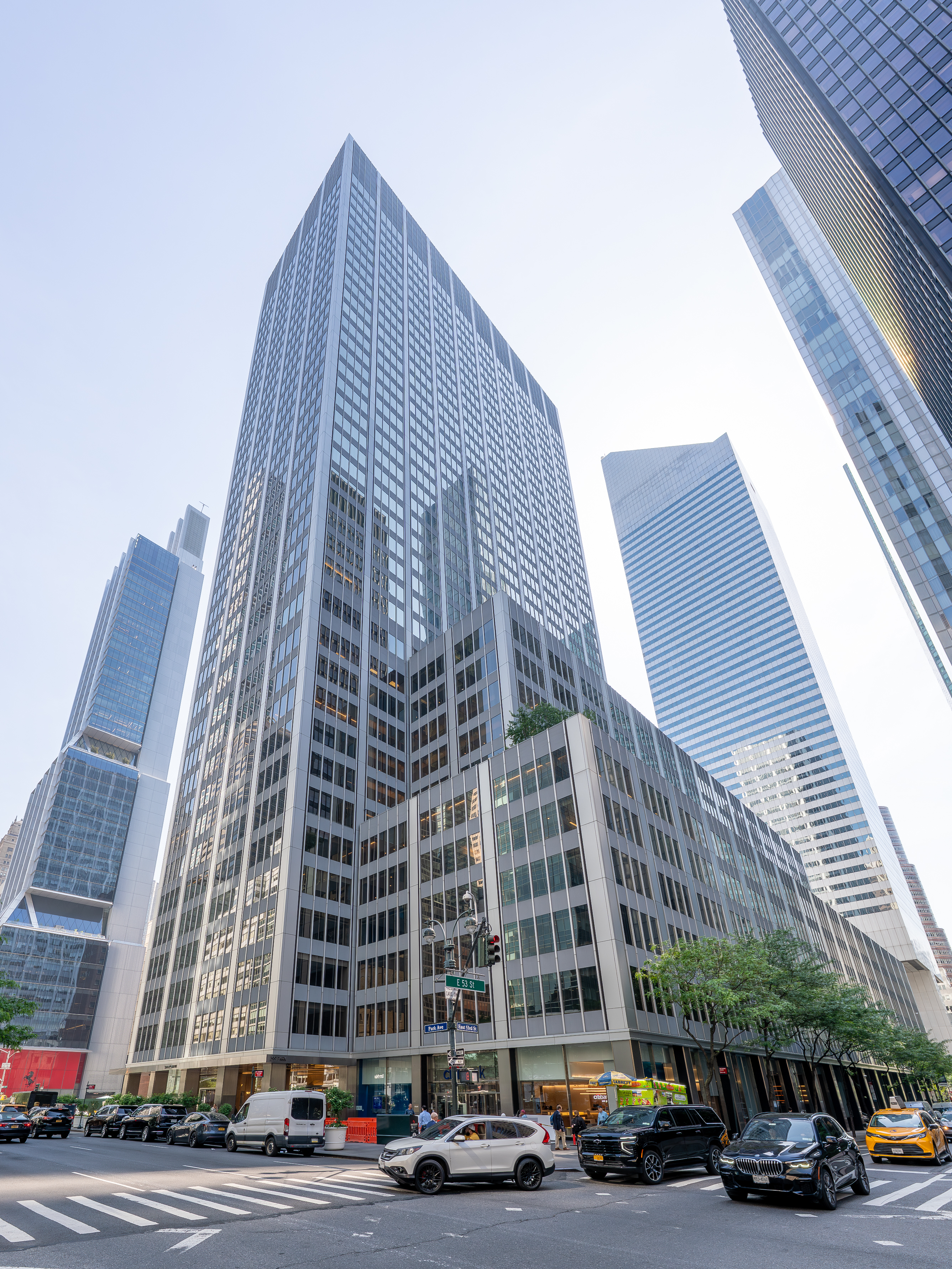
- 399 Park Avenue from the ground; 601 Lexington Avenue is at right.
- Interactive map of the 399 Park Avenue area

General information
- Status: Completed
- Type: Office
- Coordinates: 40°45′33″N 73°58′18″W
- Completed: 1961
- Owner: Boston Properties

Height
- Roof: 524 ft (159.7 m)
- Top floor: 470 ft (143 m)

Technical details
- Floor count: 41
- Floor area: 1,700,000 square feet (160,000 m^{2})

Design and construction
- Architects: Carson & Lundin; Kahn & Jacobs
- Developer: First National Bank

399 Park Avenue is a 41-story office building that occupies the entire block between Park Avenue and Lexington Avenue and 53rd Street and 54th Street in Midtown Manhattan, New York City. The building was the world headquarters of Citigroup from 1961, when it moved from 55 Wall Street, until 2015, when the company moved to 388 Greenwich Street.

== History ==
The building lot was assembled by Vincent Astor who initially planned to build a 46-story Astor Plaza on the site. Astor had problems completing the assembly of the lots of mostly residential buildings as a pharmacy held out. In 1974, the company opened the Citigroup Center annex across Lexington to the east. In 1987, Citigroup sold one third of its interest in the building along with two-thirds of its interest in Citigroup Center to Dai-Ichi Mutual Life Insurance Company for $670 million. At the time, Citigroup said it was moving many of its offices to One Court Square in Long Island City, Queens. Citigroup moved out of the top two thirds of the building but kept the lower floors. Citigroup later bought back its interest in the building.

In 2002, Boston Properties bought the building for $1.06 billion beating out other bidders including Brookfield Properties, Equity Office Properties, Vornado Realty Trust, RFR Holdings, and the Paramount Group. Boston Properties paid over $630 per square foot, which was the highest price ever paid for an office building at the time. Boston also bought the nearby Citigroup Center. Citigroup then leased its headquarters from Boston Properties through 2017. After the September 11 attacks damaged much of their headquarters at Brookfield Place, Lehman Brothers leased 400,000 square feet (37,000 m^{2}) in the building until their 2008 bankruptcy. Other former tenants included law firms Caplin & Drysdale, which moved to 600 Lexington Avenue and Wilmer Cutler Pickering Hale and Dorr, which moved to 7 World Trade Center.

In December 2013, Citigroup announced it would relocate its global headquarters to 388 and 390 Greenwich Street in Tribeca, a complex it had purchased from SL Green Realty in 2016.

== Tenants ==
- Avenue Capital Group
- Brigade Capital Management, 37,430 square feet (3,477 m^{2}) on 15th and 16th floors
- BentallGreenOak
- Blue Owl
- Citigroup
- Colony NorthStar
- Cyrus Capital Partners
- C. V. Starr & Co., 211,000 square feet (19,600 m^{2})
- Jordan Company, 25,000 square feet (2,300 m^{2})
- Lexington Partners, 48,000 square feet (4,500 m^{2}) on 20th and 21st floors
- Millennium Management, LLC, 300,000 square feet (28,000 m^{2})
- Moelis & Company
- Peterson Management, 40,000 square feet (3,700 m^{2})
- PineBridge Investments
- Robins Kaplan LLP, 38,000 square feet (3,500 m^{2})
- Savills, 91,000 square feet (8,500 m^{2}) on 11th and 5th floor
