= Jane Fraser (businesswoman) =

British-American banking executive (born 1967)

Dame Jane Fraser DBE
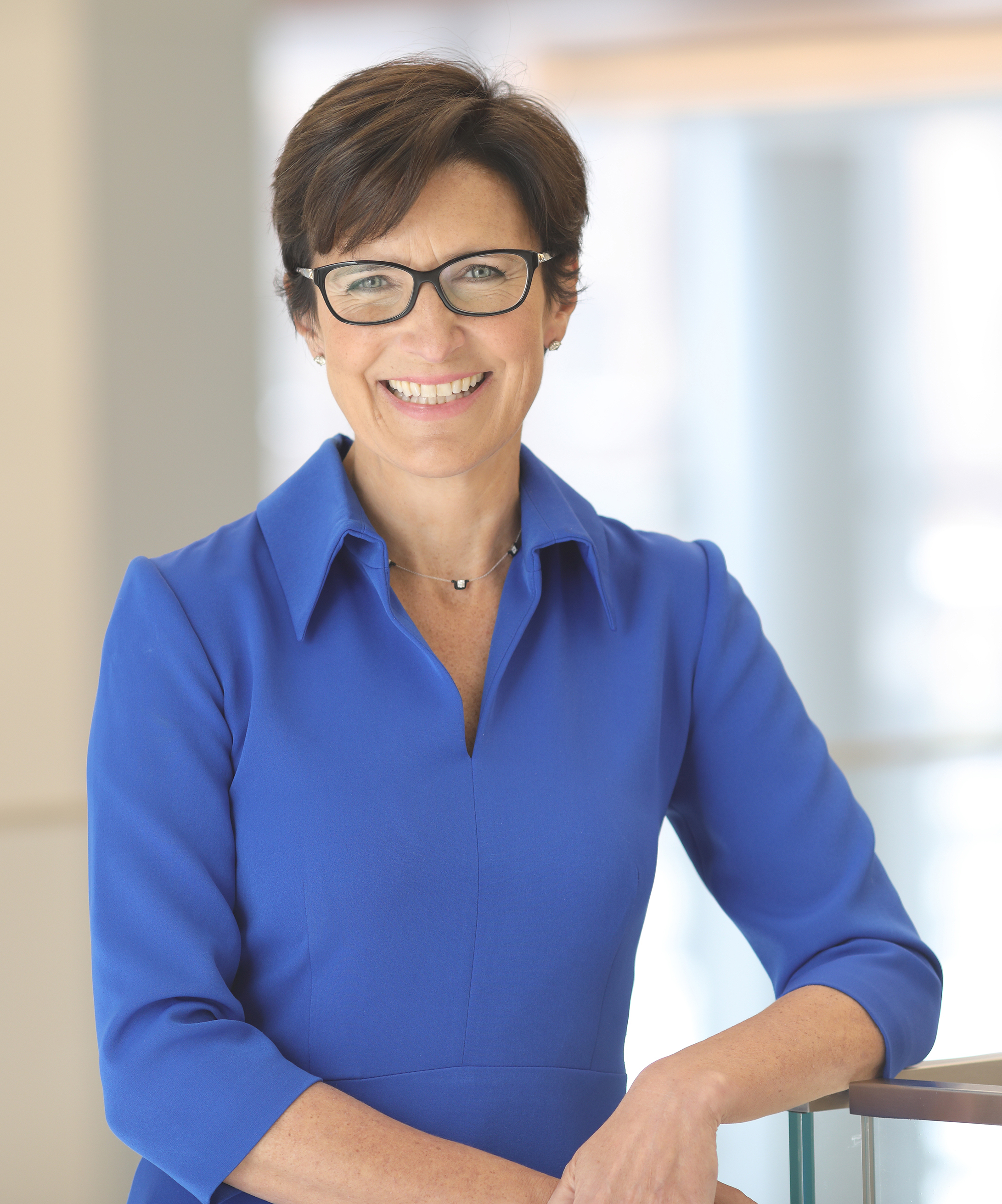
- Fraser in 2021
- Born: 13 July 1967 (age 59); St Andrews, Scotland, UK
- Education: Girton College, Cambridge (MA); Harvard University (MBA)
- Occupations: Chairwoman and CEO of Citigroup
- Predecessor: Michael Corbat
- Children: 2

Dame Jane Fraser DBE (born 13 July 1967) is a British-American banking executive who has been chief executive officer (CEO) of Citi since March 2021 and chair since October 2025. She is the first woman to head a major U.S. bank.

Fraser was educated at Girton College, Cambridge, and Harvard Business School. She worked at McKinsey & Company for 10 years, rising to partner prior to joining Citigroup in 2004. In 2019, she was named president of Citigroup and CEO of its consumer banking division.

Fraser was included on Fortune's "Most Powerful Women in Business" list in 2014 and 2015 and has been called the "Number 1 Woman to Watch" for two consecutive years by American Banker. She was named the eighth most powerful woman in the world in 2025 by Forbes. She is a member of the President's Export Council.

== Early life and education ==
Jane Fraser was born on 13 July 1967 in St Andrews, Scotland. She attended Girton College, Cambridge, from 1985 to 1988, graduating with a BA (promoted to an MA per tradition) in economics.

After graduation, she worked as a mergers and acquisitions analyst at Goldman Sachs, London, from July 1988 to July 1990, then as a brokerage associate for Asesores Bursátiles, a Madrid-based securities broker, from August 1990 to June 1992. In 1992, she enrolled at Harvard Business School, earning her MBA in 1994.

== McKinsey & Company ==
In 1994, Fraser joined McKinsey & Company, working in financial services and global strategy, eventually rising to partner. For the first six years, she worked in New York, and for the last four years in London. Fraser worked part-time while raising her young children.

Fraser wrote articles on globalization and was a co-author, with three other McKinsey employees, of the 1999 book Race for the World: Strategies to Build a Great Global Firm. The book hailed Citi as a model for "leveraging superior business-system productivity costs in different geographies." As part of Fraser's research for the book, she traveled to China, Hong Kong, Indonesia, Singapore and India to interview McKinsey clients about their global challenges. After hearing Fraser speak about the book, Citigroup executive Michael Klein spent several years encouraging her to make the move to Citigroup, which she eventually did in 2004.

== Citigroup ==
Fraser was hired as Head of Client Strategy in Citigroup's investment and global banking division in July 2004. In October 2007, she was promoted to Global Head of Strategy and Mergers and Acquisitions, a position she held until May 2009. Her tenure as Global Head coincided with the 2008 financial crisis, and she was part of the executive team that was "charged with restructuring the group, leading its re-engineering effort, making divestments and raising new capital."

A Citi Private Bank office

In June 2009, she was named CEO of Citi Private Bank. At the time of her promotion, the bank was running an annual deficit of approximately $250 million; it returned to the black during her four-year tenure. Among the changes she implemented were a decrease in the ratio of private bankers to clients, with a target of one banker for every 30 clients, and the removal of commissions and sales formulas for bankers in favor of a year-end discretionary bonus.

In May 2013, she was asked to replace the retiring CEO of CitiMortgage. Though she knew the move was a career risk, she accepted the challenge. Her stewardship of Citigroup's mortgage division coincided with the marketwide drop in demand for mortgage refinancing, forcing the bank to refocus its efforts on selling residential mortgages to home buyers. Citigroup closed several mortgage offices nationwide and laid off 1,000 employees in September 2013 alone.

Less than a year later, in March 2014, Fraser was promoted to CEO of US Consumer and Commercial Banking, succeeding Cecelia Stewart, who announced her retirement. And in April 2015, she was named CEO of Citigroup Latin America, with responsibility for operations in 24 countries. The latter promotion followed a reshuffling of Citigroup executives, sparked by the retirement of Manuel Medina-Mora, CEO of Citigroup's global consumer bank. Medina-Mora was replaced by Stephen Bird, former CEO for the Asia-Pacific region, who in turn was replaced by Francisco Aristeguieta, former CEO of Citigroup Latin America. While based in Miami, Fraser has been tasked with, among other things, "instilling a more U.S.-like culture" at Banamex (Banco Nacional de México), owned and operated by Citigroup since 2001. The bank was fined $2.2 million on fraud charges in 2014. The head of Banamex, Ernesto Torres Cantu, reports directly to Fraser.

In October 2019, Fraser was appointed President of Citigroup and Head of Global Consumer Banking (GCB), and was responsible for all of Citi’s Consumer businesses, including Retail Banking and Wealth Management, Credit Cards, Mortgage and Operations and Technology in 19 markets.

In 2026, Citigroup was preparing to ask regulators to lift longstanding restrictions on the bank, but the newly identified risk-modeling issue added another challenge to those efforts.

=== Promotion to CEO and tenure ===
In September 2020, Citigroup announced its CEO Michael Corbat's retirement, to be effective in February 2021. Fraser was appointed to succeed Corbat, becoming the first female CEO of a top-tier Wall Street Investment Bank, leading the third-largest bank in the U.S.

During the COVID-19 pandemic, Fraser instituted permanent plans to allow staff to work from home some days of the week and granting staff greater flexibility in their schedules than other Wall Street firms. She has cited differentiating Citigroup from other bulge bracket banks such as Goldman Sachs and JPMorgan Chase during recruiting as a motivation for this approach.

Fraser was scheduled to speak at the November 2022 Global Financial Leaders' Investment Summit, with the Hong Kong Democracy Council claiming that her presence, along with other financial executives, would legitimize the Hong Kong government's whitewashing of the erosion of freedoms in the city. However, Fraser tested positive for COVID-19 and did not show up for the summit.

In August 2025, she traveled to Mexico City to meet with President Claudia Sheinbaum.The discussions reportedly focus on a potential public listing of Banamex, Citi’s retail banking arm, as the bank explores new strategic options after a previously abandoned $7 billion sale.

In October 2025, Citigroup elected Fraser as Chair of the board of directors and she was awarded a $25 million bonus.

In February 2026, Citigroup approved US$42 million for CEO Jane Fraser’s total compensation for 2025, up nearly 22 per cent from a year earlier. As of July 2026, Fraser has contributed to a 45% profit increase at Citigroup.

== Philanthropy and memberships ==
Fraser is Vice Chair for Partnership for New York City and a member of the Harvard Business School's Board of Dean's Advisors, the Stanford Global Advisory Board, the Economic Club of New York and the Council on Foreign Relations. In February 2021, before becoming CEO, Fraser formed a global operating team of senior executives and business leaders to increase accountability across the bank. She was also a member of the board of the Touch Foundation from 2006 to 2015.

In June 2015, Fraser appeared on a CBS Local report about Citi Global Community Day, in which she and other volunteers spruced up the Liberty Square public housing project in Miami.

== Honours and recognition ==
In 2015, Fraser was ranked number 41 on Fortune's list of the 51 Most Powerful Women in Business, up from number 48 on the 2014 list. American Banker named her the "Number 1 Woman to Watch" both in 2014 and 2015.

Fraser was selected for the inaugural 2021 Forbes 50 Over 50; made up of entrepreneurs, leaders, scientists and creators who are over the age of 50.

Fraser was ranked 4th on Fortune's list of Most Powerful Women in 2023, 3rd in 2025, and 1st in 2026.

== Personal life ==
Fraser is married and the mother of two sons. Her husband, Alberto Piedra, a former banker and native of Cuba, left his job as a bank manager in Europe during the 2008 financial crisis to spend more time caring for their young children.

In April 2021, during her first televised interview as CEO of Citigroup on CNBC, Fraser disclosed that despite the [British] accent, she had "been a proud American [citizen] for the last 20 years".

On 26 May 2021, during a congressional testimony before the United States Senate Committee on Banking, Housing and Urban Affairs, Fraser noted in her opening remarks as CEO of Citigroup, that she first arrived in the United States in 1987, before becoming a U.S. citizen in 2001.

== Sources ==
- Bryan, Lowell L.; Fraser, Jane; Oppenheim, Jeremy; Rall, Wilhelm (1999). Race for the World: Strategies to Build a Great Global Firm. Harvard Business School Press. p. 363. ISBN 087584846X.

Business positions
Preceded by Michael Corbat	Citigroup CEO; 2021–present	Succeeded by Incumbent
Preceded by John Cunningham Dugan	Citigroup Chair; 2025–present	Succeeded by Incumbent
