= Michael Corbat =

American banker (born 1960)

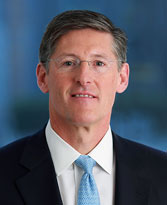
- Born: May 2, 1960 (age 66); Bristol, Connecticut, U.S.
- Education: Harvard University (BA)
- Years active: 1983–present

Michael Louis "Mike" Corbat (born May 2, 1960) is an American banker who served as the chief executive officer of Citigroup from 2012 to 2021. His 2012 welcome from The New York Times described him as a "Jack-of-All-Trades".

== Early life and education ==
Born in Bristol, Connecticut, Corbat graduated from Harvard University in 1983 with a Bachelor of Arts degree in economics, where he also played offensive guard for the school's football team. He was two-time all Ivy League and was selected as first team College Football All-America Team in NCAA Division I-AA in 1982. He was the first Harvard player to be selected since Dan Jiggetts in 1975.

== Career ==
Corbat worked at Citi or its predecessor companies for his entire career, starting with Salomon Brothers.

He served as Head of Citi's Global Corporate Bank and Global Commercial Bank and CEO of Citi's Global Wealth Management (consisting of Smith Barney and the Citi Private Bank). As CEO of Citi Holdings, he was responsible for and led the divestiture of a portfolio of non-core business and assets after the 2008 financial crisis and Citi's participation in the Troubled Asset Relief Program (TARP).

In 2011, he was named CEO of Europe, Middle East and Africa (EMEA) where he oversaw all Citi operations in the region. In October 2012, Mike Corbat was appointed CEO of Citi after Vikram Pandit's resignation.

In September 2020, Citigroup announced Corbat's retirement, to be effective in February 2021. Jane Fraser was appointed to assume as CEO after Corbat, becoming the First Female CEO of a Top-Tier Investment Bank.

=== Issues addressed ===
In 2018 The New York Times wrote that "where Mr. Corbat can steer Citigroup directly, he is doing so." The issues he addressed included:

- Gender pay gap which he both defended, proclaiming that it inspires entry-level employee to work harder and advance, and concurrently described as "a challenge we need to tackle together."
- Bricks and Clicks, which Fortune Magazine described as "a broad physical branch network that caters to Baby Boomers and a robust online (and mobile) presence for Generation X and Millennials."

=== Leaving Citi ===
Corbat's annual salary was cut 21% as he was on his way out. His pay cut and departure happened after the Federal Reserve and Office of the Comptroller of the Currency (OCC) fined Citigroup $400 million for its mismanagement.

== Personal life ==
Corbat is an enthusiastic fly fisherman, golfer and downhill skier who self-describes as "an avid outdoorsman and responsible gun owner." While having served on the Citigroup Board of Directors, the EMI Board of Directors, BritishAmerican Business Board of Directors and the U.S. Ski and Snowboard Team Foundation Board of Trustees. Today, He is a Co-Owner of the Jackson Hole Mountain Resort, a Senior Advisor to 26N, A board member of Chubb and The PGA TOUR. Mr. Corbat founded and runs an Advisory Business, Teton Advisors, LLC. He is married to Donna, and has two married children and several grandchildren.

Business positions
Preceded by Vikram Pandit	Citigroup CEO; 2012–2021	Succeeded by Jane Fraser
