= Winfried Bischoff =

German-born British banker (1941–2023)

Sir Winfried Franz Wilhelm Bischoff (10 May 1941 – 25 April 2023) was a German-born British banker who was the chairman of Lloyds Banking Group. He previously served as chairman and interim CEO of Citigroup in 2007. He was succeeded as CEO by Vikram Pandit on 11 December 2007. Bischoff stepped down as chairman on 23 February 2009 and was replaced by Richard Parsons. He had dual British and German citizenship.

Bischoff was knighted in the 2000 New Year Honours for services to Banking.

== Early life and education ==
Winfried Bischoff was born in Aachen, Germany, son of import-export entrepreneur Paul Bischoff and Hildegard, née Kühn, who had been working as a nanny in London when she met her future husband. Bischoff had an early education in Cologne and Düsseldorf. In 1955, he moved to Johannesburg where he received a Bachelor of Commerce degree at the University of the Witwatersrand in 1961.

== Career ==
Bischoff worked in the International Department of Chase Manhattan Bank from 1962 to 1963. He joined J. Henry Schroder & Co. Limited in London in 1966 in its Company Finance Division. In 1971, he became managing director of Schroders Asia Limited in Hong Kong. He became group chief executive of Schroders plc in December 1984, when Schroders was worth £30 million. He became chairman in May 1995. In 2000, the investment banking division of the company was acquired for £1.3 billion by Citi through its Smith Barney subsidiary.

Bischoff joined Citi as chairman of Citigroup Europe and was a member of The Operating Committee of Citigroup Inc., a position he held until appointed chairman in November 2007. He was a non-executive director at S&P Global, Eli Lilly and Company, Land Securities, Akbank, and Prudential.

On 27 July 2009, he was appointed chairman designate of Lloyds Banking Group and took up the position of chairman on 15 September 2009. He held this position until his retirement on 3 April 2014.

Between May 2014 and October 2019 he was chairman of the UK Financial Reporting Council.

Bischoff was a member of the 30% Club, a group of FTSE-100 chairmen committed to having at least 30% of their board members being female.

== Personal life and death ==
Bischoff died on 25 April 2023, at age 81.

Business positions
Preceded by Sir Victor Blank	Chairman of Lloyds Banking Group; 2009–2014	Succeeded by The Lord Blackwell
Preceded by Charles Prince	CEO of Citigroup; November – December 2007	Succeeded by Vikram Pandit
Preceded by Robert Rubin	Chairman of Citigroup; 2007–2009	Succeeded by Richard Parsons
