= CitiFX Pro =

Online foreign exchange market trading platform

- Type: Trading name and service of Citibank N.A.
- Industry: Financial services
- Founded: 2008
- Defunct: July 27, 2015
- Headquarters: New York City, NY, United States
- Services: Currency trading
- Parent: Citibank
- Website: www.citifxpro.com

CitiFX Pro was Citigroup's online foreign exchange market trading platform for retail and small institutional traders including commodity trading advisors, broker-dealers, money managers, and hedge funds. CitiFX Pro provided the service from 2009 until it discontinued offering services to clients in June 2015 and sold all U.S. accounts to FXCM, and international accounts to Saxo Bank.

== Overview ==
CitiFX was fully operational by 2009 for US, European and Asian markets, with headquarters in New York and offices in London, Singapore and Hong Kong. Some trading services were provided to Citibank as a white-label product by Saxo Bank.

CitiFX Pro offered trading in 130 currency pairs with settlement in the customer's base currency. The company also offered streaming prices with one-click trading and order management tools.

== History ==
The parent company City Bank of New York was established in 1812 and by 1895 the institution was one of the largest banks in the world. In 1897, Citi became the first U.S. bank to establish a foreign department and began foreign exchange trading that year.

CitiFX Pro the retail foreign exchange trading service was launched in the United States in March 2008 and in Hong Kong and Singapore in September 2008. In February 2009, the company added Federal Deposit Insurance Corporation insurance on US dollar deposits placed as margin for trading.

Later in 2009, CitiFX Pro became available on MetaTrader. That same year, the company introduced CitiFX Pro Mobile, a mobile version of the CitiFX Pro trading platform. The platform supported Application Program Interface via FIX protocol (API-FIX) to allow for automated execution of trades for FX traders using automated price feeds into their trading application. This allowed clients to send orders for execution into CitiFX Pro's pricing engine. CitiFX Pro clients also receive access to Citi research.

In 2015, three months after the Swiss National Bank abruptly abolished the floor from the Swiss franc exchange rate, prompting liquidity providers to tighten their conditions Citibank decided to exit the retail forex business and close down the CitiFX Pro unit. On June 26, 2015, it discontinued the service after having sold all US accounts to FXCM, and international accounts to Saxo Bank.

== See also ==
- Currency trading
- Contract for difference
- Citibank
