= ICapital =

American fintech company

Institutional Capital Network, Inc
- Trade name: iCapital
- Type: Private
- Industry: Financial services
- Founded: 2013; 13 years ago
- Headquarters: One Grand Central Place, New York City, U.S.
- Key people: Lawrence Calcano (Chairman & CEO)
- Products: Alternative investments
- Total assets: US$191.2 billion (May 2024)
- Number of employees: 1,510 (2024)
- Website: icapital.com

Institutional Capital Network, Inc (doing business as iCapital) is an American fintech company that provides platform solutions related to alternative investments in the private markets.

== Background ==
iCapital was founded in New York in 2013 with the goal of opening up alternative investments to more investors.

iCapital has made a series of acquisition from banks. In March 2016, iCapital acquired HedgeFocus, a hedge fund business of Credit Suisse that focused on private banking clients. In December 2017, iCapital acquired Deutsche Bank's US private equity access fund platform. In March 2019, iCapital acquired Bank of America’s alternative investment feeder fund operations business. In June 2020, iCapital acquired the feeder fund platform from Wells Fargo’s Global Alternative Investments division.

When BlackRock became an investor of iCapital in 2016, it also negotiated the option to buy all of the company in two to five years. In 2019, Blackrock renegotiated its agreement where it would give up its option to acquire all of iCapital while acquiring additional ownership to remain as iCapital's largest minority shareholder. It was decided it was in the best interests for iCapital to remain independent in the hands of multiple investors.

In February 2024, Institutional Investor reported that more than 100,000 financial advisors used iCapital and it had access to funds from 560 asset managers.

In April 2024, iCapital acquired Mirador, a fintech reporting company. Mirador had strengths in data aggregation which would enhance iCapital's reporting process. In the same month, iCapital launched iCapital Marketplace in Hong Kong and Singapore.

In May 2025, iCapital agreed to acquire Citigroup's wealth alternatives unit, which represents more than 180 funds across private equity, infrastructure, hedge funds and private credit. iCapital will manage and operate the platform, while Citi will serve as the fund distributor and offer client guidance. Terms of the deal were not disclosed.

In 2025, iCapital reached a valuation of $7.5 billion.

The company provides platforms that make alternative investments more accessible to investors. Traditionally, most alternative investment assets have been held by institutional investors due to their complex nature as well as strict regulations. iCapital invests in private funds and assembles the fund allocation into vehicles that can be accessed more broadly by investors.

iCapital has been backed by financial institutions such as banks which include JPMorgan Chase and Morgan Stanley as well as asset management firms which include Blackrock, Fidelity Investments and Blackstone Inc. They have also partnered with iCapital to use its technology platforms.
