= Vikram Pandit =

Indian-American banker (born 1957)

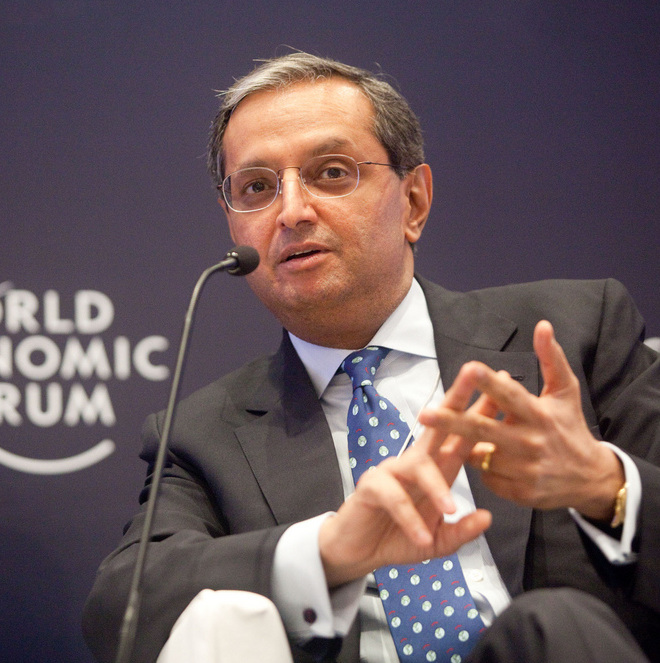
- Vikram Pandit at the World Economic Forum in 2011.
- Born: 14 January 1957 (age 69); Nagpur, Bombay State, India (present-day Maharashtra, India)
- Citizenship: United States
- Education: Columbia University (BS, MS, MBA, PhD)
- Occupation: Chairman and CEO, The Orogen Group
- Years active: 1983–present
- Board member of: Columbia University; Columbia Business School; Indian School of Business; Virtusa; Bombardier Inc.; EXL Service
- Spouse: Swati
- Children: 2
- Awards: Padma Bhushan (2008)

Vikram Shankar Pandit (born 14 January 1957) is an Indian American banker and investor who was the chief executive officer of Citigroup from December 2007 to 16 October 2012 and is the current chairman and chief executive officer of The Orogen Group.

Pandit has been honoured with the Padma Bhushan, the third highest Indian civilian award, for his contributions to the trade and industry in 2008 by the Government of India.

== Early life and education ==
Vikram Pandit was born in Dhantoli locality of Nagpur, Maharashtra, India, to an affluent Marathi family. His father, Shankar B. Pandit, was an executive director at Sarabhai Chemicals in Baroda.

Pandit studied at Bishop Cotton School in Nagpur, and then completed his schooling at the Dadar Parsee Youths Assembly High School in Dadar, Mumbai. The family also briefly moved to Mombasa, Kenya, in 1969. When Pandit was 16 years old, he moved to the United States to attend Columbia University for his undergraduate program and, in 1976, earned his B.S. degree in electrical engineering in only three years. He then completed his M.S. in electrical engineering in 1977. Pandit subsequently turned to economics and finance and earned an MBA and PhD in finance from Columbia Business School in 1986, after publishing a thesis involving a complex financial puzzle, titled "Asset prices in a heterogeneous consumer economy." He taught economics at Columbia as a doctoral student and from 1986 to 1990 was an assistant professor at Indiana University in Bloomington.

== Professional career ==
=== Early career and Morgan Stanley (1983–2005) ===
He joined Morgan Stanley as an associate in 1983, one of the first Indians to join the company.

He was instrumental in building Morgan Stanley's electronic trading platform and prime brokerage division and in 2000, ultimately rose to the post of president and chief operating officer of its worldwide operations of the Institutional securities and Investment banking businesses.

In 2005, after more than two decades with Morgan Stanley, Vikram Pandit decided to leave the firm along with John Havens after being passed over by Philip J. Purcell.

=== Post Morgan Stanley and joining Citigroup (2006–2012) ===
In March 2006, Pandit and John Havens, along with Guru Ramakrishnan (former global head of trading, technology and new products in the equities group at Morgan Stanley), started the hedge fund Old Lane LLC. Citi bought the company in 2007 for $800 million, bringing both Pandit and Havens into Citi leadership. Citi named Pandit chairman and CEO of Citi Alternative Investments (CAI) unit and he later led Citi's Institutional Clients Group.

On 11 December 2007, Pandit was named the new CEO of Citigroup, replacing interim-CEO Sir Winfried Bischoff. Pandit was strongly supported by then interim chairman of Citigroup Robert Rubin, the effective successor to Charles Prince.

On 11 February 2009, Pandit testified to Congress that he had declared to his board of directors, "My salary should be $1 per year with no bonus until we return to profitability." He also struck an apologetic tone for letting the bank consider completing the purchase of a private jet plane after receiving some $45 billion in Troubled Asset Relief Program (TARP) funds. His total 2009 compensation was $128,751, with a base salary of $125,001 and other compensation of $3,750.

In January 2011, after working for two years for a salary of $1 a year, his annual base was raised to $1.75 million for the progress Citi made under Vikram's leadership. After posting five consecutive quarterly profits, Citigroup in May 2011, announced $23.2m retention award to Pandit making him one of the highest paid CEOs. In April 2012, shareholders voted against increasing his pay to $15 million. About 55% of the votes cast were against the compensation package.

His co-chairing of Davos 2012 was criticized, with Mike Mayo, an analyst with Crédit Agricole in New York remarking: "What kind of signal does that send, that the bank that was the worst-performing in our country over the last decade and whose stock price is still down significantly since he took over, is the ambassador for our financial industry?" At Davos 2012, Pandit said that Citigroup was going "back to the basics of banking" in response to public anger about the 2008 financial crisis, and argued that, "The single biggest issue facing us is the question of jobs," giving an estimate of 400 million jobs in the next 10 years.

==== Resignation ====
On 16 October 2012, Pandit unexpectedly resigned as Citigroup CEO. Michael Corbat, previously Citigroup's CEO of Europe, Middle East, and Africa, was named as his replacement. While Pandit and the company maintain that he resigned, Bloomberg News cited anonymous board sources indicating that Pandit was forced out by the board after eroding investor confidence and damaging company relations with regulators over an extended period. The New York Times later identified Chairman Michael E. O'Neill as the driving force behind a months-long secret effort to oust Pandit, which culminated in a surprise ultimatum to Pandit stating that he must resign immediately, resign at the end of the year, or be fired. His resignation followed multiple payouts to investors during ongoing fraud allegations.

==== Compensation ====
While CEO of Citigroup in 2007, Pandit earned an annualized compensation of $3,164,320, which included a base salary of $250,000, stocks granted of $2,914,320, and options granted of $0. In 2008, he earned a total compensation of $38,237,437, which included a base salary of $958,333, stocks granted of $28,830,000, and options granted of $8,432,911. However, after adjusting for Citigroup's sunken share price, the package was worth just a few million dollars. Pandit received $165 million for his hedge fund which was purchased by Citi in 2007. The fund has since been closed. In 2012, Citigroup shareholders voted in favor of a non-binding resolution to reject a $15 million pay package for Pandit. In November 2012, Pandit was paid about $6.7 million.

=== Post-Citigroup ===
It was reported in May 2013 that Pandit and Hari Aiyar, another Indian executive, were acquiring a 3 percent equity stake in JM Financial and launching a $100 million fund to invest in distressed assets. It was reported in May 2016 that Pandit and Atairos Group created a new operating company, The Orogen Group, to invest in financial services companies with backing from Comcast Corporation.

== Board memberships and honors ==
Pandit is a member of the boards of Columbia University, Columbia Business School, the Indian School of Business, American India Foundation and Trinity School. He is also a member of Kappa Beta Phi. He received the 2008 Great Immigrants Award from the Carnegie Corporation of New York.

== Personal life ==
Pandit, a naturalized citizen of the United States, lives in an apartment on the Upper West Side of Manhattan. He and his wife, Swati, have two children.

Ajay Mehta portrayed Pandit in the 2011 television film, Too Big to Fail.

== See also ==
- Indians in the New York City metropolitan region

Business positions
Preceded by Win Bischoff	Citigroup CEO; 2007–2012	Succeeded by Michael Corbat
