= Citibank Russia =

- Native name: Ситибанк
- Type: Joint Stock Company
- Industry: Banking, financial services
- Founded: 1993; 33 years ago
- Headquarters: Moscow, Russia
- Area served: Russia
- Products: Consumer banking, corporate banking, finance, investment banking, private banking, savings, securities, wealth management, credit cards
- Revenue: 41,953,600,000 Russian ruble (2017)
- Operating income: 36,3 billion rubles (2020)
- Net income: 9.3 billion rubles (2020)
- Total assets: 681.8 billion rubles (2020)
- Number of employees: ~3000 (2020)
- Parent: Citigroup
- Website: http://www.citibank.ru

Citibank Russia (Russian: Ситибанк) is a Russian commercial bank, which is part of the financial corporation Citigroup.

== Recent announcements on reducing operations in Russia ==
Citibank Russia branch in 2021

In April 2021, Citi announced its plan to exit Russia consumer banking as part of its global strategic refresh to exit consumer franchises in 14 markets. In March 2022, Citi decided to expand the scope of thе exit of the consumer banking in Russia by including Commercial Banking business in Russia.

On August 25, 2022, Citi announced that as part of its continued efforts to reduce its operations and exposure in Russia, it will wind down its consumer banking and local commercial banking operations in the country.

On October 28, 2022, Citi also announced that AO Citibank agreed to sell a portfolio of ruble-denominated personal installment loans to Uralsib, a Russian commercial bank. Citi also agreed to transfer to Uralsib a portfolio of ruble-denominated credit card balances, subject to customer consents. On December 12, 2022, the rights of the consumer loans of AO Citibank were transferred to Uralsib.

On October 14, 2022, Citi announced that it would be discontinuing nearly all the institutional banking services offered in Russia by the end of March 2023. After that Citi’s only operations in Russia will be those necessary to fulfill its remaining legal and regulatory obligations.

In May 2023, Citi confirmed that it agreed to transfer a portfolio of ruble-denominated credit card balances to Uralsib, subject to customer consents and in compliance with local laws and regulations. This follows Citi’s sale of its Russian consumer personal installment loans to Uralsib in October, and its announcement that its only remaining operations in Russia are those necessary to fulfil its legal and regulatory requirements.

From September 20, 2024, Citibank Russia will stop servicing debit cards. Transfers via the fast payment system and payment via QR code will also become unavailable.

In December 2025, the Russian government has authorised Citigroup to sell its Russian banking unit.

== See also ==
- List of banks in Russia
