= Mark Mason (executive) =

American business executive

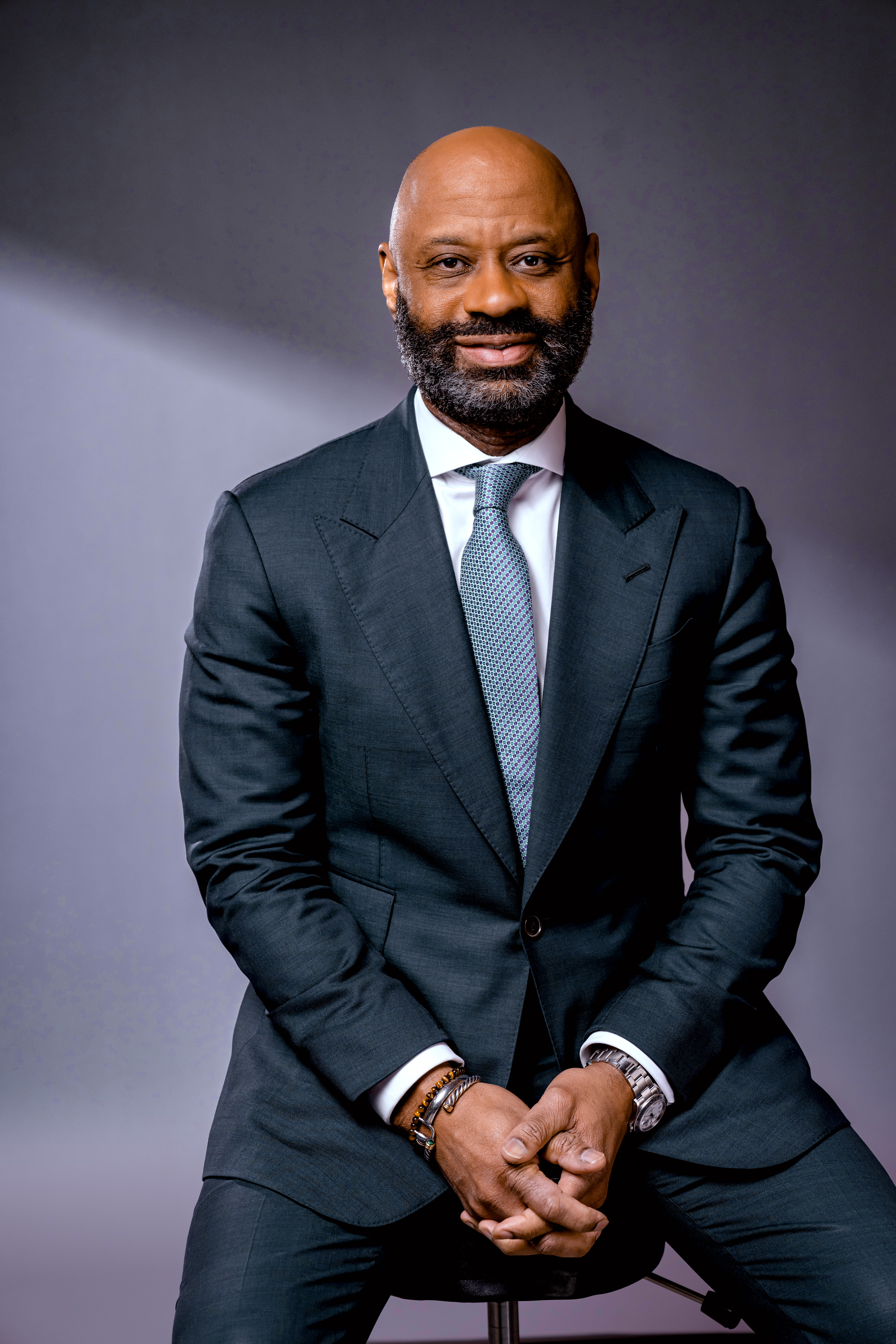
- Mason in December 2023
- Education: Howard University (BBA); Harvard University (MBA)
- Occupation: Chief financial officer (CFO)
- Employer: Citigroup
- Spouse: Carolyn Mason

Mark Mason is an American business executive, serving since 2019 as the chief financial officer (CFO) of Citigroup.

== Early life and education ==
Mason was raised in Queens, New York, and as a teenager he worked for his grandparents, who ran carpentry and landscaping businesses. He earned a Bachelor of Business Administration (BBA) in finance and graduated with honors from Howard University. He then went on to earn a Master of Business Administration (MBA) degree from Harvard Business School. Mark Mason is a brother of Kappa Alpha Psi.

== Career ==
Mason joined Citigroup in 2001 and has held a number of executive positions at the firm, including chief financial officer of Citi’s Institutional Clients Group, chief executive officer of Citi Private Bank, chief executive officer of Citi Holdings, and chief financial officer and head of strategy and M&A for Citi’s Global Wealth Management Division. Mason is currently the firm’s CFO.

== Board membership ==
Mason has been on the board of trustees of Howard University since 2012 and has been vice chair of the board of trustees since July 1, 2017.
