= 388 Greenwich Street =

Office skyscraper in Manhattan, New York

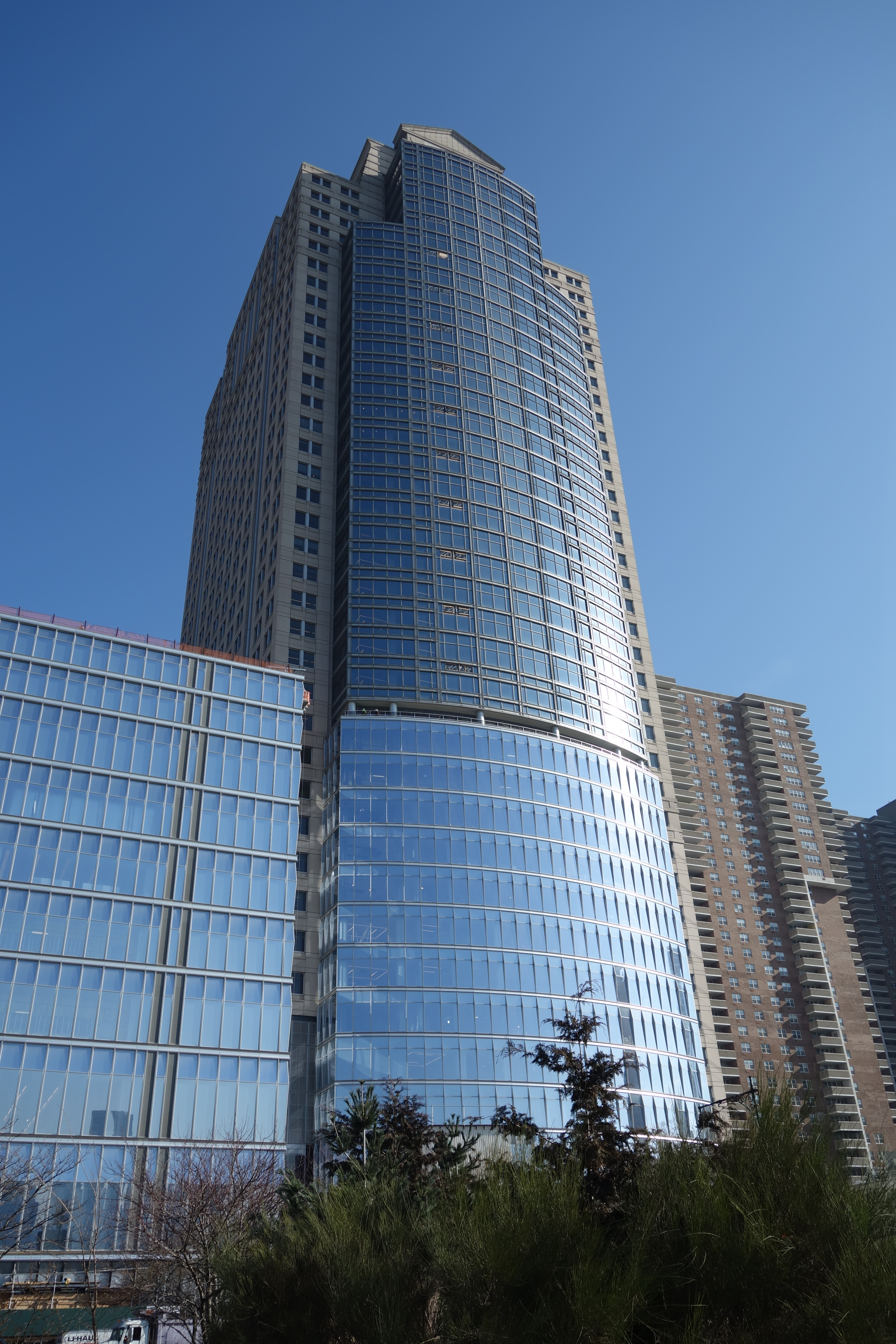
- 388 Greenwich Street in 2019
- Interactive map of the 388 Greenwich Street area

General information
- Type: Office
- Architectural style: Postmodern
- Location: Manhattan, New York City
- Coordinates: 40.720685°N 74.011036°W
- Construction started: February 11, 1986
- Completed: August 10, 1988

Height
- Roof: 151 m (495 ft)
- Top floor: 38

Technical details
- Floor count: 39
- Floor area: 2,700,000 sq ft (250,000 m^{2}) (complex)
- Lifts/elevators: 24, primarily double-deckers

Design and construction
- Architect: Kohn Pedersen Fox Associates PC

388 Greenwich Street, originally called the Shearson Lehman Plaza and more recently the Travelers Building, is an office skyscraper in the Tribeca neighborhood of Lower Manhattan in New York City. The building is located at Greenwich Street, with frontages on North Moore and West Streets. 388 Greenwich Street forms a complex with the neighboring 10-story 390 Greenwich Street near the Hudson River. Currently, the two buildings comprise the global headquarters of financial services corporation Citigroup. 388 Greenwich stands about ten blocks north of the World Trade Center site and is among TriBeCa's tallest. Like many other office buildings in Manhattan, 388 Greenwich Street contains a fitness center, full-service dining facilities, a medical center, a conference center, a day care center, and an outdoor park. The building is one of the few in New York with double-deck elevators. In the aftermath of the September 11 attacks, the building's courtyard was used as a triage center.

== History ==
Construction began in 1985 and was completed in 1988. 388 Greenwich St was designed by architecture firm Kohn Pedersen Fox Associates with structural design by engineering firm Severud Associates.

In December 2007, 388 Greenwich Street and 390 Greenwich Street were sold by Citigroup in order to reduce real estate exposure on its balance sheet. The complex was acquired by a joint venture consisting of SL Green Realty and SITQ for US$1.58 billion. Citigroup, however, maintained their primary presence in the complex through a 15-year leaseback arrangement. In 2016, the bank repurchased the complex and relocated the company's headquarters from 399 Park Avenue.

In 2016, CitiGroup committed to staying in the building and announced a renovation. The exterior makeover, led by Skidmore, Owings & Merrill, included the addition of a glass curtain wall to the lower floors of the tower and all of 390 Greenwich Street on the west side of the complex. Gensler provided interior renovations, including a new lobby.

== Umbrella icon ==
The building had a 50 by 50 ft (15 by 15 m), 4-story neon sign near the top of its northern elevation, which depicted a red umbrella. The sign was erected in May 1997; some observers found it emblematic, while others considered it to be distracting. Complementing this neon sign, an iconic, steel 16-foot (4.9 m), 5,300-pound (2,400 kg) red umbrella sculpture also stood outside 388 Greenwich St at street-level. Both have been removed from the building, the latter in the summer of 2007, as part of a deal between Citigroup and St. Paul Travelers Companies which acquired the logo.
