= Citigroup =

American multinational investment bank and financial services corporation

Citigroup Inc.

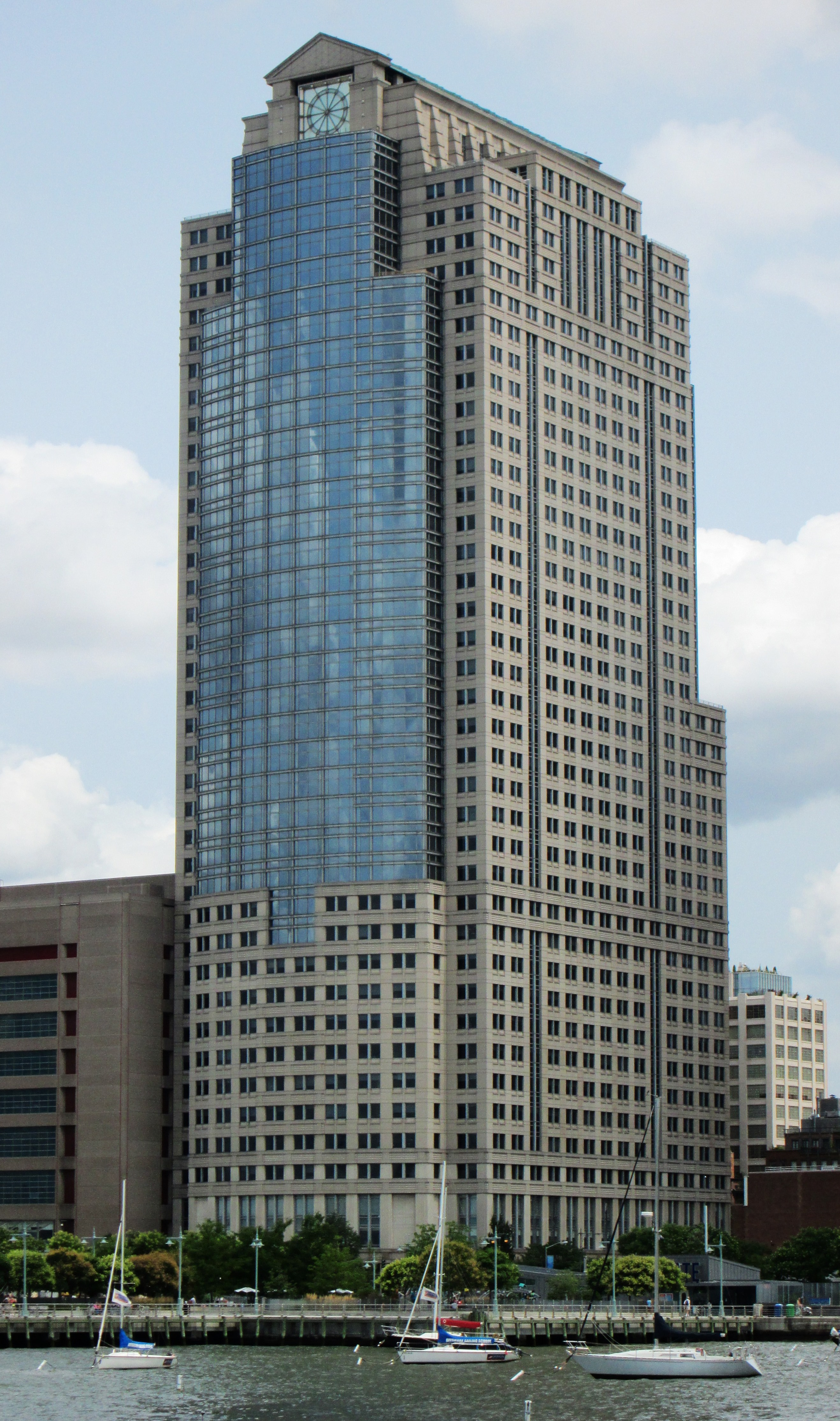
- The headquarters of Citigroup in Lower Manhattan
- Type: Public company
- Traded as: NYSE: C; S&P 100 component; S&P 500 component; DJIA component (until 2009)
- ISIN: US1729674242
- Industry: Financial services
- Predecessors: City Bank of New York (1812); First National Bank of New York (1863); The Travelers Companies (1853)
- Founded: October 8, 1998; 28 years ago
- Headquarters: 388 Greenwich Street; New York City, U.S.
- Area served: Worldwide
- Key people: Jane Fraser (chair & CEO); Viswas Raghavan (executive vice chair); Mark Mason (CFO)
- Products: Asset management; Banking; Commodities; Credit cards; Equities trading; Insurance; Investment management; Mortgage loans; Private equity; Wealth management
- Revenue: ▲US$85.2 billion (2025)
- Operating income: ▲US$19.8 billion (2025)
- Net income: ▲US$14.3 billion (2025)
- AUM: US$2.8 trillion (2026)
- Total assets: ▲US$2.6 trillion (2025)
- Total equity: ▲US$220 billion (2025)
- Number of employees: c. 229,000 (2024)
- Subsidiaries: List of subsidiaries: Bank Handlowy (Poland); Citibank Argentina; Citibank Australia; Citibank (United States); Citibank Bahrain; Citibank China; Citibank Europe; Citi Private Bank; Citibank (Hong Kong); Citibank India; Citigroup Global Markets Japan; Citibank Indonesia; Citibank Korea; Citibank Malaysia; Citibank Russia; Citibank Singapore; Citibank Uganda; Citibank United Arab Emirates; Citi Private Bank; Citi Global Wealth Management; Grupo Financiero Banamex; Beymen; Salomon Brothers; Nikko Cordial; Acciones y Valores de México (Acciones y Valores Banamex, Casa de Bolsa Integrante del Grupo Financiero Banamex); Discover Student Loans; Yield Book; Citigroup Global Markets Inc; Metalmark Capital; Lava Trading
- Capital ratio: Tier 1 15.3% (2024)
- Website: citigroup.com

Citigroup Inc. or Citi (stylized as citi) is an American multinational investment bank and financial services company based in New York City. The company was formed in 1998 by the merger of Citicorp, the bank holding company for Citibank, and Travelers; Travelers was spun off from the company in 2002.

Citigroup is the third-largest banking institution in the United States by assets; alongside JPMorgan Chase, Bank of America, and Wells Fargo, it is one of the Big Four banking institutions of the United States. It is considered a systemically important bank by the Financial Stability Board and is commonly called "too big to fail". It is one of the eight global investment banks in the Bulge Bracket. Citigroup is ranked 36th on the Fortune 500, and was ranked #24 in Forbes Global 2000 in 2023.The company has assets under management of around US$2.8T.

Citigroup operates across five core businesses: Banking & International, which provides investment banking, corporate banking, and commercial banking services; Markets, which provides sales and trading services; Services (formerly known as Treasury and Trade Solutions, or TTS), which provides cash management, payments, trade finance, liquidity management, securities services, and custody banking to corporations, financial institutions, and public-sector clients; Wealth, which comprises Citi's wealth management and retail banking businesses and includes Citibank; and U.S. Consumer Cards, which is the third-largest issuer of credit cards in the United States.

== History ==
The Citigroup logo, 1999–present, used concurrently with a slight 2023 redesign

The Citigroup logo, 2007–2011

Citigroup was formed on October 8, 1998, by the merger of Citicorp, the bank holding company for Citibank, and Travelers. At the time, it was the world's largest financial services organization.

=== Citicorp (1812–1985) ===
Citibank (formerly City Bank of New York) was chartered by the State of New York on June 16, 1812, with $2 million (~$45.8 million in 2025) of capital. Serving a group of New York merchants, the bank opened for business on September 14 of that year, and Samuel Osgood was elected as the first president of the company. After the Panic of 1837, Moses Taylor acquired control of the company. The company's name was changed to The National City Bank of New York in 1865 after it converted its state charter into a federal charter and joined the new U.S. national banking system. After Taylor died in 1882, Percy Rivington Pyne I became president of the bank. He died nine years later and was replaced by James Stillman. The bank became the largest bank in New York City after the Panic of 1893 and the largest bank in the U.S. by 1895. It became the first contributor to the Federal Reserve Bank of New York in 1913, and the following year it inaugurated the first overseas branch of a U.S. bank in Buenos Aires, although the bank had been active in plantation economies, such as the Cuban sugar industry, since the mid-19th century. The purchase of U.S. overseas bank International Banking Corporation in 1918 helped it become the first American bank to surpass $1 billion in assets. During the United States occupation of Haiti and the bank's income from Haiti's loan debt related to the Haiti indemnity controversy, the bank earned some of its largest gains in the 1920s due to debt payments from Haiti, becoming the largest commercial bank in the world in 1929. As it grew, the bank became an innovator in financial services, becoming the first major U.S. bank to offer compound interest on savings (1921); unsecured personal loans (1928); customer checking accounts (1936) and the negotiable certificate of deposit (1961).

The bank merged with First National Bank of New York in 1955, becoming the First National City Bank of New York in 1955. The "New York" was dropped in 1962 on the 150th anniversary of the company's foundation. The company organically entered the leasing and credit card sectors, and its introduction of U.S. dollar-denominated certificates of deposit in London marked the first new negotiable instrument in the market since 1888. The bank introduced its First National City Charge Service credit card—popularly known as the "Everything card" and later to become MasterCard—in 1967. Also in 1967, First National City Bank was reorganized as a one-bank holding company, First National City Corporation, or "Citicorp" for short. The bank had been nicknamed "Citibank" since the 1860s when it began using this as an eight-letter wire code address.

In 1974, under the leadership of CEO Walter B. Wriston, First National City Corporation changed its formal name to "Citicorp", with First National City Bank being formally renamed Citibank in 1976. Shortly afterwards, the bank launched the Citicard, which pioneered the use of 24-hour ATMs. John S. Reed was elected CEO in 1984, and Citi became a founding member of the CHAPS clearing house in London. Under his leadership, the next 14 years would see Citibank become the largest bank in the United States and the largest issuer of credit cards and charge cards in the world, and expand its global reach to over 90 countries.

=== Travelers Group (1986–2007) ===
The corporate logo of Travelers Inc. (1993–1998) prior to the merger with Citicorp

Travelers Group, at the time of the merger, was a diverse group of financial concerns that had been brought together under CEO Sandy Weill. Its roots came from Commercial Credit, a subsidiary of Control Data Corporation that was taken private by Weill in November 1986 after taking charge of the company earlier that year. Two years later, Weill mastered the buyout of Primerica Financial Services—a conglomerate that had already bought life insurance company A L Williams as well as brokerage firm Smith Barney. The new company took the Primerica name, and employed a "cross-selling" strategy such that each of the entities within the parent company aimed to sell each other's services. Its non-financial businesses were spun off.

In September 1992, Travelers Insurance, which had suffered from poor real estate investments and sustained significant losses in the aftermath of Hurricane Andrew, formed a strategic alliance with Primerica that would lead to its amalgamation into a single company in December 1993. With the acquisition, the group became Travelers Inc. Property & casualty and life & annuities underwriting capabilities were added to the business. Meanwhile, the distinctive Travelers red umbrella logo, which was also acquired in the deal, was applied to all the businesses within the newly named organization. During this period, Travelers acquired Shearson Lehman—a retail brokerage and asset management firm that was headed by Weill until 1985—and merged it with Smith Barney.

==== Ownership of Salomon Brothers (1997–2003) ====
In November 1997, Travelers Group (which had been renamed again in April 1995 when they merged with Aetna Property and Casualty, Inc.), acquired Salomon Brothers, a major bond dealer and bulge bracket investment bank, in a $9 billion (~$16.7 billion in 2025) transaction. This deal complemented Travelers/Smith Barney well as Salomon was focused on fixed-income and institutional clients, whereas Smith Barney was strong in equities and retail. Salomon Brothers absorbed Smith Barney into the new securities unit termed Salomon Smith Barney; a year later, the division incorporated Citicorp's former securities operations as well. The Salomon Smith Barney name was abandoned in October 2003 after a series of financial scandals that tarnished the bank's reputation.

=== Merger of Citicorp and Travelers (1998–2001) ===
On April 6, 1998, Citicorp and Travelers announced a merger, which would enable Travelers and Citicorp to access each other's customer base for the marketing of financial products.

In the transaction, Travelers Group acquired all Citicorp shares; existing shareholders of each company owned about half of the new firm. While the new company maintained Citicorp's "Citi" brand in its name, it adopted Travelers' distinctive "red umbrella" as the new corporate logo, which was used until 2007.

The chairmen of both parent companies, John S. Reed and Sandy Weill respectively, were announced as co-chairmen and co-CEOs of the new company, Citigroup, Inc., although the vast difference in management styles between the two immediately presented question marks over the wisdom of such a setup.

The remaining provisions of the Glass–Steagall Act—enacted following the Great Depression—forbade banks to merge with insurance underwriters, and meant Citigroup had between two and five years to divest any prohibited assets. Weill stated at the time of the merger that they believed "that over that time the legislation will change ... we have had enough discussions to believe this will not be a problem". Indeed, the passing of the Gramm-Leach-Bliley Act in November 1999 vindicated Reed and Weill's views, opening the door to financial services conglomerates offering a mix of commercial banking, investment banking, insurance underwriting, and brokerage.

Joe J. Plumeri worked on the post-merger integration of the two companies and was appointed CEO of Citibank North America by Weill and Reed. He oversaw its network of 450 branches. J. Paul Newsome, an analyst with CIBC Oppenheimer, said: "He's not the spit-and-polish executive many people expected. He's rough on the edges. But Citibank knows the bank as an institution is in trouble—it can't get away anymore with passive selling—and Plumeri has all the passion to throw a glass of cold water on the bank." Plumeri boosted the unit's earnings from $108 million to $415 million in one year, an increase of nearly 300%. He unexpectedly retired from Citibank in January 2000.

In 2000, Citigroup acquired Associates First Capital Corporation for $31.1 billion in stock, which, until 1989, had been owned by Gulf+Western (now part of National Amusements), and later by Ford Motor Credit Company. The Associates was widely criticized for predatory lending practices and Citi eventually settled with the Federal Trade Commission by agreeing to pay $240 million to customers who had been victims of a variety of predatory practices, including "flipping" mortgages, "packing" mortgages with optional credit insurance, and deceptive marketing practices.

In 2001, Citigroup made additional acquisitions: European American Bank, in July, for $1.9 billion, and Banamex in August, for $12.5 billion.

=== Spin-off of Travelers (2002) ===
The current logo for Travelers Companies

The company spun off its Travelers Property and Casualty insurance underwriting business in 2002. The spin-off was prompted by the insurance unit's drag on Citigroup stock price because Travelers earnings were more seasonal and vulnerable to large disasters and events such as the September 11 attacks. It was also difficult to sell insurance directly to its customers since most customers were accustomed to purchasing insurance through a broker.

Travelers merged with The St. Paul Companies Inc. in 2004 forming The St. Paul Travelers Companies. Citigroup retained the life insurance and annuities underwriting businesses until it sold them to MetLife in 2005.

In spite of divesting Travelers Insurance, Citigroup retained Travelers' signature red umbrella logo as its own until February 2007, when Citigroup agreed to sell the logo back to St. Paul Travelers, which renamed itself Travelers Companies. Citigroup also decided to adopt the corporate brand "Citi" for itself and virtually all its subsidiaries, except Primerica and Banamex.

=== Subprime mortgage crisis (2007) ===
Heavy exposure to troubled mortgages in the form of collateralized debt obligation (CDOs), compounded by poor risk management, led Citigroup into trouble as the subprime mortgage crisis worsened in 2007. The company had used elaborate mathematical risk models which looked at mortgages in particular geographical areas, but never included the possibility of a national housing downturn or the prospect that millions of mortgage holders would default on their mortgages. Trading head Thomas Maheras was close friends with senior risk officer David Bushnell, which undermined risk oversight. As Treasury Secretary, Robert Rubin was said to be influential in lifting the Glass–Steagall Act that allowed Travelers and Citicorp to merge in 1998. Then on the board of directors of Citigroup, Rubin and Charles Prince were said to be influential in pushing the company towards MBS and CDOs in the subprime mortgage market.

Starting in June 2006, Senior Vice President Richard M. Bowen III, the chief underwriter of Citigroup's Consumer Lending Group, began warning the board of directors about the extreme risks being taken on by the mortgage operation that could potentially result in massive losses. The group bought and sold $90 billion of residential mortgages annually. Bowen's responsibility was essential to serve as the quality control supervisor ensuring the unit's creditworthiness. When Bowen first became a whistleblower in 2006, 60% of the mortgages were defective. The number of bad mortgages began increasing throughout 2007 and eventually exceeded 80% of the volume. Many of the mortgages were not only defective but were a result of mortgage fraud. Bowen attempted to rouse the board via weekly reports and other communications. On November 3, 2007, Bowen emailed Citigroup chairman Robert Rubin and the bank's chief financial officer, head auditor, and the chief risk management officer to again expose the risk and potential losses, claiming that the group's internal controls had broken down and requesting an outside investigation of his business unit. The subsequent investigation revealed that the Consumer Lending Group had suffered a breakdown of internal controls since 2005. Despite the findings of the investigation, Bowen's charges were ignored, even though withholding such information from shareholders violated the Sarbanes–Oxley Act (SOX), which he had pointed out. Citigroup CEO Charles Prince signed a certification that the bank was in compliance with SOX despite Bowen revealing this wasn't so. Citigroup eventually stripped Bowen of most of his responsibilities and informed him that his physical presence was no longer required at the bank. The Financial Crisis Inquiry Commission asked him to testify about Citigroup's role in the mortgage crisis, and he did so, appearing as one of the first witnesses before the Commission in April 2010.

As the crisis began to unfold, Citigroup announced on April 11, 2007, that it would eliminate 17,000 jobs, or about 5% of its workforce, in a broad restructuring designed to cut costs and bolster its long underperforming stock. Even after securities and brokerage firm Bear Stearns ran into serious trouble in summer 2007, Citigroup decided the possibility of trouble with its CDOs was so tiny (less than 1/100 of 1%) that it excluded them from its risk analysis. With the crisis worsening, Citigroup announced on January 7, 2008, that it was considering cutting another 5 percent to 10 percent of its 327,000 member-workforce.

In October 2007, analyst Meredith Whitney co-wrote a report for a branch of Canadian Imperial Bank of Commerce (CIBC) which downgraded Citigroup stock on the basis the company's dividend payouts were in excess of profits. Whitney and Carla Krawiec said the company was in a dangerous predicament unless they raised some US $30 billion, sold assets, and/or dramatically reduced the dividend. The CIBC report earned major news coverage, and was credited with a triggering a steep drop in Citigroup stock and contributing to the resignation of CEO Charles Prince within a few weeks before the company "slashed the dividend" in January 2008.

=== Failed takeover of Nikko Asset Management ===
In 2007, Citigroup acquired 61% of Nikko Asset Management for $7.7 billion to take majority control in what was then the largest foreign buyout ever of a Japanese company. Citigroup attempted to buy out the remaining shares of Nikko later that year at a cost of $4.6 billion to take full control of the company. Two years later, Citigroup sold its stake to Sumitomo Trust and Banking Co, a subsidiary of Sumitomo Mitsui Trust Holdings, for $795 million as it retreated from Japan.

=== Collapse and US government intervention (2008) ===
By July 2008 Citigroup was described as struggling, and by November it was insolvent, despite its receipt of $25 billion (~$36.7 billion in 2025) in taxpayer-funded federal Troubled Asset Relief Program funds. On November 17, 2008, Citigroup announced plans for about 52,000 new job cuts, on top of 23,000 cuts already made during 2008 in a huge job cull resulting from four-quarters of consecutive losses and reports that it was unlikely to be in profit again before 2010. The same day on Wall Street markets responded, with shares falling and dropping the company's market capitalization to $6 billion, down from $300 billion two years prior. Eventually staff cuts totaled over 100,000 employees. Its stock market value dropped to $20.5 billion, down from $244 billion two years earlier. Shares of Citigroup common stock traded well below $1.00 on the New York Stock Exchange.

As a result, late in the evening on November 23, 2008, Citigroup and Federal regulators approved a plan to stabilize the company and forestall a further deterioration in the company's value. On November 24, 2008, the U.S. government announced a massive bailout for Citigroup designed to rescue the company from bankruptcy while giving the government a major say in its operations. A joint statement by the US Treasury Department, the Federal Reserve and the Federal Deposit Insurance Corporation (FDIC) announced: "With these transactions, the U.S. government is taking the actions necessary to strengthen the financial system and protect U.S. taxpayers and the U.S. economy."

==== TARP funding ====
Citi received the largest amount of TARP funding, "a larger bailout than any other U.S. bank". The bailout called for the government to back about $306 billion in loans and securities and directly invest about $20 billion in the company. The Treasury provided $20 billion in Troubled Asset Relief Program (TARP) funds in addition to $25 billion given in October. The Treasury Department, the Federal Reserve and the FDIC agreed to cover 90% of the losses on Citigroup's $335 billion portfolio after Citigroup absorbed the first $29 billion in losses. The Treasury would assume the first $5 billion in losses; the FDIC would absorb the next $10 billion; then the Federal Reserve would assume the rest of the risk. The assets remained on Citigroup's balance sheet; the technical term for this arrangement is ring fencing.

In return, the bank gave the U.S. Treasury $27 billion of preferred shares and warrants to acquire common stock. The government obtained wide powers over banking operations. Citigroup agreed to try to modify mortgages, using standards set up by the FDIC after the collapse of IndyMac Bank, with the goal of keeping as many homeowners as possible in their houses. Executive salaries would be capped. As a condition of the federal assistance, Citigroup's dividend payment was reduced to $0.01 per share.

In a New York Times op-ed, Michael Lewis and David Einhorn described the November 2008 $306 billion (~$449 billion in 2025) guarantee as "an undisguised gift" without any real crisis motivating it.

According to The Wall Street Journal, the government aid provided to Citi in 2008/2009 was provided to prevent a worldwide chaos and panic by the potential collapse of its Global Transactions Services (now TTS) division. According to the article, former CEO Pandit said if Citigroup was allowed to unravel into bankruptcy, "100 governments around the world would be trying to figure out how to pay their employees".

According to New York Attorney General Andrew Cuomo, Citigroup paid hundreds of millions of dollars in bonuses to more than 1,038 of its employees after it had received its $45 billion (~$66 billion in 2025) TARP funds in late 2008. This included 738 employees each receiving $1 million in bonuses, 176 employees each receiving $2 million bonuses, 124 each receiving $3 million in bonuses, and 143 each receiving bonuses of $4 million to more than $10 million. As a result of the criticism and the U.S. Government's majority holding of Citigroup's common stock, compensation and bonuses were restricted from February 2009 until December 2010.

In 2009, Jane Fraser, the CEO of Citi Private Bank, stopped paying its bankers with a commission for selling investment products, in a move to bolster Citi Private Bank's reputation as an independent wealth management adviser, as opposed to a product pusher.

=== Creation of Citi Holdings (2009) ===
On January 16, 2009, Citigroup announced its intention to reorganize itself into two operating units: Citicorp for its retail and institutional client business, and Citi Holdings for its brokerage and asset management. Citigroup will continue to operate as a single company for the time being, but Citi Holdings managers will be tasked to "take advantage of value-enhancing disposition and combination opportunities as they emerge", and eventual spin-offs or mergers involving either operating unit were not ruled out. Citi Holdings consists of Citi businesses that Citi wants to sell and are not considered part of Citi's core businesses. The majority of its assets are U.S. mortgages. It was created in the wake of the financial crisis as part of Citi's restructuring plan. It consists of several business entities including remaining interests in local consumer lending such as OneMain Financial, divestitures such as Smith Barney, and a special asset pool. Citi Holdings represents $156 billion of GAAP assets, or ~8% of Citigroup; 59% represents North American mortgages, 18% operating businesses, 13% special asset pool, and 10% categorized as other. Operating businesses include OneMain Financial ($10B), PrimeRe ($7B), MSSB JV ($8B) and Spain / Greece retail ($4B), less associated loan loss reserves. While Citi Holdings is a mixed bag, its primary objective is to wind down some non-core businesses and reduce assets, and strategically "breaking even" in 2015.

On February 27, 2009, Citigroup announced that the U.S. government would take a 36% equity stake in the company by converting US$25 billion in emergency aid into common stock with a United States Treasury credit line of $45 billion to prevent the bankruptcy of the company. The government guaranteed losses on more than $300 billion of troubled assets and injected $20 billion immediately into the company. The salary of the CEO was set at $1 per year and the highest salary of employees was restricted to $500,000. Any compensation amount above $500,000 had to be paid with restricted stock that could not be sold by the employee until the emergency government aid was repaid in full. The U.S. government also gained control of half the seats in the board of directors, and the senior management was subjected to removal by the US government if there were poor performance. By December 2009, the U.S. government stake was reduced from a 36% stake to a 27% stake, after Citigroup sold $21 billion of common shares and equity in the largest single share sale in U.S. history, surpassing Bank of America's $19 billion share sale 1 month prior. By December 2010, Citigroup repaid the emergency aid in full and the U.S. government had made a $12 billion (~$17.3 billion in 2025) profit on its investment in the company. Government restrictions on pay and oversight of the senior management were removed after the U.S. government sold its remaining 27% stake in December 2010.

On June 1, 2009, it was announced that Citigroup would be removed from the Dow Jones Industrial Average effective June 8, 2009, due to significant government ownership. Citigroup was replaced by Travelers Co.

==== Sale of Smith Barney (2009) ====
Smith Barney, Citi's global private wealth management unit, provided brokerage, investment banking and asset management services to corporations, governments and individuals around the world. With over 800 offices worldwide, Smith Barney held 9.6 million domestic client accounts, representing $1.562 trillion in client assets worldwide.

On January 13, 2009, Citi announced the merger of Smith Barney with Morgan Stanley Wealth Management. Citi received $2.7 billion and a 49% interest in the joint venture.

In June 2013, Citi sold its remaining 49% stake in Smith Barney to Morgan Stanley Wealth Management for $13.5 billion following an appraisal by Perella Weinberg.

=== Return to profitability, denationalization (2010) ===
In 2010, Citigroup achieved its first profitable year since 2007. It reported $10.6 billion in net profit, compared with a $1.6 billion loss in 2009. Late in 2010, the government sold its remaining stock holding in the company, yielding an overall net profit to taxpayers of $12 billion (~$17.3 billion in 2025). A special IRS tax exception given to Citi allowed the US Treasury to sell its shares at a profit, while it still owned Citigroup shares, which eventually netted $12 billion. According to Treasury spokeswoman Nayyera Haq, "This (IRS tax) rule was designed to stop corporate raiders from using loss corporations to evade taxes and was never intended to address the unprecedented situation where the government owned shares in banks. And it was certainly not written to prevent the government from selling its shares for a profit."

=== Expansion of retail banking operations (2011) ===
In 2011, Citi was the first bank to introduce digitized Smart Banking branches in Washington, D.C., New York, Tokyo and Busan (South Korea) while it continued renovating its entire branch network. New sales and service centers were also opened in Moscow and St. Petersburg. Citi Express modules, 24-hour service units, were introduced in Colombia. Citi opened additional branches in China, expanding its branch presence to 13 cities in China.

=== Expansion of credit card operations (2011) ===
Citi Branded Cards introduced several new products in 2011, including: Citi ThankYou, Citi Executive/AAdvantage and Citi Simplicity cards in the U.S. It also has Latin America partnership cards with Colombia-based airline Avianca and with Banamex and AeroMexico; and a merchant loyalty program in Europe. Citibank is also the first and currently the only international bank to be approved by Chinese regulators to issue credit cards under its own brand without cooperating with Chinese state-owned domestic banks.

=== Chinese investment banking joint venture (2012) ===
In 2012, the Global Markets division and Orient Securities formed Citi Orient Securities, a Shanghai-based equity and debt brokerage operating in the Chinese market. In January 2019, Citigroup announced that it sold its stake in the business to its Chinese partner.

=== Federal Reserve stress tests (2012–2016) ===
The company failed the Comprehensive Capital Analysis and Review stress tests in 2012 due to Citi's high capital return plan and its international loans, which were rated by the Fed to be at higher risk than its domestic American loans. In 2013, Sanjiv Das was replaced as head of CitiMortgage with Jane Fraser, former head of Citi Private Bank. The company failed the stress tests again in 2014, this time due to qualitative concerns. However, it passed the stress tests in 2015 and in 2016.

In February 2016, the company was subject to a $1.1 billion fraud lawsuit filed by lender Rabobank and other investors as a result of the bankruptcy of Oceanografia SA, a Mexican oil services firm. The plaintiffs claimed that Citigroup conspired with Oceanografia to accept falsified work estimates. The courts found in favor of Citigroup. In April 2016, Citigroup announced that it would eliminate its bad bank, Citi Holdings.

==== Spin-off of Napier Park Global Capital (2013) ====
Under the leadership of CEO Michael Corbat, Citi Capital Advisors (CCA), formerly Citi Alternative Investments, was a hedge fund that offered various investment strategies across multiple asset classes. To comply with the Volcker Rule, which limits bank ownership in hedge funds to no more than 3%, Citi spun off its hedge fund unit in 2013 and gave a majority of the company to its managers. The spin-off of CCA created Napier Park Global Capital, a $6.8 billion hedge fund with more than 100 employees in New York and London and managed by Jim O'Brien and Jonathan Dorfman.

==== Downsizing of consumer banking unit (2014) ====
In October 2014, Citigroup announced its exit from consumer banking in 11 markets, including Costa Rica, El Salvador, Guatemala, Nicaragua, Panama, Peru, Japan, Guam, the Czech Republic, Egypt, South Korea (consumer finance only), and Hungary.

=== 2015 onwards ===
In May 2015, the bank announced the sale of its margin foreign exchange business, including CitiFX Pro and TradeStream, to FXCM and SAXO Bank of Denmark. Despite this deal, industry surveys pegged Citi as the biggest banking player in the forex market. The company's remaining foreign exchange sales & trading businesses continued operating in the wake of this deal under the leadership of James Bindler, who succeeded Jeff Feig as the firm's global head of foreign exchange in 2014.

In November 2015, Springleaf acquired OneMain Financial from Citigroup.

In February 2016, Citi sold its retail and commercial banking operations in Panama and Costa Rica to the Bank of Nova Scotia (Scotiabank) for $360 million (~$473 million in 2025). The operations sold include 27 branches serving approximately 250,000 clients. Citi continues to offer corporate and institutional banking and wealth management in Panama and Costa Rica. On April 1, Citigroup became the exclusive issuer of Costco-branded credit cards. In April 2016, Citi was given regulatory approval for its "living will", its plans to shut down operations in the event of another financial crisis.

In response to the COVID-19 pandemic, Citi provided support to cardholders including waiving late fees. It also announced that some lower paid employees would receive a one-off payment of US$1,000 to help them through the crisis. This was not just limited to the US. In Singapore where Citi had a large operation, low paid staff would receive S$1,200.

In August 2020, Citi mistakenly wired $900 million (~$1.1 billion in 2025) to the creditors of one of its clients, the American cosmetics corporation Revlon. Citi sued to get most of the money back but as of June 2022 had been unsuccessful. In October, the same year, Citigroup was fined $400 million by the US bank regulators as a result of its risk in control systems and was ordered to update its technology. The company will have four months to make a new plan and submit it to the Federal Reserve. In November 2026, Citigroup was reported to have underestimated the risk-weighted assets of a European subsidiary by about $35 billion due to incorrectly recorded trades and an unapproved risk model. The bank said it fixed the issue in summer 2026 and added capital to the subsidiary. The error was about 2.7% of Citigroup's total risk-weighted assets, which were around $1.2 trillion.

In November 2023, Citigroup began initiating layoffs as part of a corporate overhaul. The layoffs were part of a restructuring plan announced by CEO Jane Fraser, which includes the formation of five new divisions and the departure of several senior executives. The move was in response to Citigroup's stock performance and increased expenses. The full extent of the job cuts, referred to internally as "Project Bora Bora", were reported to involve a reduction of at least 10% or 20 000 of the workforce in several departments.

In 2025, Citigroup agreed to sell its wealth alternatives unit, Citi Global Alternatives, to iCapital, a New York-based alternative investment solutions firm. Terms of the deal were not disclosed.

==== Combination of Markets and Securities Services (2019) ====
In 2019, Citi combined its Global Markets and Securities Services business into Markets & Securities Services, which includes broad trading and execution capabilities in addition to custody, clearing, financing and hedging services.

==== Shrinking of consumer banking unit (2021–2025) ====
In February 2021, Jane Fraser, became CEO of the company, the first female CEO of a Big Four bank.

In April 2021, Citi announced it would exit its consumer banking operations in 13 markets, including Australia, Bahrain, China, India, Indonesia, South Korea, Malaysia, the Philippines, Poland, Russia, Taiwan, Thailand and Vietnam. In January 2022, it was announced that UOB would purchase Citi's consumer banking business in Indonesia, Malaysia, Thailand, and Vietnam for approximately $4.9bn. In August 2023, it was announced DBS Bank had acquired Citi's consumer banking business in Taiwan, Citi Consumer Taiwan, for a total consideration of $706m. Citi will continue to operate its consumer banking businesses in the US, Canada, Europe and in only 4 other markets: Hong Kong, Singapore, London and the UAE across the entire APAC and EMEA regions.

In January 2022, Citi further announced its plan to exit consumer banking in Mexico, as well as small-business and middle-market banking operations. On March 1, 2022, Citi disclosed an exposure of over $10bn in Russian assets, which may be materially affected by Russia's expulsion from the SWIFT banking system.

In September 2022, Citi was planning to shutter its retail bank business in the United Kingdom. In January 2024, Citi announced that it would be cutting 20,000 jobs from the company. In June 2024, at its biennial Investor Day, Jane focused the conversation on Citi's Securities Services business, the most profitable of its five business units.

In 2023, United Overseas Bank acquired Citi’s Vietnam business as part of a larger deal that also includes Malaysia, Thailand and Indonesia. Meanwhile, Citi’s India consumer business will transfer to Axis Bank.

In June 2024, Citi completed sale of onshore Consumer Wealth portfolio in China to HSBC, including the transfer of more than 300 employees. As part of a previously signed agreement, Citi will also transfer its remaining credit card portfolio in China to Fubon Bank China later this year.

In October 2024, it was reported that the company would move significant portions of its financial infrastructure to Google Cloud.

In December 2024, Citigroup along with Bank of America announced that they are exiting the Net-Zero Banking Alliance (NZBA).

In March 2025, Citigroup seeks to reduce reliance on external IT contractors, cutting their share by 20% to 50%. It intends to hire full-time employees instead, increasing its technology workforce to 50,000. Improved risk management, data governance after regulatory penalties, including a $136 million for data issues, have prompted such measures. A recent $22.9 million fraud case which involved external contractors is also cited by Citigroup as a reason for the shift. The bank intend to reduce its external suppliers from 144 to 50 and plans to shift IT operations from Rutherford, NJ, to Jersey City. The bank’s stock fell 0.7%, accumulating a 4.4% loss for the year.

==== Involvement in controlling the sale of guns ====
In 2018, The New York Times reported about Citi's actions, under the direction of CEO Michael Corbat, to intervene in the matter of gun control. In particular, its credit card policies were set to restrict the sale of guns below age 21.

== Offices ==
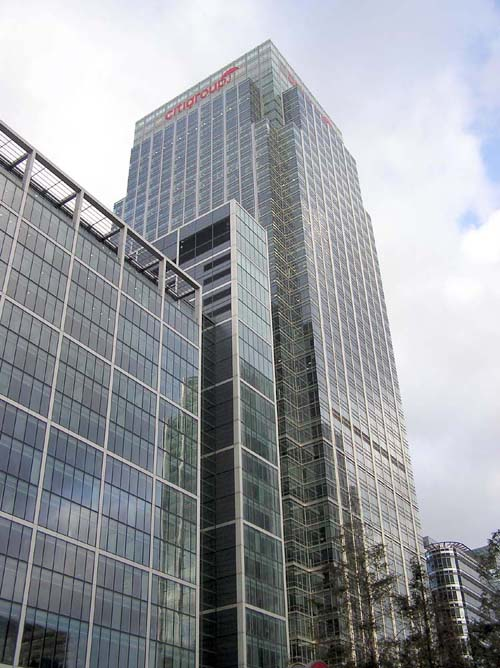
Citigroup EMEA headquarters at the Citigroup Centre (London), Canary Wharf, London

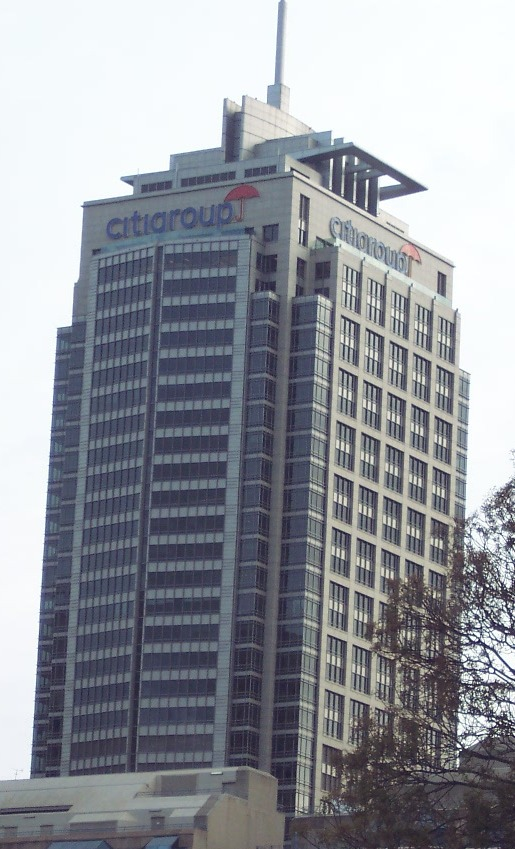
Citigroup Centre (Sydney)

=== New York City ===
The company operates offices in the following buildings:

- 388 Greenwich Street (Manhattan), its global headquarters
- Citigroup Center, a diagonal-roof skyscraper in Midtown Manhattan
- 787 Seventh Avenue (Manhattan)
- 666 Fifth Avenue (Manhattan)
- 399 Park Avenue (Manhattan)
- 485 Lexington Avenue (Manhattan)
- One Court Square (Long Island City, Queens)

=== Citigroup EMEA ===
Citigroup Centre, Canary Wharf, London

=== Citibank Vietnam ===
Citibank first opened a branch in Vietnam prior to 1975. In 1993, Citi returned to Vietnam and established a representative office in Hanoi. Citi established the first fully operational U.S. bank branch in Hanoi in 1994. Following the branch opening in Ho Chi Minh City in 1998, Citi established its retail banking franchise in Vietnam in 2009.

=== Naming rights to Citi Field ===
Citigroup owns the naming rights to Citi Field, the home ballpark of the New York Mets Major League Baseball team, via a $400 million (~$583 million in 2025), 20-year deal that commenced with the stadium opening in 2009.

=== Sioux Falls ===
Citibank moved its credit card operations to Sioux Falls, South Dakota, in 1981 after that state eliminated caps on interest rates.

== Regulatory action, lawsuits, and arbitration ==
In 2004, Japanese regulators took action against Citibank Japan loaning to a customer involved in stock manipulation. The regulator suspended bank activities in one branch and three offices and restricted its consumer banking division. In 2009, Japanese regulators again took action against Citibank Japan, because the bank had not set up an effective money laundering monitoring system. The regulators suspended sales operations within Citibank's retail banking for a month.

On March 23, 2005, the National Association of Securities Dealers, the former name of the American self-regulatory organization for broker-dealers, now known as the Financial Industry Regulatory Authority (FInRA) announced total fines of $21.25 million against Citigroup Global Markets, Inc., American Express Financial Advisors and Chase Investment Services regarding suitability and supervisory violations of its mutual fund sales practices between January 2002 and July 2003. The case against Citigroup involved recommendations and sales of Class B and Class C shares of mutual funds.

On June 6, 2007, FInRA announced more than $15 million (~$22.4 million in 2025) in fines and restitution against Citigroup Global Markets, Inc., to settle charges related to misleading documents and inadequate disclosure in retirement seminars and meetings for BellSouth Corp. employees in North Carolina and South Carolina. FInRA found that Citigroup did not properly supervise a team of brokers located in Charlotte, N.C., who used misleading sales materials during dozens of seminars and meetings for hundreds of BellSouth employees.

In July 2010, Citigroup agreed to pay $75 million (~$108 million in 2025) to settle civil charges that it misled investors over potential losses from high-risk mortgages. The U.S. Securities and Exchange Commission said that Citigroup had made misleading statements about the company's exposure to subprime mortgages. In 2007, Citigroup indicated that its exposure was less than $13 billion, when in fact it was over $50 billion.

In April 2011, an arbitration panel ordered Citigroup Inc to pay $54.1 million for losses from municipal securities funds that cratered between 2007 and 2008.

In August 2012, Citigroup agreed to pay almost $25 million (~$34.6 million in 2025) to settle an investor lawsuit alleging the bank misled investors about the nature of mortgage-backed securities. The lawsuit was on behalf of investors who purchased certificates in one of two mortgage-backed securities trusts from Citigroup Mortgage Loan Trust Inc in 2007.

In February 2012, Citigroup agreed to pay $158.3 million (~$219 million in 2025) to settle claims that it falsely certified the quality of loans issued by its CitiMortgage unit over a period of more than six years, so that they would qualify for insurance from the Federal Housing Administration. The lawsuit was initially brought by Sherry Hunt, a CitiMortgage employee.

On February 9, 2012, it was announced that the five largest mortgage servicers (Ally/GMAC, Bank of America, Citi, JPMorgan Chase, and Wells Fargo) agreed to a historic settlement with the federal government and 49 states. The settlement, known as the National Mortgage Settlement (NMS), required the servicers to provide about $26 billion in relief to distressed homeowners and in-direct payments to the states and the federal government. This settlement amount makes the NMS the second largest civil settlement in U.S. history, only trailing the Tobacco Master Settlement Agreement. The five banks were also required to comply with 305 new mortgage servicing standards. Oklahoma held out and agreed to settle with the banks separately.

In 2014, Citigroup agreed to pay $7 billion (~$9.36 billion in 2025) to resolve claims it misled investors about shoddy mortgage-backed securities in the run-up to the financial crisis. Attorney General Eric H. Holder Jr. said "The bank's misconduct was egregious. ... As a result of their assurances that toxic financial products were sound, Citigroup was able to expand its market share and increase profits" and that "the settlement did not absolve the bank or its employees from facing criminal charges."

In July 2015, Citigroup was fined $70 million by the United States Consumer Financial Protection Bureau and the Office of the Comptroller of the Currency, and ordered to pay $700 million to customers. Citigroup had conducted illegal practices in marketing add-on products for credit cards, including credit monitoring, debt-protection products and wallet-protection services.

In January 2017, Citigroup Global Markets Inc. was fined $25 million (~$32.2 million in 2025) by the Commodity Futures Trading Commission for order spoofing in U.S. Treasury futures markets, i.e., placing orders that were intended to be canceled before execution, and for failing to diligently supervise its employees with regard to spoofing.

=== Enron, WorldCom, and Global Crossing bankruptcies ===
On October 22, 2001, Citigroup was sued for violating federal securities laws by misrepresenting Citigroup's Enron-related exposure in its 2001 Annual Report and elsewhere, and failing to disclose the true extent of Citigroup's legal liability arising out of its 'structured finance' deals with Enron. In 2003, Citigroup paid $145 million (~$243 million in 2025) in fines and penalties to settle claims by the Securities and Exchange Commission and the Manhattan district attorney's office.

In 2004, Citigroup paid $2.65 billion pre-tax, or $1.64 billion after-tax, to settle a lawsuit concerning its role in selling stocks and bonds for WorldCom, the second largest telecommunications company in the world, which collapsed after an accounting scandal.

On February 5, 2002, Citigroup was sued for violating federal securities laws and misleading investors by issuing false information about Global Crossing's revenues and financial performance. In 2005, Citigroup paid $75 million (~$119 million in 2025) to settle the lawsuit. Citigroup was accused of issuing exaggerated research reports and not disclosing conflicts of interest.

In 2005, Citigroup paid $2 billion (~$3.16 billion in 2025) to settle a lawsuit filed by investors in Enron. In 2008, Citi also agreed to pay $1.66 billion (~$2.43 billion in 2025) to Enron creditors.

On November 8, 2007, Citigroup was sued for financial misrepresentations and omissions of what amounted to more than two years of income and an entire line of business. In 2012, the company paid $590 million (~$817 million in 2025) to settle the case.

== Senior leadership ==
- Chairman: Jane Fraser (since October 2025)
- Chief executive officer: Jane Fraser (since March 2021)

=== List of former chairmen ===
This list only contains chairmen since the formation of Citigroup in 1998; for a full list of chairmen including Citigroup's predecessors, please see List of chairmen of Citigroup.

1. John Reed and Sandy Weill (1998–2000)
2. Sandy Weill (2000–2006)
3. Charles Prince (2006–2007)
4. Sir Win Bischoff (2007–2009)
5. Dick Parsons (2009–2012)
6. Michael O'Neill (2012–2019)
7. John Dugan (2019–2025)

=== List of former chief executives ===
This list only contains chief executives since the formation of Citigroup in 1998.

1. Sandy Weill (1998–2003)
2. Charles Prince (2003–2007)
3. Vikram Pandit (2007–2012)
4. Michael Corbat (2012–2021)

== Financial data ==
Year	2005	2006	2007	2008	2009	2010	2011	2012	2013	2014	2015	2016	2017	2018	2019	2020	2021	2022	2023	2024
Revenue	80.077	86.327	77.300	51.599	80.285	85.749	77.261	69.190	76.419	76.882	77.277	70.797	72.444	72.854	75.067	75.501	71.884	75.338	78.462	81.139
Net income	24.589	21.538	3.617	(27.684)	(1.606)	10.602	11.215	7.541	13.673	7.313	17.242	14.912	(6.798)	18.045	19.401	11.047	21.952	14.845	9.228	12.682
Assets	1,494	1,884	2,187	1,938	1,856	1,914	1,874	1,865	1,880	1,843	1,823	1,809	1,875	1,917	1,951	2,260	2,291	2,416	2,412	2,353
Headcount	296	327	375	323	265	260	266	259	251	241	231	219	209	204	210	210	223	240	239	229

Note: Financial data in billions of US dollars and employee data in thousands. The data is sourced from the company's SEC Form 10-K from 2005 to 2024.

== Ownership ==
Citigroup is mainly owned by institutional investors, who own around 30% of shares. The 11 largest shareholders of Citigroup in December 2023 were:

- The Vanguard Group (8.71%)
- BlackRock (8.68%)
- State Street Corporation (4.34%)
- Berkshire Hathaway (2.89%)
- Kingdom Holding Company (2.2%)
- Geode Capital Management (1.95%)
- Morgan Stanley (1.49%)
- BNY Mellon (1.32%)
- Fisher Investments (1.30%)
- Massachusetts Financial Services (1.14%)
- Northern Trust (1.01%)

== Criticism ==
=== Alleged money laundering by Raul Salinas, 1998 ===
In 1998, the General Accounting Office issued a report critical of Citibank's handling of funds received from Raul Salinas de Gortari, brother of Carlos Salinas, the former president of Mexico. The report, titled "Raul Salinas, Citibank and Alleged Money Laundering", indicated that Citibank facilitated the transfer of millions of dollars through complex financial transactions that hid the funds' paper trail. The report indicated that Citibank took on Salinas as a client without making a thorough inquiry as to how he made his fortune, an omission that a Citibank official called a violation of the bank's "know your customer" policy.

=== 2001–2009 ===
==== Conflicts of interest on investment research ====
In December 2002, Citigroup paid fines totaling $400 million (~$683 million in 2025), to states and the federal government as part of a settlement involving charges that ten banks, including Citigroup, deceived investors with biased research. The total settlement with the ten banks was $1.4 billion. The settlement required that the banks separate investment banking from research, and ban any allocation of IPO shares.

==== Citigroup proprietary government bond trading scandal of 2004 ====
Citigroup was criticized for disrupting the European bond market by rapidly selling €11 billion worth of bonds on August 2, 2004, on the MTS Group trading platform, driving down the price and then buying it back at cheaper prices.

==== Plutonomy report ====
A leaked 2005 plutonomy report prepared by Citi global strategists for its investor clients documented the imbalance of wealth between the top 1% and the bottom 60% of Anglo-American (viz. United States, United Kingdom, and Canada) households. Six drivers and other economic measurements, such as income and savings rates were also studied and included, in what was described as "an ongoing [bio-]technological revolution; capitalist-friendly governments and tax regimes" both powered by and consumed by the wealthy; the middle class was not its focus.

==== Terra Securities scandal ====
In November 2007, it became public that Citigroup was heavily involved in the Terra Securities scandal.

==== Allegations of theft from customer accounts ====
In August 2008, Citigroup agreed to pay nearly $18 million in refunds and fines to settle accusations by California Attorney General Jerry Brown that it wrongly took funds from the accounts of credit card customers. Citigroup paid $14 million of restitution to roughly 53,000 customers nationwide. A three-year investigation found that Citigroup from 1992 to 2003 used an improper computerized "sweep" feature to move positive balances from card accounts into the bank's general fund, without telling cardholders. Brown said that Citigroup "knowingly stole from its customers, mostly poor people and the recently deceased when it designed and implemented the sweeps ... When a whistleblower uncovered the scam and brought it to his superiors [in 2001], they buried the information and continued the illegal practice."

=== 2010–2019 ===
==== Shareholder rejection of executive compensation plan ====
At Citi's 2012 annual shareholders' meeting on April 17, Citi's executive compensation package was rejected, with approximately 55% of the votes being against approval. One of the largest and most activist of the shareholders voting no, the California Public Employees' Retirement System, stated Citi "has not anchored rewards to performance".

==== Accusations of futures market manipulation ====
In January 2017, bank regulators fined Citigroup $25 million on account of five traders from the bank having manipulated U.S. Treasury futures more than 2,500 times between July 2011 and December 2012. Citigroup was criticized for failing to adequately supervise its traders and for not having systems in place to detect spoofing, which involves entering fake orders designed to fool others into thinking prices are poised to rise or fall.

==== Dark money laundering ====
The bank has also been accused of failing to control the flow of dark money through its accounts. In 2017, prosecutors claimed drug smugglers were using Citigroup's Banamex USA unit to sneak dirty money into the United States from Mexico. The company agreed to pay more than $97 million to settle the allegations. In 2018, the O.C.C again indicted Citi for shortcomings in its anti-money laundering policies, Citi was required to pay $70M (~$88.3 million in 2025).

==== Criminal cartel charges in Australia ====
On June 1, 2018, the Australian Competition and Consumer Commission (ACCC) announced that criminal cartel charges were expected to be laid by the Commonwealth Director of Public Prosecutions (CDPP) against ANZ Bank, its Group Treasurer Rick Moscati, along with Deutsche Bank, Citigroup and a number of individuals. Charges were dropped by the CDPP on 11 Feb 2022.

=== 2020s ===
==== Failure to establish effective risk management ====
In 2020, Citigroup agreed to pay $400 million (~$490 million in 2025) to federal regulators over long-standing concerns regarding Citigroup's failure to establish effective risk management. The Federal Reserve and the Office of the Comptroller of the Currency said that Citi had engaged in "unsafe and unsound banking practices". According to them, Citi had failed to correct problems that had been known for years.

==== Anti-Armenian discrimination ====
In 2023, the Consumer Financial Protection Bureau (CFPB) ordered Citigroup to pay $24.5 million in fines and $1.4 million in restitution to Armenian Americans, alleging that the bank had illegally discriminated against members of the ethnic group and had unjustly denied them credit cards for which they had applied in a period beginning in 2015 and ending in 2021. According to the CFPB, Citigroup employees used the presence of -ian or -yan in applicant surnames as an indicator that a customer should undergo enhanced screening processes, while also deciding to avoid making mention of this screening method in emails. (The suffixes -ian and -yan are frequently found in Armenian surnames.)

==== Money laundering ease ====
In June 2024, agents from the United States Drug Enforcement Administration, citing recent investigations into the Sinaloa Cartel, said money launderers continually found ways to take advantage of Citibank's lax controls and oversight policies.

== Communications ==
=== Lobbying ===
Between 1998 and 2014, Citigroup spent nearly $100 million lobbying the federal government. As of 2008, Citigroup was the 16th largest political campaign contributor in the US, out of all organizations, according to OpenSecrets. From 1989 to 2006, members of the firm donated over $23,033,490, 49% of which went to Democrats and 51% of which went to Republicans. Matthew Vadum, a senior editor at the conservative Capital Research Center, acknowledged these figures, but pointed out that Citigroup had been "a longtime donor to left-wing pressure groups", and referred to a Capital Research Center Foundation Watch 2006 study of Fortune 100 foundation giving, where Citigroup's foundation gave "20 times more money to groups on the left than to groups on the right" during the tax year 2003.

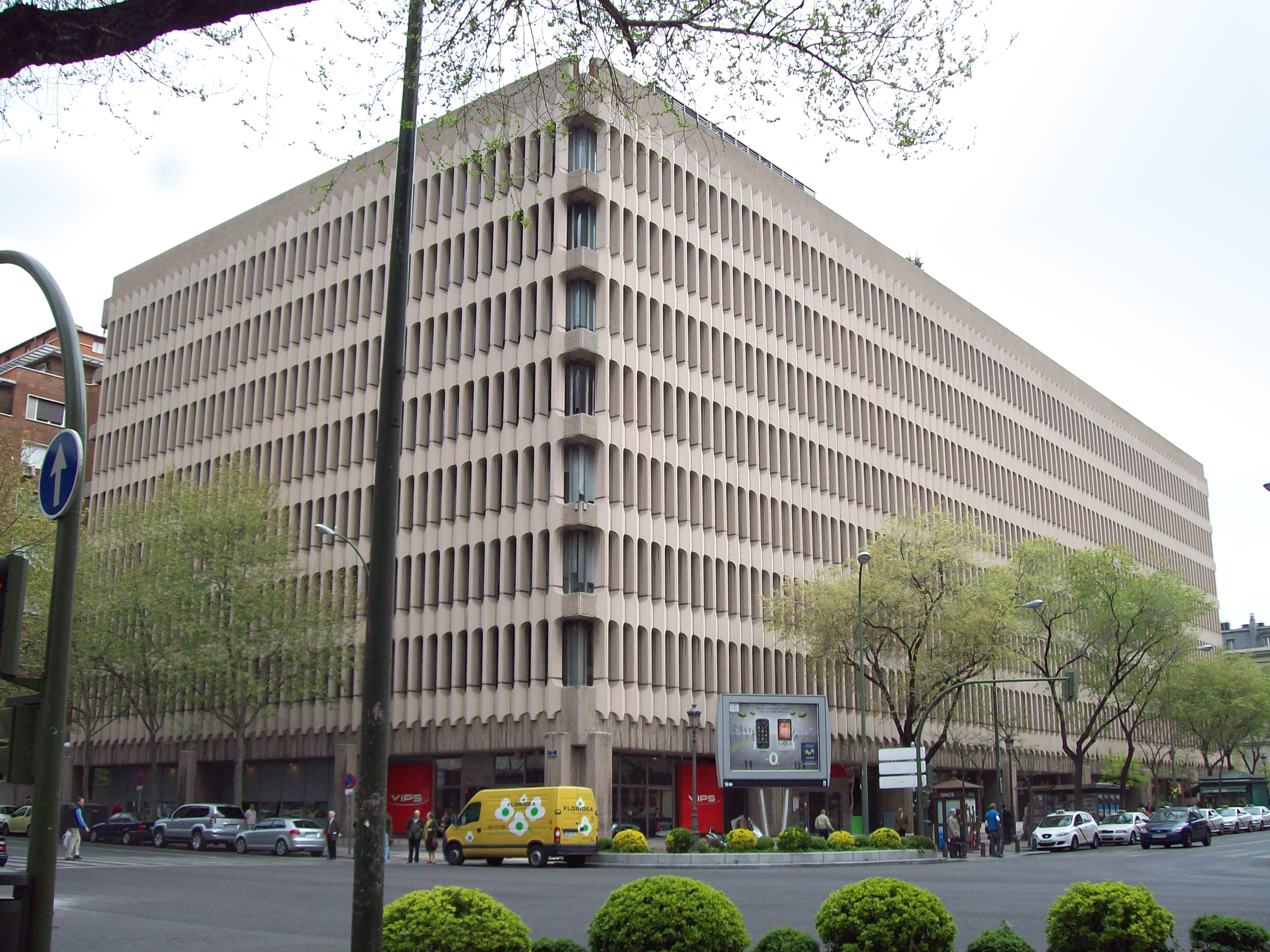
View of the Madrid office. Citi has had a presence in Spain for more than a century, and serves as the headquarters of Southern Europe.

In 2014, Citigroup's PAC contributed $804,000 (~$1.08 million in 2025) to campaigns of various members of Congress, i.e. 162 members of the House, including 72 Democrats, where donations averaged about $5,000 per candidate. Of the 57 Democrats supporting the 2015 Spending bill, 34 had received campaign cash from Citigroup's PAC at some point since 2010. Citigroup's 2014 donations favored Republicans only slightly. The bank's PAC had been nearly as generous to Democrats as Republicans – $30,000 to the Democratic Congressional Campaign Committee (the maximum) and $10,000 to the 'New Democrat Coalition', a group of moderate Democrats most of whom voted for the 2015 spending package. Citibank's PAC made donations to both the campaigns and the leadership PACs of many top Democrats who voted for the 2015 spending bill, including Steny Hoyer (Md.) House Democratic Whip and Representatives Jim Himes (D-Conn.) and Debbie Wasserman Schultz (D-Florida.).

=== Public and governmental relations ===
In 2009, former chairman Richard Parsons hired long-time Washington, D.C. lobbyist Richard F. Hohlt to advise him and the company about relations with the U.S. government, though not to lobby for the company. While some speculated anonymously that the Federal Deposit Insurance Corporation (FDIC) would have been a particular focus of Hohlt's attention, Hohlt said he'd had no contact with the government insurance corporation. Some former regulators found room to criticize Hohlt's involvement with Citigroup, because of his earlier involvement with the financial services industry during the savings and loan crisis of the 1980s. Hohlt responded that though mistakes were made in the earlier episode he'd never been investigated by any government agency and his experience gave him a reason to be back in the "operating room" as parties address the more recent crisis.

In 2010, the company named Edward Skyler, formerly in New York City government and at Bloomberg L.P., to its senior public and governmental relations position. Before Skyler was named and before he began his job search, the company reportedly held discussions with three other individuals to fill the position: NY Deputy Mayor Kevin Sheekey, Mayor Michael Bloomberg's "political guru ... [who] spearheaded ... his short-lived flirtation with a presidential run ..., who will soon leave City Hall for a position at the mayor's company, Bloomberg L.P. ... After Mr. Bloomberg's improbable victory in the 2001 mayor's race, both Mr. Skyler and Mr. Sheekey followed him from his company to City Hall. Since then, they have been a part of an enormously influential coterie of advisers"; Howard Wolfson, the former communications director for Hillary Clinton's presidential campaign and Mr. Bloomberg's re-election bid; and Gary Ginsberg, now at Time Warner and formerly at News Corporation.

On March 21, 2018, it was announced that Citigroup changed its policy to forbid its business customers from performing certain firearm-related transactions. The policy doesn't affect clients who offer credit cards backed by Citigroup or borrow money, use banking services, or raise capital through the company.

== Notable staff ==
=== Current ===
- Jane Fraser, appointed CEO in March 2021 after holding other positions with the company. She was included on Fortune's "Most Powerful Women in Business" list in 2014, 2015 and 2021.
- Mark Mason. serving since 2019 as the chief financial officer (CFO) of Citigroup.
- Edward Skyler. In 2010, he was named executive vice president, Global Public Affairs at Citigroup.
- Edward L. Morse has been the global head of commodities research since 2011.
- Catherine L. Mann has been the chief economist since 2018.
- Manuel Falcó has been the global head of investment banking since 2018

=== Former ===
- Sanford I. Weill – was CEO from 1998 until October 1, 2003. He was also one of the 25 people that Time magazine blamed for the financial crisis.
- Robert Rubin – was an advisor and from 1999 till 2009 served as a board member. Rubin received $126 million compensation from Citigroup between 1999 and 2009.
- Charles Prince – was CEO from 2003 to November 2007. Prince was famously quoted as saying Citigroup was "still dancing" just as the financial crisis hit.
- Vikram Pandit – was CEO from December 2007 to October 2012.
- Willem Buiter – was the chief economist from 2010 until 2018.
- Michael Corbat – was CEO from October 2012 to February 2021.
- Karen Peetz – was Chief Administrative Officer from 2020 to 2023.

== See also ==
- Big Four banks
