= Charles Prince =

American corporate executive and lawyer (born 1950)

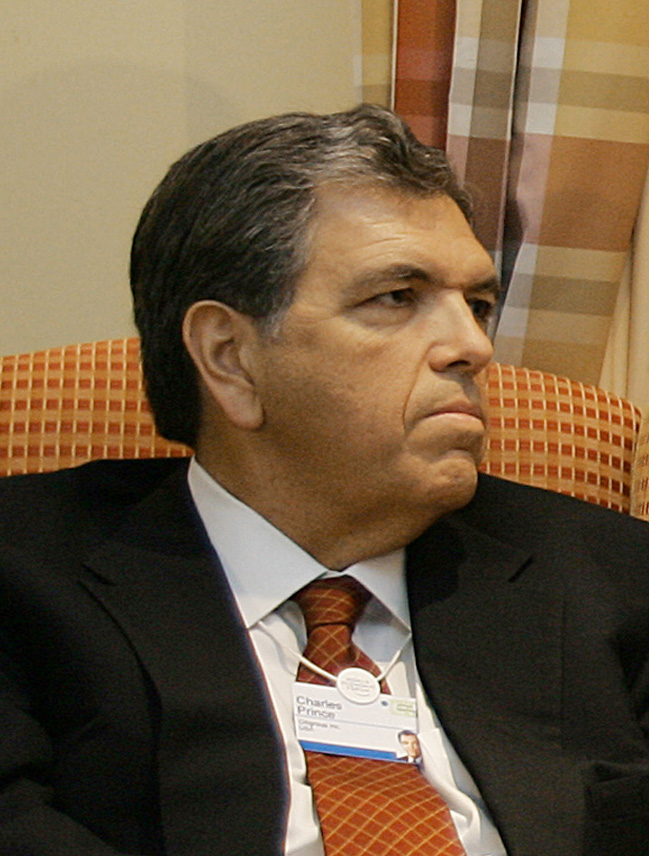
- Born: Charles Owen Prince III; January 13, 1950 (age 76); Lynwood, California, U.S.
- Education: University of Southern California (BA, MA, JD); Georgetown University (LLM)
- Occupations: Corporate Executive, Lawyer
- Spouse: Margaret L. Wolff

Charles Owen ("Chuck") Prince III (born January 13, 1950) is an American corporate executive, banker and lawyer. He is a former chairman of the board of directors and chief executive officer of Citigroup. He succeeded Sanford I. ("Sandy") Weill (born 1933), as the chief executive of the financial firm in 2002–2003, and succeeded him also four years later as the subsequent chairman of the board of directors in 2006. On November 4, 2007, he himself retired from both his chairman and chief executive officer duties due to an unexpectedly poor third quarter revenues / profits performance, mainly due to CDO and MBS related losses, while still receiving a $38 million pay package.

== Early life and education ==
Charles Owen Prince III was born in Lynwood, California on 13 January 1950 to Charles Owen Prince II and Mary Doyle. Prince went to the University of Southern California and its USC Marshall School of Business in Los Angeles, California, for his Bachelor of Arts, Master of Arts, and Juris Doctor (Doctor of Law) academic degrees. He continued his education, going on to receive a Master of Laws degree from Georgetown University Law Center of Georgetown University, in the Georgetown section of Washington, D.C.

== Career ==
Prince started his career as an attorney with the famous longtime United States Steel Corporation in 1975. Four years later in 1979, he joined the old Commercial Credit Company, a predecessor to Citigroup that Sanford I. ("Sandy") Weill (born 1933), took over in 1986. He was promoted in 1996 to executive vice president of the firm, which at this point, was known as the Travelers Group. In 2000, shortly following the 1998 merger of the Travelers Group and Citicorp, Prince was named chief administrative officer of the newly created firm, Citigroup. He was subsequently promoted to chief operating officer (COO) in 2001, to chairman and chief executive of Citi Markets and Banking in 2002, and finally to chairman and chief executive officer.

=== Credit crisis ===
On Sunday, November 4, 2007, Prince resigned from his post as CEO of Citigroup due to the failing mortgage industry. He was replaced by Vikram Pandit (born 1957), as the next CEO of Citigroup, and by former U.S. Secretary of the Treasury in the 42nd President Bill Clinton administration of Robert Rubin (born 1938, served as Treasury Secretary 1993-2001), as its new chairman of the board of directors.

Prince left with an exit bonus valued at $12.5 million, in addition to the $68 million he received in stock and options he had accumulated during his career, together with a $1.7 million pension, an office, with car and driver for up to five years. During his tenure, the market value of Citigroup dropped by $64 billion. He is still a consultant with Citigroup.

In July 2007, Prince famously said about Citigroup's continued commitment to leveraged buy-out deals, despite fears of reduced liquidity because of the occurring sub-prime meltdown: "As long as the music is playing, you've got to get up and dance."

In 2008, Fortune named Charles Prince as one of eight economic leaders "who didn't [see] the crisis coming", noting his overly optimistic statements in July 2007. In January 2009, Guardian city editor Julia Finch identified him as one of twenty-five people who were at the heart of the financial meltdown.

== Personal life ==
Prince is currently married to Margaret L. Wolff. The couple was wed on September 20, 2003, at The Pierre Hotel in New York City. Semi-retired Judge Robert W. Sweet presided over the ceremonies.

== Affiliations ==
Prince serves in the influential trade group the Financial Services Forum, as well as a member of the Council of Foreign Relations, the Business Roundtable, and several other organizations. Along with his directorship on the Citigroup board, Prince has served as a member of Johnson & Johnson's board since February 13, 2006.

He also serves as a trustee for several education institutions including the Weill Medical College (of Cornell University, in Ithaca, New York), but located at Manhattan of New York City, the Teachers College of Columbia University, and The Juilliard School (of music).

Prince formerly was a Senior Counselor to the Albright Stonebridge Group.

== See also ==
- Robert Rubin
- Gary Crittenden
- Subprime mortgage crisis

Business positions
Preceded by Sanford I. Weill	Citigroup CEO; 2003–2007	Succeeded by Win Bischoff
Preceded by Sanford I. Weill	Chairman of Citigroup; 2006–2007	Succeeded by Robert Rubin
