= Richard F. Hohlt =

American lobbyist and government adviser

Richard F. Hohlt was a member of the American Air Force Reserves in 1970

== Life and early career ==
Hohlt was born and raised in Indianapolis, Indiana, graduating from North Central High School in 1966, and from Millikin University in 1970 with a BS in accounting.

He joined the Air Force Reserves in 1970 and was honorably discharged in 1976. While in the Reserves, he worked as an internal auditor at LS Ayers department stores and was a project leader for the cost accounting and computerization of the Unified City-County government for the city of Indianapolis. In 1993 in Nantucket, Mass., Hohlt married Deborah Lee Messick, also a lobbyist and federal relations consultant. He has one son, Luke Frederick Hohlt.

== Political career ==
In 1974, Hohlt became a full-time aide to the Republican Mayor of Indianapolis, Richard G. Lugar during his 1974 campaign for the U.S. Senate. He became the Administrative Assistant to Mayor Lugar in 1975 and served as the Deputy Director of the Lugar for Senate Committee in 1976.

When Lugar was elected, Hohlt moved with the Senator to Capitol Hill. He served on Lugar's Washington staff and then joined the United States League of Savings Institutions, a national financial services industry trade association, as Senior Vice President for Government Relations, representing the industry's legislative and regulatory interests for nine years.

== Government Advisor ==
Hohlt served as a key advisor to Republicans in Congress, the Administration, presidential campaigns, inaugurals, and transition teams for Presidents Ronald Reagan, George H. W. Bush, and George W. Bush. President Ronald Reagan appointed him to the Board of Directors of the Overseas Private Investment Corporation (OPIC) (1985–1988), the Peace Corps Advisory Council (1983–1984), and President George H.W. Bush appointed him to the board of directors of the Student Loan Marketing Association (Sallie Mae) (1990–1994). He also served as the senior advisor to the co-chairman of President George W. Bush's Social Security Commission.

He was instrumental in the passage of major legislation in the fields of telecommunications, terrorism insurance, energy and highway bills, appropriations bills, bankruptcy reform, class action, and tax legislation.

== See also ==
- revolving door (politics)
