= Robert Rubin =

American banking executive, lawyer and government official (born 1938)

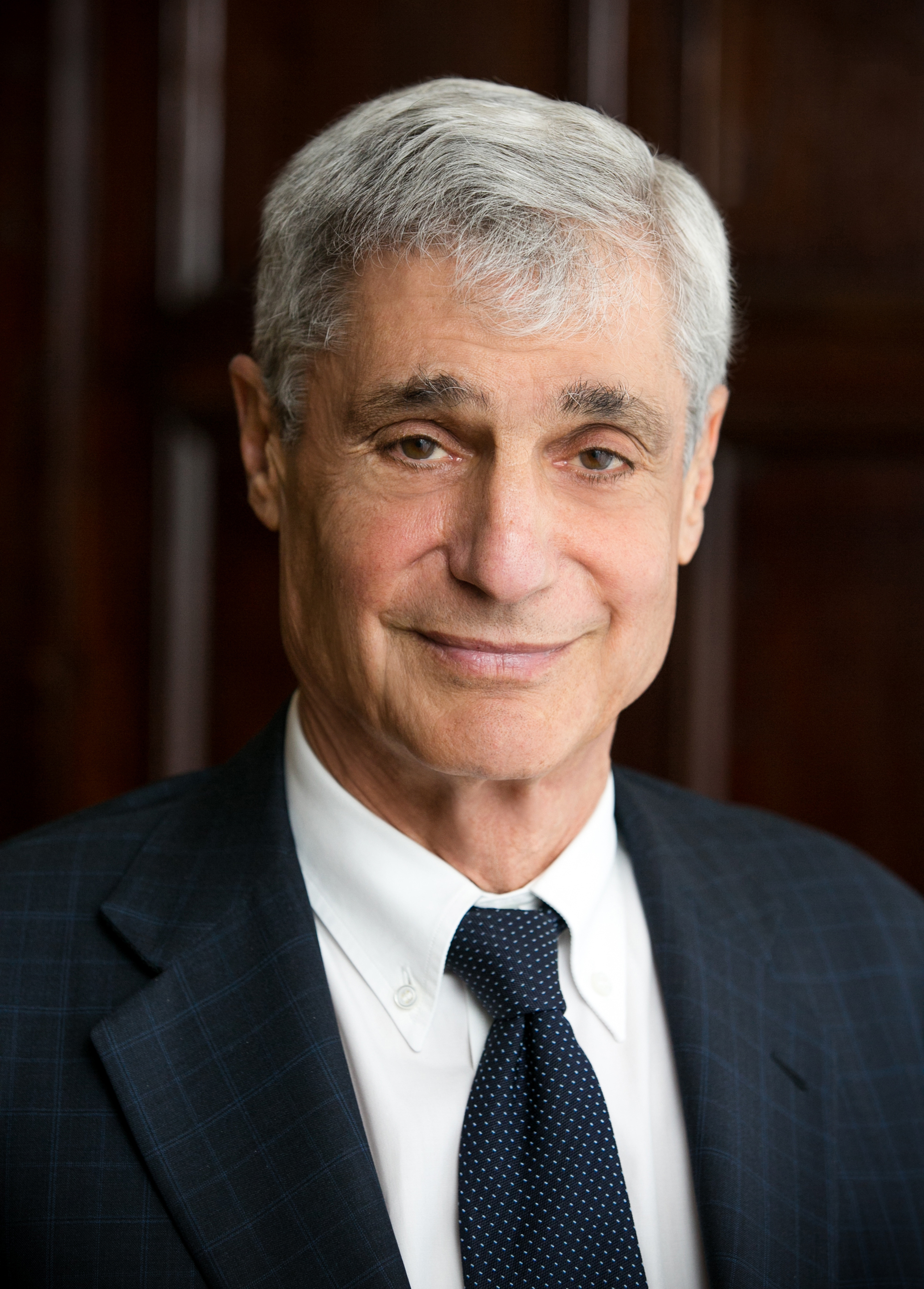
- Rubin in 2014

70th United States Secretary of the Treasury
- In office January 11, 1995 – July 2, 1999
- President: Bill Clinton
- Deputy: Frank N. Newman; Larry Summers
- Preceded by: Lloyd Bentsen
- Succeeded by: Larry Summers

Director of the National Economic Council
- In office January 25, 1993 – January 11, 1995
- President: Bill Clinton
- Preceded by: Position established
- Succeeded by: Laura Tyson

Personal details
- Born: Robert Edward Rubin; August 29, 1938 (age 88) New York City, New York, U.S.
- Party: Democratic
- Spouse: Judith Oxenberg
- Children: 2
- Education: Harvard University (BA); London School of Economics (attended); Yale University (LLB)
- Website: Official website

Robert Edward Rubin (born August 29, 1938) is an American retired banking executive, lawyer, and former government official. He served as the 70th United States secretary of the treasury during the Clinton administration. Before his government service, he spent 26 years at Goldman Sachs, eventually serving as a member of the board and co-chairman from 1990 to 1992.

Rubin is credited as a force behind Clinton-era economic prosperity, including the 1993 Deficit Reduction Act and Balanced Budget Act of 1997. Critics of Rubin have since argued that the bank-friendly policies he supported contributed to the 2008 financial crisis. As of 2025, Rubin is active in several organizations, including as a co-founder of the Hamilton Project, as co-chair emeritus of the Council on Foreign Relations, and as a senior counselor at Centerview Partners.

== Early life ==
Rubin was born on August 29, 1938, in New York City to Jewish parents Sylvia (née Seiderman) and Alexander Rubin. He moved to Miami Beach, Florida, at an early age and graduated from Miami Beach Senior High School. In 1960, Rubin graduated with a Bachelor of Arts, summa cum laude, in economics from Harvard College. He then attended Harvard Law School for three days before leaving to travel the world. He later attended the London School of Economics and received an LL.B. from Yale Law School in 1964.

== Early career ==
Rubin was an attorney at the firm of Cleary, Gottlieb, Steen & Hamilton in New York City from 1964 to 1966 before joining Goldman Sachs in 1966 as an associate in the risk arbitrage department. He later served as co-chief operating officer, and became co-senior partner and co-chairman in 1990.

Rubin served as New York finance chairman for the Walter Mondale presidential campaign in 1984 and headed the host committee for the 1992 Democratic National Convention in New York. He served on the board of directors of the New York Stock Exchange, the U.S. Securities and Exchange Commission Market Oversight and Financial Services Advisory Committee, and advisory panels for New York Gov. Mario Cuomo and Mayor David Dinkins.

== Clinton administration ==
From January 25, 1993, to January 10, 1995, Rubin served in the White House as Assistant to the President for Economic Policy. In that capacity, he directed the National Economic Council, which Bill Clinton created after winning the presidency. The National Economic Council, or NEC, enabled the White House to coordinate closely the workings of the Cabinet departments and agencies on policies ranging from budget and tax to international trade and alleviating poverty. The NEC coordinated policy recommendations going into the President's office, and monitored implementation of the decisions that came out. Robert S. Strauss credited Rubin with making the system work. In 1994, Strauss said, "He's surely the only man or woman in America that I know who could make the NEC succeed ... Anyone else would have been a disruptive force, and the council wouldn't have worked."

=== 1993 Deficit Reduction Act ===
Rubin encouraged Clinton to focus on deficit reduction and he was "one of the chief architects" of Clinton's 1993 Deficit Reduction Act plan. Supporters said the Act helped create the late 1990s budget surplus and strong economic growth, while opponents noted it raised taxes. As officials deliberated the deficit reduction plan, Rubin advocated for tax increases on those in the upper-income tax bracket. The Baltimore Sun said that the budget deal "was critical" and "convinced nervous bond traders that the new Democratic president was serious about the deficit, lowering long-term interest rates, spurring economic growth and, ultimately, helping to balance the budget."

=== Secretary of the Treasury ===
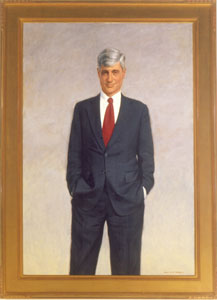
Robert Rubin official Treasury portrait, 1999

Clinton nominated Rubin as Treasury secretary in December 1994. On January 10, 1995, Rubin was sworn in as the 70th United States Secretary of the Treasury after the U.S. Senate confirmed him in a 99–0 vote. Rubin's tenure with the Clinton administration, especially as the head of Treasury, was marked by economic prosperity in the U.S. Rubin is credited as one of the main individuals behind U.S. economic growth, creating near full-employment and bullish stock markets while avoiding inflation. From the time he joined the White House until he announced his resignation from Treasury in 1999, U.S. unemployment fell from 6.9 percent to 4.3 percent; the U.S. budget went from a $255 billion deficit to a $70 billion surplus, and inflation fell. Rubin was succeeded in early July 1999 as Treasury secretary by his deputy, Lawrence Summers.

According to CNN Money, Rubin was "one of the architects of the Clinton administration's economic policy, and is often credited—along with Federal Reserve Chairman Alan Greenspan—for the booming eight-year economic expansion, the second-longest in U.S. history". Senator Chuck Hagel (R-NE) called Rubin "an ideal public servant who put policy before politics." At the time of Rubin's resignation, Clinton called Rubin the "greatest secretary of the Treasury since Alexander Hamilton."

==== 1990s international crises ====
Upon being sworn into office as Treasury secretary in January 1995, Rubin was confronted with the Mexican peso crisis, which threatened to result in Mexico defaulting on its foreign obligations. President Bill Clinton, with the advice of Rubin and Greenspan, provided $20 billion in U.S. loan guarantees to the Mexican government through the Exchange Stabilization Fund. Mexico recovered and the U.S. Treasury made a $580 million profit as a result of the loan agreement.

In 1997 and 1998, Rubin, Greenspan, and Deputy Treasury Secretary Summers worked with the International Monetary Fund and others to promote U.S. policy in response to financial crises in Russian, Asian, and Latin American financial markets. On the cover of its February 15, 1999, edition, Time Magazine dubbed the three policymakers "The Committee to Save the World".

==== Balanced budget agreement ====
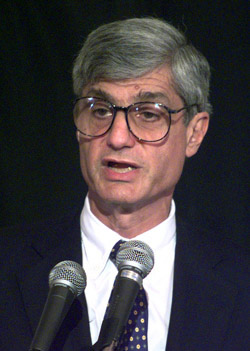
Rubin in 1999

Early in the Clinton administration, Rubin touted a balanced budget and a strong dollar as a way for the Fed to lower interest rates. He also argued that a balanced federal budget's broad benefits to society outweighed concerns that one group could benefit more than others. Rubin was the Clinton administration's chief negotiator with a Republican-controlled Congress on the balanced-budget deal. The Balanced Budget Act of 1997 has been referred to as the "capstone" of Rubin's tenure as Treasury secretary.

==== Regulation of derivatives ====
In 1998, Rubin and Federal Reserve chairman Alan Greenspan opposed giving the Commodity Futures Trading Commission (CFTC) oversight of over-the-counter credit derivatives when this was proposed by Brooksley Born, then head of the CFTC. Rubin and other senior officials recommended Congress relieve the CFTC of regulatory authority over derivatives in November 1999. Over-the-counter credit derivatives were eventually excluded from regulation by the CFTC by the Commodity Futures Modernization Act of 2000. According to a Frontline report, derivatives played a key role in the 2008 financial crisis.

Arthur Levitt Jr., a former chairman of the Securities and Exchange Commission, has said in explaining Rubin's strong opposition to the regulations proposed by Born that Greenspan and Rubin were "joined at the hip on this. They were certainly very fiercely opposed to this and persuaded me that this would cause chaos." However, in Rubin's autobiography, he notes that he believed derivatives could pose significant problems and that many people who used derivatives did not fully understand the risks they were taking. In 2008, The New York Times reported that the proposal in 1997 would not have improved oversight of derivatives. Rubin said the financial system "could benefit from better regulation of derivatives". However, he said "the politics would have made this impossible." Rubin said he had been concerned about derivatives' potential to create systemic risk since his time at Goldman Sachs.

In an interview on ABC's This Week program in April 2010, former President Clinton said Rubin was wrong in the advice he gave him not to regulate derivatives, which was by then seen as one of the underlying causes of the 2008 financial crisis. Clinton adviser Doug Band later said Clinton "inadvertently conflated an analysis he received on a specific derivatives proposal with then-Federal Reserve Chairman Alan Greenspan's arguments against any regulation of derivatives". He said Clinton still wished he had pursued legislation to regulate derivatives while confirming that he still believed he had received excellent advice on the economy and the financial system from Rubin and others during his presidency.

==== Urban policy ====
Rubin was a leading advocate for investment in distressed rural and urban communities in the Clinton administration, from his time with the NEC, leading the effort to expand the Community Reinvestment Act, to his time at Treasury, where he advocated for more community development financial institutions (CDFI) to invest in inner cities and increase the CDFI Fund. Addressing the needs of the urban poor was a top priority for Rubin during his tenure in the Clinton administration. Rubin also assisted with the Clinton administration's plan to increase empowerment and enterprise zones across the U.S. The initiative offered tax breaks for businesses investing in those zones.

==== Decline of the Glass-Steagall Act ====
As Treasury Secretary, Robert Rubin was on the record for stating that the Glass-Steagall Act was obsolete and outdated, and indeed its provisions had become less effective over time. However, it was not until the late 1990s that the Congress and the Clinton administration finally came round to repealing the act. This resulted in part from lobbying pressure exercised by Sanford I. Weill on Congress and the White House to repeal the Act, and so allow the mega-merger he had organized between Travelers Group and Citicorp in 1998 to stand. Rubin resigned from the Clinton administration in July 1999. In October 1999, Rubin joined the leadership at Citigroup. Glass–Steagall was eventually repealed by the Gramm–Leach–Bliley Act under Rubin's successor, Lawrence Summers, and was signed by Clinton in November 1999.

== Post-government career ==
=== Local Initiatives Support Corporation ===
Upon leaving the Clinton administration, Rubin joined the board of the Local Initiatives Support Corporation (LISC), the nation's leading community development support organization, as chairman. Reflecting on his decision to join an institution devoted to bringing economic activity to neglected areas of the country, the Chicago Tribune said the following in an editorial: "Even before he became Bill Clinton's treasury secretary, during his days as a high-powered Wall Street executive, Rubin was passionate about fostering business investment as the way to fight poverty in depressed city and rural areas. That made him somewhat unusual among Democrats, who generally emphasized government anti-poverty programs."

=== Citigroup ===
Rubin joined Citigroup in 1999 as chairman of the executive committee of the board. In 2001, Enron, a major client of Citigroup, faced a credit ratings downgrade as a result of the Enron scandal. Rubin called a ranking Treasury Department official, unsuccessfully seeking the Bush Administration's help in forestalling the downgrade. A subsequent staff investigation by the Senate Governmental Affairs committee cleared Rubin of having done anything illegal. Rubin later maintained that he had acted both as a Citigroup executive protecting his company's position and as a former Treasury official concerned about the impact that Enron's failure might have on the larger economy. Rubin rejected criticisms of a possible conflict of interest and has said that if faced with the same choice, he would do it again.

Rubin briefly became chairman of Citigroup's board of directors from November 2007 to December 2007. According to The New York Times, Rubin's role at Citigroup focused on meeting with clients and government and business leaders, bringing in business, and serving as a sounding board to bank leadership. As the Times reported in 2007, Rubin "has said publicly since he came to Citigroup in 1999 that he had no interest in running the bank". The Wall Street Journal reported Rubin joined Citigroup as a board member and as a participant "in strategic managerial and operational matters of the Company, but [...] no line responsibilities". The newspaper called this mix of oversight and management responsibilities "murky".

Following the 2008 financial crisis, critics argued Rubin increased risk-taking at Citigroup, thereby exposing the bank to greater losses, and that economic policies he promoted as Treasury secretary exacerbated the situation. According to The Wall Street Journal, Rubin has stated that "he wasn't alone in failing to foresee the severity of the crisis that would emerge". Other industry observers criticized the lack of clarity about Rubin's role within the bank. The federal government spent $45 billion to acquire a stake in Citigroup in 2008 through the Troubled Asset Relief Program. Citigroup repaid $20 billion of the bailout money in December 2009 and the Treasury sold its remaining stake one year later, for a total net profit of $12 billion.

In December 2008, investors filed a lawsuit contending that Citigroup executives, including Rubin, sold shares at inflated prices while concealing the firm's risks. Citigroup settled the lawsuit in 2012, paying $590 million to claimants and denying any wrongdoing as part of the settlement. Rubin resigned from Citigroup in 2009. Between 1999 and 2009, Rubin received total compensation, including employee stock options, of $126 million from Citigroup. His compensation was criticized, with writer Nassim Nicholas Taleb noting that Rubin "collected more than $120 million in compensation from Citibank in the decade preceding the banking crash of 2008. When the bank, literally insolvent, was rescued by the taxpayer, he didn't write any check—he invoked uncertainty as an excuse." In 2010, the Financial Crisis Inquiry Commission interviewed Rubin as part of their investigation into the causes of the 2008 financial crisis and concluded that Rubin "may have violated the laws of the United States in relation to the financial crisis" related to his role at Citigroup. The commission unanimously voted to refer him to the United States Department of Justice for further investigation; however, the DOJ did not pursue any further investigation or actions against Rubin.

=== Other work ===
On July 1, 2002, Rubin became a member of Harvard Corporation, the executive governing board of Harvard University. He served as a member of the Harvard Corporation board until June 2014, and as of 2018, served on its finance committee. As of 2024, Rubin is involved in the Hamilton Project, an economic policy think tank he co-founded in 2006. He is co-chairman emeritus of the Council on Foreign Relations. He serves as a trustee of Mount Sinai Health System and as co-chair of the advisory board of the Peter G. Peterson Foundation. Additionally, Rubin serves as a senior counselor at Centerview Partners, an investment banking advisory firm based in New York City.

Rubin was a member of the Africa Progress Panel (APP), a group of ten individuals who advocated for equitable and sustainable development in Africa by publishing seven annual reports between 2009 and 2015. Rubin also served on the Global Citizenship Commission, convened by former British Prime Minister Gordon Brown, which reexamined and proposed an update to the United Nations' 1948 Universal Declaration on Human Rights.

=== Books ===
Rubin's memoir, In an Uncertain World: Tough Choices from Wall Street to Washington, co-written by Jacob Weisberg, was a New York Times bestseller as well as one of Business Week's ten best business books of 2003. Rubin's second book, The Yellow Pad: Making Better Decisions in an Uncertain World, was published in May 2023. In it, he writes about his approach to "probabilistic thinking", or understanding that every decision carries risk. The book was named one of the "Best Books of 2023" by Bloomberg News.

== Policy views ==
=== Economic policies ===
Rubin has advocated for fiscal discipline and public investment, and worked to turn the federal budget deficit to a surplus while Treasury Secretary. He has advocated against high budget deficits and has been credited with developing the strong dollar policy that has been a cornerstone of U.S. economic policy since his tenure at Treasury.

Rubin has been described as a centrist, pro-business, "pro-growth Democrat" by The New York Times. The Chicago Tribune and Associated Press have stated that Rubin's policies as Treasury Secretary helped drive American economic growth in the 1990s. However, his policies have also been criticized by some Republicans for not cutting taxes enough, while some Democrats have said that Rubin's policies contributed to the 2008 financial crisis. Rubin has supported progressive tax measures and expanding earned income tax credits to benefit low- and middle-income Americans. He has also opposed tax cuts that disproportionately benefit high earners, including those enacted during the administrations of George W. Bush and Donald Trump. During the Biden administration, Rubin joined with four former Treasury secretaries to support the Inflation Reduction Act and supported a permanent refundable child tax credit with former Treasury Secretary Jacob Lew.

In April 2016, Rubin was one of eight former Treasury secretaries who called on the United Kingdom to remain a member of the European Union ahead of the June 2016 Referendum.

=== Climate change policies ===
Among Rubin's policy interests is climate change. In 2014, Rubin served as a member of the U.S. Climate Risk Committee, which oversaw the development of an analysis of the economic risks of climate change in the United States. In an address at the Climate Leadership Conference on March 4, 2015, Rubin spoke about the economic effects of climate change and the costs of inaction. Calling climate change "the existential threat of our age", he called for the adoption of three proposals—revising estimates of the gross domestic product to reflect climate change externalities, disclosure to investors by companies of the costs of carbon they emit that they might be required to absorb, and including in the U.S. government's fiscal projections the future costs of dealing with climate change—to help catalyze a more active response to climate change risks. He first outlined these proposals in a Washington Post op-ed column titled "How Ignoring Climate Change Could Sink the U.S. Economy."

In 2016, former Treasury secretaries Rubin, Henry Paulson, and George Shultz, members of the climate research group the Risky Business Project, penned a letter to the United States Securities and Exchange Commission, urging regulators to manage financial disclosures regarding climate change.

== Personal life ==
Rubin and his wife, Judith O. Rubin, have two grown sons together, James Rubin (not to be confused with James Phillip Rubin), and Philip Rubin. The Rubins were long time members of Temple Beth Sholom on Miami Beach. His daughter-in-law is author Gretchen Rubin.

== See also ==
- Rubinomics
- Bob Rubin Trade
- List of Harvard University politicians
- List of Jewish United States Cabinet members

== Sources ==
- The White House - Office of the Press Secretary

Business positions
| Preceded by John Weinberg | Chair and Chief Executive Officer of Goldman Sachs; 1990–1992 | Succeeded by Stephen Friedman |
| Preceded by Charles Prince | Chair of Citigroup; Acting; 2007 | Succeeded by Win Bischoff |
Political offices
| New office | Director of the National Economic Council; 1993–1995 | Succeeded by Laura Tyson |
| Preceded by Lloyd Bentsen | United States Secretary of the Treasury; 1995–1999 | Succeeded by Larry Summers |
U.S. order of precedence (ceremonial)
| Preceded by William J. Perry as Former U.S. Cabinet Member | Order of precedence of the United States as Former U.S. Cabinet Member | Succeeded by Dan Glickman as Former U.S. Cabinet Member |
