= Citibank =

American banking company

Citibank, N.A.
- Type: Subsidiary
- Industry: Financial services
- Founded: June 16, 1812; 214 years ago (as City Bank of New York)
- Founder: Samuel Osgood
- Headquarters: New York City, U.S.
- Key people: Barbara Desoer (chairwoman); Sunil Garg (CEO)
- Products: Credit cards; Mortgages; Personal loans; Commercial banking; Lines of credit
- Parent: Citigroup
- Website: citi.com

Citibank, N.A. (stylized as citibank; "N.A." stands for "National Association") is the primary U.S. banking subsidiary of Citigroup, a financial services multinational corporation. Citibank was founded in 1812 as City Bank of New York, and later became First National City Bank of New York. The bank has branches in 19 countries. The U.S. branches are concentrated in six metropolitan areas: New York City, Chicago, Los Angeles, San Francisco, Washington, D.C., and Miami. Citibank used to maintain a longtime presence in the Boston metropolitan area, but withdrew from their seventh major market in 2016.

As of 2023, Citibank is the third-largest bank in the United States in terms of assets.

== History ==
=== Founding ===
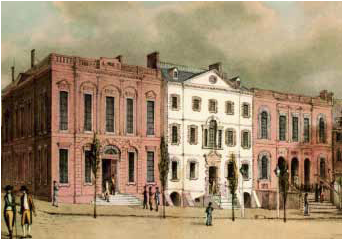
A late 18th century view of the northeast corner of William and Wall streets; the house to the far right became City Bank of New York's first home at 38 Wall Street, later renumbered as 52.

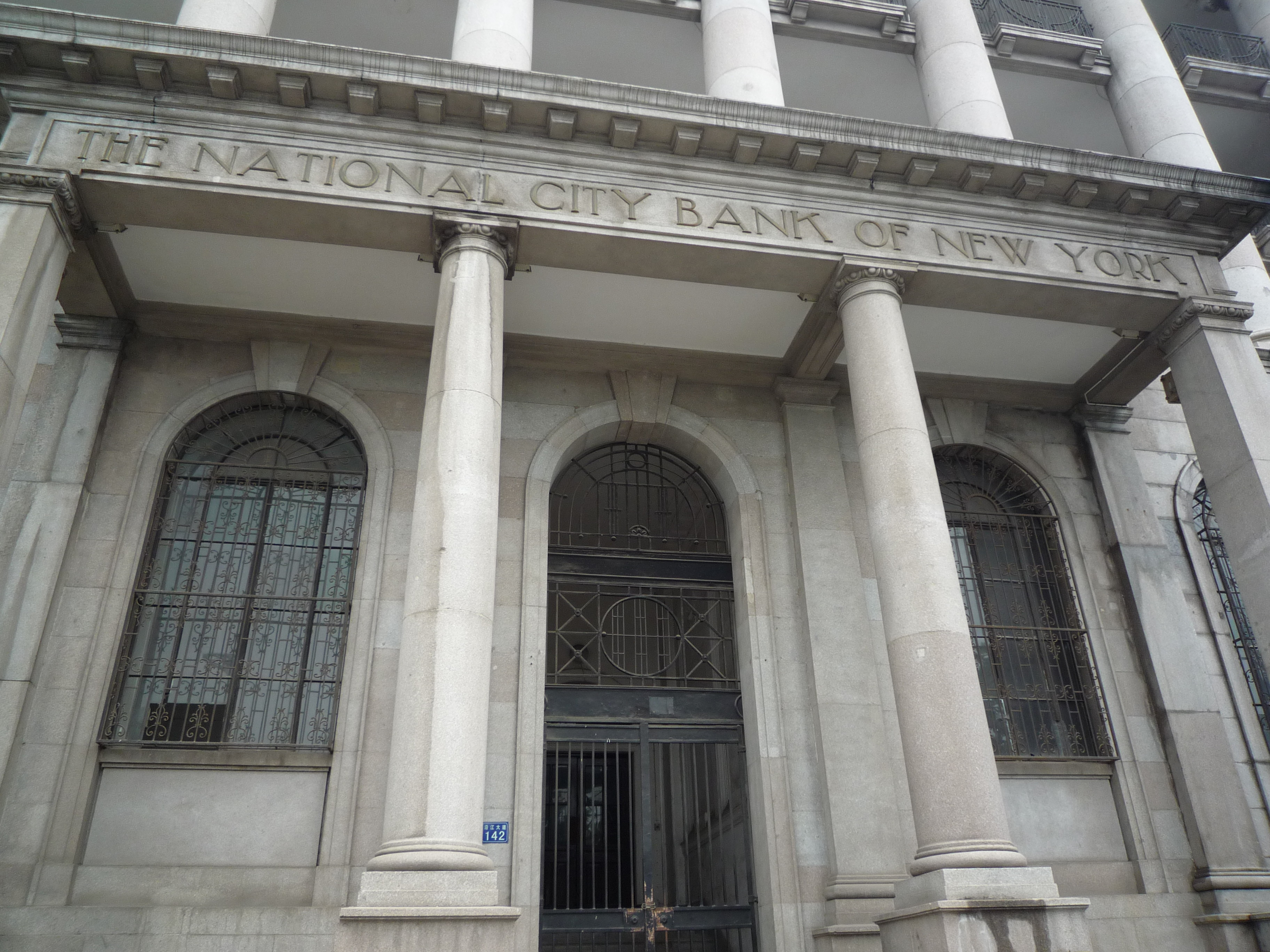
Former Hankou offices of National City Bank in Wuhan, China

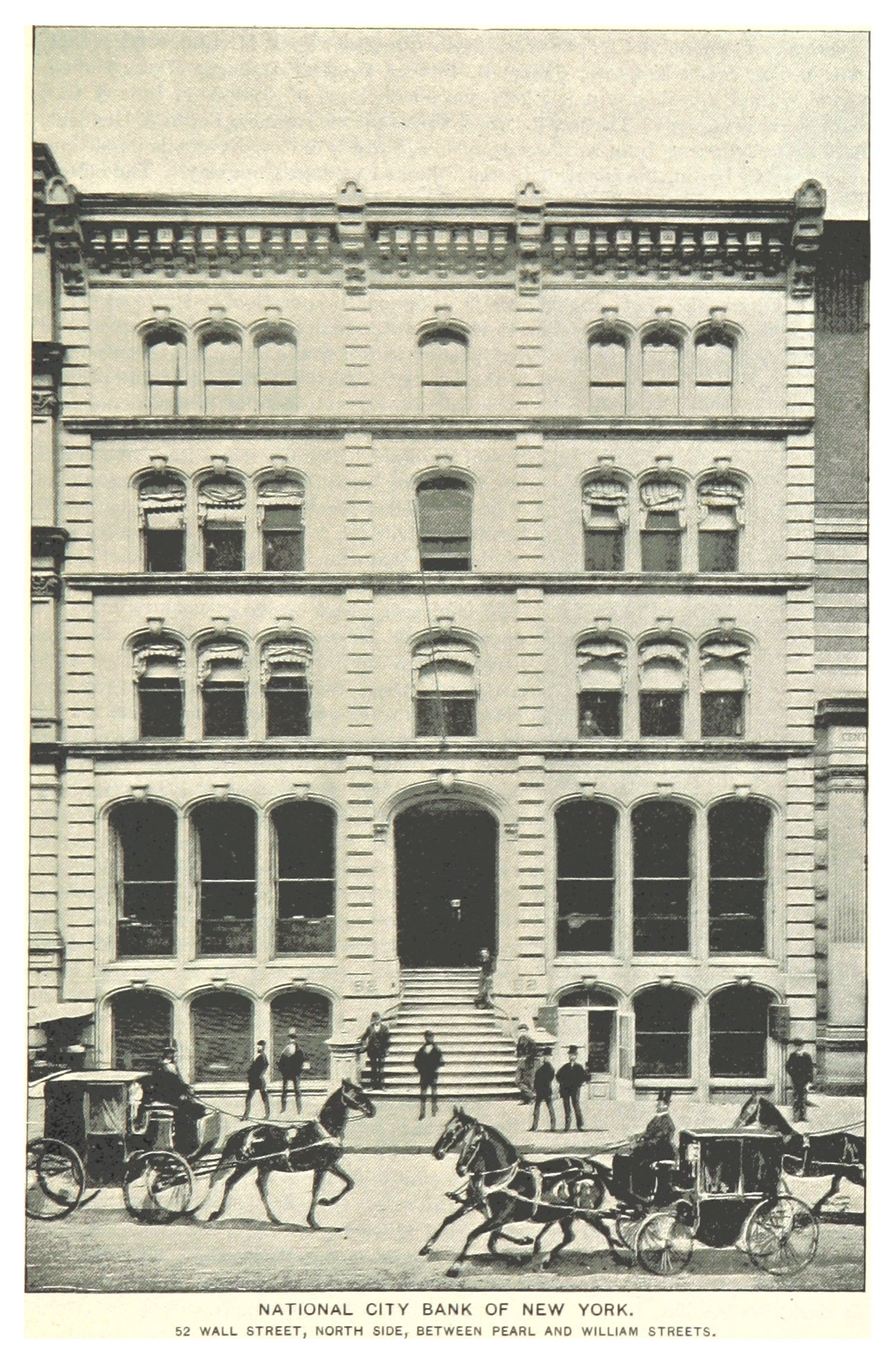
52 Wall Street, c. 1890

=== 19th century ===
The City Bank of New York was founded on June 16, 1812. The first president of the City Bank was the statesman and retired Colonel, Samuel Osgood. After Osgood's death in August 1813, William Few became President of the bank, staying until 1817, followed by Peter Stagg (1817–1825), Thomas Smith (1825–1827), Isaac Wright (1827–1832), and Thomas Bloodgood (1832–1843). After the Panic of 1837, Moses Taylor acquired control of the company. During Taylor's ascendancy, the bank functioned largely as a treasury and finance center for Taylor's own extensive business empire. Later presidents of the bank included Gorham A. Worth (1843–1856), Moses Taylor himself (1856–1882), Taylor's son-in-law Percy Rivington Pyne I, and James Stillman (1891–1909).

In 1831, City Bank was the site of one of America's first bank heists when two burglars, James Honeyman and William J. Murray, made off with tens of thousands of dollars' worth of bank notes, and 398 gold doubloons, the equivalent of $52 million in 2013 currency.

The bank financed war bonds for the War of 1812, serving as a founding member of the financial clearinghouse in New York (1853), underwriting the Union during the American Civil War with $50 million in war bonds, opening the first foreign exchange department of any bank (1897), and receiving a $5 million deposit to be given to Spain for the US acquisition of the Philippines (1899). In 1865, the bank joined the national banking system of the United States under the National Bank Act and became The National City Bank of New York. By 1868, it was one of the largest banks in the United States. The bank became the largest bank in New York City following the Panic of 1893. Two years later, in 1895, it had become the largest bank in the U.S.

=== 20th century ===
The Citibank logo, designed by Dan Friedman from Anspach Grossman Portugal of New York City and used by the bank from 1976 until 1999. The logo was gradually replaced worldwide with the current logo in early 2000s, with Argentina and Venezuela being the last countries to use this logo until 2007 and 2010, respectively.

In 1904, the bank helped finance the Panama Canal. Two years later, in 1906, 11% of the U.S. federal government's bank balances were held by National City. National City at this time was the banker of Standard Oil, and the Chicago banking factions accused U.S. Secretary of the Treasury L. M. Shaw of having too close of a relationship with National City and other Wall Street operators. In 1907, Stillman, then the bank's chairman, intervened, along with J. P. Morgan and George Fisher Baker, in the Panic of 1907.

Between 1910 and 1911, the Department of State backed a consortium of American investors headed by Citibank to acquire control over the Banque Nationale de la République d'Haïti, which was the sole commercial bank of Haiti and served as the Haitian government's treasury. Citibank then lobbied for the United States occupation of Haiti, which began in 1915. During the occupation, Citibank imposed a US$30 million loan on the Haitian government, which was described by communist George Padmore as transforming Haiti into an "American slave colony". Citibank would go on to acquire some of its largest gains in the 1920s due to debt payments from Haiti, according to later filings to the Senate Finance Committee.

When the Federal Reserve Act allowed it, National City Bank became the first U.S. national bank to open an overseas banking office when it opened a branch in Buenos Aires, Argentina, in 1914. Many of Citi's present international offices are older; offices in London, Shanghai, Calcutta, and elsewhere were opened in 1901 and 1902 by the International Banking Corporation (IBC), a company chartered to conduct banking business outside the U.S., which was forbidden to U.S. national banks. In 1918, IBC became a wholly owned subsidiary and was subsequently merged into the bank. The same year, the bank evacuated all of its employees from Moscow and Petrograd as the Russian Civil War had begun, but also established a branch in Puerto Rico. By 1919, the bank had become the first U.S. bank to have $1 billion in assets.

As of March 9, 1921, there were four national banks in New York City operating branch offices: Chatham and Phenix National, the Mechanics and Metals National, the Irving National, and National City Bank.

Charles E. Mitchell, also called "Sunshine" Charlie Mitchell, was elected president in 1921. In 1929, he was made chairman, a position he held until 1933. Under Mitchell, the bank expanded rapidly and by 1930 had 100 branches in 23 countries outside the United States. The policies pursued by the bank under Mitchell's leadership are seen by many people as one of the prime causes of the stock market crash of 1929, which led ultimately to the Great Depression.

In 1933, the Pecora Commission, a United States Senate committee, investigated Mitchell for his part in tens of millions of dollars in losses, excessive pay, and tax avoidance, later leading to his resignation. U.S. Senator Carter Glass said of him, "Mitchell, more than any 50 men, is responsible for this stock crash."

On December 24, 1927, its headquarters in Buenos Aires, Argentina, were blown up by the Italian anarchist Severino Di Giovanni, in the frame of the international campaign supporting Sacco and Vanzetti.

In 1940 and 1941, branches in Germany and Japan closed. In 1945, the bank handled $5.6 billion in Treasury securities for War and Victory Loan drives for the U.S. government.

In 1952, James Stillman Rockefeller was elected president and then chairman in 1959, serving until 1967. Stillman was a direct descendant of the Rockefeller family through the William Rockefeller (the brother of John D.) branch. In 1960, his second cousin, David Rockefeller, became president of Chase Manhattan Bank, National City's long-time New York rival for dominance in the banking industry in the United States.

Following its merger with the First National Bank in 1955, the bank changed its name to The First National City Bank of New York, then shortened it to First National City Bank in 1962. It is also worth noting that the bank began recruiting at Harvard Business School in 1957, arranged the financing of the 1958 Hollywood film, South Pacific, and had its branches in Cuba nationalized in 1959 by the new socialist government, and has its first African-American director in 1969, Franklin A. Thomas.

The company organically entered the leasing and credit card sectors, and its introduction of US dollar-denominated certificates of deposit in London marked the first new negotiable instrument in the market since 1888. Later to become part of MasterCard, the bank introduced its First National City Charge Service credit card—popularly known as the "Everything Card"—in 1967.

In 1967, Walter B. Wriston became chairman and chief executive officer of the bank.

In the 1960s, the bank entered into the credit card business. In 1965, First National City Bank bought Carte Blanche from Hilton Hotels. Three years later, under pressure from the U.S. government, the bank sold this division. By 1968, the company created its own credit card. The card, known as "The Everything Card", was promoted as a kind of East Coast version of the BankAmericard. By 1969, First National City Bank decided that the Everything Card was too costly to promote as an independent brand and joined Master Charge (now MasterCard). Citibank unsuccessfully tried again from 1977 to 1987 to create a separate credit card brand, the Choice Card.

In 1967, First National City Bank reorganized as a one-bank holding company, First National City Corporation, or "Citicorp" for short. However, the bank had been nicknamed "Citibank" since the 1860s, when City Bank of New York adopted it as an eight-letter wire code address. "Citicorp" became the holding company's formal name in 1974, and in 1976, First National City Bank was renamed Citibank, N.A. The name change also helped to avoid confusion in Ohio with Cleveland-based National City Corp., though the banks never had any significant overlapping areas except for Citi credit cards issued in National City territory. In addition, at the time of the name change to Citicorp, in 1968, National City of Ohio was mostly a Cleveland-area bank and had not gone on its acquisition spree that would occur in the 1990s and 2000s. Any possible name confusion had Citi not changed its name from National City eventually became completely moot when PNC Financial Services acquired National City in 2008 during the subprime mortgage crisis.

In 1987, the bank set aside $3 billion in reserves for loan losses in Brazil and other developing countries. In 1990, the bank established a subsidiary in Poland. In 1994, it became the world's biggest card issuer.

Also in the 1980s, the bank launched the Citicard, which allowed customers to perform all transactions without a passbook. Branches also had terminals with simple one-line displays that allowed customers to get basic account information without a bank teller.

John S. Reed was selected CEO in 1984, and Citi became a founding member of the CHAPS clearing house in London. Under his leadership, the next 14 years would see Citibank become the largest bank in the U.S., the largest issuer of credit cards and charge cards in the world, and expand its global reach to over 90 countries.

In 1981, Citibank chartered a South Dakota subsidiary to take advantage of new laws that raised the state's maximum permissible interest rate on loans to 25% (then the highest in the nation). In many other states, usury laws prevented banks from charging interest that aligned with the extremely high costs of lending money in the late 1970s and early 1980s, making consumer lending unprofitable. There is no current maximum interest rate or usury restriction under South Dakota law when a written agreement is formed.

Citi acquired United Bank of Arizona and Great Western Bank & Trust in the 1980s, but sold its Arizona operations to Norwest in 1993.

=== 21st century ===
In 2005, Federated Department Stores, now Macy's, Inc., sold its consumer credit portfolio to Citigroup, which reissued its cards under the name Department Stores National Bank (DSNB).

As of 2013, Citibank employed 2,900 people in Sioux Falls, South Dakota, and contributed to the state holding more bank assets than any other state.

In 2013, Citibank purchased the credit card portfolio of Best Buy from Capital One.

On April 1, 2016, Citigroup became the exclusive issuer of Costco's branded credit cards.

The bank's private-label credit card division, Citi Retail Services, provides store-issued credit cards, as a B2B service, to other companies, including American Airlines, Best Buy, ConocoPhillips, Costco, ExxonMobil, The Home Depot, Sears, Shell Oil, and Staples Inc.

In August 2020, Citibank, acting as administrative agent for a syndicated loan to cosmetics company Revlon, mistakenly transferred approximately $900 million of its own funds to Revlon's lenders while intending to make an interest payment of about $7.8 million. While some lenders returned the funds, others retained approximately $500 million, prompting Citibank to sue for their return. In 2021, a federal district court ruled that the lenders could retain the disputed funds under New York's "discharge-for-value" rule, but the decision was reversed by the United States Court of Appeals for the Second Circuit in September 2022. Citibank subsequently reached agreements with the remaining lenders, with about three-quarters of the mistaken payments ultimately returned. The case also led to the adoption of erroneous-payment provisions in syndicated loan agreements, commonly known as "Revlon clauses", requiring lenders to return payments mistakenly made by administrative agents.

==== Automatic teller machines ====
In the 1970s, Citibank was one of the first U.S. banks to introduce automatic teller machines (ATMs), which gave customers 24-hour access to cash.

=== Expansion ===
Citibank's footprint as of April 2026

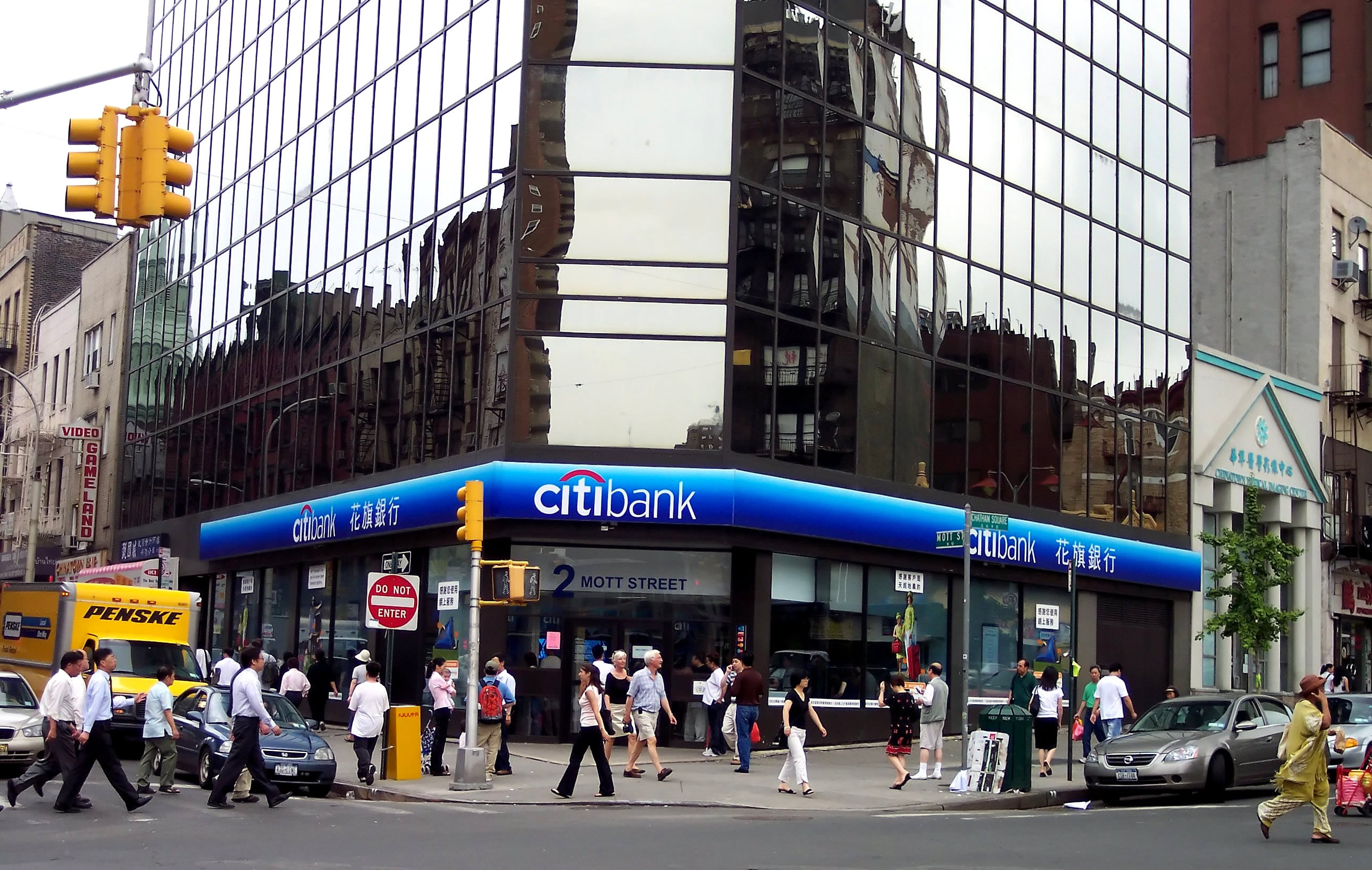
Citibank's branch in Manhattan Chinatown in New York City

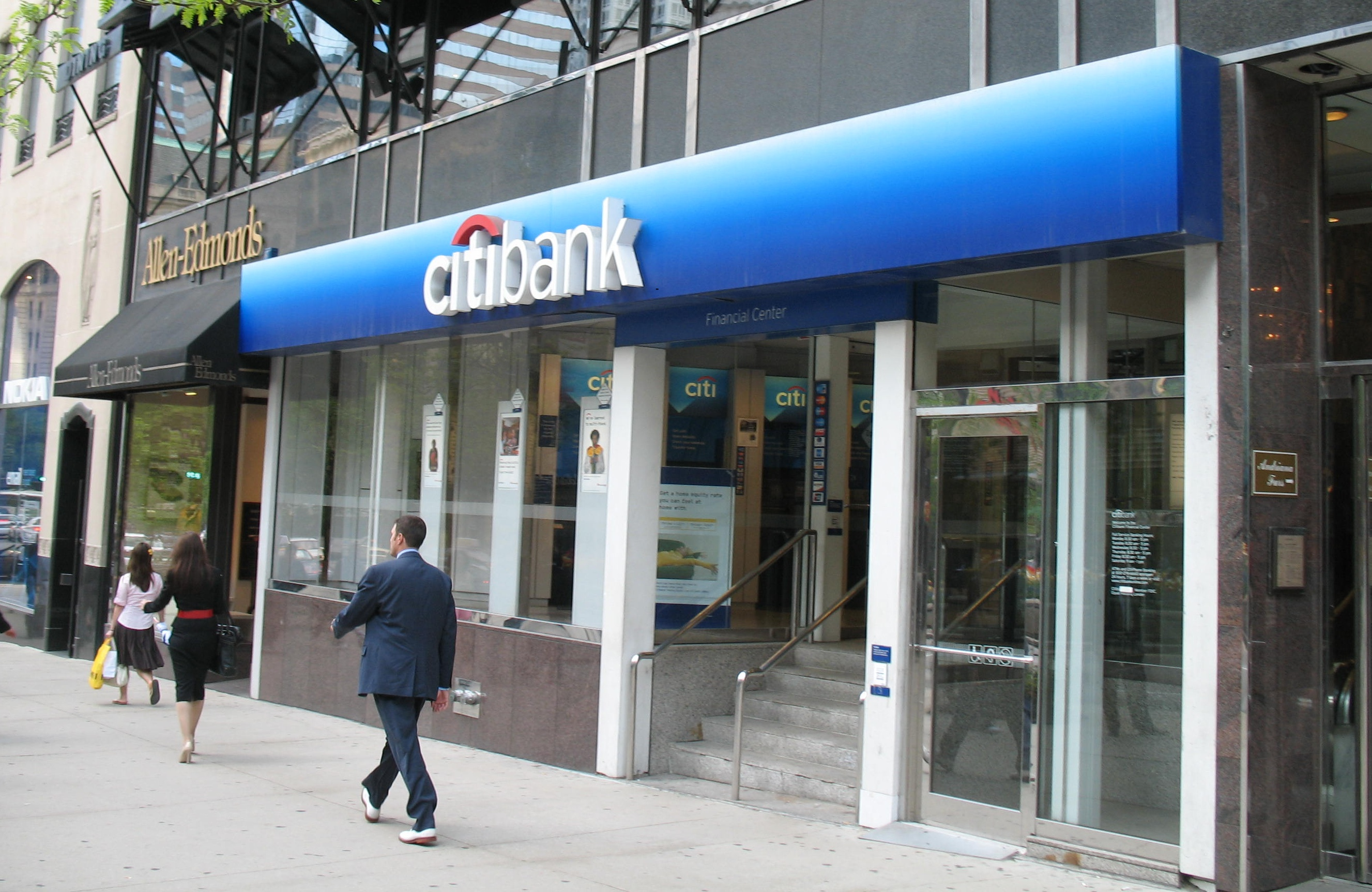
Citibank's branch on Michigan Avenue in Chicago

In 2002, Citigroup, the parent of Citibank, acquired Golden State Bancorp and its California Federal Bank, which was one-third owned by Ronald O. Perelman, for $5.8 billion.

In 1999, Citibank was sued for improperly charging late fees on its credit cards.

In August 2004, Citigroup entered the Texas market with the purchase of First American Bank of Bryan, Texas. The deal established the firm's retail banking presence in Texas, giving Citibank over 100 branches, $3.5 billion in assets and approximately 120,000 customers in the state.

In 2006, the bank entered the Philadelphia market, opening 23 branches in the metropolitan area. In 2013, Citibank closed these locations for "efficiency-driven" reasons.

In 2006, the company announced a naming rights sponsorship deal for the new stadium of New York Mets, Citi Field, which opened in 2009. The deal reportedly required payments by Citi of $20 million per year for 20 years.

As of September 2020, Citibank's US branches are located in the metropolitan areas of New York, Los Angeles, San Francisco, Sacramento, San Diego, Washington DC, Las Vegas, Miami, and Chicago. California is home to the majority of Citibank's US branches, with 292 branches located in the state.'

Citi announced it may return its retail banking presence to Dallas in 2022. Citibank will take more than 9,000 square feet of space in the Berkshire Court building at Preston and Northwest Highway. Construction is scheduled to start on the new office early next year, according to planning documents filed with the state. The new Citibank office is described as an "experience center" in the planning documents. The plans identify the operation as "retail bank/office space". Citibank doesn't have a major retail banking presence in the Dallas area. A spokesman in the bank's New York office would not give details about what is planned in the North Dallas location. "We'll decline to comment on this," said Citibank's Drew Benson in an email.

=== 2007–2009 losses and cost-cutting measures by parent Citigroup ===
On April 11, 2007, Citigroup, the parent of Citibank, announced layoffs of 17,000 employees, or 8% of its workforce.

On November 4, 2007, Charles Prince resigned as the chairman and chief executive of Citigroup, the parent of Citibank, following crisis meetings with the board in New York in the wake of billions of dollars in losses related to subprime lending. Former United States Secretary of the Treasury Robert Rubin took over as chairman, subsequently hiring Vikram Pandit as chief executive.

On November 5, 2007, several days after Merrill Lynch announced that it too had been losing billions from the subprime mortgage crisis in the United States, Citi reported that it will lose between $8 billion and $11 billion in the fourth quarter of 2007, in addition to the $6.5 billion it lost in the third quarter of 2007.

Effective November 30, 2007, Citibank sold its 17 Puerto Rico branches, along with $1.0 billion in deposits, to Banco Popular.

In January 2008, Citigroup reported a $10 billion loss in the fourth quarter of 2007, after an $18.1 billion write down.

In March 2008, Citibank set up Mobile Money Ventures, a joint venture with SK Telecom, to develop mobile apps for banking. It sold the venture to Intuit in June 2011.

In May 2008, the company closed an $87.5 million leaseback transaction for branches in New York City.

In July 2008, Citibank Privatkunden AG & Co. KGaA, the company's German division, was sold to Crédit Mutuel. On February 22, 2010, it was renamed to Targobank.

In August 2008, after a three-year investigation by the California Attorney General, Citibank was ordered to repay the $14 million that was removed from 53,000 customers accounts over an 11-year period from 1992 to 2003, plus an additional $4 million in interest and penalties. The money was taken under an electronic "account sweeping program" where any positive balances from over-payments or double payments were removed without notice to the customers.

As a result of the 2008 financial crisis and huge losses in the value of its subprime lending assets, Citigroup, the parent of Citibank, received a bailout in the form of an investment from the U.S. Treasury. On November 23, 2008, in addition to an initial investment of $25 billion, a further $20 billion was invested in the company along with guarantees for risky assets of $306 billion. The guarantees were issued at a time markets were not confident Citi had enough liquidity to cover losses from those investments. Eventually, the Citi shares the Treasury took over in return for the guarantees it issued were booked as net profit for the treasury as Citi had enough liquidity and guarantees did not have to be used. By 2010, Citibank had repaid the loans from the Treasury in full, including interest, resulting in a net profit for the U.S. federal government.

On January 16, 2009, Citigroup announced that it was separating Citi Holdings Inc., its non-core businesses such as brokerage, asset management, and local consumer finance and higher-risk assets, from Citicorp. The split was presented as allowing Citibank to concentrate on its core banking business.

=== 2010 to present ===
On October 19, 2011, Citigroup, the parent of Citibank, agreed to a $285 million civil fraud penalty after the U.S. Securities and Exchange Commission accused the company of betting against risky mortgage-related investments that it sold to its clients.

In 2014, Citigroup announced it would exit retail banking in 11 markets, primarily in Europe and Central America. In September 2014, it exited the Texas market with the sale of 41 branches to BB&T. In September 2015, the bank announced that it would close its 17 branches in Massachusetts and end sponsorship of a theater in Boston.

In 2015, the bank was ordered to pay $770 million in relief to borrowers for illegal credit card practices. The Consumer Financial Protection Bureau said that about 7 million customer accounts were affected by Citibank's "deceptive marketing" practices, which included misrepresenting costs and fees and charging customers for services they did not receive.

On March 1, 2017, an article in The Economic Times of India stated that Citibank may close its 44 branches in India, as digital transactions made them less necessary. The articles wrote that Citibank was "India's most profitable foreign lender".

On March 20, 2017, The Guardian reported that hundreds of banks had helped launder FSB-related funds out of Russia, as uncovered by an investigation named Russian Laundromat. Citibank was listed among the American banks that were named as having handled the laundered funds, with banks in the US processing around $63.7 million between 2010 and 2014. Citibank was listed as having processed $37 million of that amount, with others including Bank of America, which processed $14 million, as the bank "handled $113.1 million" in Laundromat cash.

In March 2018, Citibank announced a new firearms policy, placing restrictions on financial transactions in the U.S. firearm industry.

In April 2021, Citibank announced it would exit its consumer banking operations in 13 markets, including Australia, Bahrain, China, India, Indonesia, South Korea, Malaysia, the Philippines, Poland, Russia, Taiwan, Thailand and Vietnam.

In January 2022, Citi further announced its plan to exit consumer banking in Mexico (also known as Citibanamex), as well as small-business and middle-market banking operations.

In September 2022, Citi announced plans to wind down retail banking in the UK.

In 2023, amid a 2018–2025 Federal Reserve asset cap imposed on Wells Fargo, Citibank displaced it as the third-largest U.S. bank.

In January 2024, Citi reported a $1.8 billion loss in the fourth quarter of 2023 and announced plans to cut 20,000 jobs, roughly 8% of its workforce.

At the bank's 2024 investor day, Citi highlighted its Services division, which produces income from "financial pipes".

In March 2025, Citi paid out £215,000 in a discrimination settlement for a former employee after she lost out on an expected promotion when she returned from maternity leave.

Market	Acquirer/status	Announcement date	Consideration (US$)	Ref.
Australia	National Australia Bank	2021-08-09	882 million	
Indonesia, Malaysia, Thailand and Vietnam	United Overseas Bank	2022-01-13	3.36 billion	
Japan	Sumitomo Mitsui Banking Corporation	2015-11-01	N/A	
South Korea	Winding down "in phases"	2021-10-25	N/A	
Philippines	UnionBank of the Philippines	2021-12-23	908 million	
Taiwan	DBS Bank	2022-01-28	706.6 million	
India	Axis Bank	2022-03-30	1.6 billion	
Bahrain	Ahli United Bank	2022-04-06	Unknown	
China (Consumer Wealth Portfolio)	HSBC	2023-10-09	Unknown	

== Chairmen ==
Since the bank's founding in 1812, it has been led by a President, with Samuel Osgood being elected as the first President. In 1909, James Stillman became the first chairman of the company.

=== List of Chairmen ===
1. Samuel Osgood (1812–1813)
2. William Few (1813–1817)
3. Peter Staff (1817–1825)
4. Thomas Smith (1825–1827)
5. Isaac Wright (1827–1832)
6. Thomas Bloodgood (1832–1844)
7. Gorham A. Worth (1844–1856)
8. Moses Taylor (1856–1882)
9. Percy Pyne (1882–1891)
10. James Stillman (1891–1918)
11. Frank A. Vanderlip (1918–1919)
12. James A. Stillman (1919–1921)
13. Charles E. Mitchell (1921–1933)
14. James H. Perkins (1933–1940)
15. Gordon Sohn Rentschler (1940–1948)
16. William Gage Brady Jr. (1948–1952)
17. Howard C. Sheperd (1952–1959)
18. James Stillman Rockefeller (1959–1967)
19. George S. Moore (1967–1970)
20. Walter B. Wriston (1970–1984)
21. John S. Reed (1984–1998)
22. John S. Reed and Sandy Weill (1998–2000)
23. Sandy Weill (2000–2006)
24. Charles Prince (2006–2007)
25. Sir Win Bischoff (2007–2009)
26. Dick Parsons (2009–2012)
27. Michael O'Neill (2012–2019)
28. John Dugan (2019–2025)
29. Jane Fraser (2025–)

== Controversies ==
=== Alleged money laundering by Raul Salinas ===
In 1998, the General Accounting Office issued a report critical of Citibank's handling of funds received from Raul Salinas de Gortari, brother of Carlos Salinas, the former president of Mexico. The report, titled "Raul Salinas, Citibank and Alleged Money Laundering", indicated that Citibank facilitated the transfer of millions of dollars through complex financial transactions that hid the funds' paper trail. The report indicated that Citibank took on Salinas as a client without making a thorough inquiry as to how he made his fortune, an omission that a Citibank official called a violation of the bank's "know your customer" policy.

=== Yakuza links ===
Citibank has been punished by the Japanese Financial Services Agency twice (2004 and 2009) for aiding and abetting money laundering by yakuza members; there was no punishment from the U.S. side. In 2004–2006, Immigration Customs Enforcement (ICE) seized close to $1 million worth of assets in the United States owned by Susumu Kajiyama, the so-called emperor of loan sharks, and a Yamaguchi-gumi Goryokai member.

"In 2004, Citibank (Japan) lost their private banking license because they were allowing yakuza to do many complex transactions," Jake Adelstein, author of "Tokyo Vice" and an expert on Japan's mafia – known as the yakuza – told CNN. "They got 'spanked' in 2009 for failing to update their databases and allowing yakuza to do business with them again."

=== Funding of the Dakota Access Pipeline ===
Citibank is one of the lead lenders to the developers of the Dakota Access Pipeline project in North Dakota, a 1,172-mile-long (1,886 km) oil pipeline project. The pipeline has been controversial regarding its potential environmental impacts and impacts to Siouan sacred lands and water supply. According to a statement by Hugh MacMillan, a senior researcher on water, energy and climate issues, Citibank has been "running the books on this project, and that's the bank that beat the bushes and got other banks to join in."

On December 13, 2016, students of Columbia University protested outside of the Citibank location on Broadway and 112th Street, by holding cardboard signs, chanting and passing flyers. Earlier that year, the university replaced the on-campus Citibank ATMs with ATMs from Santander Bank, a bank that has no ties to the Dakota Access Pipeline.

=== Libor Index Settlement ===
Preceded by other banks involved in the Libor Scandal, Citibank in June 2018 reached a settlement with 42 U.S. states to pay a $100 million fine due to their manipulation of the London Inter-bank Offered Rate. Libor index is widely used as a reference rate for many financial instruments both in financial and commercial fields.

=== Security unit ===
In 2026, The Financial Times reported that Citibank's security unit, which was established with the intention "to protect the employees, assets, information, integrity and reputation of Citi and its clients" was actually serving the interests of the bank against Citibank employees who reported malfeasance. This came amid larger controversies about Citibank's compliance record: "Citi’s compliance has attracted scrutiny after a series of regulatory mishaps led the bank to be placed under consent orders from the Office of the Comptroller of the Currency and the Federal Reserve."

== Sponsorships ==
Citibank sponsors Citi Field, home of the New York Mets baseball club, as well as the Washington Open tennis championship.

Citibank became the major sponsor of the North Sydney Bears for the 1992 NSWRL season

The firm became a sponsor of the Australian Rugby Union team in 2001 for a three-year deal, and a major sponsor of the Sydney Swans in 2005, who play in the Australian Football League.

In the late 1970s, First National City was heavily involved in Indy Car racing, sponsoring major drivers like Johnny Rutherford and Al Unser, Sr. Unser won the 1978 Indianapolis 500 in First National City Travelers Checks livery.

In Formula 1, First National City was the sponsor of team Tyrrell in 1977 and 1978, with the First National City Travelers Checks livery also. They're currently sponsoring Fernando Alonso in Formula 1.

Citibank is the main sponsor of New York City's bike-share scheme Citi Bike since its launch in 2013.

== See also ==
- Citigroup Center
- List of chairmen of Citigroup
- Sanford I. Weill
- ATM Industry Association
