= James Stillman Rockefeller =

American banker and Olympic rower (1902–2004)

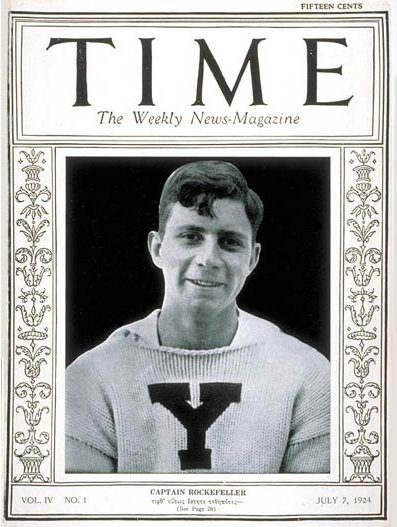
- Rockefeller in Time magazine in 1924
- Born: June 8, 1902; Manhattan, New York City, US
- Died: August 10, 2004 (aged 102); Greenwich, Connecticut, US
- Education: The Taft School (1920); Yale University (1924)
- Spouse: Nancy Carnegie (m. 1925; died 1994)
- Children: 4
- Parent(s): William Goodsell Rockefeller; Elsie Stillman
- Relatives: Rockefeller family

James Stillman Rockefeller
Medal record

Men's rowing

Representing the United States

Olympic Games
Gold medal – first place	1924 Paris	Men's eight

James Stillman Rockefeller (June 8, 1902 – August 10, 2004) was a member of the prominent U.S. Rockefeller family. He won an Olympic rowing title for the United States, then became president of what eventually became Citigroup. He was a trustee of the American Museum of Natural History and a member of the board of overseers of Memorial Sloan Kettering Cancer Center.

== Early life and rowing ==
He was born on June 8, 1902, to William Goodsell Rockefeller (1870–1922) and Elsie Stillman, daughter of James Stillman, in the Manhattan borough of New York City. He graduated from The Taft School, Watertown, Connecticut, in 1920, and graduated from Yale University in 1924, where he was elected to Scroll and Key and Phi Beta Kappa. He was also a member of Delta Kappa Epsilon. That same year Rockefeller captained a crew of Yale teammates that included Benjamin Spock. They won a gold medal in rowing at the 1924 Summer Olympics in Paris, France. Rockefeller appeared on the cover of Time magazine on July 7, 1924.

== Career ==
Rockefeller returned from the Olympics and spent the next six years with the Wall Street banking firm of Brown Bros. & Co. In 1930, he joined the National City Bank in New York, of which his maternal grandfather, James Stillman, had once been president and chairman of the board. Rockefeller himself became president of the bank in 1952, and chairman of the board in 1959. He retired as chairman in 1967. During his tenure, the bank merged with the smaller First National Bank and took the name The First National City Bank of New York.

Under each of his successors, the bank's name has changed: George S. Moore shortened it to "First National City Bank" and formed a holding company, First National City Corp. Under Walter B. Wriston these became "Citibank" (the bank's long-time nickname) and "Citicorp" respectively. Under John Reed the firm merged with Travelers Group to become Citigroup. During World War II, Rockefeller served in the Airborne Command.

== Personal life ==
On April 15, 1925, he married Nancy Carnegie, who died in 1994. She was a granddaughter of Thomas M. Carnegie and grandniece of Andrew Carnegie. Nancy helped establish the Greenwich Maternal Health Center in 1935. Together, they had four children:

- James Stillman Rockefeller Jr. (1926–2025), who was married to Liv Coucheron Torp (d. 1969), who had previously been married to Thor Heyerdahl. He had previously been engaged to Margaret Wise Brown before her death.
- Nancy Sherlock Rockefeller, who married Barclay McFadden Jr. (d. 1973), After his death, she married Daniel Noyes Copp (d. 2015)
- Andrew Carnegie Rockefeller, who married Jean Victoria Mackay
- Georgia Stillman Rockefeller, who married James Harden Rose

Rockefeller died on August 10, 2004, at the age of 102 in Greenwich, Connecticut, following a stroke.

=== Residences ===
Rockefeller lived in Greenwich, Connecticut, in a 19,000-square-foot (1,800 m^{2}) brick Georgian mansion, built in 1929, with 11 bedrooms and 16 marble bathrooms on four levels. There are 12 fireplaces, an elevator, an outdoor pool and English gardens. His house was sold in 2004 for $13.4 million and resold in 2009 for $23.9 million.

In January 1937, he became the full owner of Long Valley Farm near Spring Lake in Cumberland County and Harnett County, North Carolina.

=== Legacy ===
At the time of his death, Rockefeller had four children, fourteen grandchildren, thirty-seven great-grandchildren, and one great-great-granddaughter. Aged 102, he was America's oldest living Olympic champion, and the earliest living cover subject of Time magazine.

Business positions
Preceded by Howard C. Sheperd	Chairman of First National City Bank; 1959–1967	Succeeded by George S. Moore
Awards and achievements
Preceded by William Howard Taft	Cover of Time Magazine; July 7, 1924	Succeeded by Alexey Rykov
