= Feigen =

Feigen is a surname. Notable people with the surname include:

- Brenda Feigen (born 1944), American activist, film producer, lawyer and writer
- Jimmy Feigen (born 1989), American swimmer
- Marc Feigen (born 1961), American chief executive
- Richard L. Feigen (1930–2021), American art dealer
