= Thomas Nelson Perkins =

American lawyer (1870–1937)

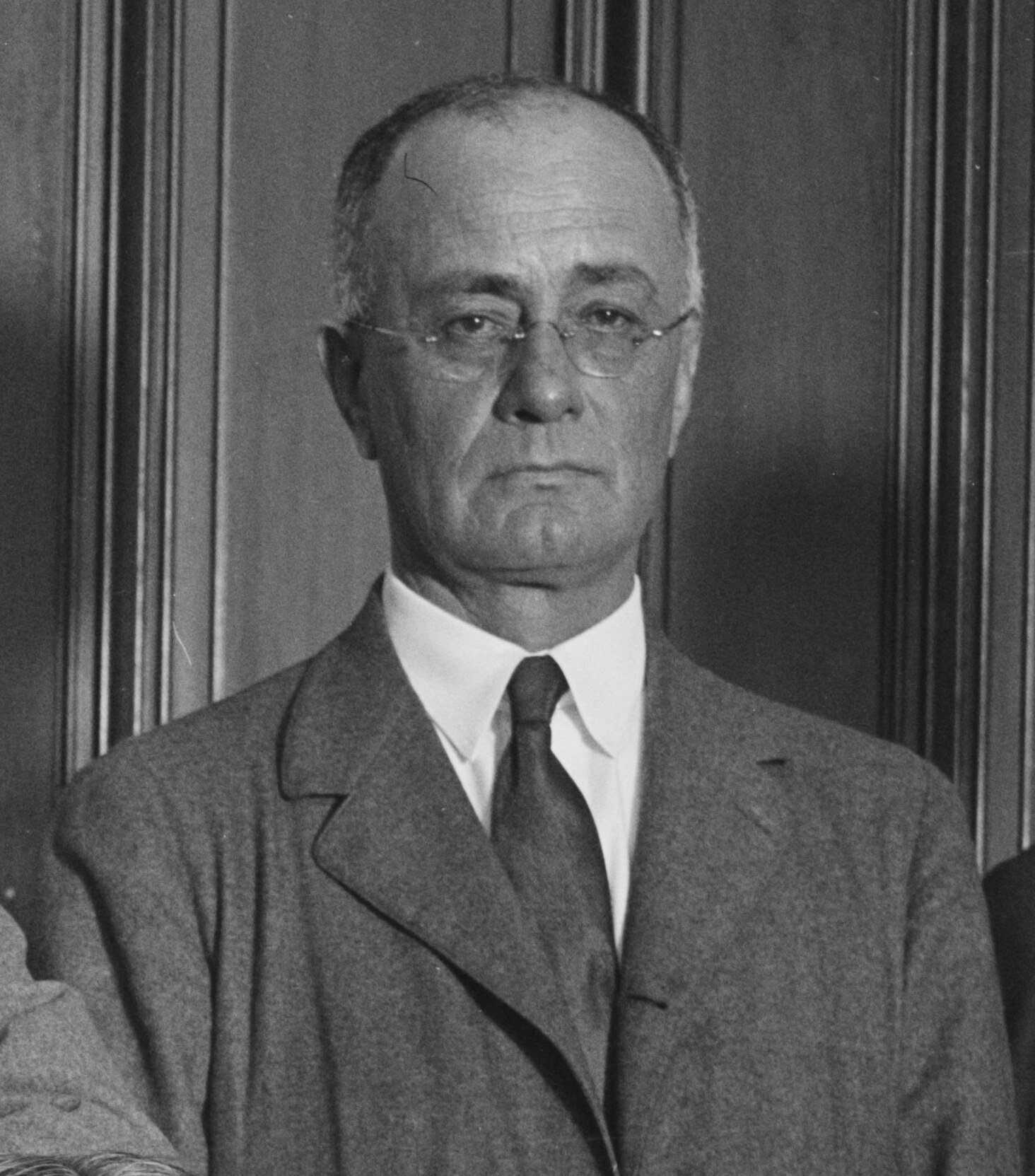
- Perkins in 1929
- Born: May 6, 1870; Milton, Massachusetts, U.S.
- Died: October 7, 1937 (aged 67); Westwood, Massachusetts, U.S.
- Resting place: Milton, Massachusetts, U.S.
- Education: Harvard College (AB, LLB)
- Occupation: Lawyer
- Spouse: Louisa Catherine Adams (m. 1900)
- Children: 3
- Relatives: James H. Perkins (brother); Thomas Handasyd Perkins (great-uncle)

Thomas Nelson Perkins (May 6, 1870 – October 7, 1937) was an American lawyer from Massachusetts. He was assistant to the Secretary of War in 1917 and was chief counsel and a member of the priorities commission of the War Industries Board. Following the war, he was a member of the Paris Peace Conference and the Allied Reparations Committee.

== Early life ==
Thomas Nelson Perkins was born on May 6, 1870, in Milton, Massachusetts, to Jane Sedgwick (née Watson) and Edward Cranch Perkins. His brother was James H. Perkins. Perkins was educated in Hopkinson's School in Boston. He graduated from Harvard College in 1891 with a Bachelor of Arts. He was captain of the 1891 varsity rowing team at Harvard, which included his friend Nicholas Longworth. He graduated from Harvard Law School in 1894 with a Bachelor of Laws. He then spent a year studying abroad.

== Career ==
In 1896, Perkins became a member of the Ropes, Gray, & Loring law firm in Boston. He with fellow junior lawyer Roland W. Boyden helped expand the firm from an initial six lawyers to almost 60. The firm was later renamed Ropes, Gray, Boyden & Perkins, in 1914. Around 1899, Stone & Webster sent Perkins to Seattle to solve problems with traction lines of the city. He was appointed as chief counsel of the War Industries Board on October 24, 1917. From December 1917 to February 1, 1918, he served as a member of the board's priorities commission. On February 1, 1918, he was appointed assistant to E. R. Stettinius, surveyor general of supplies in the War Department. Following Stettinius's appointment as second assistant secretary of war, Perkins remained as assistant. In July 1918, he was appointed assistant to the Secretary of War and was in charge of the procurement and production of supplies. In September 1918, he was appointed assistant director of munitions and continued in that role until his resignation on November 26, 1918. He was in Russia during the Russian Revolution. He was part of the first house commission to the Paris Peace Conference. In 1924, he helped develop the Dawes Plan. From 1924 to 1926, he was a citizen member of the Inter-Allied Reparations Commission along with Jeremiah Smith Jr., Roland W. Boyden, Owen D. Young and J. P. Morgan. From 1926 to 1930, he was president of the arbitral tribunal of interpretation at The Hague. In 1929, he was an alternate to Owen D. Young in developing the Young Plan. He helped reorganize the Boston and Maine Railroad. He served as director from 1924 to 1937, chairman of the executive committee starting in 1928, and chairman of the board from 1930 to 1933. He helped raise US$13,000,000 towards the railroad and helped build the North Station. In 1929, he served as acting president of the railroad before being succeeded by Edward S. French.

In 1905, Perkins was selected as a fellow of the Harvard Corporation. He remained a member of the board until his resignation in 1924. He was elected to the board again in 1926 and served until his death. He was in opposition to the merger of Harvard with the Massachusetts Institute of Technology. He was also trustee of the Harvard Foundation. He was director of Boston & Main and the Southern Pacific. He was chairman of the board of the Commercial Radio International Committee and a member of the executive committee of the Old Colony Trust Company and the First National Bank of Boston. He was director of the Boston Madison Square Garden Corporation, Champion Copper Company, Flintkote Company, George H. Morrill Company, Merrimac Chemical Company, Postum Company, St. Mary's Canal Land Company, and Sullivan Machinery. He was president and director of Chickering Investment Company, director and chairman of the executive committee of the Puget Sound Power and Light Company, and vice president and director of the Railway and Light Securities Company. He was director and member of the executive committee of the Lee, Higginson Trust Company. He was member of the Somerset Club.

== Personal life ==
In 1900, Perkins married Louisa Catherine Adams, a daughter of Charles Francis Adams Jr. and cousin of Charles Francis Adams III. They had three sons, Elliot, James Handasyd and Thomas N. Jr.

Perkins had a coronary thrombosis in November 1936. He died on October 7, 1937, at his home on Clapboard Tree Street in Westwood. He was buried in Milton.

== Awards ==
In 1926, he received an honorary Doctor of Laws degree from Harvard Law School. In 1930, Perkins received a Doctor of Laws from Dartmouth College.
