= James Stillman =

American businessman (1850–1918)

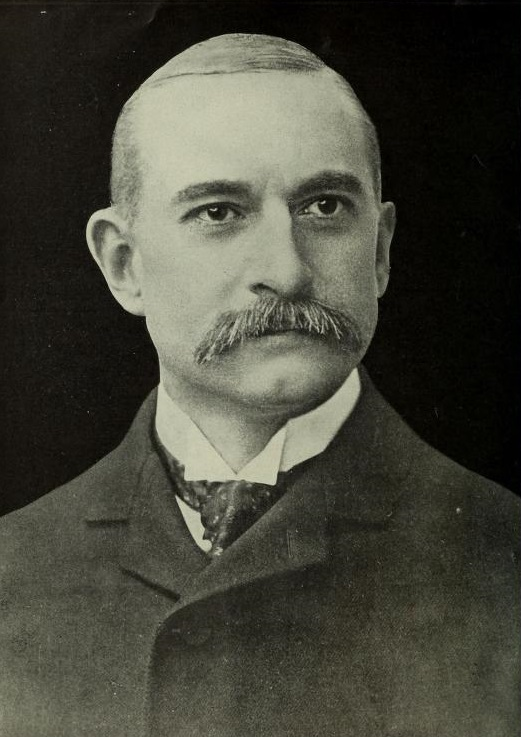

President of National City Bank
- In office 1891–1909
- Preceded by: Percy Rivington Pyne I
- Succeeded by: Frank Arthur Vanderlip, Sr.

Chairman of National City Bank
- In office 1909–1918
- Succeeded by: Frank Arthur Vanderlip, Sr.

Personal details
- Born: James Jewett Stillman; June 9, 1850 Brownsville, Texas, U.S.
- Died: March 15, 1918 (aged 67) New York City, U.S.
- Spouse: Sarah Elizabeth Rumrill
- Children: Sarah Elizabeth Stillman; James Alexander Stillman; Isabel Goodrich Stillman; Charles Chauncey Stillman; Ernest Goodrich Stillman
- Parent(s): Charles Stillman; Elizabeth Pamela Goodrich
- Occupation: Banker

James Jewett Stillman (June 9, 1850 – March 15, 1918) was an American businessman who invested in land, banking, and railroads in New York, Texas, and Mexico. He was chairman of the board of directors of the National City Bank. He forged alliances with the Rockefeller family, Standard Oil and Kuhn, Loeb & Co. to lay a foundation that made it, arguably, "the greatest bank in the Western Hemisphere." He engaged in an expansion policy that made National City the largest bank in the United States by 1894, the first to open foreign branches, and a leader in foreign exchange. By 1902, the bank was able to pay any sum of money to any city in the world within 24 hours. He was worth approximately $77 million at the time of his death, making him one of the wealthiest people in the country at the time.

== Biography ==
Stillman was born on June 9, 1850, to Charles Stillman (1810–1875) and Elizabeth Pamela Goodrich in Brownsville, Texas, a town founded by his father. Both of his parents were born in Wethersfield, Connecticut. Charles Stillman had significant business interests which James acquired in 1872. He expanded those to control of sixteen Texas banks and a significant land holdings in the Rio Grande Valley, particularly Corpus Christi and Kerrville, Texas.

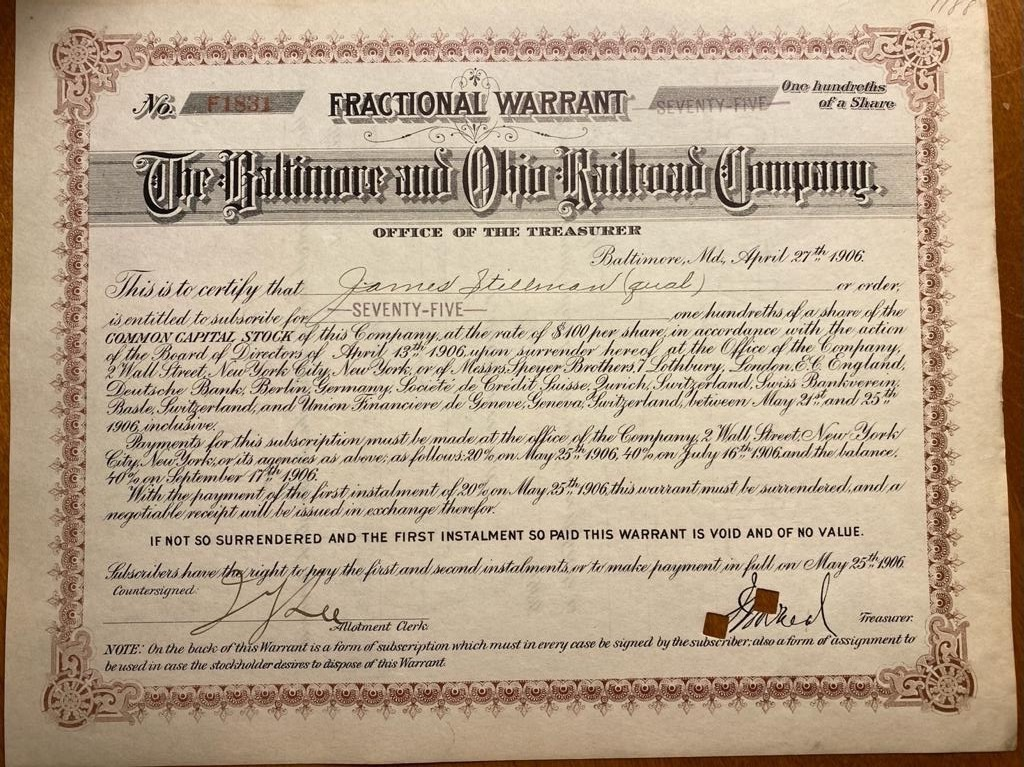
1906 Fractional Warrant certificate issued by the B&O railroad in favor of James Stillman

Stillman was an investor in a Fractional Warrant of the Baltimore & Ohio Railroad.

Along with Edward Henry Harriman, Jacob Henry Schiff and William Rockefeller, he controlled the most important Texas railroads (including the Texas and Pacific Railway, the Southern Pacific Railroad, the International-Great Northern Railroad, the Union Pacific Southern Railway, the St. Louis, Brownsville and Mexico Railway, and the Mexican National Railroad).

In 1876, Stillman supported Porfirio Díaz's overthrow of the government of Mexico by the Revolution of Tuxtepec.

He was president and later chairman of the board of directors of the National City Bank and retired in 1908.

He died on March 15, 1918, at his home at 9 East 72nd Street. His funeral was at St. Bartholomew's Episcopal Church, New York.

== Personal life and family ==
James Stillman was married to Sarah Elizabeth Rumrill from 1855 to 1925. Together they had:

- Sarah Elizabeth "Elsie" Stillman (1872–1935), who married William Goodsell Rockefeller (1870–1922), a son of Standard Oil senior executive William Rockefeller
- James Alexander Stillman (1873–1944), who married Anne Urquhart Potter. He also served as president of National City Bank of New York
- Isabel Goodrich Stillman (1876–1935), who married Percy Avery Rockefeller (1878–1934) in 1901. Percy was another son of William Rockefeller
- Charles Chauncey Stillman (1877–1926), who died aboard the RMS Aquitania and who married Mary E. White (1870–1925).
- Ernest Goodrich Stillman (1884–1949), who created Black Rock Forest and married Mildred Margaret Whitney (1890–1950)

Stillman was an intimate friend of both James O. Bloss and John William Sterling. After the death of James Gordon Bennett Jr., it was learned by the administrators of his estate that he had appointed Stillman one of the administrators and trustees. Stillman had little or no opportunity to act under the authority of Bennett's will, as he died two months before Bennett's death. Stillman named Sterling one of his executors. Sterling could hardly have begun his duties under Stillman's will when he too died a few months later. The Bennett estate, the Stillman estate and the Sterling estate totaled about $76,000,000. After Sterling's death it was learned that he had appointed his long time intimate companion, Bloss, one of the executors. And six months after Sterling's death, Bloss died.

=== Descendants ===
His grandchildren included Godfrey Stillman Rockefeller (1899–1983), a financier, and James Stillman Rockefeller (1902–2004), who married Nancy Carnegie (died 1994), grandniece of Andrew Carnegie. James also served as president of the National City Bank from 1952 to 1959 and was chairman of the board from 1959 to 1967. His great-grandson is the director, and Academy Award nominee, Whit Stillman (born 1952).

=== Legacy ===
In 1928, the C.O. Stillman was named in his honor. At the time, it was the largest oil tanker in the World. Stillman is considered to have been one of the 100 wealthiest Americans, having left an enormous fortune.

Business positions
Preceded by Percy Pyne	President/Chairman of National City Bank; 1891–1909 (President); 1909–1918 (Chairman)	Succeeded by Frank A. Vanderlip
