= Gorham A. Worth House =

Historic house in Ohio, United States

- U.S. National Register of Historic Places
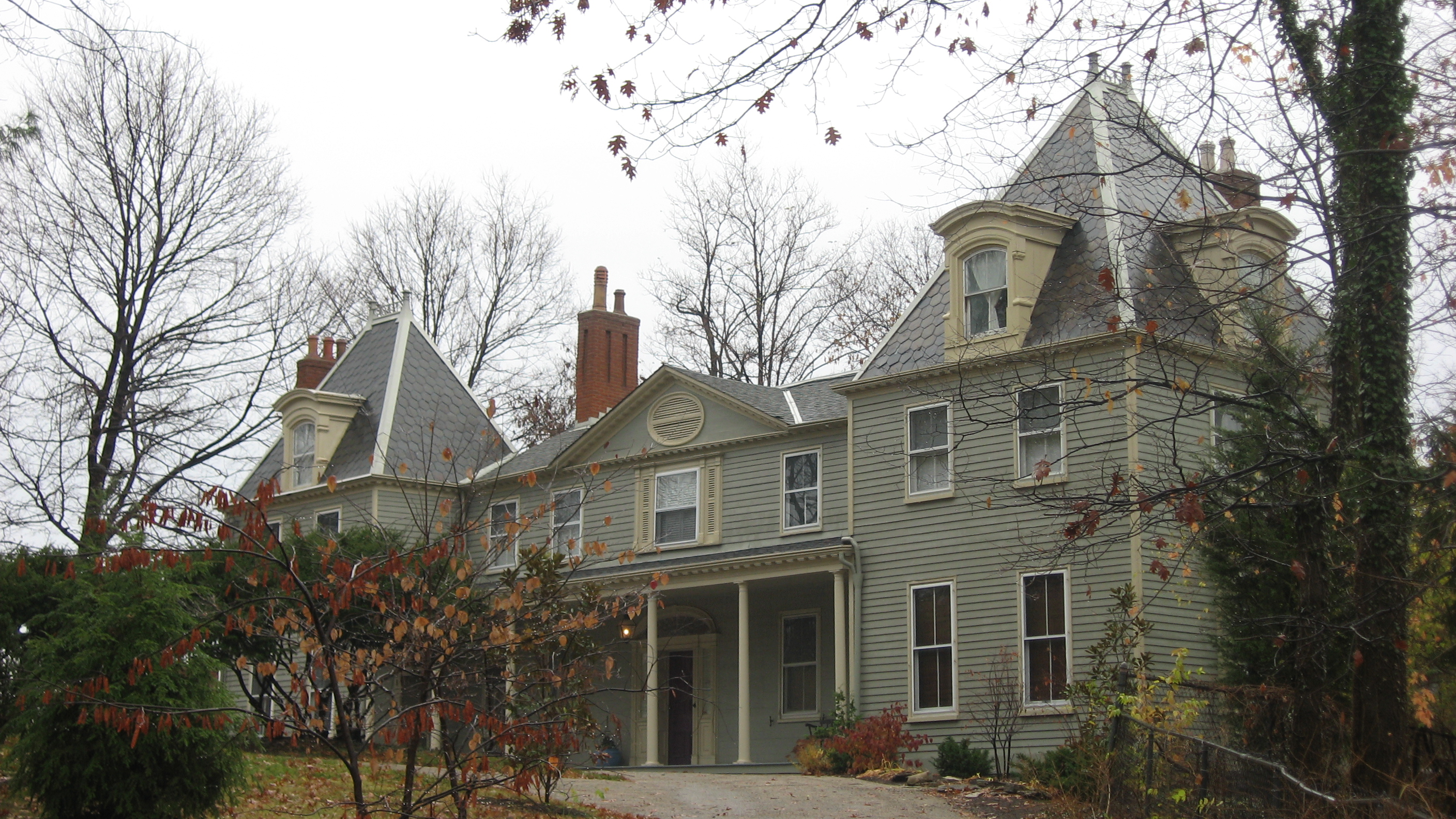
- Front of the house

- Location within Ohio Location within the United States
- Location: 2316 Auburncrest Ave., Cincinnati, Ohio
- Coordinates: 39°7′25″N 84°30′23″W
- Area: less than one acre
- Built: 1819
- Architect: Gorham A. Worth
- Architectural style: Federal
- NRHP reference No.: 73001472
- Added to NRHP: April 11, 1973

The Gorham A. Worth House is a historic residence in the Mount Auburn neighborhood of Cincinnati, Ohio, United States. Located atop a hill along Auburncrest Avenue, the house was built in 1819 in a version of the Federal style of architecture.

Gorham A. Worth purchased rural property northeast of the village of Cincinnati in 1818. He had settled in Hamilton County one year previously, having been named the cashier of the Cincinnati branch of the Bank of the United States. By the end of the following year, he had constructed the present two-story frame structure. Composed of a central structure, wings on each side, and a rear ell, the house features a large, five-bay porch around its entrance; among the distinctive elements of this porch are wooden columns crafted in the Tuscan order. The design of the main entrance closely resembles that of the grand Baum-Taft House in Lytle Park, which was constructed in the following year. Among the Worth House's later residents were the family of a locally prominent man, Robert McGregor; he was the namesake for a nearby street, McGregor Avenue, and he was of sufficient social status that his daughter was able to meet Albert, Prince of Wales, during his mid-century visit to the United States. After the McGregors, the house was home to the family of Guy Ward Mallon, a significant figure in the history of Ohio's political structure; he was responsible for introducing the Australian ballot into Ohio elections, for pioneering the effort to reorganize Cincinnati's city charter, and for writing a popular guide to elections.

One of the first houses to be built on Mount Auburn, the Gorham A. Worth House was listed on the National Register of Historic Places in 1973. It qualified for inclusion on the Register because of its well-preserved historic architecture, which was deemed to be significant throughout Ohio.
