= Adela Investment Company =

Private investment corporation

- Type: Private company
- Industry: Investment
- Founded: 1965
- Founder: Group of multinational companies
- Defunct: 1980 (not dissolved until 1994)
- Fate: Dissolved by its owners after bad loans
- Headquarters: Luxembourg City, Luxembourg
- Area served: South and central America
- Products: Development loans
- Owner: 242 private banks and companies

The Adela Investment Company was a private investment corporation created by multinational companies to promote economic and social development in Latin America and the Caribbean. Adela operated from 1965 to 1980 and was dissolved in 1994.

During that period, Adela financed over a thousand private ventures throughout the region. Its model for development was replicated in Africa and Asia. Its investment policies were later adapted by hundreds of investment funds operating throughout the developing world.

== Origin ==
In 1962, President John F. Kennedy proposed the Alliance for Progress between the United States and the developing countries of Latin America and the Caribbean. The idea was to encourage Latin America to undertake economic and social reforms. In exchange, the United States and the international aid agencies would provide the funding to support the reforms.

A Republican senator from New York, Jacob Javits, proposed that the world's business community join to form a new corporation that would underwrite private sector investments throughout Latin America. He wanted the private sector to complement governmental programs under the Alliance for Progress. He presented his ideas to a NATO parliamentary meeting in Paris in November 1963. His proposal was endorsed by the delegates, who passed a resolution recommending that the secretaries general of the Organization of Economic Cooperation and Development (OECD), the Organization of American States (OAS) and the Inter-American Development Bank (IDB) give their support.

A task force was created and funded by the Ford Foundation, led by George S. Moore, president of the First National City Bank (now Citibank); Hermann Abs of Germany's Deutsche Bank; and Gianni Agnelli of Fiat, among others. The group proposed to create the Atlantic Development Group for Latin America, or "Adela" for short. They were joined by Senator Javits in inviting private corporations from Europe, North America and Japan to capitalize this new venture.

Adela was incorporated in Luxembourg on September 24, 1964. It hired a Swiss engineer, Ernst Keller, as its first managing director and opened its operations center in Lima, Peru, in early 1965.

Adela's founders set out five objectives:

1. To make a significant contribution to the economic development of Latin America.
2. To encourage local and foreign investment throughout the region.
3. To earn a reasonable return on its investments.
4. To encourage Latin American countries to maintain a favorable climate for foreign investment.
5. To work closely with its shareholders.

== Shareholders, directors and advisers ==
A total of 242 private banks and companies invested in Adela. No one shareholder was allowed to own more than 1% of the company so that no single investor could exert excessive influence over its operations. As a bloc, Europe provided the largest number of shareholders, although the United States was the most important single country. Shareholders also came from Japan and six Latin American nations. The combined net worth of Adela's shareholders was the highest of any private corporation ever.

Adela's founders included many of the best known company presidents and chairmen, including men such as Marcus Wallenburg Sr., Chairman of Stockholms Enskilda Bank, Mogens Pagh, Chairman of Denmark's East Asiatic Company, Friederick Philips, Chairman of Gloeilampen Fabrieken of Eindhoven of the Netherlands, W. Earle McLaughlin, Chairman of the Royal Bank of Canada. Henry Ford II of the Ford Motor Company, William Blackie of Caterpillar, Sam Carpenter III of du Pont, Max Eisenring, Chairman of Swiss Reinsurance, Thomas J. Watson Jr. of International Business Machines, Yoshinzane Miki of The Fuji Bank, Oskar Nathan of Dresdner Bank and Samuel Schweiser of Swiss Bank Corporation.

Adela's Managing Director, Ernst Keller, was advised on business issues by Peter Drucker of the United States, on political matters by Alejandro Orfila of Argentina, a two time Secretary General of the Organization of American States, and on shareholder relations with Marcus Wallenburg Sr. of Sweden.

== Investment policies ==
Adela was designed to make minority investments in private corporations in the developing countries of Latin America. The company sought to divest its holdings once they became profitable and would then reinvest the proceeds in a new business. The company also made medium term loans for specific projects, but its primary function was to provide risk capital to Latin American businesses. On occasion, Adela acted as an entrepreneur by taking the lead in creating a new business.

Adela worked closely with the Inter-American Development Bank (IDB), the International Finance Corporation (IFC) and the United States Agency for International Development (USAID). The IDB and the IFC both made long-term loans to Adela, while USAID provided long-term funding to financial institutions created by Adela with local Latin American investors.

== Investments and impact ==
Adela funded over 1,000 private companies for a total amount of $2.5 billion. The size of these investments varied from small printing companies to large steel mills, pulp and paper, hotels, resorts and chemicals. It helped start local development finance companies, which themselves financed even more businesses. At its peak, assets reached half a billion dollars.

The Adela model was replicated in Asia (PICA-the Private Investment Company for Asia) originally based in Tokyo, in Africa (SIFIDA-the Societé Internationale Financière pour les Investissements et le Développement en Afrique) based in Geneva and in agriculture (LAAD-Latin American Agribusiness Development Corporation) based in Miami. All were capitalized by multinational corporations and funded investments in private enterprise.

== Dissolution ==
Adela earned a profit in its first year of operations and continued posting strong earnings for its first decade. However, a growing number of its investments were failing, which forced the company to cease writing new business in 1980. Control of the company was taken over by a creditors committee, management spent 15 years recovering assets, and Adela was finally dissolved on September 24, 1994.
