= The Everything Card =

Credit card

The First National City Charge Service, marketed as The Everything Card, was an early credit card introduced by First National City Bank (now Citibank) in the eastern United States in 1967. It was intended as a response to the BankAmericard (today's Visa card), issued by BankAmerica.

Issued under the initiative of National City Bank President Walter B. Wriston, the card followed the bank's purchase of an interest in the Carte Blanche charge card.

== Information ==
The card proved to be limited by its regional scope, as it was tied to the area surrounding the bank's New York City base of operations.

In 1969, the card was absorbed into Master Charge (now known as MasterCard), another card that had been developed by a membership association of four banks, the Interbank Card Association, which National City Bank joined.

Citibank, as First National City Bank came to be known in 1976, made a further attempt in 1977 to create a proprietary credit card that was not tied to either Master Charge or Visa.

The Choice card was, like the Everything Card, a regional credit card issued only by Citibank. It also proved unsuccessful, and its cards were reissued as Visa cards in 1987.

== See also ==
- Accolades Card
