= Charles Stillman =

American banker (1810–1875)

- Born: November 4, 1810; Wethersfield, Connecticut, U.S.
- Died: December 18, 1875 (aged 65); New York City, U.S.
- Known for: Founder of Brownsville, Texas
- Spouse: Elizabeth Pamela Goodrich
- Children: James Stillman

Charles Stillman (November 4, 1810 – December 18, 1875) was the founder of Brownsville, Texas, and was part owner of a successful river boat company on the Rio Grande.

== Early life ==
He was born in Wethersfield, Connecticut, United States, to Capt. Francis Stillman and Harriet Stillman (née Robbins). In February 1828, he went by way of New Orleans to Matamoros and established himself as an entrepreneur. He was involved in cotton brokerage and real estate in addition to silver mines in Nuevo León and Tamaulipas.

== Texas and Mexico ==
=== Fort Brown ===
Before the Mexican–American War the United States government was looking to build a permanent fort along the Rio Grande. Charles Stillman, having a deed to the land, offered to lease it to the government to build a fort on. This land was part of the Espiritu Santo land grant, but due to a complication involving the owners not listing the land with the Mexican or Texas government a land dispute ensued which reached the Supreme Court.

=== The founding of Brownsville ===
Charles Stillman founded Brownsville, Texas, on January 13, 1849, around the same time as the establishment of Fort Brown. The land, which was less than a mile from the fort, was also disputed. Stillman had bought large pieces of land north and northeast of Matamoros from the heirs of José Narciso Cavazos. Stillman offered the Cavazos family $33,000 for their land even though it was worth $214,000. The Cavazos family accepted the offer to avoid paying legal fees. However, Stillman never paid the Cavazos family the $33,000 for the land. Since the land belonged to the heirs of his second marriage. This was one of the reasons the Cortina Wars happened.

=== M Kenedy and Co. ===
Charles Stillman started a transport company with Miflin Kenedy and Richard King after the Mexican–American War, under the name of King, Kenedy and Co. The transport company bought up the Government's surplus steam boats which were used to ferry U.S. forces and supplies up the river, from the seaport Los Brazos de Santiago, just 8 miles up the coast from the mouth of the Rio Grande. King, Kenedy and Co. gained a monopoly over river trade until former business partners of Stillman, King and Kenedy's José San Román and John Young started their own river boat venture. Profits were still very high for Kenedy, King and Co. despite competition.

In the 1850s the Cortina Wars started, Juan Cortina, an enemy of Stillman's, led some attacks on the King, Kenedy and Co. fleet, most notably, an attack near Rio Grande City, Texas, but did not disrupt it. Shortly before the Civil War Stillman hired a clerk by the name of Francisco Yturria who would become an instrumental partner in King, Kenedy and Co. during the Civil War. Yturria being born in Matamoros could register boats under Mexico allowing them to fly the Mexican flag. Since Mexico was a neutral country American ships blockading the Texas Coast could not board Stillman's steamboats. Stillman, King and Kenedy arranged for bales of cotton to be sent to Brownsville where it was ferried across the Rio Grande to Matamoros. The Rio Grande could not be blockaded because it was an international border and such a blockade would have caused an incident with the Mexican Government. Despite Union Forces capturing Brownsville in 1863 and 1864, smuggling cotton was still a profitable venture. After the war a rail line from Brownsville to Point Isabel (Port Isabel, Texas was known as Point Isabel during this period) was completed and river traffic dwindled and the company sold its boats to Captain William Kelly.

== Personal life ==
On August 17, 1849, in Wethersfield, Connecticut, he married Elizabeth Pamela Goodrich, also from Wethersfield. Goodrich was the daughter of Deacon Joshua Goodrich and Clarissa Goodrich (née Francis). Together, they had:

- James Stillman (1850–1918), who married Sarah Elizabeth Rumrill, and was the president of the First National City Bank
  - James Alexander Stillman (1873–1944), who married Anne Urquhart Potter. He also served as president of National City Bank of New York
  - Elsie Stillman, who married William Goodsell Rockefeller, a son of William Rockefeller Jr.
  - Isabel Stillman, who married Percy Avery Rockefeller, another son of William Rockefeller Jr.
  - Charles Chauncey Stillman
  - Ernest Goodrich Stillman

After the war, Stillman lived in Brownsville and New York but moved to New York permanently in 1866. Charles Stillman died on December 18, 1875, and was buried in Woodlawn Cemetery in New York.

His great-great-grandson is director Whit Stillman (b. 1952).

=== Legacy ===
Charles Stillman is believed to have named the first three streets in Brownsville after himself, his wife, Elizabeth, and his father, Francis. These Streets are named St. Charles, Elizabeth St. and St. Francis. It is believed that the sign-making company which made the street signs originally misread the order and mistook Street (abbreviated "St.") for Saint (which also is abbreviated "St.").

A middle school in Brownsville, Texas, is named after Stillman.

== Sources ==
- John Mason Hart, "STILLMAN, CHARLES," Handbook of Texas Online (http://www.tshaonline.org/handbook/online/articles/fst57), accessed January 10, 2012. Published by the Texas State Historical Association.
- Vezzetti, Robert B. 1986. Steamboats on the Lower Rio Grande Valley in the 19th Century. Studies in Brownsville History ed. Milo Kearney, 77-80. Brownsville, Texas: Pan American Brownsville U P.
- LeRoy P. Graf, The Economic History of the Lower Rio Grande Valley, 1820–1875 (Ph.D. dissertation, Harvard University, 1942).
- Tom Lea, The King Ranch (2 vols., Boston: Little, Brown, 1957).
- Chauncey Devereux Stillman, Charles Stillman (New York, 1956). Stillman Papers, Harvard and Columbia University libraries.
- John K. Winkler, The First Billion: The Stillmans and the National City Bank (New York: Vanguard, 1934).
- Life of Charles Stillman. (http://www.stillman.org/f1147.htm)
