= George S. Moore =

American businessman (1905–2000)

- Born: April 1, 1905; Hannibal, Missouri, United States
- Died: April 21, 2000 (aged 95); Sotogrande, Spain
- Occupation: Banker
- Known for: Overseas expansion of Citibank
- Spouses: Beatriz Bermejillo y Braniff (m. 1938): Charon C. Moore
- Children: 4

George Stevens Moore (April 1, 1905 – April 21, 2000) was an American banker and business executive who was the chairman of First National City Bank of New York (later Citigroup) from 1967 to 1970.

== Early life and education ==
Moore was born in Hannibal, Missouri, and graduated from Yale University where he made money writing for the Yale Daily News and booking Broadway shows and tours to Europe for his classmates.

== Career ==
In 1927, he joined Farmers' Loan and Trust Company in New York City. The bank would merge with First National City Bank. He was the president of Citibank (the predecessor to Citigroup) from 1959–1967 and later chairman from 1967 to 1970. He was succeeded by Walter B. Wriston who was president from 1967 to 1970.

In 1963, Moore led an early effort by multinational corporations to create the world's first private investment company to promote the economic development of Latin America. This effort led to the formation of the Adela Investment Company in September 1964 and Moore served as a director.

Moore was president of the Metropolitan Opera Association in 1967 and dealt with financial problems as the company entered Lincoln Center. Cost-saving measures included raising ticket prices, delaying the season and eliminating free summer concerts in Central Park.

Moore was the sole representative for financial interests of the Onassis family in the United States.

In 1987, he wrote "The Banker's Life" ISBN 0-393-33151-2 detailing his experiences at the bank.

Moore was inducted into the Junior Achievement U.S. Business Hall of Fame in 1976. The Yale Science and Engineering Association conferred upon him its award for "Meritorious Service to Yale University".

== Personal life ==
He married his first wife, the Spanish-born Beatriz Bermejillo y Braniff, the Marquesada de Mohernando, in Mexico in 1938. From this marriage was born George Bermejillo Moore (1939–2015) who married Katharine Fairfax Lipson, descendant of the Schuyler, Van Renssalear, and Bayard New York families. He married his second wife Charon C. Moore and had three children, Christina Sendagorta, Maria Pia Steven C. Moore.

== Death and legacy ==
He died on April 21, 2000.

Business positions
Preceded by James Stillman Rockefeller	Chairman of Citigroup; 1967–1970	Succeeded by Walter B. Wriston
