= Gordon S. Rentschler =

American businessman (1885–1948)

Gordon Sohn Rentschler
- Born: November 25, 1885; Hamilton, Ohio, U.S.
- Died: March 3, 1948 (aged 62); Havana, Cuba
- Education: Princeton University (1907)
- Employer: First National City Bank
- Title: Chairman
- Relatives: Frederick Brant Rentschler (brother)

Gordon Sohn Rentschler (November 25, 1885 – March 3, 1948) was a chairman of First National City Bank, a predecessor of Citigroup.

== Biography ==
Rentschler was born in Hamilton, Ohio, on November 25, 1885. His father was George A. Rentschler, one of the principals of the Hooven-Owens-Rentschler engine manufacturer. His brother was a Frederick Brant Rentschler.

He graduated as president of the class at Princeton University in 1907 and returned to the family business. Following a flood in 1913 he worked with National City to secure a $35 million bond issue for permanent flood control issues. His actions drew the attention of Charles E. Mitchell who became his patron at the bank.

In 1921, following a collapse of sugar prices in Cuba, he acted on behalf of National City in dealing with the problem (his family interests had been in providing machines for the industry). In 1923 he was offered a directorship at the company at the age of 38—the youngest director in the bank's history at the time. He would commute once a week to New York. In 1925 he left management of his family business for First National. He was elevated to chairman in 1940.

Rentschler died of a heart attack while still chairman of the bank and on trip to Cuba.

Business positions
Preceded by James H. Perkins	Chairman of Citigroup; 1940–1948	Succeeded by William Gage Brady Jr.
