= Charles E. Mitchell =

American banker (1877–1955)

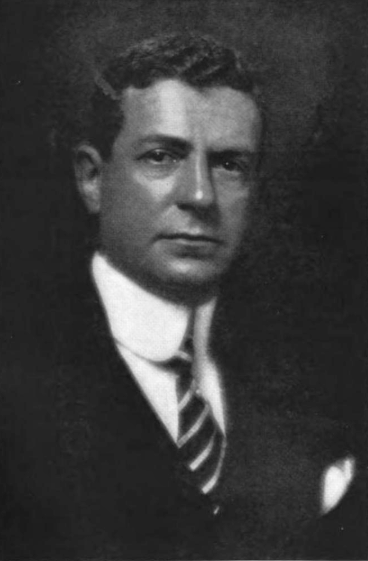
- Born: Charles Edwin Mitchell; October 6, 1877; Chelsea, Massachusetts, U.S.
- Died: December 14, 1955 (aged 78); New York City, U.S.
- Occupation: Banker
- Known for: National City Bank
- Father: George Edwin Mitchell

Charles Edwin Mitchell (October 6, 1877 – December 14, 1955) was an American banker whose incautious securities policies facilitated the speculation which led to the Crash of 1929. His actions as president of the First National City Bank (now Citibank) were a prime factor in the passage of the Glass–Steagall Act.

== Early life and education ==
Mitchell was born in Chelsea, Massachusetts where his father, George Edwin Mitchell, worked for a produce dealer and served as mayor from 1887 until 1888. Mitchell graduated from Amherst College in 1899, after which he got a job with the Western Electric Company in Chicago.

== Career ==
He worked his way from clerk to become assistant manager of Western Electric. In 1907 he moved to New York City, where he became assistant to the president of the Trust Company of America. In June 1908 he married pianist and music patron Elizabeth Rend, daughter of coal merchant William P. Rend, founder of Rendville, Ohio. Between 1911 and 1916, he ran his own investment house, C. E. Mitchell & Company. In 1916, he became vice-president of National City Company, which he reorganized into a private investment banking firm. In 1922, he acquired a former farm in Tuxedo Park, New York, and constructed a mansion designed by Walker & Gillette.

Mitchell was elected president of National City Bank (now Citibank) in 1921 as well as president of National City Company, which became the largest security-issuing entity in the world. He became known as "Sunshine Charley" by the press due to his relentless promotion of buying securities, including shares in the bank to customers and employees. By April 1929, he orchestrated a merger with Farmers' Loan and Trust Company, creating the first bank worth over $2 billion in the USA. At that time he was made chairman of the combined companies, and Gordon S. Rentschler became president of National City Bank.

Later in 1929 he proposed merging National City with the Corn Exchange Bank, which would have made it the largest bank in the world. The deal fell apart after the Wall Street crash of 1929, when share prices of both banks plunged.

His salesmen sold millions of shares in the bank totaling $650 million, much of which would be lost in the crash. Indeed, while the Federal Reserve Bank was attempting to curb speculation earlier in 1929, Mitchell floated a $25 million advance to traders for call money. Under his leadership, the bank expanded rapidly and, by 1930, had 100 branches in 23 countries outside the United States.

== Arrest and acquittal ==
Mitchell remained chairman until 1933, when he was arrested and indicted for tax evasion by then Assistant U.S. Attorney Thomas E. Dewey. Charges were brought following testimony by Mitchell in which he openly stated that he had sold his stake in National City Bank to avoid paying taxes. Defended by attorney Max Steuer, he was found not guilty of all criminal charges, but the government won a million-dollar civil settlement against him. In 1933, the U.S. Senate's Pecora Commission investigated Mitchell as its first witness for his part in tens of millions of dollars in losses, excessive pay, and tax avoidance. In November 1929, U.S. Senator Carter Glass said, "Mitchell more than any 50 men is responsible for this stock crash."

In November 1936, his daughter Rita married George Adam Rentschler, son of Gordon S. Rentschler who was now president of National City.

Mitchell's townhouse on Fifth Avenue, built for him by Walker & Gillette in 1926, with a rusticated facade in the manner of a 16th-century Roman palazzo, now houses the Consulate General of France, New York City. The 108-acre Mitchell estate in Tuxedo Park, included a 25-room mansion, an elaborate stone boathouse, ten-room guest cottage, a nine-room grooms' cottage, and multiple garages and stables. It was reported to have cost over a million dollars to build at the time, but was auctioned off for about $15,200 in 1940.

Business positions
Preceded by James A. Stillman	President/Chairman of National City Bank; 1921–1929 (President with acting duties as Chairman); 1929–1933 (Chairman)	Succeeded by James H. Perkins
