= Jeremiah Thompson =

Jeremiah Thompson (1784–1835) was a New York merchant, ship owner, Quaker, officer in the New York Manumission Society (dedicated to freeing slaves). He was co-founder in 1817 of the famous Black Ball Line together with five other men (four of whom were also Quakers) including Isaac Wright. He emigrated to the United States from his native Yorkshire, England in 1801 at the age of seventeen.

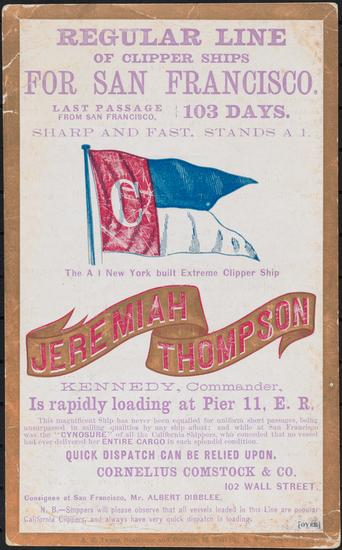
Clipper ship sailing card
