= James A. Stillman =

American businessman (1873–1944)

President of National City Bank
- In office 1919–1921
- Preceded by: Frank A. Vanderlip
- Succeeded by: Charles Edwin Mitchell

Personal details
- Born: James Alexander Stillman; August 18, 1873 New York City, U.S.
- Died: January 13, 1944 (aged 70) New York City, U.S.
- Spouse: Anne Urquhart Potter (m. 1901; div. 1931)
- Children: 5
- Parent(s): James Jewett Stillman; Sarah Elizabeth Rumrill
- Relatives: Charles Stillman (grandfather)
- Education: Harvard University (1896)
- Occupation: Chairman of National City Bank of New York

James Alexander Stillman (August 18, 1873 – January 13, 1944) was a president of National City Bank.

== Biography ==
James Alexander Stillman was born on August 18, 1873, in New York City to James Jewett Stillman (1850–1918) and Sarah Elizabeth Rumrill. His paternal grandfather was Charles Stillman (1810–1875), the founder of Brownsville, Texas. He graduated Harvard University in 1896.

== Career ==
In 1918, his father who was chairman of National City Bank of New York died and the younger Stillman engaged in a fight with Frank A. Vanderlip to control the company. Eventually in 1919, Vanderlip quit and Stillman became chairman. His father's estate was estimated at $45,000,000. While he was chairman, he urged temperate speech and urged people not to do or say anything that causes excitement while discussing general conditions of the country.

He served as chairman for three years until personal issues relating to a divorce with his wife caused him to resign. In 1921, Stillman sold 5,000 city lots in Brownsville, Texas that were part of his grandfather's estate, with estimates putting their value upwards of $1,500,000.

== Personal life ==
In 1901, he married Anne "Fifi" Urquhart Potter at Grace Church in Manhattan. She was the daughter of James Brown Potter. Together they had:

- Anne Stillman (1902–1987), who married Henry P. Davison Jr. (1898–1961), son of Henry Pomeroy Davison.
- James "Bud" Alexander Stillman Jr. (1904–1998), a doctor with the U.S. Army Medical Corps
- Alexander Stillman (1911–1984), a Lieutenant with the U.S. Navy and former assistant cashier of National City Bank
- Guy Stillman (1918–1985), also Lieutenant with the U.S. Navy

In 1921, he filed for divorce accusing his wife of infidelity and saying that her youngest child was the son of a half-blood Indian guide from Quebec, who was the superintendent of the Stillman's property in Grande-Anse. His wife denied the charges and accused him of fathering a child with chorus girl Florence H. Leeds. Stillman later acknowledged his son with Leeds in 1926 by agreeing to give $20,000 a year in trust to their son Jay Ward Leeds until he was 21. At that point, he was to receive $150,000.

After five years, the court refused the divorce saying that he had misbehaved. His wife then filed for divorce but withdrew the contest after receiving a $500,000 necklace. They sailed to Europe to receive counseling from Carl Jung. He eventually acknowledged he was the father of Guy and the court case ended up costing him more than $1 million but they reconciled in 1926. Fifi eventually divorced Stillman in 1931 and married Fowler McCormick, a man twenty years younger than she and a friend of their son, Bud.

He died on January 13, 1944, a few days before he planned to visit his winter home in Havana, Cuba. His estate was split between his four children with a bequest going to his friend, Bernard E. Smith, the executor of his estate.

Business positions
Preceded by Frank A. Vanderlip	President of Citigroup; 1919–1921	Succeeded by Charles E. Mitchell
