= Accolades Card =

The Merrill Accolades American Express Card, previously known as the Bank of America Accolades Card, was the first premium credit card offered by Bank of America. It is targeted exclusively at the bank's "affluent, wealthy and ultra- wealthy clients served through Premier Banking & Investments, The Private Bank of Bank of America and its extension, Family Wealth Advisors."

== Overview ==
The card is notable as it is the bank's foray into a new market segment as well as a product offered as a result of the bank's acquisition of another bank, U.S. Trust, particularly since the larger Bank of America has taken the smaller bank's corporate name in establishing a separate legal entity for the first time in history. The entity's name is U.S. Trust, Bank of America Private Wealth Management.

This card, also called the Bank of America Accolades Card or the Bank of America Accolades American Express Card, is a co-branded card that is accepted by merchants who accept the American Express card.

== History ==
The introduction of the card coincides with Bank of America's acquisition of U.S. Trust, a private bank that caters to those with extremely high assets and income. Traditionally, this banking sector has been dominated by JPMorgan and the large brokerage firm, Morgan Stanley, as well as Citicorp and Goldman Sachs. With the acquisition, the private banking unit of Bank of America will be the largest in the world.

The Accolades card is seen as a tool to enter this market segment. The Wall Street Journal has reported that "the bank has struggled to prove it can cater to wealthy clients with the personalized service offered by some rivals.” “The bank says the Accolades card is its first designed solely for clients of its wealth unit.”

The program is now being managed by Merrill Lynch Wealth Management as part of the Bank of America Corporation. Starting January 30, 2017 Merrill Lynch is discontinuing its Merrill Accolades American Express Card and is replacing it with MERRILL+ Visa Signature credit card. The new cards will begin to ship in November 2016 and will have fairly different set of benefits. The most notable of the changes in benefits is the dropping of the Lounge Club airport card from the benefits. The new card will have no annual fee.

== Charges ==
The annual fee for the Accolades card was $295, however current clients of Bank of America Premier Banking & Investments, Private Bank, and Family Wealth Advisers were qualified to have the annual fee waived each year if they maintained assets greater than $350,000 with BOA and their affiliates.

== Competitors ==
The main competitor in this credit card segment is the American Express Centurion Card, which is black in color. The Luxury Institute's recent survey of customer preferences ranked two American Express Cards in the top two; Centurion Card first and Platinum card second. Special access, unparalleled benefits and enhanced customer experience were cited as the reasons for its high regard among customers as well as justification for the $2,500 annual fee for the Centurion card.

Advertising segments for the new card began in September, 2007. Citigroup reportedly has a competing card planned.

== Benefits ==
It has been reported that card holders will receive points that can be redeemed for luxury vacations, cooking and other lessons, concierge services, and other benefits. However, as of 1 January 2012, the Priority Pass Select program was dropped in the place of the "Lounge Club" program. The airports available have been drastically reduced and many domestic major airports are not on the list at all. Lounge Club is the same company as the Priority Pass program and has access to 350+ airport lounges around the world. Primary card holder will receive 10 free passes each year and is able to purchase additional passes at $27 each.

== See also ==
- The Everything Card
