= Choice (credit card) =

The Choice logo, introduced in 1980, appeared in white on the solid dark blue card, as well as on merchant acceptance signs.

Choice was a credit card test marketed by Citibank in the United States, announced in 1977, and first issued in 1978. It was one of the first cards to offer a cash refund program, and no annual fee. Choice was intended to create a rival to Visa, MasterCard, and American Express, but proved unsuccessful, and was withdrawn in 1987. Citibank has continued to use the "Choice" name on some of its Visa and MasterCard cards.

The card was introduced in 1977, when Citibank bought NAC, a regional credit card based in Baltimore, renaming it Choice. A subsequent campaign in Maryland in 1980 turned the card into a regional success, earning more than one million cardholders in the Baltimore and Washington, DC, area. With a view to nationwide expansion, the test market was expanded to include Colorado.

Despite the success of Sears' Discover Card, which offered many of the same features as Choice when it was introduced in 1985 (such as a rebate on purchases and no annual fee), Citibank decided Choice could not compete with Visa and MasterCard in the longer term, and the card was reissued as a Visa at the end of 1987, aimed at entry level customers and those with poor credit.

It was also said that Citibank's owner, Citicorp, was not willing to accept the eventual estimated costs of establishing another national credit card, after Sears had spent an estimated USD80 million creating its Discover Card. Its fate was similar to that of Citibank's first credit card, the "First National City Charge Service" (or "The Everything Card"), introduced on the East Coast in 1967 to compete with BankAmericard (today's Visa) but which became part of Master Charge (now MasterCard) in 1969.
