= James O. Bloss =

American cotton broker (1847–1918)

James O. Bloss (September 30, 1847 – December 15, 1918) was the president of the New York Cotton Exchange and domestic partner of John William Sterling, founding partner of Shearman & Sterling LLP and major benefactor to Yale University.

== Biography ==
Bloss was a member of a New England family, the progenitor of which, Edmund Bloss or Bloys, became a freeman of Watertown, Mass., in 1639. One of his grandfathers, Joseph Bloss, was a member of the detachment assigned to duty by Washington when the death sentence was executed upon Major John André.

Bloss was the son of James Orville Bloss Sr., and Eliza Ann Lockwood Bloss. He was born in Rochester on September 30, 1847, and after getting a thorough business education went to New York to engage in the cotton trade. In his long career as a cotton merchant he was a member of the firms of Gwathmey & Bloss. James O. Bloss & Company and Woodward & Stillman (with James Stillman).

In 1892, Bloss was elected president of the New York Cotton Exchange and was re-elected the following year. He retired from business several years before dying, although be retained the presidency of the Fidelity Company and a directorship in the Duluth, South Shore & Atlantic Railway Company and had an office at No. 55 Wall Street.

One of his intimate friends was John William Sterling, with whom Bloss lived for more than forty years. Upon the former's death in 1918 he was one of the executors of Sterling's will, which left practically all his estate, valued at around $18,000,000 (equivalent to $385,287,611 in 2025) to Yale University. Bloss never married and died just five months after Sterling.

In many of the published reports of the death of Bloss, reference was made to the unusual, almost unique, friendship that characterized the long-lasting relationship between Sterling and Bloss. Both were bachelors, both were of far more than local reputations, Sterling being one of the most esteemed New York lawyers, and Bloss highly regarded among the world bankers. Sterling was almost taciturn, and excessively devoted to his profession. He sat before his desk every morning, not later than eight o'clock, and was usually the last one in the office to close the desk and go home. Bloss, on the other hand, was very companionable, temperamentally very different from Sterling.

One of the intimate friends of Bloss and Sterling was James Stillman. After the death of James Gordon Bennett Jr. in May 1918, it was learned by the administrators of his estate that he had appointed Stillman one of the administrators and trustees. Stillman had little or no opportunity to act under the authority of Bennett's will, as he had died in March 1918, two months before Bennett's death. Stillman named Sterling one of his executors. Sterling could hardly have begun his duties under Stillman's will when he too died suddenly in July 1918. The Bennett estate, the Stillman estate and the Sterling estate totaled about $76,000,000. After Sterling's death it was learned that he had appointed his long time intimate companion, Bloss, one of the executors. And a few months after Sterling's death, Bloss died.

Bloss died on December 15, 1918, in his room at the Metropolitan Club, New York, where he had been living since October, when he left his summer home at Harrison. In his will Sterling left said that Bloss could be buried in his Woodlawn Cemetery mausoleum: "in case my said friend, James O. Bloss, who has lived with me for more than forty years, should desire to be interred in the said mausoleum and should die without ever having been married." But instead Bloss was buried in Rochester, where he was born.
