= William Gage Brady Jr. =

American businessman (1887–1966)

- Born: December 20, 1887; New York City, U.S.
- Died: October 9, 1966 (aged 78); Memorial Mission Hospital; Asheville, North Carolina, U.S.
- Education: Columbia University (1908)
- Spouse: Marion N. Kennedy

William Gage Brady Jr. (December 20, 1887 – October 9, 1966) was a chairman of the National City Bank of New York, a predecessor of Citibank.

== Biography ==
Brady was born in New York City on December 20, 1887, to William Gage Brady Sr. (1856–1917).

He attended Trinity School and received a B.A. in 1908 from Columbia University.

He married Marion N. Kennedy.

He worked at Bankers Trust until 1914. He then went to work at National City Bank. He was in charge of domestic operations in 1938, president in 1940, and chairman in 1948.

He died on October 9, 1966, at Memorial Mission Hospital in Asheville, North Carolina.

Business positions
Preceded by Gordon S. Rentschler	Chairman of Citigroup; 1948–1952	Succeeded by Howard C. Sheperd
