= Howard C. Sheperd =

American businessman (1894–1980)

Howard Cottrell Sheperd
- Born: October 15, 1894; Vincennes, Indiana, U.S.
- Died: February 17, 1980 (aged 85)
- Education: DePauw University (1917)
- Children: 1

Howard Cottrell Sheperd (October 15, 1894 – February 17, 1980) was chairman of the predecessor to Citibank from 1952 to 1959 and a founder of WNET, the New York City Public Broadcasting Service outlet.

== Biography ==
Sheperd was born on October 15, 1894, in Vincennes, Indiana, to Albert M. Sheperd and Clara S. Burlingame.

He graduated from DePauw University in 1916 after entering a First National City Bank training class. He served in World War I and returned to the bank advancing up the ladder from assistant cashier.

In 1945, his son Howard Cotterill Sheperd Jr., was killed in the Battle of Iwo Jima.

He served as President of The Union League Club from 1946 to 1947.

He was named president and director in 1948 and chairman in 1952. In 1955, National City Bank of New York bought First National Bank of the City of New York to form First National City Bank.

In 1959, he left the company because of mandatory retirement provisions at age 65. At the time of his retirement, the bank was the second largest in the United States.

In 1961, he led a group seeking to acquire WNTA-TV in Newark, New Jersey, to turn it into New York City's first noncommercial educational television station.

He died on February 17, 1980, in Bronxville, New York.

Business positions
Preceded by William Gage Brady Jr.	Chairman of Citigroup; 1952–1959	Succeeded by James Stillman Rockefeller
