= Plumbing (finance) =

Portions of finance system related to capital flows

In finance, plumbing (or financial plumbing), refers to the portions of the financial system that allow for the movement of capital and manage risk. Portions of the global financial system identified as "plumbing" include money markets.

Citibank's "Services" division, responsible for half of the bank's profit, deals primarily with business related to "financial pipes".
