= Richard Parsons (businessman) =

American business executive (1948–2024)

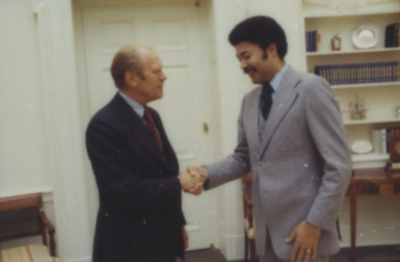
- Parsons (right) with President Gerald Ford in 1976
- Born: Richard Dean Parsons; April 4, 1948; Brooklyn, New York City, U.S.
- Died: December 26, 2024 (aged 76); New York City, U.S.
- Education: University of Hawaiʻi at Mānoa (BA); Albany Law School (JD)

Richard Dean Parsons (April 4, 1948 – December 26, 2024) was an American business executive, notably the chairman of Citigroup and the chairman and CEO of Time Warner. He had also been the interim CEO of the Los Angeles Clippers of the National Basketball Association (NBA) and the interim chairman of the board for CBS.

== Early life ==
Parsons was born to an African-American family in Brooklyn, New York, on April 4, 1948. He was one of five children. His maternal grandfather had been head groundskeeper at the John D. Rockefeller estate, Kykuit. Growing up in the Bedford-Stuyvesant area of Brooklyn, Parsons's father, Lorenzo Locklair Parsons, was an electrical technician and his mother, Isabelle (née Judd) was a homemaker. He skipped a grade in elementary school and another in high school.

Parsons attended the University of Hawaiʻi at Mānoa, where he played varsity basketball. After four years, he was seven credits short of his diploma. However, Parsons discovered that he could get into a law school in New York without a college degree if he scored well enough on his pre-law exams. Parsons was accepted by Albany Law School of Union University, New York, where he earned a Juris Doctor in 1971 and finished at the top of his class.

== Career ==
In 1971, Parsons completed an internship at the New York State Legislature, at which time he was invited to work as a lawyer for the staff of New York Governor Nelson Rockefeller. When Rockefeller was appointed Vice President of the United States, in 1974, Parsons followed him to Washington D.C., where he worked directly with President Gerald Ford. He also met a deputy attorney general, Harold R. Tyler, and one of his aides, a young Rudolph W. Giuliani, with whom he was to be closely associated—supporting Giuliani's New York mayoral campaign and heading his transitional council.

In 1977, Parsons returned to New York and became a partner after only two years at the law firm Patterson Belknap Webb & Tyler; also working at the firm was Giuliani. During his 11 years at the firm, Parsons took on Happy Rockefeller, the widow of Nelson (who had died in 1979), as a high-profile client. In 1988, he was recruited to serve as chief operating officer of the Dime Savings Bank of New York by CEO Harry W. Albright Jr., who was a former Rockefeller aide. Parsons later became chairman and CEO, and oversaw a merger with Anchor Savings Bank, gaining a substantial sum when the Dime Bank was demutualized.

In 1991, on the recommendation of Nelson's brother Laurance Rockefeller to the then-CEO Steve Ross, Parsons was invited to join Time Warner's board. He subsequently became president of the company in 1995, recruited by chief executive Gerald Levin. Parsons helped negotiate the company's merger with America Online in 2000, creating a $165 billion media conglomerate that has been described as the "worst merger of all time." In December 2001, it was announced that Levin would retire and Parsons had been selected as his successor. The announcement surprised some media experts who expected chief operating officer Robert W. Pittman to take the helm. In 2003, Parsons made the announcement of the name change from "AOL Time Warner" to simply "Time Warner". He stepped down as CEO of Time Warner in December 2007.

Parsons was chairman of Citigroup from February 2009 until April 2012, when he was replaced by Michael E. O'Neill. He was chairman of the advisory board of Feigen Advisors, a CEO advisory firm run by Marc Feigen.

In September 2018, Parsons became the interim chairman of the board for CBS, replacing Les Moonves. In October 2018, he stepped down from the position, citing difficulties brought about by his battle with multiple myeloma. Parsons was replaced by Strauss Zelnick.

=== Humanitarian causes ===
In 2007, Parsons became the chairman of the board of directors of the Jazz Foundation of America. He was also Chair of the Apollo Theater Foundation and co-chair of the advisory board of the National Museum of African American History and Culture.

At the American Museum of Natural History, he served on the board of trustees from 2005 to 2012 and then was an Honorary Trustee from 2013 to 2017.

In 2016, Parsons was appointed board chair of the Rockefeller Foundation, a foundation promoting the well-being of humanity all over the world. He joined the foundation's board of trustees in 2008.

=== Prominent connections ===
From the early 1980s through much of the 1990s, Parsons owned a house near the Rockefeller family estate in Pocantico Hills, where his grandfather was once a groundskeeper. For a brief time, he worked for Nelson Rockefeller at the family office, "Room 5600", at Rockefeller Center.

Parsons became chairman emeritus of the Partnership for New York City, established by David Rockefeller in 1979. He became an advisory trustee of the family's principal philanthropy, the Rockefeller Brothers Fund, and he sat with David Rockefeller on the board of the World Trade Center Memorial Foundation. Parsons was also on the board of the family-created Museum of Modern Art.

In 2001, United States President George W. Bush selected Parsons to co-chair a commission on Social Security. Parsons also worked on the transition team for Michael Bloomberg, who was elected Mayor of New York City in 2001. In 2006, Parsons was selected to co-chair the transition team for the incoming governor of New York, Eliot Spitzer.

In August 2006, an article in New York Magazine reported that Parsons would likely run for Mayor of New York City in the 2009 New York mayoral election. However, Parsons repeatedly denied the reports.

Parsons was a member of the economic advisory team for President Barack Obama. He met with the then President-elect Obama in November 2008, along with other economic experts, to discuss measures to solve the economic crisis. After New Mexico Governor Bill Richardson withdrew his name from consideration for the position of Secretary of Commerce in the Obama administration, Parsons's name was floated as a possible nominee.

In May 2014, in the wake of the Donald Sterling racial remarks controversy, it was announced that Richard Parsons was appointed the interim CEO of the Los Angeles Clippers.

== Personal life and death ==
In 1968, Parsons married Laura Ann Bush, a community activist with a doctorate in child psychology, whom he met at the University of Hawaii at Manoa. They had three children.

In 2015, Parsons was diagnosed with multiple myeloma, a rare form of blood cancer. Though he went into remission after stem-cell therapy, complications in 2018 caused him to step down from his role as interim chairman of the board of CBS.

Parsons died in New York City on December 26, 2024, at the age of 76. According to his friend Ronald S. Lauder, the cause of Parsons's death was bone cancer.

Business positions
Preceded by Gerald Levin	Chief executive officer of Time Warner; 2002–2007	Succeeded by Jeffrey Bewkes
Preceded by Winfried Bischoff	Chairman of Citigroup; 2009–2012	Succeeded by Michael O'Neill
