= Michael E. O'Neill =

American businessman (born 1946)

- Born: October 31, 1946 (age 79); Santa Monica, California, U.S.
- Education: Princeton University (B.A.); University of Virginia (MBA)
- Occupation: Business executive
- Known for: Chairman of Citigroup (2012–2019)

Michael E. O'Neill (born October 31, 1946) is an American business executive. He served as chairman of Citigroup from 2012 to 2019.

== Early life and education ==
O'Neill was born in Santa Monica, California, and spent much of his early life in Asia and Europe. He graduated from Princeton University with a Bachelor of Arts Degree in European Civilization in 1969 and served as a lieutenant in the Marines between 1969 and 1971. He received an MBA in 1974 from the University of Virginia.

== Career ==
In 1974, O’Neill joined Continental Illinois. He moved to First Interstate Capital Markets in 1984 and returned to Continental in 1989 to manage its mergers and acquisitions advisory business, becoming CFO in 1992. After Continental was acquired by BankAmerica, he became head of its global equity investments division from 1994 to 1995. From 1995 to 1999 he was BankAmerica's CFO.

In 1999 he became chief executive of Barclays Bank but resigned after two months because he had developed an arrhythmic heartbeat. From 2000 to 2004 he was chairman and CEO of Bank of Hawaii.

In 2009 he became a member of Citigroup's board of directors, and in September 2011, he became chairman of the bank's Citibank NA division, and was named chairman in March 2012. He retired in 2019.

=== Resignation of Vikram Pandit ===
On October 16, 2012, then CEO Vikram Pandit unexpectedly resigned and was replaced by Michael Corbat. The New York Times later identified O'Neill as the driving force behind a months-long secret effort to oust Pandit, which culminated in a surprise ultimatum to Pandit stating that he must resign immediately, resign at the end of the year, or be fired. His resignation followed multiple payouts to investors during ongoing fraud allegations.

Business positions
Preceded by Richard Parsons	Chairman of Citigroup; 2012–2019	Succeeded by John C. Dugan
