= James H. Perkins =

American banker (1876–1940)

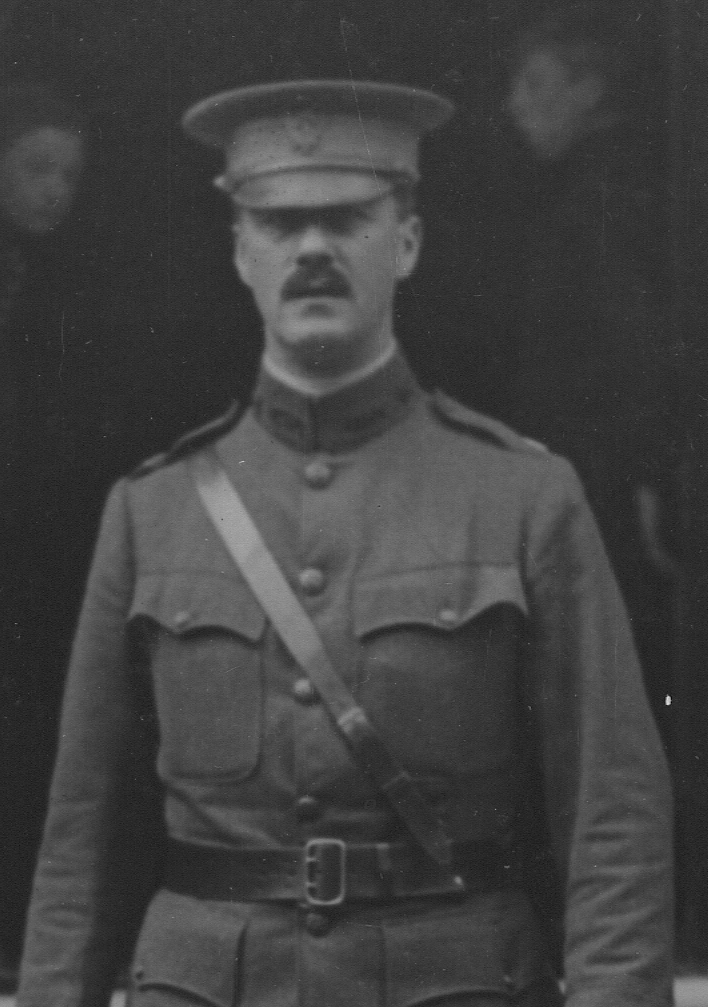
- Perkins, c. 1917–1918
- Born: James Handasyd Perkins; January 11, 1876; Milton, Massachusetts, U.S.
- Died: July 12, 1940 (aged 64); Mount Kisco, New York, U.S.
- Spouse: Alice Mandell Stone

James Handasyd Perkins (January 11, 1876 – July 12, 1940) was an American banker who was chairman of National City Bank until his death in 1940.

== Biography ==
Perkins was born in Milton, Massachusetts, on January 11, 1876, to Edward Cranch Perkins and Jane Sedgwick Watson.

He attended the Milton Academy and graduated from Harvard University in 1898. He was with the Walter Baker chocolate company in hometown until 1905. He moved to American Trust Company in Boston and then to National Commercial Bank in Albany, New York, where he was president in 1912 and 1914 when he moved to National City Bank as a vice president.

Perkins served in France during World War I. After the war he joined Montgomery & Co. In 1921, he was elected president of Farmers' Loan and Trust Company. Farmers merged with National City Bank in 1929 and he became president of the new bank. He became chairman in 1933. In attempts to keep the bank afloat during the Great Depression par value was cut by 40 percent and $50 million in preferred stock was sold to the Reconstruction Finance Corporation.

He died of a heart attack while still chairman shortly after having dinner with Arthur M. Anderson in Mount Kisco, New York.

Business positions
Preceded by Charles E. Mitchell	Chairman of Citigroup; 1933–1940	Succeeded by Gordon S. Rentschler
