= Isaac Wright (investor) =

American Quaker investor (1760–1832)

Isaac Wright (1760–1832) was an American Quaker investor who established the first scheduled trans-Atlantic shipping service between New York and England, and was a president of City National Bank from 1827 to 1832.

Wright was born in East Norwich, Long Island on March 2, 1760, to John Wright, a blacksmith, and Phoebe Seaman (7 March 1733/34 – April 18, 1828), the daughter of Thomas Seaman. (An article in Harper's incorrectly identified him as English.)

In 1817 Isaac and his son William founded the Black Ball Line along with merchants Francis Thompson (who married Isaac's daughter Mary) and Benjamin Marshall. The line, which had ships sailing once a month between New York City and Liverpool, was the first regularly scheduled shipping route in the United States.

Up until that time ships sailed when they pleased. The advent of the regular schedule contributed heavily to New York becoming the dominant port in the United States.

At the time, he lived at 8th Street and Third, and walked back and forth to the South Street Seaport.

Wright speculated on cotton and ended up losing the company to Jeremiah Thompson.

In 1825 he was among the new owners of City National Bank. Other Quaker merchants at the bank were William W. Fox, who would later become president of New York Gas Light Company, and Black Ball founder Benjamin Marshall.

He died of cholera on August 9, 1832, in the bank.

Business positions
Preceded by Thomas L. Smith	President of City National Bank; 1827–1832	Succeeded by Thomas Bloodgood
