= List of chairmen of Citigroup =

The following is a list of chairmen and presidents of what is now Citigroup—the person or persons who were ultimately responsible for the company since its founding in 1812. The highest office in the company was the president until 1909, when James J. Stillman became the first chairman.

== Presidents ==
Name	Portrait	Start year	End year	Notes
Samuel Osgood		1812	1813	City Bank of New York
William Few		1813	1817	
Peter Staff		1817	1825	
Thomas L. Smith		1825	1827	
Isaac Wright		1827	1832	
Thomas Bloodgood		1832	1844	
Gorham A. Worth		1844	1856	
Moses Taylor		1856	1882	National City Bank after 1865 - telegraph lines referred to it as "Citibank"
Percy Pyne		1882	1891	
James Stillman		1891	1909	
Frank A. Vanderlip		1909	1919	
James A. Stillman		1919	1921	
Charles E. Mitchell		1921	1929	
Gordon S. Rentschler		1929	1940	
William Gage Brady Jr.		1940	1948	
Howard C. Sheperd		1948	1952	
James Stillman Rockefeller		1952	1959	
George S. Moore		1959	1967	

== Chairmen ==
Name	Portrait	Start year	End year	Notes
James Stillman		1909	1918	The chairman position was not filled between 1918 (Stillman's death) and 1929. Duties were handled by the president, who acted on an interim basis.
Charles E. Mitchell		1929	1933	
James H. Perkins		1933	1940	
Gordon Sohn Rentschler		1940	1948	
William Gage Brady, Jr.		1948	1952	
Howard C. Sheperd		1952	1959	First National City Bank of New York after 1955
James Stillman Rockefeller		1959	1967	First National City Bank after 1962
George S. Moore		1967	1970	First National City Corporation in 1968
Walter B. Wriston		1970	1984	Citicorp in 1974
John S. Reed		1984	2000	Co-chair of Citigroup after 1998
Sanford I. Weill		1998	2006	Co-chair 1998–2000
Charles Prince		2006	2007	Operating as Citi in 2007
Robert Rubin		2007	2007	November 4 – December 11, 2007
Winfried Bischoff		2007	2009	
Richard Parsons		2009	2012	
Michael E. O'Neill		2012	2019	Began April 2012; retired on January 1 2019
John Dugan		2019	2025	
Jane Fraser		2025	Incumbent	Both chair and CEO
