= John S. Reed =

American businessman

John Shepard Reed
- Born: February 7, 1939 (age 87); Chicago, Illinois, US
- Education: Washington and Jefferson College, MIT Sloan School of Management
- Occupations: Former CEO, Citigroup; Chairman, Massachusetts Institute of Technology board of trustees

John Shepard Reed (born February 7, 1939) is the former chairman of the New York Stock Exchange. He previously was chairman and CEO of Citicorp, Citibank, and post-merger, Citigroup. He is the past chairman of the Massachusetts Institute of Technology's board of trustees.

== Biography ==
He was born in Chicago, Illinois, to Calvin Francis Reed and Virginia (Shepard) Reed. He was raised in Argentina and Brazil. Reed earned his undergraduate degrees in a 3-2 program from Washington and Jefferson College (W&J) and Massachusetts Institute of Technology (MIT), earning a B.S. from the MIT Sloan School of Management in 1961. He was also a member of Lambda Chi Alpha fraternity while at W&J and MIT. He served two years in the U.S. Army before returning to get his master's degree in management from the MIT Sloan School of Management in 1965.

Reed was heavily responsible for pushing for the adoption of the ATM around the US, and led Citicorp through a perilous period in the early 1990s. He was approached by Sandy Weill to merge with Travelers Group a year before the Gramm-Leach-Bliley Act of 1999 (repealing the Glass–Steagall Act of 1933), allowing banking, insurance and securities companies to merge. The result was Citigroup, where Reed was later ousted in a management shakeup with Weill. Reed's departure was announced in a 28 February 2000 press release. In the aftermath of the November 2008 federal bailout of Citigroup, Reed was described as deeply skeptical of the "Wall Street financial engineering" that led to its collapse and "committed to consumer banking and sound commercial underwriting".

Reed was asked to be interim CEO of the New York Stock Exchange after the Richard Grasso over-compensation scandal. He accepted the job for a $1 salary and set up new governance rules as the NYSE became a public corporation.

Reed was a member of both the American Academy of Arts and Sciences and the American Philosophical Society.

Reed was the chairman of the Massachusetts Institute of Technology's Corporation (board of trustees) from 2010 through 2014.

He was a longtime member of the board of directors of Altria Group (and predecessor Phillip Morris Companies) through his retirement in 2008.

He became member of the board of directors of CaixaBank in 2011. In February 2016, he was elected president of the board of Boston Athenaeum.

Reed has four children from his first marriage. In 1994, he married Cindy McCarthy, who was a flight attendant on Citicorp's corporate aircraft.

== Strategic planning ==
Reed's expectation that his business managers be able to present their proposed business strategies in a few presentation slides without excessive use of data and documentation is referenced by business writers W. Chan Kim and Renée Mauborgne in a Harvard Business Review publication.

Business positions
Preceded by Walter B. Wriston	Chairman of Citicorp/Citigroup; 1984–1998 (Citicorp); 1998–2000 (co-Chairman of Citigroup)	Succeeded by Sanford I. Weill
Preceded by Richard Grasso	Chairman of the New York Stock Exchange; 2003–2005	Succeeded by Marsh Carter
