= Gorham A. Worth =

American businessman (1783–1856)

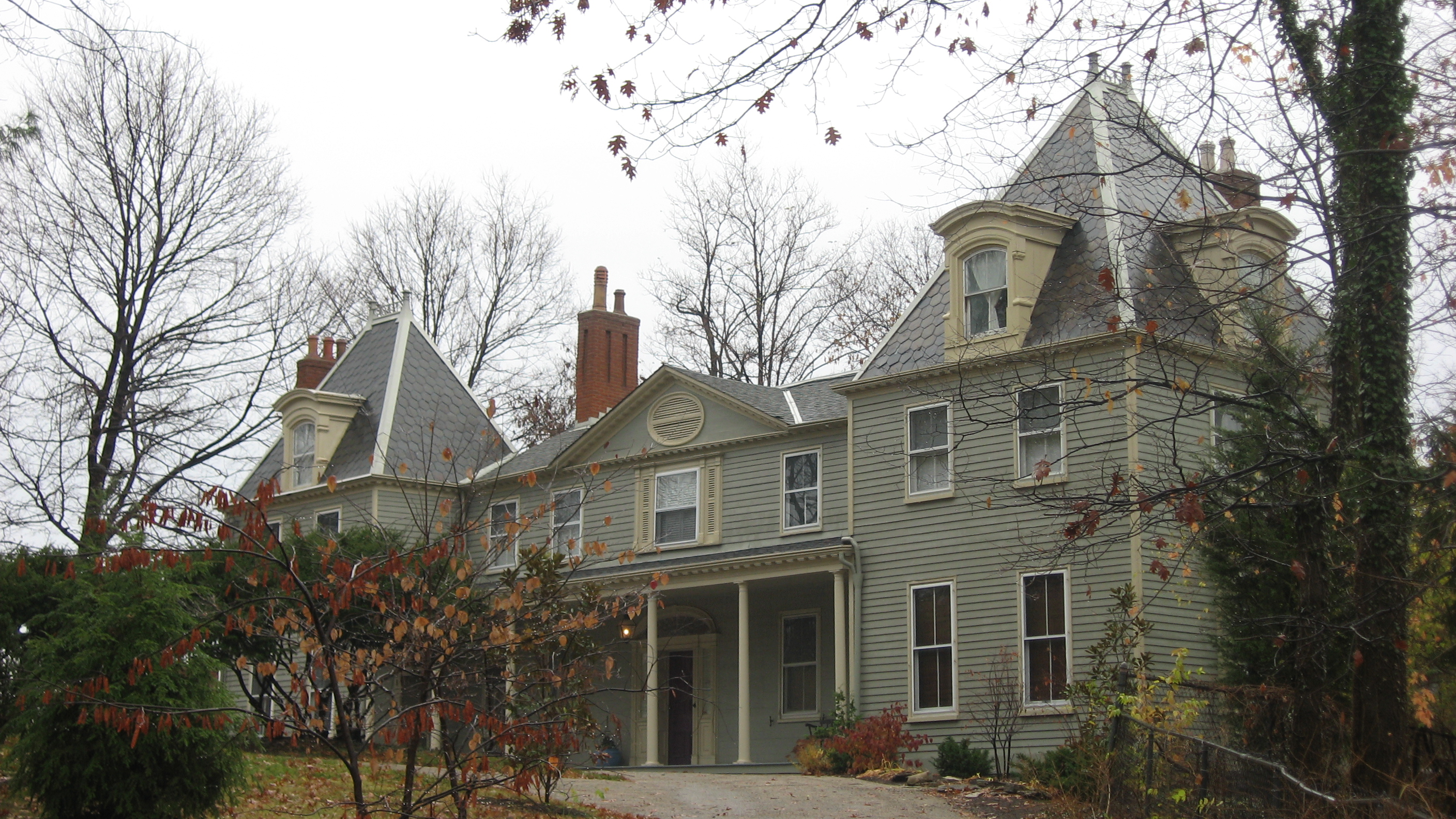
Worth's house in Cincinnati

Gorham A. Worth (1783 – April 3, 1856) was a president of City National Bank.

Worth was born in Hudson, New York. His father Thomas Worth had been among the founders of the community. It is a common mistake, repeated here and there, that his brother was General William Jenkins Worth; William Jenkins Worth was his cousin.

He was a clerk of the Bank of Hudson, a cashier of the Mechanics and Farmers Bank of Albany, cashier of the United States Branch Bank in Cincinnati, Ohio. He moved to New York as a cashier of Tradesman Bank and then to City National in 1825 and was named president in 1844.

His home in Cincinnati is on the National Register of Historic Places.

Business positions
Preceded by Thomas Bloodgood	President of City National Bank; 1844–1856	Succeeded by Moses Taylor
