= Thomas Bloodgood =

American bank president

Thomas Bloodgood (died 1843) was a president of City National Bank.

Bloodgood was born in Flushing, New York, and was a member of the Bloodgood family dating back to Dutch ownership of New York. He was also a wine merchant at the Fulton Market and owned a nursery in Flushing.

Business positions
Preceded by Isaac Wright	President of City National Bank; 1832–1843	Succeeded by Gorham A. Worth
