= John William Sterling =

American lawyer (1844–1918)

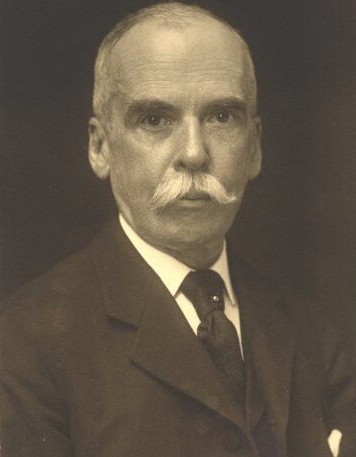
- Born: May 12, 1844; Stratford, Connecticut
- Died: July 5, 1918 (aged 74); Grand-Métis, Quebec, Canada
- Resting place: Woodlawn Cemetery; 40.889°N 73.8734°W
- Education: Yale University (BA); Columbia University (LLB, MA)
- Occupation: Lawyer
- Known for: Co-founder of Shearman & Sterling; bequest of $18 million to Yale University

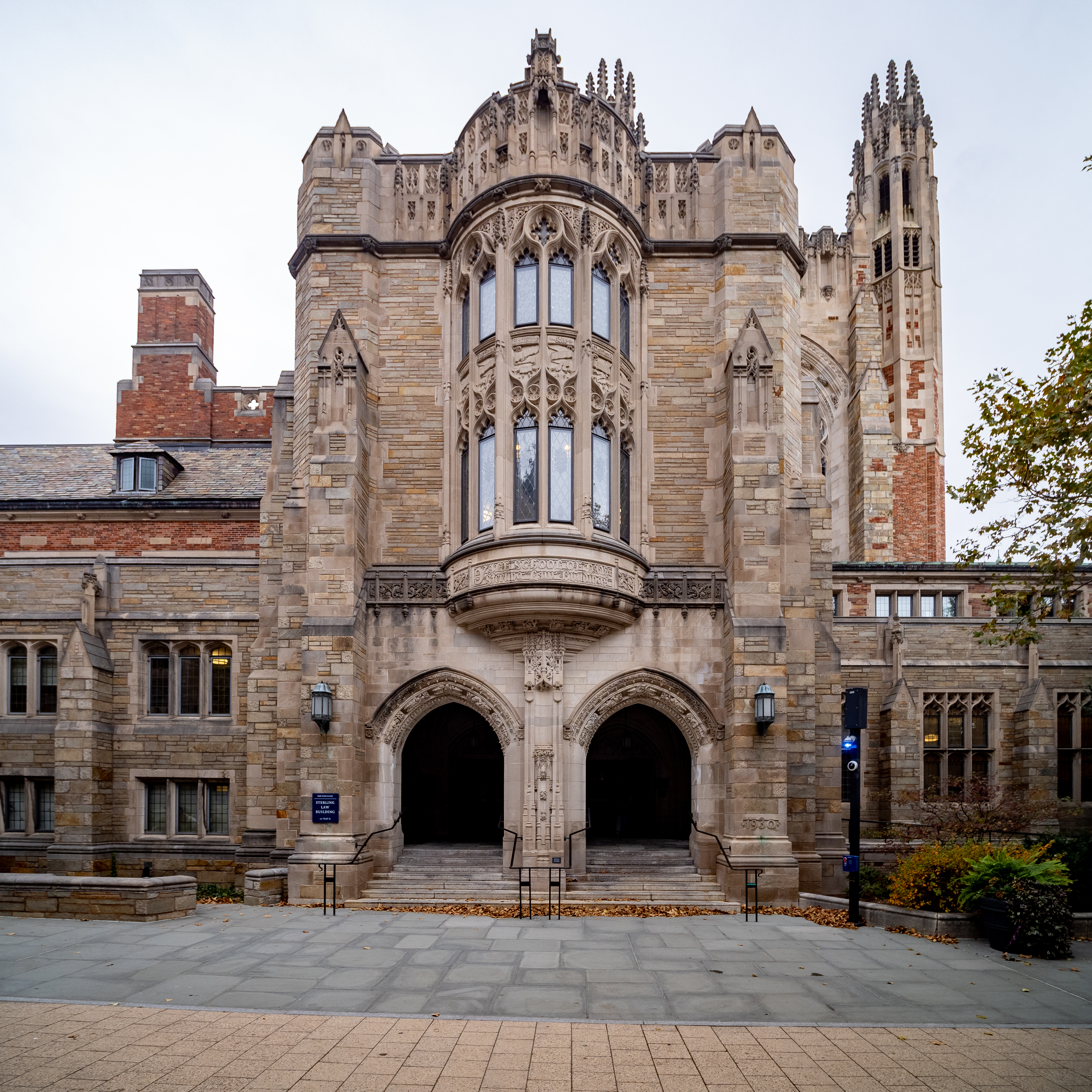
Sterling Law Building at Yale Law School

John William Sterling (May 12, 1844 – July 5, 1918) was a founding partner of Shearman & Sterling LLP and major benefactor to Yale University.

== Early life and career ==
John William Sterling was born in Stratford, Connecticut, the son of Catherine Tomlinson (Plant) and John William Sterling. He graduated from Yale University with a B.A. in 1864 and was a member of Skull and Bones and president of Brothers in Unity during his senior year. He graduated from Columbia Law School as the valedictorian of the class of 1867 and was admitted to the bar in that year. He obtained an M.A. degree in 1874. He became a corporate lawyer in New York City, and in 1871 helped found the law firm of Shearman & Sterling, which represented Jay Gould, Henry Ford, the Rockefeller family, and Standard Oil.

On his death in 1918, Sterling left a residuary estate of $18 million to Yale, at the time the "largest sum of money ever donated to an institution of higher learning in history"—equivalent to $385,287,611 in 2025. He required Yale to fund "at least one enduring, useful and architecturally beautiful building, which will constitute a fitting Memorial of my gratitude to and affection for my alma mater" and "the foundation of Scholarships, Fellowships or Lectureships, the endowment of new professorships and the establishment of special funds for prizes"—these mandates led to the construction of the Sterling Memorial Library, Sterling Law Building, the Hall of Graduate Studies, and the Sterling Hall of Medicine, and the endowment of the Sterling Professorships.

== Personal life ==
Sterling never married. In 2003, historian Jonathan Ned Katz uncovered evidence that Sterling lived for nearly fifty years in a same-sex intimate partnership with cotton broker James O. Bloss.

== Death ==
Sterling died July 5, 1918, while staying at the fishing lodge of Lord Mount Stephen in Grand-Métis, Quebec; he is entombed at Woodlawn Cemetery.

Sterling's sister Cordelia donated the Sterling House and its surrounding estate—part of the Sterling Homestead—to Stratford, Connecticut.
