= Marc Feigen =

American business executive

Marc A. Feigen is an American business executive. As the CEO of Feigen Advisors, he primarily advises CEOs in the Fortune 200, while training and educating new CEOs for the chief executive role. Considered "America's leading coach for CEOs," Feigen has guided more than 35 chief executives of global companies, including Disney, Ford, and Netflix. He is an expert on CEO succession, recommending that corporate board members be proactively prepared to find new CEOs.

Feigen Advisors publishes the annual “New CEO Report,” which profiles new S&P 250 CEOs and has been cited in Fortune, HuffPost, and other news outlets. The chairman of the firm's Advisory Board was Richard Parsons, the former chairman of Citigroup and the former chairman and CEO of Time Warner.

A Harvard Business Review contributor, Feigen is quoted in The Wall Street Journal as an expert on corporate management. Feigen advocates for companies to groom and choose more female CEOs, and for companies to consider co-CEOs as a way of "doubling capacity." His research, published in Harvard Business Review, showed that co-CEOs delivered nearly 40 percent higher shareholder returns than the industry average across 87 public companies. In March 2024, The Wall Street Journal reported that then-Netflix CEO (and current executive chairman) Reed Hastings enlisted Feigen for succession planning help. According to Australian Financial Review, Feigen spent months with co-CEO Greg Peters (who was COO at the time) training him to co-lead Netflix.

Stephen J. Dubner, co-author of the Freakonomics book series, has called Feigen "an evangelist for co-CEOs." In September 2023, Feigen appeared on Freakonomics Radio as an expert on the conditions that help predict whether co-CEOs and other business leaders will succeed.

In 2017, Fortune profiled Feigen's work as a CEO advisor, calling him "the CEO whisperer" and sharing five of his management lessons. The story praises Feigen for "lift[ing] the role of C-suite counselor to an entirely new dimension." That same year, Feigen appeared on Wharton Business Radio to discuss the 2016 New CEO Report. He also published an op-ed column in Investor's Business Daily explaining the report's key findings.

== Other activities ==
Feigen is the Executive Vice Chairman and co-founder of Cambridge in America. He is also an Honorary Fellow at St John’s College (University of Cambridge) and co-chair of Every Vote Counts' executive board.

Feigen teaches a course on the CEO's role at the Cambridge Judge Business School. He also serves on the board of the Social Science Research Council.

== Education ==
Feigen is a graduate of the University of Pennsylvania (B.A. with honors, History); Cambridge University, (M.Phil., International Relations); and the Harvard Business School (MBA).

== Personal life ==
Feigen has two daughters: Julia and Annabel.

== Publications ==
- "Dick Parsons: A Tribute To A Man Of Principle And Honor." Black Enterprise, 2025
- "Is It Time to Consider Co-CEOs?" Harvard Business Review, 2022
- "Look to Military History for Lessons in Crisis Leadership." Harvard Business Review, 2020
- "The CEO's Guide to Retirement." Harvard Business Review, 2018
- "The Boardroom's Quiet Revolution." Harvard Business Review, 2014
- "Ensuring CEO Succession Ability in the Boardroom" chapter in The Talent Management Handbook, McGraw Hill, 2011
- Real Change Leaders, Times Books, 1996
