= Guy Ward Mallon =

American lawyer

Guy Ward Mallon (died December 24, 1933) was an Ohio lawyer and politician. His father, Patrick Mallon, was a judge in the Common Pleas Court in Cincinnati. Guy Mallon graduated from Yale University. In 1885, and received a law degree from Cincinnati Law School in 1888. He subsequently studied at Heidelberg University in Germany. He was elected to the Ohio state legislature in 1889 for one term, after which he began to practice law, working in his father's office. He was elected to the Cincinnati City Council at this time and stayed on the council for sixteen years.

Mallon was involved in attempts to change the Cincinnati election system, and was one of the founders of the "Birdless Ballot League", which lobbied for nonpartisan elections. Books written by Mallon include Can We Escape and Banker vs. Consumer, both of which concerned the U.S. economy. He died of a heart attack on December 24, 1933. He had eight children, including Patrick Mallon, who was United States Vice Consul at Leipzig in Germany at the time of his father's death.
