= Walter Wriston =

Influential New York banker (1919 – 2005)

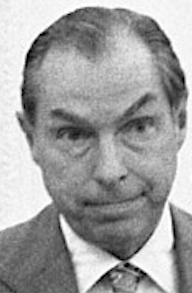
- Born: August 3, 1919; Middletown, Connecticut, U.S.
- Died: January 19, 2005 (aged 85); Manhattan, New York City, New York, U.S.
- Education: Wesleyan University (BA); Tufts University (MA)
- Occupations: Banker; Chairman
- Known for: Chairman and CEO of Citicorp (1967–1984)

Walter Bigelow Wriston (August 3, 1919 – January 19, 2005) was an American banker and former chairman and CEO of Citicorp. As chief executive of Citibank / Citicorp (later Citigroup) from 1967 to 1984, Wriston was widely regarded as the single most influential commercial banker of his time.

During his tenure as CEO, the bank introduced, among other innovations, automated teller machines, interstate banking, the negotiable certificate of deposit, and "pursued the credit card business in a way that no other bank was doing at the time". With then New York Governor Hugh Carey and investment banker Felix Rohatyn, Wriston helped save New York City from bankruptcy in the mid-1970s by setting up the Financial Control Board and the Municipal Assistance Corporation, and persuading the city's union pension funds and banks to buy the latter corporation's bonds.

== Early life and career ==
Wriston was born in Middletown, Connecticut, to Ruth Bigelow Wriston, a chemistry teacher, and Henry Wriston, a history professor at Wesleyan University who was later president of Lawrence College and Brown University.

Wriston attended grade school and high school in Appleton, Wisconsin. Reared as a traditional Methodist, he was not allowed to listen to the radio or go to the movie theater on Sundays. Wriston was an Eagle Scout and recipient of the Distinguished Eagle Scout Award.

He attended Wesleyan University, where he received a Bachelor of Arts degree in 1941. While there, he was a member of the Eclectic Society and received the "Parker Prize" ("Awarded to a sophomore or junior who excels in public speaking"). He received a Master's Degree from Tufts University's Fletcher School of Law and Diplomacy in 1942.

After graduate school, Wriston became a junior Foreign Service officer at the State Department, where he helped negotiate the exchange of Japanese interned in the United States for Americans held prisoner in the Empire of Japan. Drafted into the U.S. Army in 1942, he served in the U.S. Army for four years, being with the Signal Corps on Cebu in the Philippines during his service.

== Politics ==
Wriston was an opponent of John F. Kennedy, stating "Who is this upstart President interfering with the free flow of capital?"

Wriston was twice offered the job of Secretary of the Treasury, once by Richard Nixon and once by Gerald Ford, but turned down both offers. One report is that Wriston declined the offers because these were not made to him personally by the then-President. Wriston also would have had to take a substantial pay cut had he accepted the government position.

He served as Chairman of The Business Council in 1981 and 1982. From 1982 to 1989, Wriston was chairman of President Ronald Reagan's Economic Policy Advisory Board.

== Awards and honors ==
In 1987, the Manhattan Institute of Policy Research initiated a lecture series in honor of Wriston.

In 2004, the Idea Channel organized a seven-part series of interviews with him.

In June 2004, Wriston was awarded the Presidential Medal of Freedom, the nation's highest civil honor, by President George W. Bush.

== Personal life ==
In 1942, Walter Wriston married Barbara Brengle, with whom he had one daughter. Two years after her death in 1966, he married lawyer and businesswoman Kathryn Dineen.

Wriston died on January 19, 2005, in Manhattan, New York City, New York, at the age of 85.

== Legacy ==
Wriston's papers, including the text of hundreds of speeches and articles spanning his lengthy career, are at Tufts University's Archives. Many have been digitized and are available in the Tufts Digital Library.

== Quotes ==
- Capital goes where it's welcome and stays where it's well treated.
- Information about money has become almost as important as money itself
- Countries don't go bust
- The 800 number and the piece of plastic have made time and space obsolete
- The Eurodollar market exists in London because people believe that the British government is not about to close it down
- It is inconceivable that any major bank would walk away from any subsidiary of its holding company. If your name is on the door, all of your capital funds are going to be behind it in the real world. Lawyers can say you have separation, but the marketplace is persuasive, and it would not see it that way.

== Books ==
- The Twilight of Sovereignty (1992)
- Risk and Other Four-Letter Words (1986)
- Bits, Bytes and Balance Sheets (2007)

== See also ==
- List of Chief Executives of Citigroup
- List of Presidential Medal of Freedom recipients

Business positions
| Preceded by George S. Moore | Chairman of Citicorp; 1970–1984 | Succeeded by John S. Reed |
