= Pyne =

Pyne is a surname. Notable people with the surname include:

- Bernard Pyne Grenfell
- Chris Pyne
- Christopher Pyne
- Douglas Pyne
- Frederick Pyne
- Ganesh Pyne
- George Pyne (disambiguation), multiple people
- James Baker Pyne
- James Kendrick Pyne
- Jim Pyne
- Joe Pyne
- John Pyne
- Ken Pyne, British cartoonist
- Louisa Pyne (1832–1904), English soprano and opera company manager
- Lydia V. Pyne (born 1979), American writer and historian of science
- Moses Taylor Pyne
- Natasha Pyne
- Parker Pyne
- Percy Pyne
- Percy Rivington Pyne (disambiguation)
- Richard Pyne
- Rob Pyne
- Robert Allan Pyne
- Stephen J. Pyne
- Tom Pyne
- Valentine Pyne, master gunner of England, Royalist
- William Henry Pyne

== See also ==
- Pyne (Indian surname)
- Arthur Pyne O'Callaghan
- Percy Rivington Pyne House
- Upton Pyne apple
- Jonathan Pyne House
- Pyne's Ground-plum
- Parker Pyne Investigates
- Pyne Mine
- Pyne Glacier
- Pynes Town District
- Upton Pyne
