= Archibald D. Russell =

American financer and philanthropist

- Born: May 28, 1853; New York City, New York, U.S.
- Died: November 27, 1919 (aged 66); New York City, New York, U.S.
- Occupations: Financier, philanthropist
- Employer(s): Brown Bros. & Co. Russell, Robinson & Roosevelt
- Spouse: Albertina Taylor Pyne (m. 1884; died 1918)
- Children: 5
- Parents: Archibald Russell (father); Helen Rutherfurd Watts (mother)
- Relatives: William Hamilton Russell (brother); James Russell (grandfather)

Archibald Douglas Russell (May 28, 1853 – November 27, 1919) was an American financier and philanthropist.

== Early life ==
Russell was born on May 28, 1853, in New York City and as a child, lived there and at his parents' summer home in Princeton, New Jersey. He was a son of Helen Rutherfurd (née Watts) Russell (1815–1906) and Archibald Russell (1811–1871), who was born in Edinburgh, Scotland, and became a lawyer after studying law with Sir Patrick Fraser Tytler and emigrated to the United States in 1836. Among his siblings were Anna Watts Russell (wife of Henry Lewis Morris), Eleanor Elliott Russell (wife of Arthur John Peabody, nephew of George Peabody), John Watts Russell, and architect William Hamilton Russell. His father was also a founder of the American Geographical Society and the Ulster County Savings Institution, near where Russell had his country seat in Ulster County.

His paternal grandparents were Eleanor (née Oliver) Russell and Dr. James Russell, a former president of the Royal Society of Edinburgh. His mother was the only surviving child of his maternal grandparents, Dr. John Watts and Anna (née Rutherfurd) Watts (daughter of U.S. Senator John Rutherfurd). Through his maternal grandfather, he was a great-grandson of Robert Watts (son of John Watts and brother of U.S. Representative John Watts) and Lady Mary Alexander (daughter of William Alexander, Lord Stirling).

He was educated at private schools in New York before entering the business world.

== Career ==
Russell began his career with Brown Bros. & Co., the established banking firm founded by George Brown in 1818. He later went into partnership, as the senior member, with Douglas Robinson Jr. (husband of Corinne Roosevelt Robinson) and Elliott Roosevelt (father of Eleanor Roosevelt), as Russell, Robinson & Roosevelt, a banking and real estate firm. Douglas and Elliott were the brother-in-law and brother of President Theodore Roosevelt.

He served as the third president, succeeding Morris K. Jessup, of the Five Points House of Industry, of which his father was a founder and the first president.

Russell served as a director of the Farmers' Loan and Trust Company, the Delaware and Hudson Railroad Company, the Title Guarantee and Trust Company, the Greenwich Savings Bank, the United New Jersey Railroad and Canal Company, the Princeton University Press, and the University Power Company. He also served as a trustee of Princeton University, a vestryman of Trinity Church, Princeton, the domestic corresponding secretary of the American Geographic Society, and a member of the board of governors of the New York Institute.

== Personal life ==
In 1884, Russell was married to Albertina Taylor Pyne (1859–1918), a daughter of Albertina (née Taylor) Pyne and the English-born Percy Rivington Pyne, the president of National City Bank. Her two brothers were Percy Rivington Pyne II and Moses Taylor Pyne and her grandfather was Moses Taylor, an early president of National City Bank. Together, they were the parents of five children, four of whom survived to adulthood:

- Percy Rivington Pyne Russell (1885–1895), who died aged 9 years and 6 months, in Rome in February 1895.
- Ethelberta Pyne Russell (1887–1952), who married physical chemist Marion Eppley in 1909.
- Archibald Douglas Russell Jr. (1890–1968), who married Mariette Andrews Doolittle, daughter of Julius T. A. Doolittle of Utica, New York, and niece of Judge Alfred Conkling Coxe Sr.
- Helen Rutherfurd Russell (b. 1897), who married R. Lawrence Benson in 1919. After his death, she married Joseph S. Clements in 1938.
- Constance Rivington Russell (1899–1983), who married John Gilbert Winant, later the Governor of New Hampshire and U.S. Ambassador to the United Kingdom, in 1919. (Note: Russell's son-in-law, John Gilbert Winant (1889–1947), committed suicide in 1947, following the breakdown of his marriage to Russell's daughter Constance, and Winant's failed affair with actress Sarah Churchill, the daughter of Prime Minister Winston Churchill.) After his death, she married her late sisters widower, Marion, in 1953. After Eppley's death in 1960, she married Walter K. Earle, a lawyer with Shearman & Sterling, in 1965.

He was a member of the New York Yacht Club, the Riding Club, the Union Club, the Metropolitan Club, the Century Association and the Princeton Club of New York. His wife was widely known for her contributions that allowed for the construction of the Cathedral Church of Saint Peter and Saint Paul (today known as the Washington National Cathedral) in Washington, D.C.

His wife died at their home, 34 East 36th Street, on February 11, 1918. Russell died at his home in New York on November 27, 1919. He was buried at Green-Wood Cemetery in Brooklyn. His entire estate, estimated at $50,000,000, was left to his children.

=== Residences ===
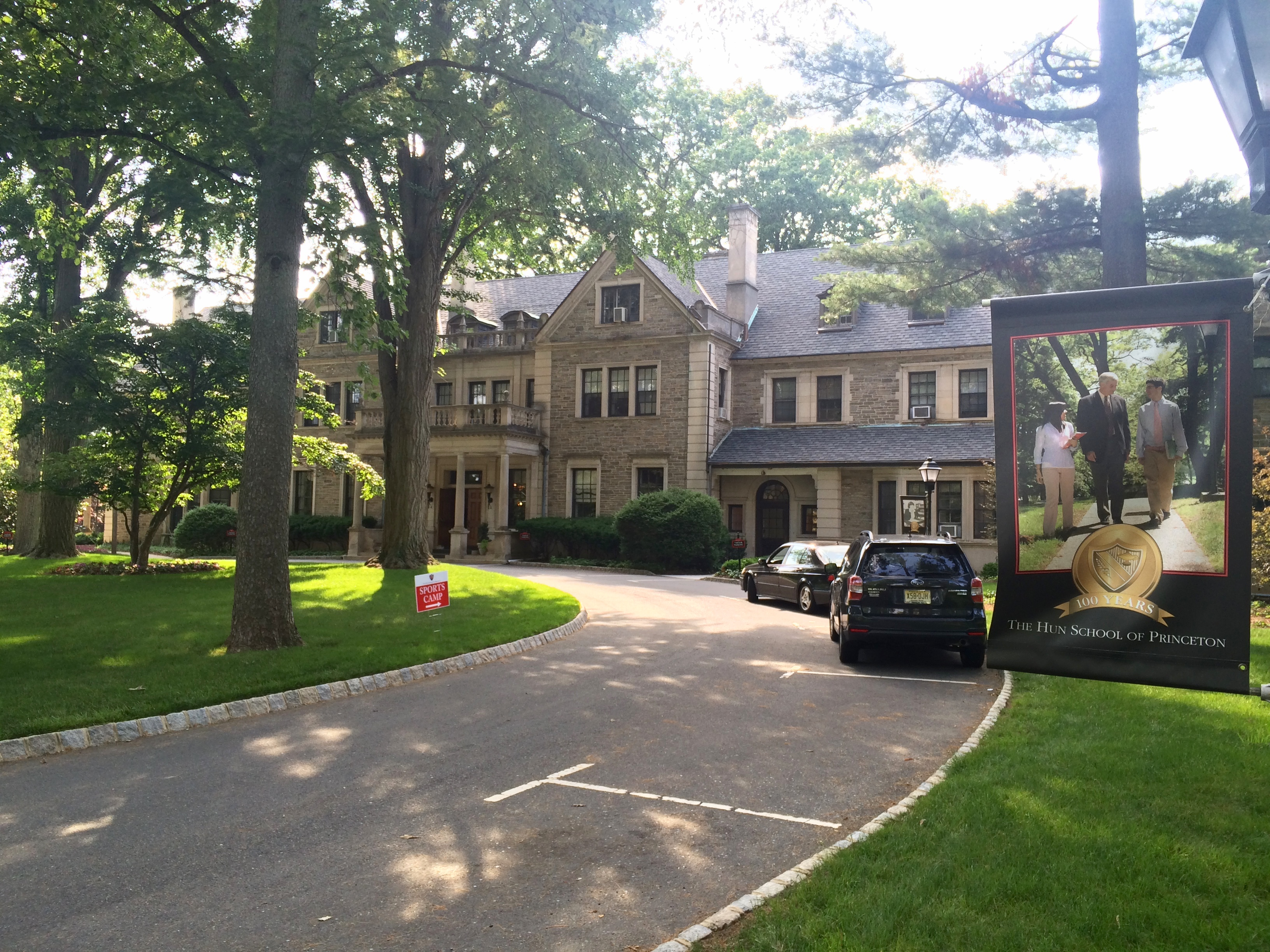
Edgerstoune, 2015.

In New York, the Russells lived at 34 East 36th Street. In 1903, Russell hired his brother William Hamilton Russell, a partner in the architecture firm of Clinton and Russell, to build Edgerstoune, (Note: Edgerstoune was named after Edgerston, the 1808 estate of his great-grandfather, U.S. Senator John Rutherfurd, on the banks of the Passaic River (near what is today Rutherford, New Jersey), which was itself named after Edgerston, the estate of their ancestors, Clan Rutherfurd, located just north of the Anglo-Scottish border, and eight miles south of Jedburgh in the Scottish Borders area of Scotland.) a Tudor Revival mansion on his Princeton estate. Edgerstoune, which cost between $2,000,000 and $3,000,000 to construct, was located across the street from Drumthwacket the estate of his brother-in-law, Moses Taylor Pyne (and currently the official residence of the governor of New Jersey), and directly adjoining the estates of Junius Spencer Morgan, William T. White, and C. B. Lambert. After his death, the 274-acre Edgerstoune estate was sold by his son-in-law, Governor John Gilbert Winant, to Albert Robertshaw who planned a large real estate development with a country club. Less than a month later, it was sold to Professor John G. Hun, headmaster of the Hun School of Princeton for $350,000.

=== Descendants ===
Through his son Archibald, he was a grandfather of A. Douglas Russell III, Louise Russell (wife of John Evelyn duPont Irving), Isabel Russell (wife of Robert S. Potter) and a great-grandfather of Linda Potter (born January 13, 1956) who married Timothy Shriver, a member of the Kennedy Family through his mother, Eunice Kennedy Shriver, a younger sister of President John F. Kennedy.

Through his youngest daughter Constance, he was a grandfather of Constance Winant (1921–1978) (wife of Peruvian scientist Carlos Valando); John Gilbert Winant Jr. (1922–1993) (who served as a bomber pilot in World War II and was taken prisoner by the Germans and sent to Colditz, before his removal in April 1945 as one of the Prominente to be used as a bargaining chip by Himmler and the SS as the end of the war approached; he was eventually released); and Rivington Russell Winant (1925–2011) (who also served in World War II and later became treasurer at the United Nations).
