= Percy Rivington Pyne =

Percy Rivington Pyne may refer to:

- Percy Rivington Pyne I (1820–1895), President of City National Bank
- Percy Rivington Pyne II (1857–1929), built Percy R. Pyne House in Manhattan
- Percy Rivington Pyne Jr. (1896–1941), decorated WWI aviator
- Percy Rivington Pyne 2nd (1882–1950), banker and golf champion
