= Eben Pyne =

American soldier and banker (1917–2007)

President of the Farmers' Loan and Trust Company
- In office 1957–1963
- Preceded by: Richard S. Perkins
- Succeeded by: James Stillman Rockefeller (as president of First National City Bank)

Personal details
- Born: June 14, 1917
- Died: April 11, 2007 (aged 89) Hobe Sound, Florida
- Spouses: Hilda Holloway (m. 1941; died 1986) Nancy Gray (m. 1995)
- Relations: Percy Rivington Pyne II (grandfather); Percy Rivington Pyne Jr. (uncle)
- Parent(s): Grafton Howland Pyne; Leta Constance Wright
- Education: Groton School
- Alma mater: Princeton University

Military service
- Branch/service: United States Army; New York Army National Guard
- Rank: Major
- Battles/wars: World War II
- Awards: Bronze Star Medal

Eben Wright Pyne (June 14, 1917 – April 11, 2007) was an American soldier and banker who served as president of the Farmers' Loan and Trust Company (which later became Citibank).

== Early life ==
Pyne was born on June 14, 1917. He was a son of financier Grafton Howland Pyne (1890–1935) and Leta Constance (née Wright) Pyne (1892–1957). Percy Rivington Pyne III, John Wright Pyne, and Alison (née Pyne) Ewing (wife of New Jersey State Senator John H. Ewing).

His paternal grandparents were the prominent banker and philanthropist Percy Rivington Pyne II and Maud (née Howland) Pyne (daughter of New York merchant Gardiner Greene Howland). His paternal uncle was Percy Rivington Pyne Jr., a flier with the 103d Aero Squadron during World War I. His maternal grandfather was prominent art collector Eben Wright.

Pyne attended the Groton School where he played on the football team before attending Princeton University, where he graduated in 1939.

== Career ==
After Princeton, he became a clerk at Farmers' Loan and Trust Company, an affiliate of what was then National City Bank of New York. After the World War II, he rejoined the bank and was promoted quickly. In 1957, he was named president of the Farmers' Loan and Trust Company, succeeding Richard S. Perkins who had been president since 1951. In 1959, it became First National City Trust which was incorporated into First National City Bank in 1963, when he was named "senior vice president in charge of the trust and investment division" before retiring in 1982.

In 1958, he was elected to the finance and currency committee of the New York Chamber of Commerce alongside Roy Reierson of Bankers Trust and Dudley H. Mills of the Discount Corporation of New York. In 1960, he joined the board of W. R. Grace & Co., which his wife's family founded.

=== Public service ===
In 1964, he was recruited by Gov. Nelson A. Rockefeller "to help rescue the failing Long Island Rail Road." After helping create "a $200 million modernization program" that was approved by the New York Legislature in 1965, "Pyne was appointed to a seat on the transportation agency's original five-member governing board. In that post, which he held until 1975, he helped steer the agency’s acquisition of other ailing suburban lines that had been merged into Conrail and later formed Metro-North." He was also a commissioner of the New York City Transit Authority, the Triborough Bridge and Tunnel Authority, the Manhattan and Bronx Surface Transit Operating Authority, the Staten Island Rapid Transit Operating Authority and Stewart International Airport.

In 1982, he was named by President Ronald Reagan to the Grace Commission (named after its director, the industrialist J. Peter Grace) which was "assigned to identify and suggest remedies for waste and abuse in the federal government."

=== Military service ===
In 1940, Pyne joined the field artillery of the New York National Guard as a second lieutenant and during World War II, he fought in North Africa and Italy. His small artillery-observation plane was shot down by enemy fire over the Po Valley in Northern Italy, "he was briefly taken prisoner, but jumped off his German captors’ truck and escaped to Allied lines with the help of Italian partisans. He returned home in 1946 as a Major, with the Bronze Star and five battle stars."

== Personal life ==
In 1941 Pyne was married to Hilda Elise Holloway (1920–1986), a daughter of Hilda (née Holmes) Holloway and William Grace Holloway, chairman of W. R. Grace & Co. Hilda was an avid golfer who showed horses at the Piping Rock Club in Locust Valley. Before her death in 1986, they were the parents of three daughters:

- Constance Howland Pyne (1943–1976), who married Randall Steele Howard in 1964. They divorced and she married Thomas Albert Ranges in 1970.
- Lillian Stokes Pyne (b. 1947), who married artist Peter Stockton Corbin in 1973.
- Mary Alison Pyne (b. 1960), who married Donald Bruce McNaughton in 1990.

In 1995, married Nancy Maguire (née Beebe) Gray, the daughter of Brig. Gen. Hamilton Ewing Maguire and the widow of Gordon Gray, a former secretary of the Army and president of the University of North Carolina. Pyne had homes in Manhattan, Old Westbury on Long Island, Hobe Sound, Florida, and Northeast Harbor, Maine.

Pyne died on April 11, 2007, at his home in Hobe Sound, Florida.
