= S. Sloan Colt =

American civil servant, banker and philanthropist

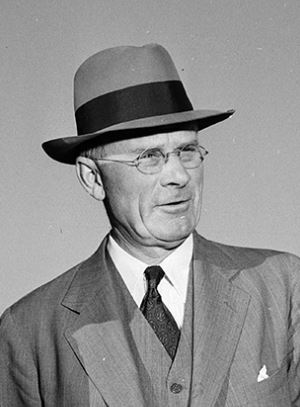

President of Bankers Trust
- In office 1931–1956
- Preceded by: Henry J. Cochran
- Succeeded by: Alex H. Ardrey

Personal details
- Born: Samuel Sloan Colt; July 13, 1892 Manhattan, New York
- Died: May 2, 1975 (aged 82) Westhampton Beach, New York
- Spouses: Margaret Van Buren Mason (m. 1918; div. 1945) Anne King Weld McLane (m. 1945)
- Children: 3
- Relatives: James C. Auchincloss (cousin); Samuel Sloan (grandfather); Samuel Colt (cousin twice removed); Samuel Pomeroy Colt (second uncle); Countess Victoria Bernstorff-Gyldensteen (cousin once removed)
- Education: Groton School
- Alma mater: Yale University

Samuel Sloan Colt (July 13, 1892 – May 2, 1975) was an American civil servant, banker, and philanthropist. He served as president and chairman of Bankers Trust, as a commissioner and chairman of the Port Authority of New York and New Jersey, and as a director of the Federal Reserve Bank of New York.

== Early life ==
Colt was born on July 13, 1892, in New York City. He was the only son of Richard Collins Colt (1863–1938) and Mary Adelaide (née Sloan) Colt (1868–1954), who owned Curry Farm in Garrison, New York. His younger sisters were Catherine Dunscomb Colt (wife of Charles Denston Dickey Jr., a senior partner at J.P. Morgan & Co.), and Mary Sloan Colt, the wife of Louis Curtis Jr. His father was an importer with Collins & Co.

His paternal grandparents were Harris Colt and Catherine (née Dunscomb) Colt. His maternal grandparents were Margaret (née Elmendorf) Sloan and Samuel Sloan, a former New York State Senator who was the longtime president of the Delaware, Lackawanna and Western Railroad. Among his large extended family was cousin James C. Auchincloss, a U.S. Representative from New York.

In 1910, he graduated from the Groton School before attending Yale University, where he graduated in 1914.

== Career ==
After his graduation from Yale, Colt joined the Farmers' Loan & Trust Company. During World War I, he entered the army as a corporal, served in the United States Army Ordnance Department in Washington, and was honorably discharged as major. Returning to Farmers', Colt was a vice president from 1925 until 1929, when the company merged into the National City Bank (today known as Citibank).

He joined Bankers Trust as a vice president and director in 1930 and became president the following year at the age of only 38, succeeding Henry J. Cochran. Upon his assumption of the presidency, he was also elected a director and a member of the executive committee. He was head of the bank for twenty-seven years and was made chairman in 1956 when Alex H. Ardrey became president. He retired in 1957 and was replaced as chairman by William Moore, but continued as a director and member of the executive and trust committees until 1965.

In 1946, Colt was appointed by Governor Thomas E. Dewey as a commissioner of the Port Authority of New York and New Jersey. In 1959, he was elected chairman, serving until his retirement from both chairman and commissioner in 1968. Mr. Colt served in both President Harry S. Truman's and President Dwight Eisenhower's administrations. In 1954, Colt was appointed as a member of President Dwight Eisenhower's Advisory Committee on the National Highway Program. Colt served as chairman of Eurofund Inc., from 1959 to 1968 and was a longtime trustee of the Mutual Life Insurance Company of New York (today known as Axa). He was a director of the Federal Reserve Bank of New York from 1944 to 1946, the General Electric Company from 1940 to 1963, the American Can Company from 1943 to 1965, and joined the boards of Pan Am in 1931 and General Foods in 1932. He also served as a trustee and treasurer of the Tax Foundation, president of the New York Clearing House Association, 1955 and 1957, and president of the New York State Bankers' Association in 1935.

== Philanthropy ==
Colt served as national chairman of the War Fund Program in 1941 and 1942 and was a director and treasurer of its New York chapter from 1945 to 1958. From 1953 to 1961, Colt was a trustee of the endowment fund of the American Red Cross. He also served as a trustee and treasurer of the Metropolitan Opera Association from 1941 to 1957 and president and a trustee of the National Fund for Medical Education from 1949 to 1964.

Colt funded a professorship at Columbia University forming the S. Sloan Colt Professor of Banking and International Finance. The professorship was first appointed in 1958 to Roger F. Murray, who was associate dean of the Columbia Business School and a crucial figure in the history of value investing. The professorship was also held by Roy Blough, who in addition to teaching at Columbia University was also an economist in the Roosevelt and Truman administrations. The professorship is currently held by Lawrence Glosten, who is also the chair of the finance and economics division at Columbia Business School.

From 1951 to 1961, he was treasurer of Recordings for the Blind and from 1939 to 1958, he was a governor and a member of the executive committee of the Federal Hall Memorial Association.

== Personal life ==
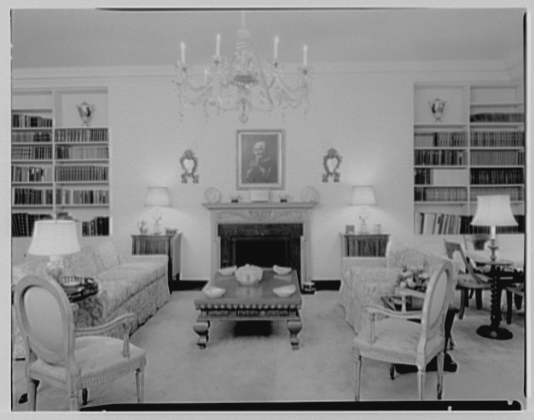
Photograph by Samuel Gottscho of the Colt residence at River House, 1960 (courtesy of the Library of Congress)

In January 1918, Colt was married to heiress Margaret Van Buren Mason, a daughter of George Grant Mason, at 854 Fifth Avenue, her parents New York townhouse. Margaret's father had inherited the majority of his uncle James Henry Smith's $12,000,000 estate. Before his death in 1907, Smith had been married to Annie Armstrong (née Stewart), the mother of Princess Anita de Braganza. Before the Colts divorced in September 1945, they were the parents of three children:

- Marion Mason Colt (1920–2000), who married MacLean Williamson (1911–1967), a son of Muriel (née Williams) Williamson Hoyt, at St. Mary's-in-Tuxedo Episcopal Church in December 1941.
- Catherine C. Colt (1921–2013), who married attorney David Wendell Yandell (1910–1983) in May 1941.
- Richard Colt (1924–1992), who married Cynthia de Bottari (1926–2016) in 1947. In 1952, the couple left New York and moved to Houston. They had four children together — S. Sloan Colt II, Cynthia Franklin, Richard Colt, and Laurie Van Wagenberg. Mrs. Colt resided at her home in the River Oaks neighborhood of Houston until her death in 2016. Cynthia's sister, Alexandra de Bottari married Richard's cousin, Samuel Sloan Walker Jr. in 1948.

After his divorce from Margaret, she remarried to Brig. Gen. Paul Everton Peabody of the Army War College, and he remarried to Anne King (née Weld) McLane (1910–1982), a daughter of Edward Motley Weld of Tuxedo Park, a former president of the New York Stock Exchange. After their marriage, they rented a two floor maisonette at 740 Park Avenue. They later lived at River House at 435 East 52nd Street. In 1961, Samuel Gottscho photographed the Colt's New York residence for documentation in the Library of Congress.

Colt died on May 2, 1975, at his home in Westhampton Beach, New York. He was buried at Westhampton Cemetery. His widow died in 1982.

=== Honors and awards ===
In 1936, Colgate University awarded him an honorary Doctor of Laws degree and, in 1950, New York University awarded him an honorary Doctor of Commercial Science. In 1949, France made him a Chevalier of the Legion of Honor.
