= Samuel Sloan =

Samuel Sloan may refer to:

- Samuel Sloan (architect) (1815–1884), Philadelphia-based architect and author of architecture books
- Samuel Sloan (railroad executive) (1817–1907), American politician and businessman, president of the Delaware, Lackawanna & Western Railroad
- Sam Sloan (Samuel Howard Sloan, born 1944), American chess player and publisher
