= Ulster Savings Bank =

Mutual savings bank headquartered in Kingston, New York, USA

- Type: Mutual savings bank
- Industry: Banking
- Founded: April 12, 1851; 175 years ago
- Headquarters: Kingston, New York
- Key people: Bill Calderara, CEO
- Total assets: $1.33 billion (2025)
- Total equity: $108 million (2025)
- Number of employees: 245
- Website: www.ulstersavings.com

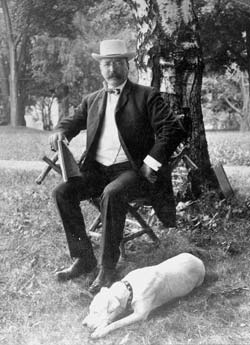
Alton B. Parker, president of the bank from 1896 to 1904 and Democratic nominee for President of the United States in 1904.

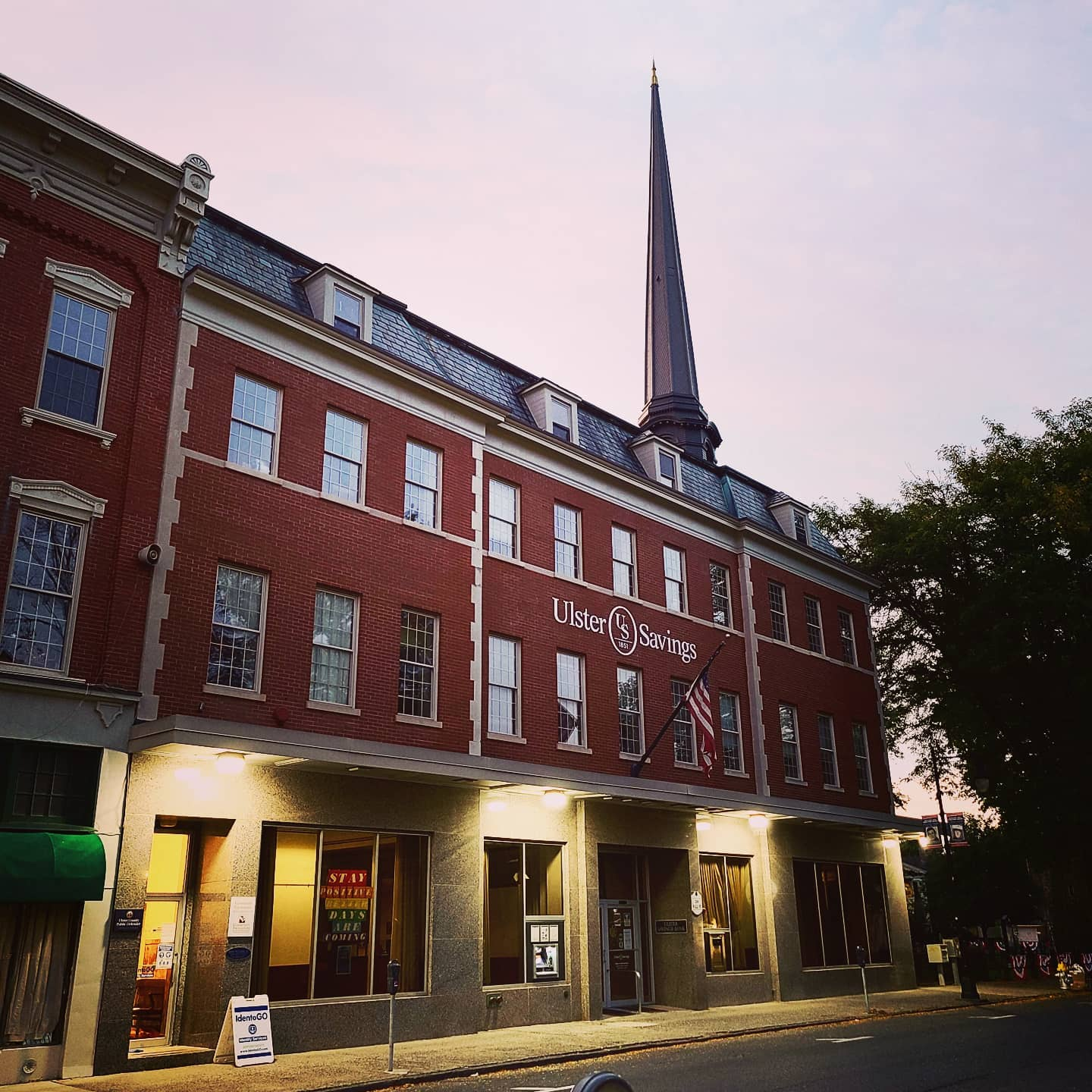
A recent photo of the original location in Kingston NY, located on Wall street.

Ulster Savings Bank is a mutual savings bank headquartered in Kingston, New York. The bank has 15 branches, all of which are in Ulster County, Orange County, or Dutchess County. The bank was founded on April 12, 1851.

== History ==
The bank was founded on April 12, 1851.

During this time, it was named the Ulster County Savings Institution. The day this bank was chartered by the New York State legislature, it became the first savings bank in Ulster County, New York.

On June 19, 1851, Severyn Bruyn, Ulster Savings Bank's first customer, made the first deposit, totaling $120 ($4,644 in 2025). Archibald Russell (father of Archibald D. Russell) was the first president of the bank; he served until 1870.

Between 1858 and 1868, deposits grew from $21,982 to $646,922 as the population of Kingston grew from 15,000 to 20,000.

In 1891, the treasurer and assistant treasurer of the bank were accused of stealing more than $400,000, resulting in the temporary closure of the bank. Both received prison sentences as a result of their actions in 1892.

In 1892, John B. Alliger was named treasurer of the bank. At that time, the bank had $1.835 million in deposits. By 1916, the bank had $5.135 million in deposits.

In 1896, Alton B. Parker was named president of the bank and served until his resignation in 1904.

In September 2011, Lisa Marie Cathie was named president and chief executive officer of the bank, succeeding Marjorie Rovereto.

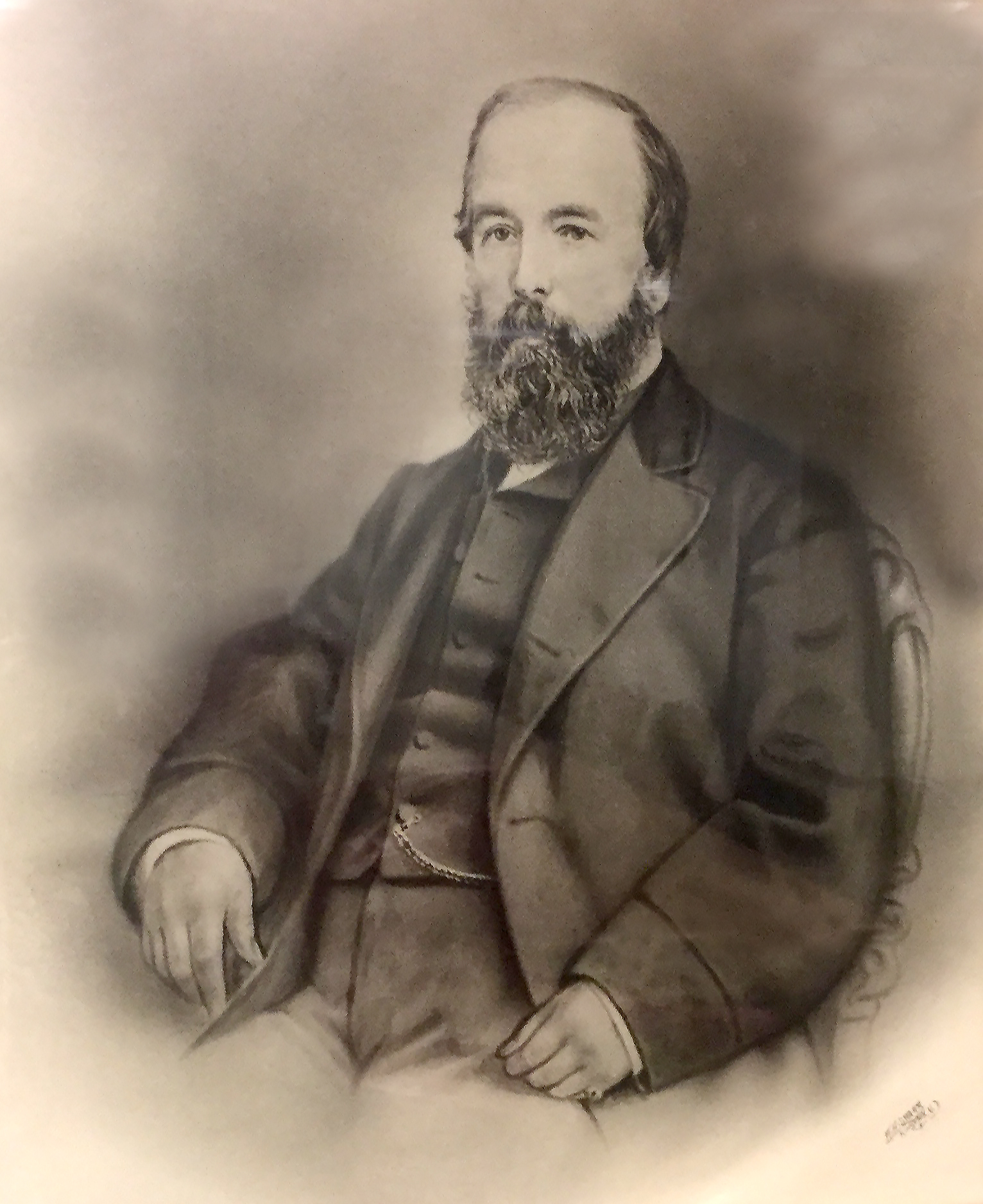
The first President of Ulster Savings Bank, Archibald Russell. One of a few local founders who pooled their assets to create a community financial institution; that today, is the oldest operational bank in the Hudson Valley.

In 2015, Glenn B. Sutherland replaced Lisa Marie Cathie as president and chief executive officer.

In January 2016, the bank opened a branch in Newburgh, New York.

In June 2016, William C. Calderara was named president and chief executive officer of the bank.

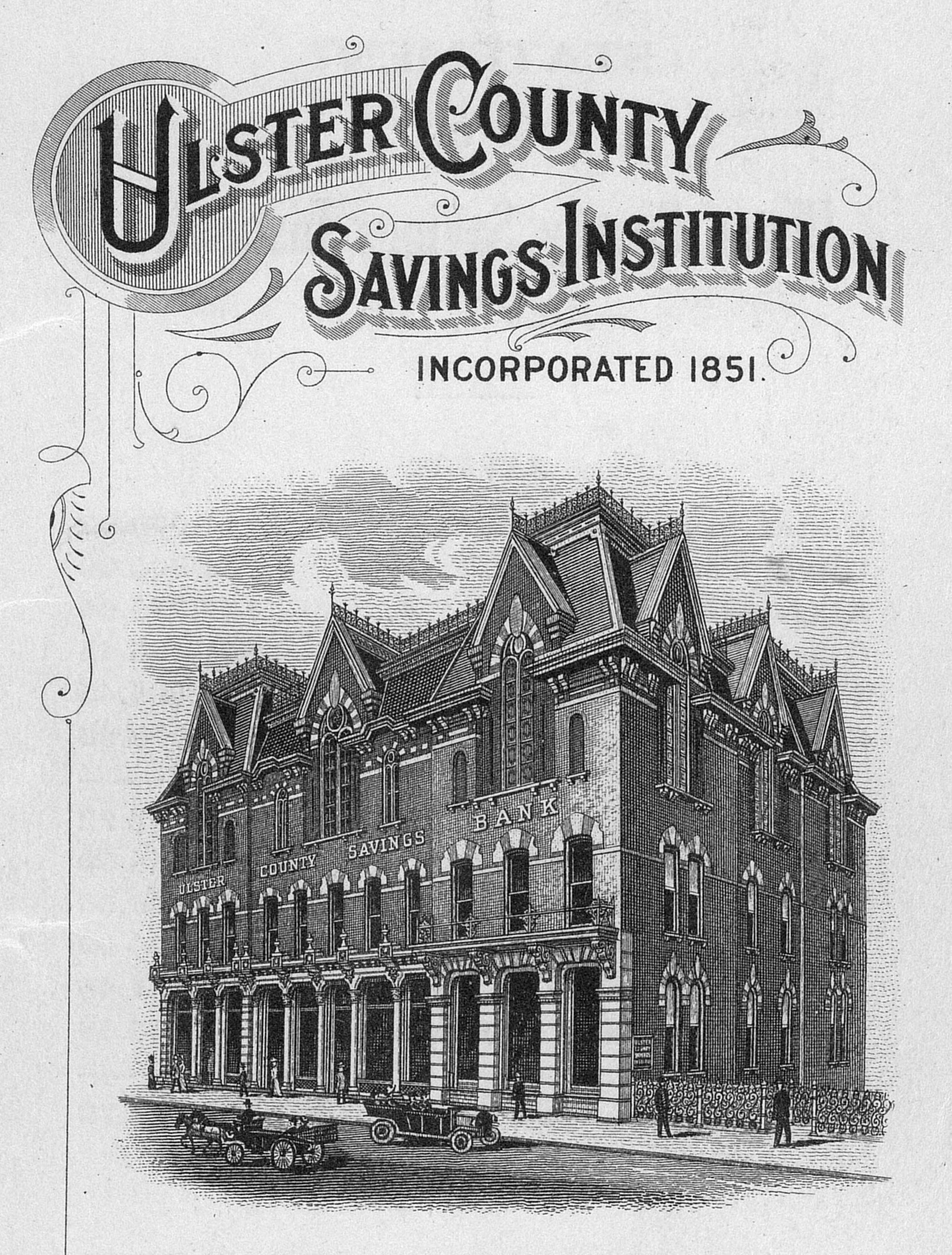
An illustration from an early newspaper of the first location the bank, which is still operational today and located on Wall street, Kingston, NY.

In 2016, to celebrate its 150th anniversary of inception the bank formalized their regular donations to the community into an official program called the Ulster Savings Bank Charitable Foundation.

Since the turn of the century, Ulster Savings Bank has increased their efforts to decrease their environmental impact. These additions and renovations led to the Ulster County Green Business Network to making Ulster Savings Bank into a Certified Green Business in 2021.

Ulster Savings is the oldest bank in the Hudson Valley, the 8th oldest in New York and the 52nd oldest bank in the country.
