= Marion Eppley =

American chemist

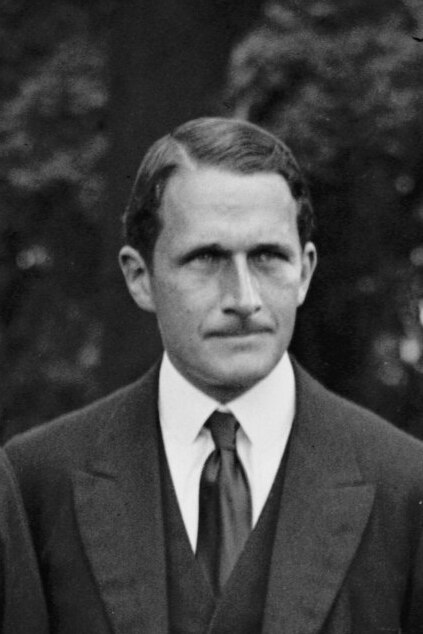
- Eppley in 1923
- Born: June 19, 1883; West Orange, New Jersey
- Died: November 22, 1960 (aged 77); Oyster Bay, New York
- Education: Princeton University

Marion Eppley (19 June 1883, West Orange, New Jersey – 22 November 1960, Oyster Bay, New York) was an American physical chemist.

== Biography ==
Eppley received from Princeton University his B.S. in 1906, M.A. in 1912, and Ph.D. in 1919. He married his first wife, Ethelberta Pyne née Russell, on 6 May 1909 in Trinity Church, Princeton.

The First World War cut off the US supply of standard cells from Germany that were needed for precise calibration of potentiometers and other electrical manufacturing instruments. At Princeton, Captain Eppley had begun experimentation in the manufacture of these cells and in 1917 launched the Eppley Laboratory in Newport, Rhode Island, to produce them.

During WW I, Eppley was a lieutenant commander in the U.S. Navy and after the war became a naval reserve officer. In 1941 he was recalled to active duty as a captain.

His research dealt with improvements in cadmium storage batteries, as well as thermal radiation instrumentation. He directed the Eppley Research Laboratory until his death in 1960. In 1947 he established the Eppley Foundation for Research, and his will created a charitable trust to support the Foundation and the Marion Eppley Wildlife Refuge. The Eppley Foundation for Research should not be confused with the Eppley Foundation founded in Omaha, Nebraska by Eugene C. Eppley.

Marion Eppley was awarded the Howard N. Potts Medal in 1927. For his service in WW II, he was awarded the Legion of Merit. He was elected a Fellow of the American Institute of Chemists, the American Physical Society, the New York Academy of Sciences, and the Institute of Electrical and Electronics Engineers.

He was introduced to Newport society by his first wife, who was a member of the Lewis Morris and Moses Taylor families of Newport. His first wife died in 1952 and he married his second wife in 1953. Sometime during the 1940s, Eppley purchased from the estate of Samuel Powel, a son of Colonel John Hare Powel and a member of the Samuel Powel family, a portrait of George Washington painted by Joseph Wright. Eppley and his first wife hung the painting at their house in Newport and later at their residence on Long Island. In 1972, Eppley's widow, Constance Rivington Russell Earle, who married Walter K. Earle after Captain Epley died, donated the portrait to the Historical Society of Pennsylvania.

== Legacy ==
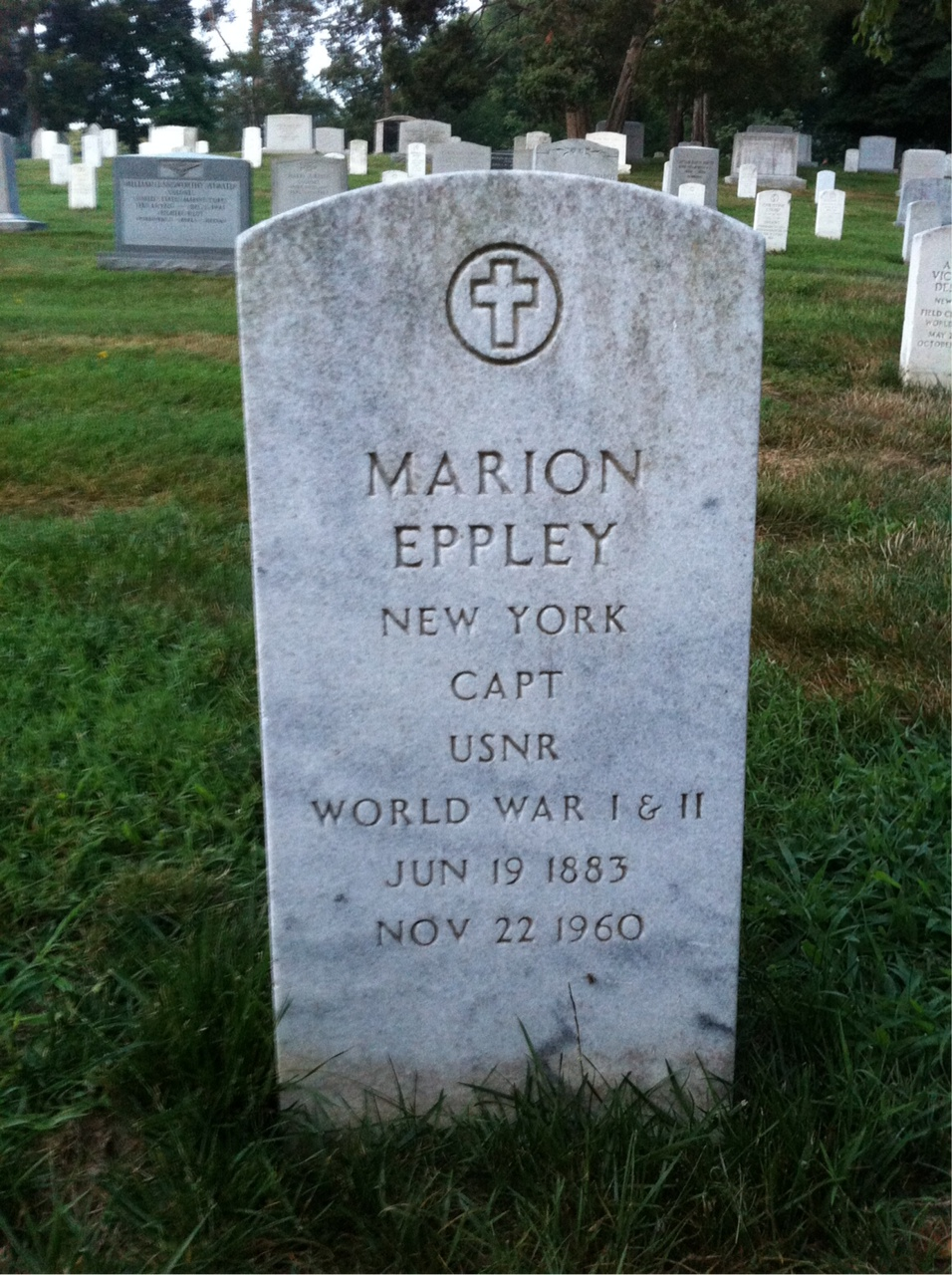
Grave at Arlington National Cemetery

The fish Parotocinclus eppleyi Schaefer & Provenzano, 1993 was named in his honor.
