= Farmers' Loan and Trust Company =

Former bank of the United States

- Formerly: Farmers' Fire Insurance and Loan Company (1822–1836)
- Type: Private
- Industry: Banking
- Founded: 1822; 204 years ago
- Defunct: 1959; 67 years ago
- Fate: Acquired by First National City Bank
- Successor: City Bank-Farmers Trust Company (1929-1963); Citibank
- Headquarters: City Bank-Farmers Trust Building, Manhattan, New York, United States
- Key people: Rufus King Delafield; Henry Seymour; James H. Perkins

The Farmers' Loan and Trust Company was a national bank headquartered in New York City that later became Citibank.

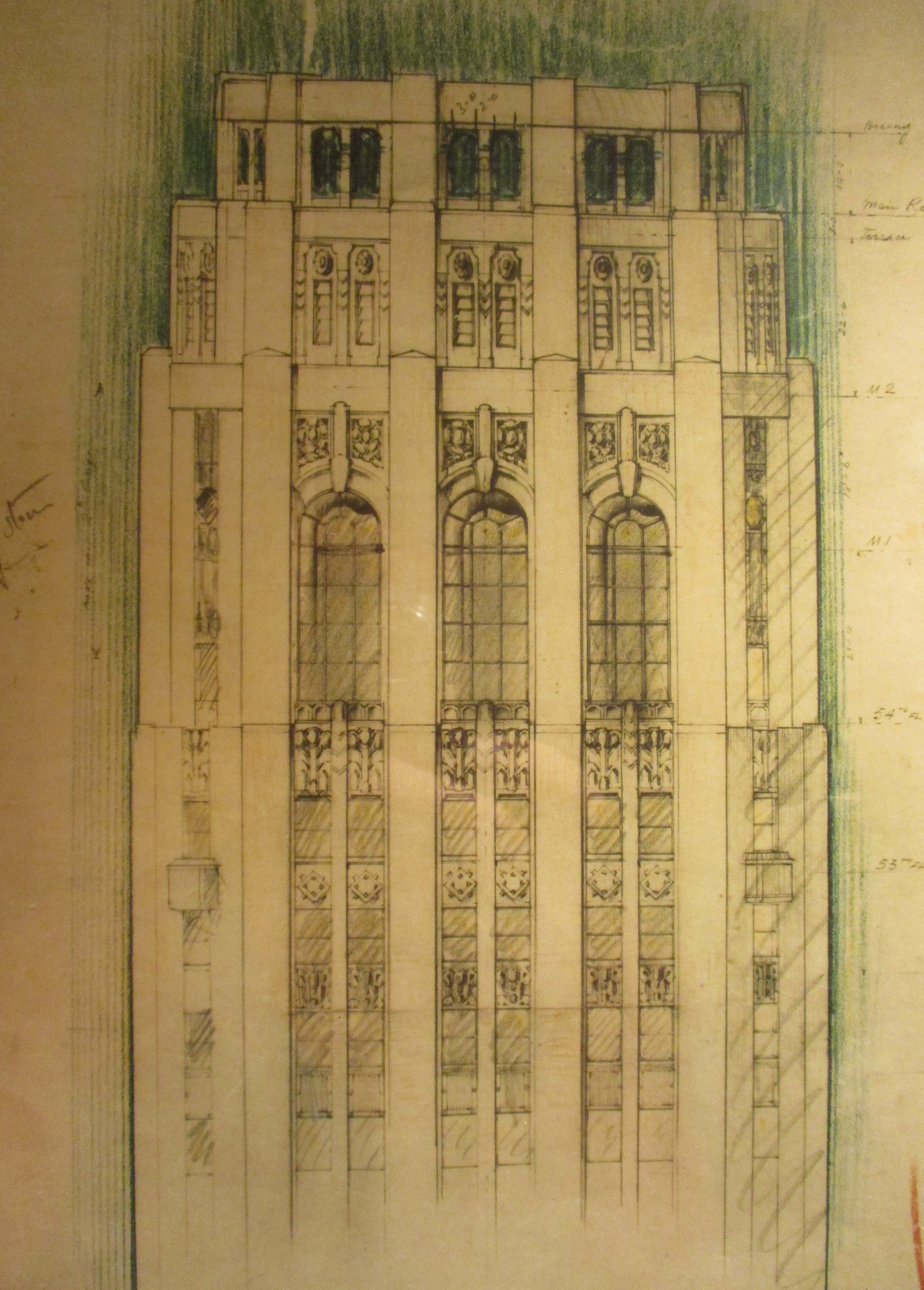
Architectural drawing of City Bank-Farmers Trust Building by Lev Vladimir Goriansky, c. 1929

== History ==
On February 28, 1822, the New York State Legislature granted a charter to the Farmers' Fire Insurance and Loan Company with capital stock of $500,000 which could be increased to $1,000,000 "when expedient". At the first meeting of the board of directors on March 9, 1822, John T. Champlin, the largest individual stockholder, was chosen president and served until his death in 1830. In 1836, its name was changed to the Farmers' Loan and Trust Company.

In 1879, Roswell G. Rolston served as president and George F. Talman was vice president. The members of the executive committee of the board of directors were Moses Taylor (president of National City Bank), John Jacob Astor III, Isaac Bell Jr. (a cotton broker who was the U.S. Minister to the Netherlands), Talman, Samuel Sloan (president of the Delaware, Lackawanna and Western Railroad), Edward Minturn (of Grinnell, Minturn & Co.), and Rolston. In 1880, Robert Lenox Kennedy (a nephew of James Lenox) replaced Minturn on the executive committee.

=== Mergers ===
On June 1, 1929, the Farmers' Loan and Trust Company merged with the National City Bank where National City Bank took over the expanded bank's banking operations, while Farmers' Trust became the City Bank-Farmers Trust Company, an affiliate subsidiary of National City Bank, that took over the trust operations. Two years later, the Trust Company merged with the Bank of America Trust Company to become New York's largest financial institution.

In February 1940, the company, as trustee, purchased the Hotel Knickerbocker on West 42nd Street in Manhattan at auction for $742,500 in foreclosure proceedings against the Kerback Realty Corporation and others. In 1942, the firm celebrated its 120th anniversary.

In January 1959, the shareholders approved a name change from City Bank Farmers Trust Company to First National City Trust Company which involved a shift of the trust company's status from that of a state-chartered to a national bank. In 1963, the company merged into the First National City Bank (which itself was a result of the 1955 merger of the National City Bank and the First National Bank into The First National City Bank of New York; which was shortened to First National City Bank in 1962). In 1976, the First National City Bank's name was changed to Citibank, N.A.

== Company headquarters ==
The company's first office was a private dwelling at 34 Wall Street. Upon the completion of the Merchant's Exchange Building in 1827, Farmers' moved its headquarters there, remaining until the Great Fire of New York destroyed the building in 1835. After renting office space since its inception, (Note: The company offices from 1822 to 1827 were 34 Wall Street; from 1827 to 1835 were 55 Wall Street; from 1839 to 1848 were 16 Wall Street; from 1848 to 1852 were 50 Wall Street; from 1852 to 1859 were 28 Exchange Place; from 1859 to 1866 were 56 Wall Street; from 1866 to 1882 were 26 Exchange Place; from 1882 to 1889 were 20-22 William Street.) the company purchased a plot of land in 1882 for $120,000 on William Street and built a two and a half story building which it used as its headquarters from 1889 until 1890. In February 1889 it purchased the adjacent plot for $250,000 and built a new building 16-22 William Street at a total construction cost of $1,064,159.19 for the old and new building. The architect of the new eight-storey office structure was C. W. Clinton and David H. King, Jr. received the contract for the entire work. By 1908, the business had again outgrown its space so it purchased the property of the Delaware, Lackawanna and Western Railroad Company for $625,000 at the corner of William and Exchange Place, north and west of the plots already owned by the company. The new building was completed in 1909 at a cost of $1,476,037.84.

Between 1930 and 1931, the bank tore down its existing headquarters, (Note: Farmers' tore down four structures: two 10-story buildings on William Street, one 9-story building on Hanover Street, and one 15-story building extending between Beaver Street and Exchange Place.) and built a new fifty-nine story structure known as the City Bank-Farmers Trust Building at 20 Exchange Place, which became one of New York City's tallest buildings. The steel-framed structure sheathed in granite and limestone was designed in the Art Deco style by Cross & Cross. The building served as the company's headquarters until 1956 and the City Bank-Farmers Trust Building was eventually sold by Citigroup in 1979.

== Notable employees ==
List of presidents:

- 1822–1830: John T. Champlin
- 1830–1832: Oliver H. Hicks
- 1832–1832: Frederick A. Tracy
- 1832–1835: Elisha Tibbets
- 1835–1837: Henry Seymour
- 1837–1842: Lewis Curtis
- 1842–1842: Charles Stebbins
- 1842–1845: Robert C. Cornell
- 1845–1865: Douw D. Williamson
- 1865–1898: Rosewell G. Rolston
- 1898–1921: Edwin S. Marston
- 1921–1929: James H. Perkins
- 1936–1951: Lindsay Bradford
- 1951–1957: Richard S. Perkins
- 1957–1959: Eben W. Pyne

Other notable employees:

- Archibald McIntyre; Secretary (1822–1823)
- Rufus King Delafield; Secretary (1836–1852)
- Samuel Sloan Jr.; Secretary (1897–1907), Vice-President (1907)
- William B. Cardozo
