= Parotocinclus eppleyi =

Scientific classification
- Kingdom: Animalia
- Phylum: Chordata
- Class: Actinopterygii
- Order: Siluriformes
- Family: Loricariidae
- Genus: Parotocinclus
- Species: P. eppleyi

Binomial name
- Parotocinclus eppleyi Schaefer & Provenzano, 1993

Species of fish

Parotocinclus eppleyi is a fish in the family Loricariidae native to South America. It is found swimming in the upper and middle portions of the Rio Orinoco. This species reaches a length of 3 cm (1.2 in).

The fish is named in honor of Capt. Marion Eppley (1883–1960), the founder of the Eppley Foundation for Research in New York, for its financial support of the authors’ 1989–1991 collecting efforts in Venezuela, which led to the discovery of this species.
