= Percy Rivington Pyne II =

American banker (1857–1929)

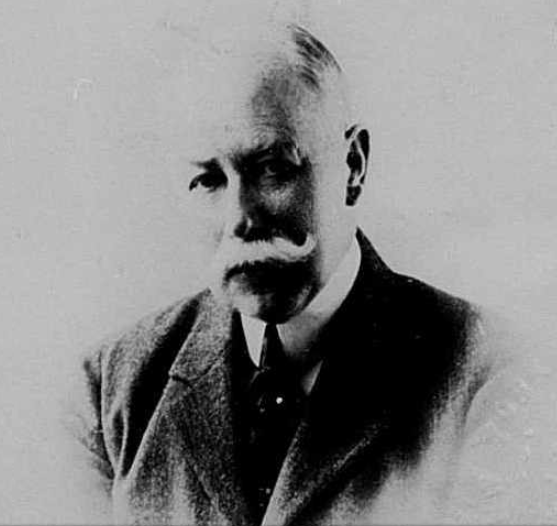
- Pyne in 1921
- Born: May 5, 1857; New York City, New York, U.S.
- Died: August 22, 1929 (aged 72); Bernardsville, New Jersey, U.S.
- Education: Princeton University (B.A., 1878: M.A., 1881)
- Spouse: Maud Howland (m. 1889)
- Children: 5, including Percy Jr.
- Parent(s): Percy Rivington Pyne I Albertina Shelton Taylor
- Relatives: Moses Taylor Pyne (brother); Moses Taylor (grandfather); Percy Pyne 2nd (nephew)

Percy Rivington Pyne II (May 5, 1857 – August 22, 1929) was a banker, financier, and philanthropist.

== Early life ==
Pyne was born on May 5, 1857 in New York City, the son of Percy Rivington Pyne I (1820–1895) and Albertina Shelton (née Taylor) Pyne (1833–1900). His maternal grandfather was Moses Taylor, founder of the First National City Bank of New York and a stockholder in the Delaware, Lackawanna and Western Railroad. His older brother, Moses Taylor Pyne, inherited much of the family fortune and was a major benefactor of Princeton University.

Pyne received a B.A. degree from Princeton in 1878 and an M.A. degree in 1881.

== Career ==
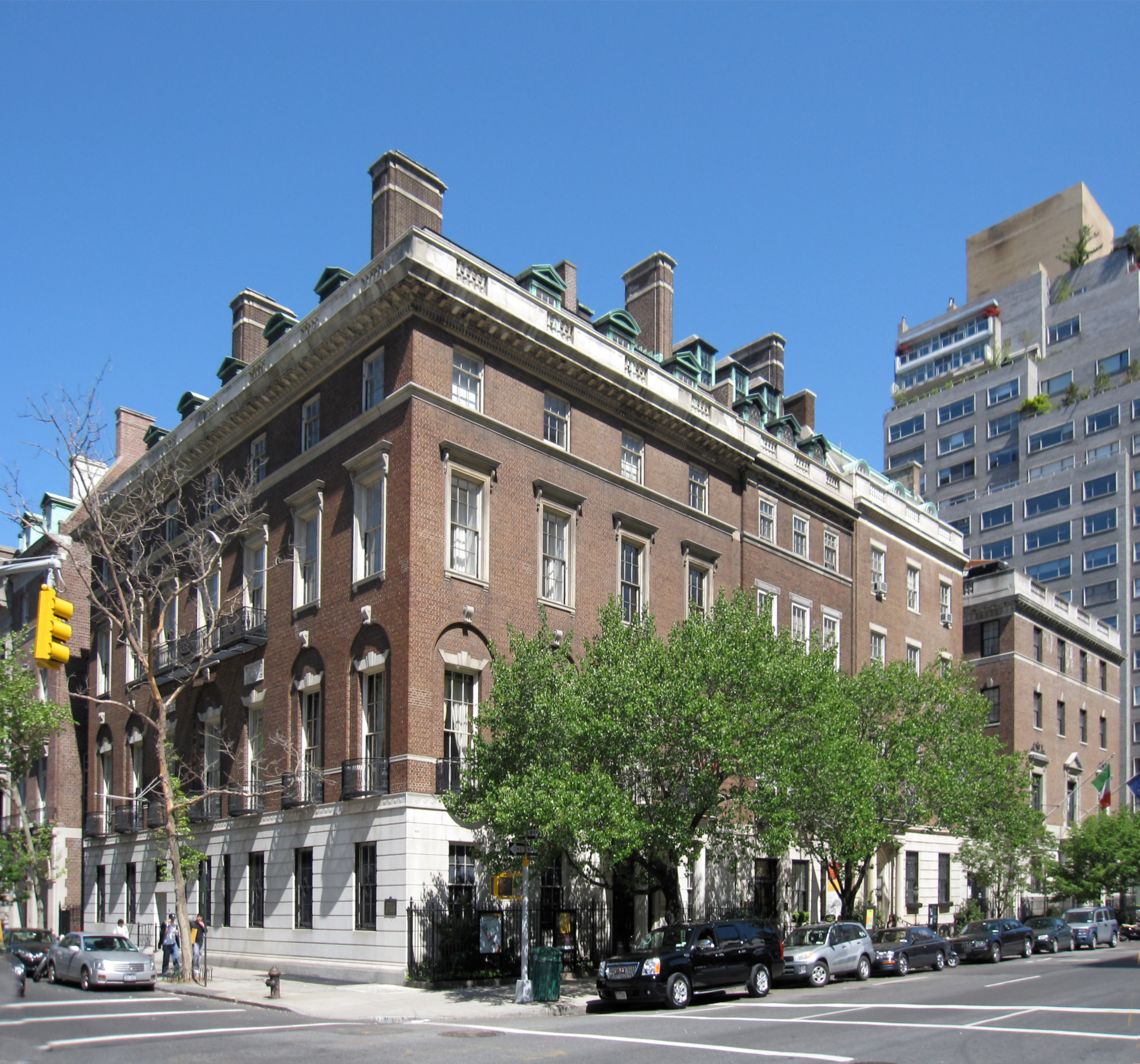
Pyne's New York City residence at 680 Park Avenue

He began his business career under the tutelage of his maternal grandfather, Moses Taylor, serving as a partner in the firm of Moses Taylor & Co. He would follow in his grandfather's footsteps, becoming director of the National City Bank as well as manager of the Delaware, Lackawanna and Western Railroad.

From 1903 to 1922, Pyne also served as treasurer of the New York Zoological Society.

=== Residences ===
In New York City, Pyne and his family lived at 680 Park Avenue at the corner of East 68th Street, now home to the Americas Society. In 1899, he built the mansion Upton Pyne in Bernardsville, New Jersey, as a summer home. It was named after Upton Pyne in Devon, England, his family's ancestral manor. It was the largest mansion in the area until it was torn down by his daughter in 1982.

== Personal life ==
On June 20, 1889, he married Maud Howland (1866–1952), daughter of New York merchant Gardiner Greene Howland. Maud's brother Dulany Howland married Marguerite McClure, who later remarried Ogden Haggerty Hammond, the father of Millicent Fenwick. Together, Percy and Maud Pyne had five children:

- Grafton Howland Pyne (1890–1935), who married Leta Constance Wright (1892–1957), a daughter of Eben Wright and Leta Pell.
- Herbert Rivington Pyne (1892–1952), who married Florence Ledyard Blair (1893–1982), daughter of banker C. Ledyard Blair.
- Mary Percy Pyne (b. November 27, 1893, d. May 10, 1994), who married Oliver Dwight Filley (1883–1961), a grandson of Oliver Filley and cousin of Dwight F. Davis. In 1963 she married Charles Suydam Cutting (1889-1972).
- Percy Rivington Pyne Jr. (1896–1941), a flier with the 103d Aero Squadron during World War I.
- Meredith Howland Pyne (b. October 5, 1898, d. November 25, 1927), who did not marry.

Pyne died at his Bernardsville, New Jersey, home on August 22, 1929, at the age of 72.
