= Oulagisket =

Historic house in New York, United States

- Oulagisket / Lisburne Grange (Garrison, NY)
- U.S. National Register of Historic Places
- Location within New York Location within the United States
- Location: NY 9-D, Philipstown, New York
- Coordinates: 41°22′34″N 73°56′10″W
- Area: 19 acres (7.7 ha)
- Built: ca. 1864
- Architectural style: Italianate
- MPS: Hudson Highlands MRA
- NRHP reference No.: 82001253
- Added to NRHP: November 23, 1982

Oulagisket or "Lisburne Grange," also known as the Sloan Estate, is a historic estate located in Garrison, New York, in Putnam County. It consists of the main house and carriage house (c. 1864), superintendent's cottage (c. 1890), barns (1916), and carpenter's shop (c. 1900). The main house is a 2 1/2-story stuccoed masonry building in the Italianate style. It has a large 2-story service wing. The carriage house is a 2-story masonry building with a gable roof.

The house was built by Samuel Sloan and his wife, Margaret Elmendorf Sloan, in Garrison, New York, as their summer estate, which they called Oulasgisket. Sloan, best known for his 32-year-long presidency of the Delaware, Lackawanna and Western Railroad, was a prominent 19th century railroad magnate. Now consisting of 16 acres, the original estate comprised several hundred acres, consisting of outbuildings, barns, and, ultimately, three large summer homes built as wedding presents for three of his children. The house was originally approximately 8,000 square feet and was built in the mid-nineteenth-century Gothic style then popular in the United States.

His son and daughter-in-law, Katherine and Samuel Sloan, Jr., inherited the estate in 1907 and began large scale changes and modifications. The original American Indian name, Oulagiskit, was changed to Lisburne Grange, in honor of the birthplace of Samuel Sloan, Sr. in Lisburne, County Down, Ireland. The house itself was expanded by approximately 5,000 square feet and completely redesigned in the then more-popular Italianate style, largely eliminating all Gothic traces. In addition, Fletcher Steele, one America's most famous landscape architects of the first half of the 20th century, was hired to redesign and expand the existing landscaping. His work was performed in the late 1920s and resulted in a series of gardens and vistas that were widely admired as examples of his work. Steele's last piece of work for the Sloans was a replacement summerhouse, completed in 1937 and inspired by Chinese architecture which Steele encountered in a 1934 trip to China.

Following the death of Katherine Sloan in the early 1950s, the estate was ultimately sold to its first non-Sloan owners, who occupied the property until 2010, when it was sold again. Remarkably, Lisburne Grange was owned by only three families for almost 150 years.

It was listed on the National Register of Historic Places in 1982.
