= Percy Rivington Pyne 2nd =

American banker and golfer (1882–1950)

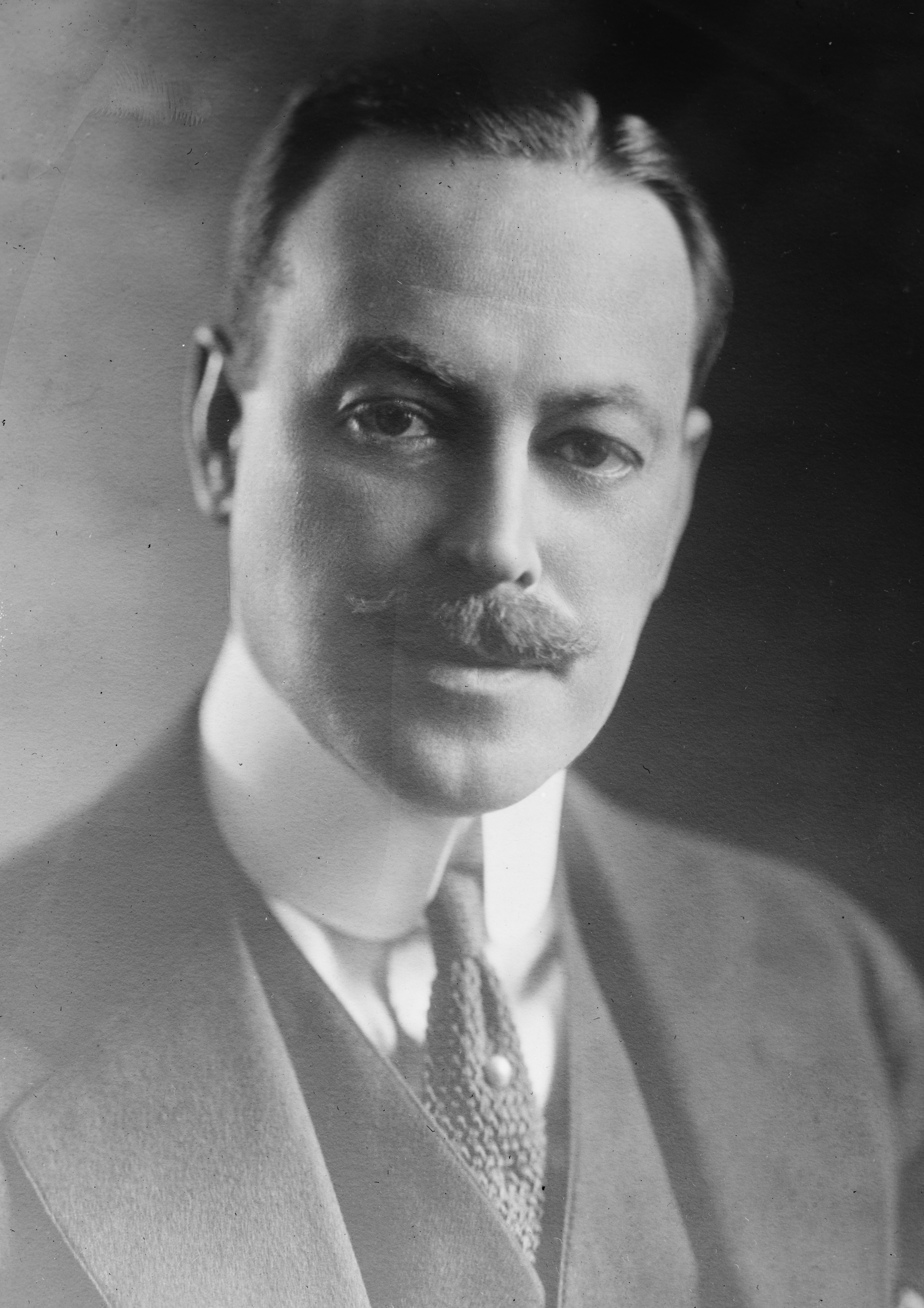
- Pyne in 1918
- Born: June 23, 1882; New York City, New York, U.S.
- Died: August 15, 1950 (aged 68); Sepulveda, California, U.S.
- Education: St. Paul's School; Princeton University (B.A.)
- Occupations: Banker, financier, and philanthropist
- Parent(s): Moses Taylor Pyne; Anna Margaretta Stockton

Percy Rivington Pyne 2nd (June 23, 1882 – August 15, 1950) was a banker, financier, and philanthropist. He founded the stock exchange firm of Pyne, Kendall Hollister.

== Early life ==
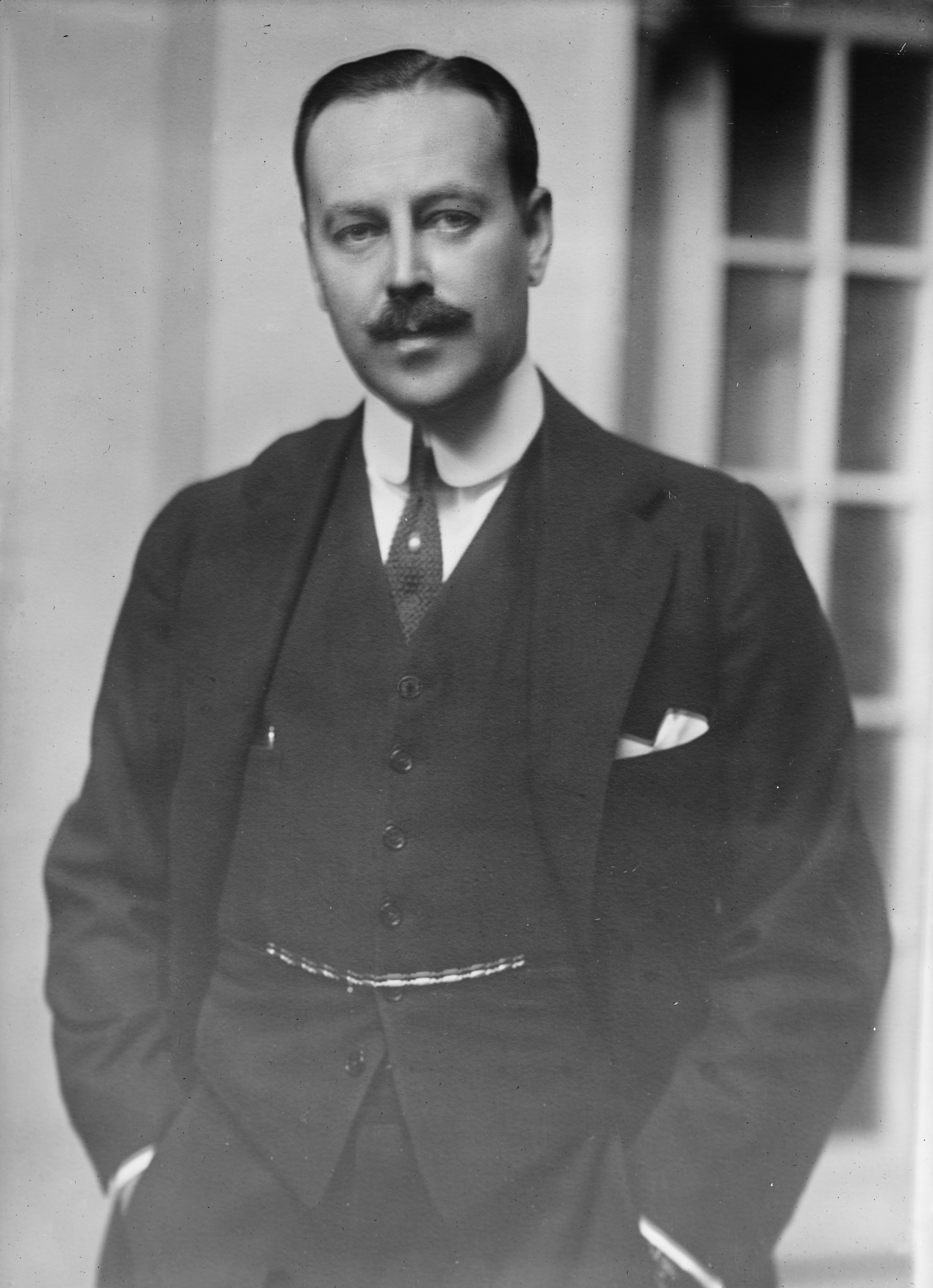
Photograph of Pyne from the George Grantham Bain Collection at the Library of Congress.

He was born on June 23, 1882, in New York City, the son of Moses Taylor Pyne (1855–1921) and Anna Margaretta Stockton. His father inherited much of the Moses Taylor family fortune and was a major benefactor of Princeton University. His mother was a direct descendant of Richard Stockton, signer of the Declaration of Independence.

Pyne prepared for college at St. Paul's School in Concord, New Hampshire. He received a B.A. degree from Princeton in 1903. While a freshman, Pyne won the Intercollegiate Golf Association individual championship in 1899.

== Career ==
In 1904, he began his financial career in connection with the Farmers' Loan & Trust Co., and in 1907 became associated with the management of the Moses Taylor Estate.

On February 8, 1909, Pyne organized the banking firm of Pyne, Kendall & Hollister, with offices in the new National City Bank Building at 55 Wall Street. He was a member of the board of directors of the Commercial Trust Co. of New Jersey, the East River Gas Co., the New Amsterdam Gas Co., the Syracuse & Binghamton Railroad, Cayuga & Susquehanna Railroad, the Delaware, Lackawanna & Western Coal Co., etc. He was president and director of the Prospect Company of New Jersey and was trustee and chairman of the East Side Branch of the Young Men's Christian Association.

== Personal life ==
Pyne was a friend and benefactor to hockey legend Hobart A. H. Baker. Baker resided at Pyne's home at 263 Madison Avenue. Pyne sent Baker gifts and clothing while he was fighting in France. After Baker's death in a plane crash, Pyne became chairman of the Fund Committee that erected Hobey Baker Memorial Rink at Princeton in honor of his friend.

Pyne married Tillie Josephine Medley on August 12, 1950. He died at his Sepulveda, California, home on August 15, 1950, at the age of 68, after a long and debilitating illness.

=== Society life ===
In New York City, he belonged to the following clubs: Union Club of the City of New York, Knickerbocker Club, University Club of New York, Racquet and Tennis Club, Metropolitan Club, New York Yacht Club, The Union League Club, Down Town Association, Aero, Automobile, Princeton Club of New York, Underwriters, Touring Club of America, Manhattan, Intercollegiate, Whitehall and Motor Car Touring Society. Other clubs and societies to which he belonged : Meadow Brook Golf Club, Short Beach, Rockaway Hunting Club, Morris County Golf Club, Baltusrol Golf Club, Garden City Golf Club, National Golf, Tuxedo Club, South Side Sportmen's Club, Westbrook Golf, Archdale Quail, Islip, Touring Club of France, Automobile Association of London, and St. Nicholas Society.
