= Samuel Sloan (railroad executive) =

American politician, businessman and executive

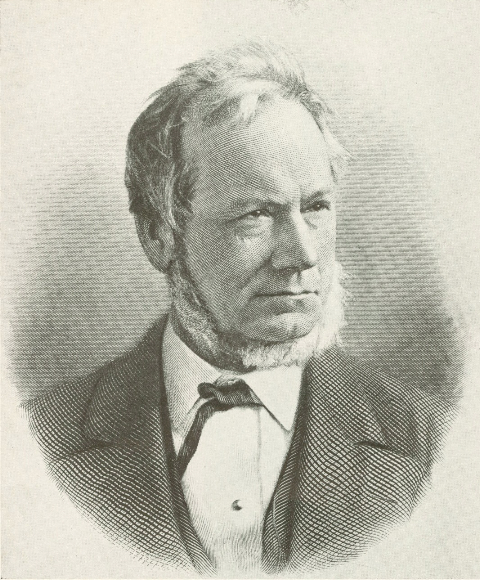
- Early 20th century Crosshatch Portrait.
- Born: December 25, 1817; Lisburn, County Down, Ireland
- Died: September 22, 1907 (aged 89); Garrison, New York, U.S.
- Occupations: Importer, Senator, Railroad Executive
- Spouse: Margaret Elmendorf (after 1844)
- Children: 11
- Parent(s): William Sloan and Elizabeth Simpson
- Relatives: James C. Auchincloss (grandson); S. Sloan Colt (grandson)

Samuel Sloan (December 25, 1817 – September 22, 1907) was an American politician, businessman and executive. He is most known for his tenure as the president of the Delaware, Lackawanna and Western Railroad (DL&W) for 32 years.

== Early life ==
Samuel Sloan was born in Lisburn, County Down, Ireland to William and Elizabeth Sloan and moved to New York when he was one year old. He attended the Columbia College Preparatory school until he was 14, at the time of his father's death. After withdrawing, he became employed at an importing house in New York, eventually becoming the head of the firm.

== Career ==
Sloan was elected as a Supervisor in Kings County (Brooklyn) in 1852, and was president of the Long Island College Hospital. He became a director of the Hudson River Railroad in 1855, left the importing business in 1857 and was elected to the New York State Senate, where he served for two years.

He became a director of the Delaware, Lackawanna and Western Railroad in 1864, and became its president in 1867. Prior to accepting the DL&W Presidency, Sloan had declined an offer to become President of the New York and Harlem Railroad. He extended the DL&W rail lines, and the company achieved great success, in part due to the traffic generated for transport of anthracite coal mined in the railway's expanded territory. Passenger traffic also increased, particularly between New York City and the Pocono Mountains in Pennsylvania, a popular resort area.

Sloan resigned from the DL&W presidency in 1899, but continued as chairman of the board. He served on the boards of banks, utilities and other companies.

== Personal life ==
On April 8, 1844, Sloan married Margaret Elmendorf in New Brunswick, New Jersey, and moved to Brooklyn, New York. Margaret was a daughter of Peter Zabriskie Elmendorf and Maria La Grange (née Van Vechten) Elmendorf. They had eleven children, including:

- Peter Elmendorf Sloan (1845–1916), who graduated from West Point in 1865.
- Maria LaGrange Sloan (1847–1929), who married Edgar Stirling Auchincloss (1847–1892), parents of U.S. Representative James C. Auchincloss.
- Margaret Elmendorf Sloan (1854–1906), who married the Rev. Joseph Rankin Duryee (1853–1935) in 1883.
- William Simpson Sloan (1859–1896), who married Julia Rapallo (1862–1935).
- Elizabeth LaGrange Sloan (1862–1960), who married Joseph Walker Jr. (1858–1927), senior partner and president of the investment banking firm of Joseph Walker & Sons, in 1887.
- Samuel Sloan Jr. (1864–1939), a banker with Farmers' Loan and Trust Company who married Katherine Colt and inherited Oulagisket.
- Mary Adelaide Sloan (1868–1954), who married Richard Collins Colt (1863–1938), parents of banker S. Sloan Colt.

Sloan died in Garrison, New York, in 1907 at the age of 89, having been the president of seventeen corporations during his lifetime.

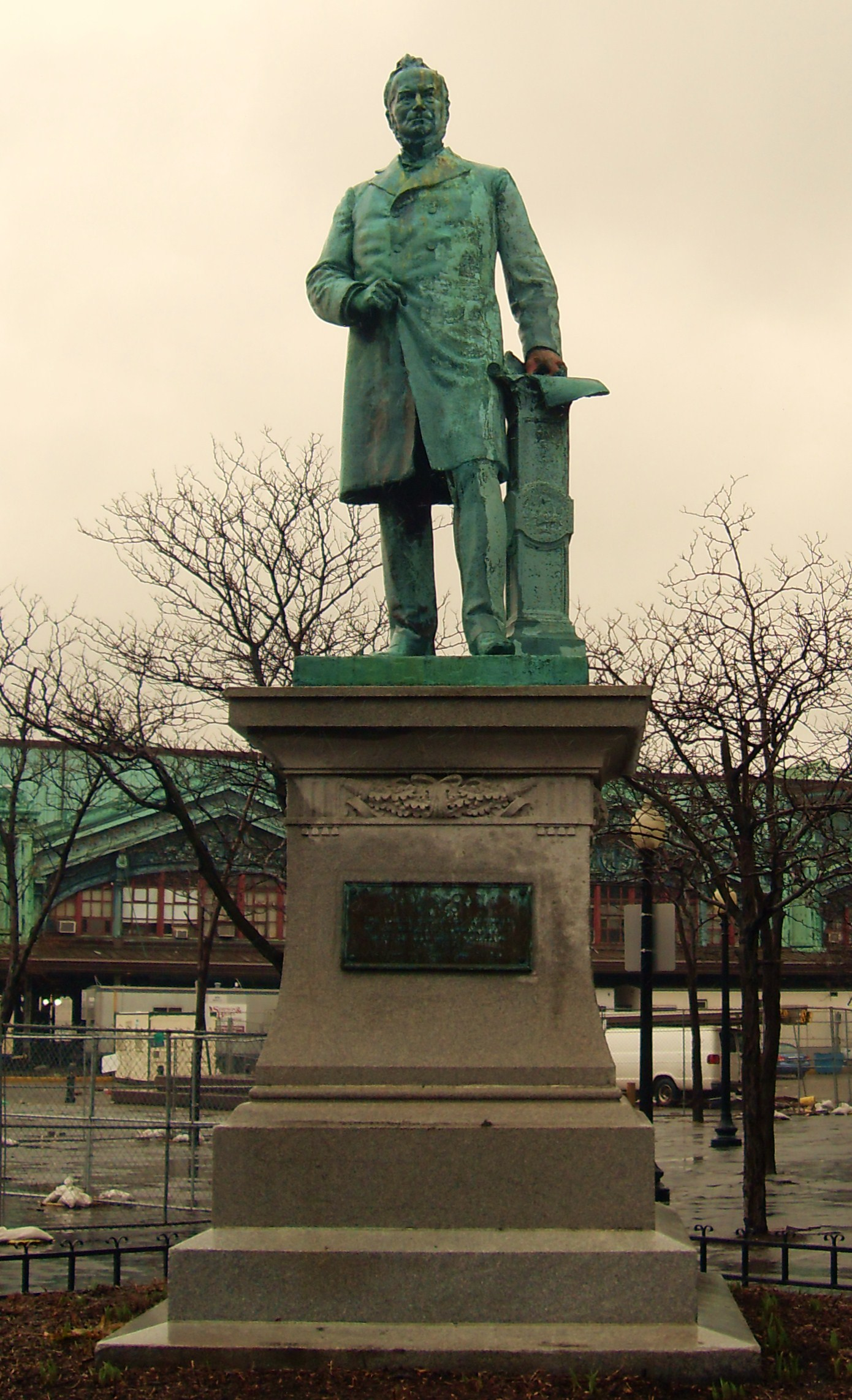
Statue of Sam Sloan, and his ferry station in Hoboken

== Legacy ==
Samuel Sloan is the eponym of the city of Sloan, Iowa and the village of Sloan, New York.

Upon his daughter Margaret's 1883 marriage, he built "Wyndune" in Garrison as a wedding present for them near his own Garrison estate known as Oulagisket (later renamed Lisburne Grange by his son). Similarly, upon his daughter Elizabeth's 1887 marriage, he built "Walker House" in Garrison for them.

=== Statue ===
A statue memorializing Sloan was placed in Hoboken, New Jersey, originally facing the ferries in 1899. Some people criticized the statue's orientation, and the Mayor of Hoboken remarked that Sloan was "turning his back on the great city of Hoboken." On August 3, 1908, during the reconstruction of Hoboken Terminal, the statue was set facing both the town and the railroad and ferry stations.

The inscription reads:

SAM SLOAN

1817–1907
FOR THIRTY-TWO YEARS PRESIDENT
OF THE DELAWARE, LACKAWANA &
WESTERN RAILROAD COMPANY
1867–1899

PRESENTED BY JOHN HENRY STARIN

== See also ==
- List of railroad executives

New York State Senate
Preceded by Cyrus P. Smith	New York State Senate; 2nd District; 1858 – 1859	Succeeded by Thomas A. Gardiner
Business positions
Preceded by	President of Delaware, Lackawanna and Western Railroad; 1867 – 1899	Succeeded by William H. Truesdale
