= Pyne (Indian surname) =

Indian surname

- Language: Odiya, Bengali

Origin
- Language: Sanskrit
- Origin: South Asia

Other names
- Variant forms: Pain, Paine
- See also: Satapathy, Pathak, Mishra

Pyne (Bengali: পাইন) is an Indian surname. Alternative spellings include Paine and Pain.

- Bedabrata Pain (born 1963), Indian scientist and film producer
- Ganesh Pyne (1937–2013), Indian painter
- Satarupa Pyne, Indian model and actress
