= Percy Rivington Pyne I =

American businessman (1820–1895)

Percy Rivington Pyne
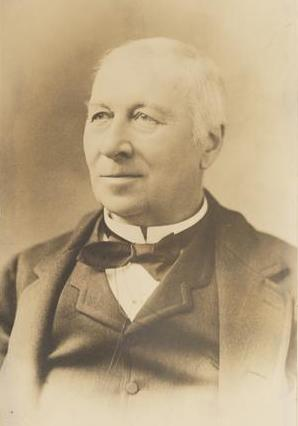
- Pyne c. 1875–90

President of National City Bank
- In office 1882–1891
- Preceded by: Moses Taylor
- Succeeded by: James Jewett Stillman

Personal details
- Born: March 8, 1820 England
- Died: February 14, 1895 (aged 74) Rome, Italy
- Spouse: Albertina Taylor (after 1855)
- Children: Percy Rivington Pyne II; Moses Taylor Pyne; Albertina Taylor Pyne

Percy Rivington Pyne I (March 8, 1820 – February 14, 1895) was a migrant from England to the United States. He was president of City National Bank, a director of the Delaware, Lackawanna and Western Railroad, and a director of the New Jersey Zinc Company.

== Early life ==
Percy Rivington Payne was born in England on March 8, 1820, to Anna Rivington and Thomas Pyne. He was a collateral descendant of James Rivington, famed Loyalist publisher in New York during the American Revolution.

Pyne was educated at Christ's Hospital boarding school (now in West Sussex) before emigrating to the United States in 1835.

== Career ==
Upon arriving in the United States, Pyne joined his father-in-law's business Moses Taylor & Co. as a clerk, becoming a partner in 1842. Moses Taylor & Co. specialized in the importation and sale of sugar, focusing on the Cuban trade. Pyne managed the sugar business while Taylor expanded the company into finance, iron, coal and railroads.

After the death of his father-in-law in 1882, Pyne became president of National City Bank, which was founded by Taylor in 1865, serving in that role until 1891 when he was succeeded by James Stillman.

== Personal life ==
In 1855, he married Moses Taylor's daughter Albertina. Their children included two sons and a daughter:

- Moses Taylor Pyne (1855–1921), who was a major philanthropist at Princeton University and who married Margaretta Stockton, granddaughter of General Robert Field Stockton.
- Percy Rivington Pyne II (1857–1929), who married Maud Howland, daughter of New York merchant Gardiner Greene Howland.
- Albertina Taylor Pyne (1859–1918), who married Archibald D. Russell.

Pyne died in Rome, Italy, on Valentine's Day, February 14, 1895.

=== Descendants ===
Through his son Percy, he was a grandfather of Grafton Howland Pyne (1890–1935); Herbert Rivington Pyne (1892–1952), who married Florence Ledyard Blair (daughter of banker C. Ledyard Blair); Mary Percy Pyne (b. 1893), who married Oliver Dwight Filley (a grandson of Oliver Filley and cousin of Dwight F. Davis); Percy Rivington Pyne Jr. (1896–1941), a flier with the 103rd Aero Squadron during World War I; and Meredith Howland Pyne (b. 1898).

Business positions
Preceded by Moses Taylor	President of National City Bank; 1882–1891	Succeeded by James Stillman
