= Valentine Pyne =

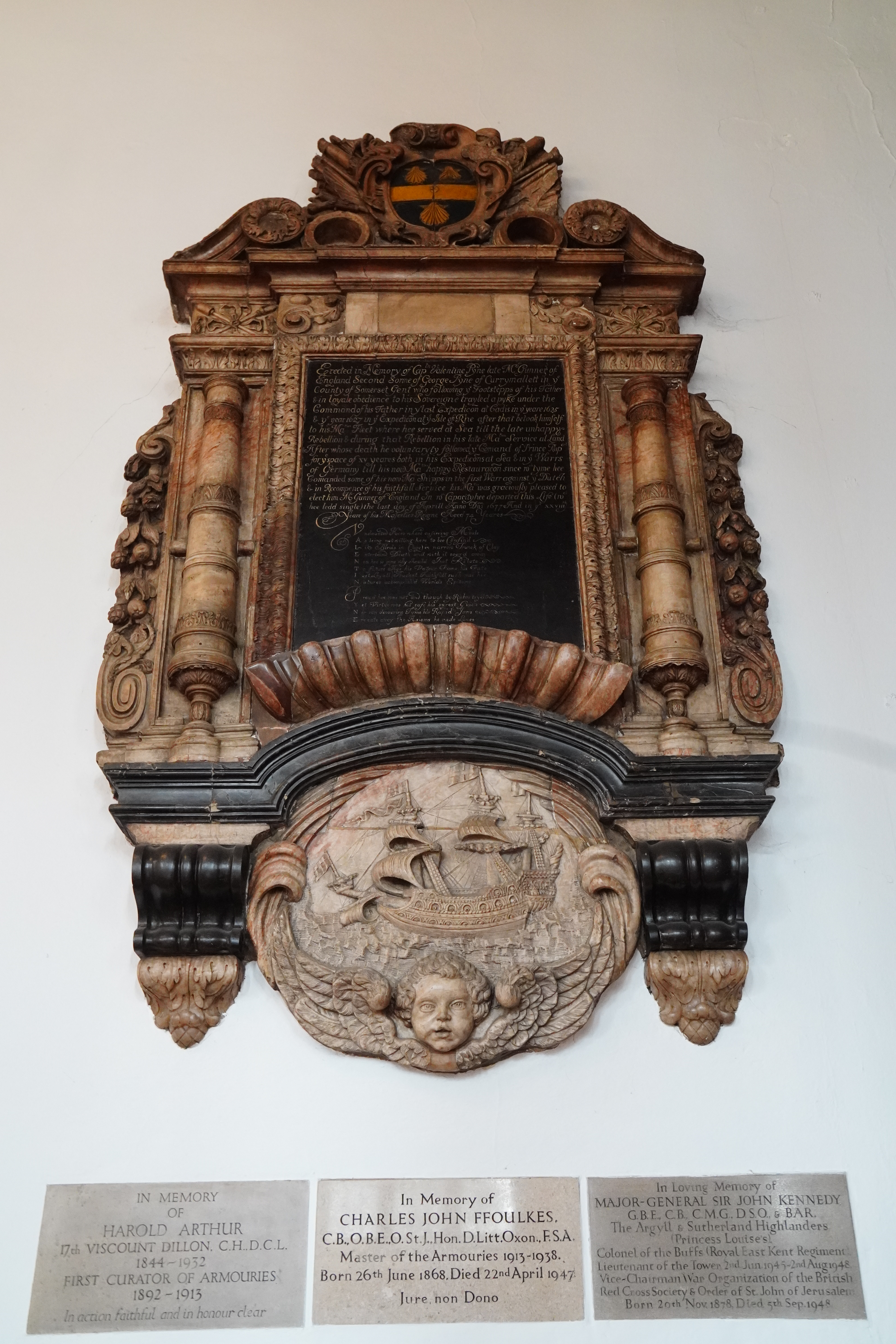
Memorial in the St. Peter ad Vincula chapel, London

Valentine Pyne (1603-1677) was master gunner of England, a companion of Prince Rupert of the Rhine following Royalist service in the English Civil War, and Lieutenant of the garrison at the Tower of London.

== Background and early career ==
Pyne was second son of George Pyne, of Curry Mallet, Somerset, of an established legal and gentry family, who served in the Royal Navy on the 1623 expedition to Cádiz; Valentine served under his father on this expedition. He was on the expedition to the Île de Ré in 1627, and continued to serve in the Navy until the outbreak of the English Civil War in 1642, during which he fought under Charles I. Following the king's execution, he accompanied Charles's nephew, Prince Rupert of the Rhine, for fifteen years fighting alongside him at sea and campaigns in Germany.

== Later career ==
At the Restoration, Charles II appointed Pyne lieutenant of the garrison at the Tower of London in 1661; he later served in the First Anglo-Dutch War as a Navy commander. In 1666, he succeeded Colonel James Weymes as master gunner of England, serving in this capacity until his death, unmarried, 30 April 1677.

A memorial stands to him at the Church of St Peter ad Vincula at the Tower of London, which emphasises his loyalty to King and country and makes note of his valour and virtuousness.
