= Samuel Gottscho =

American photographer

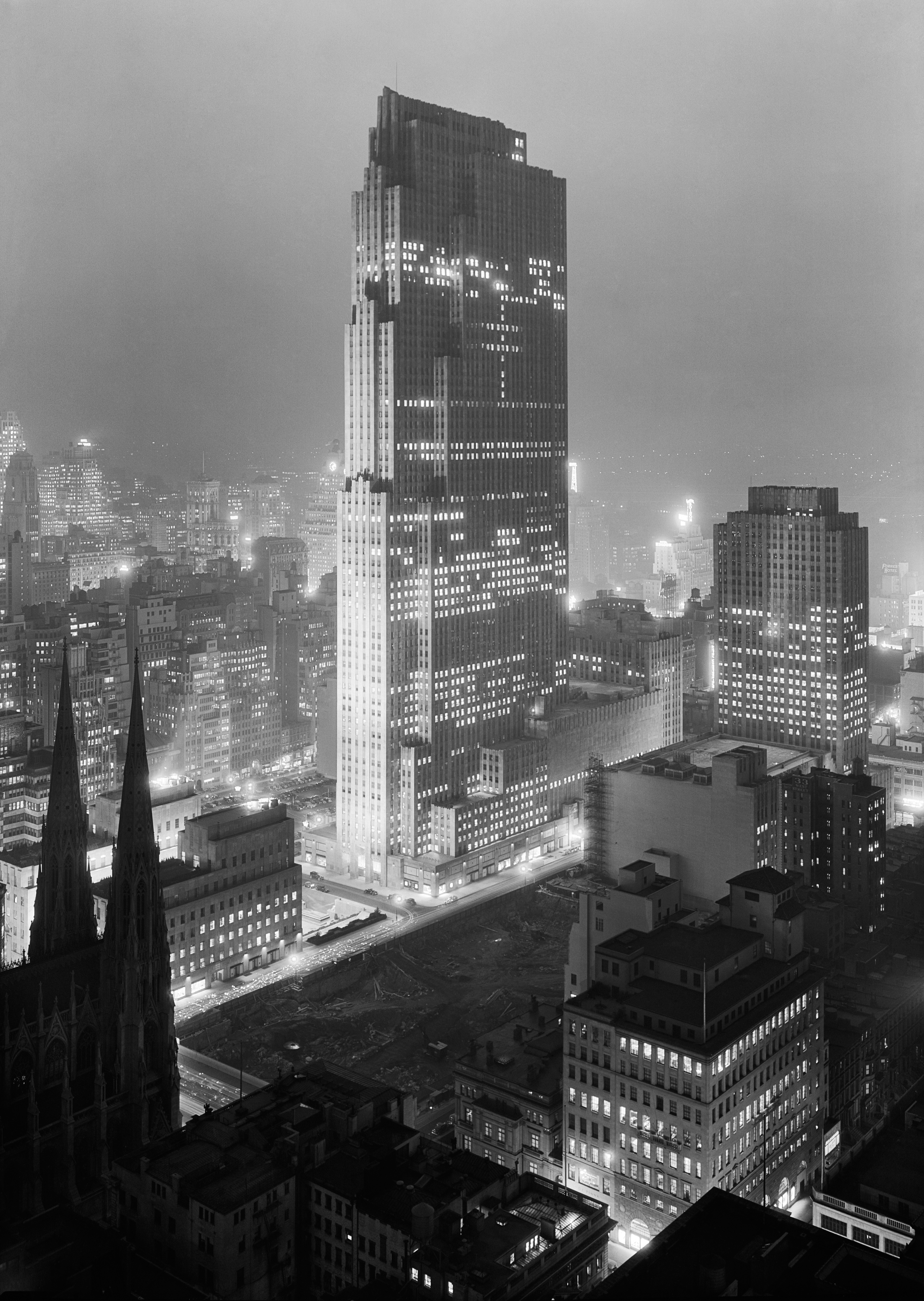
"Rockefeller Center and RCA Building from 515 Madison Ave.", c. 1933, by S.H. Gottscho, depicting the construction of Rockefeller Center

Samuel Herman Gottscho (February 8, 1875 – January 28, 1971) was an American architectural, landscape, and nature photographer.

Gottscho was born in Brooklyn in New York City. He acquired his first camera in 1896 and took his first photograph at Coney Island. From 1896 to 1920 he photographed part-time, specializing in houses and gardens, as he particularly enjoyed nature, rural life, and landscapes.

After attending several architectural photograph exhibitions, Gottscho decided to perfect and improve his own work and sought out several architects and landscape architects. After twenty-three years as a traveling lace and fabric salesman, Gottscho became a professional commercial photographer at the age of 50. His son-in-law William Schleisner joined Gottscho in his business in 1935. During this time his photographs appeared in and on the covers of American Architect and Architecture, Architectural Record. His portraits and architectural photography regularly appeared in articles in the New York Times. His photographs of private homes in the New York and Connecticut suburbs often appeared in home decoration magazines. From the early 1940s to the late 1960s, he was a regular contributor to the Times of illustrated articles on wildflowers.

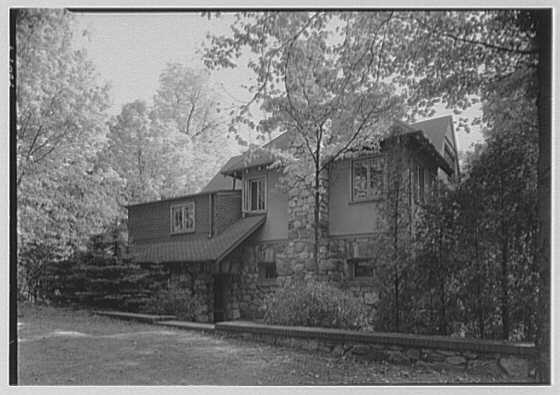
" Irving Hartley, residence on Cat Rock Rd., Cos Cob, Connecticut", by S.H. Gottscho

Gottscho believed he created some of his best work at the age of 70. In 1967, his botanical work won him the New York Botanical Garden's Distinguished Service Medal. He died in Jamaica, Queens, New York.

Approximately 29,000 of his images are held in the Gottscho-Schleisner collection at the United States Library of Congress. Additionally, over 40,000 are held by the Museum of the City of New York, where an exhibition of his work titled "The Mythic City: Photographs of New York by Samuel H. Gottscho, 1925-1940," opened in November 2005. A third major archive of his work is held by Avery Architectural and Fine Arts Library at Columbia University.

== Publications ==
- Manhattan 1933
- A pocket guide to wildflowers: How to identify and enjoy them 1951
- Architectural and Decorative Features of St. Bartholomew's Church in the City of New York 1941
- A portfolio of views of the New York World's Fair of 1939 1939
- Wild-Flower Bounty from a L.I. Bog by Samuel H. Gottscho. New York Times: Jul 31, 1966
- MAY GARDENS by Samuel H. Gottscho. New York Times: May 4, 1941

== Bibliography ==
- More than 5,000 photographs by Samuel H. Gottscho from the collections of the Museum of the City of New York
- Artnet
- Library of Congress
- Lee Gallery
- The Mythic City: Photographs of New York by Samuel H. Gottscho, 1925-1940, Donald Albrecht, Princeton 2005, ISBN 1-56898-562-2
- New York: Capital of Photography, Max Kozloff, Yale 2002, ISBN 0-300-09445-0
- HWWilsonweb.com Database: Art Retrospective
- Obituary Camera (English Edition) v. 50 (March 1971) p. 54 ISSN 0366-7073
- The Man and the Myth by Donald Albrecht in Interior Design, NYC, v.76 no.11 Sept. 2005
- Social Security Death Index
- Obituary, New York Times January 29, 1971
- "Samuel Gottsho Photographer Dies" New York Times, January 29, 1971
