= Moses Taylor Pyne =

American philanthropist

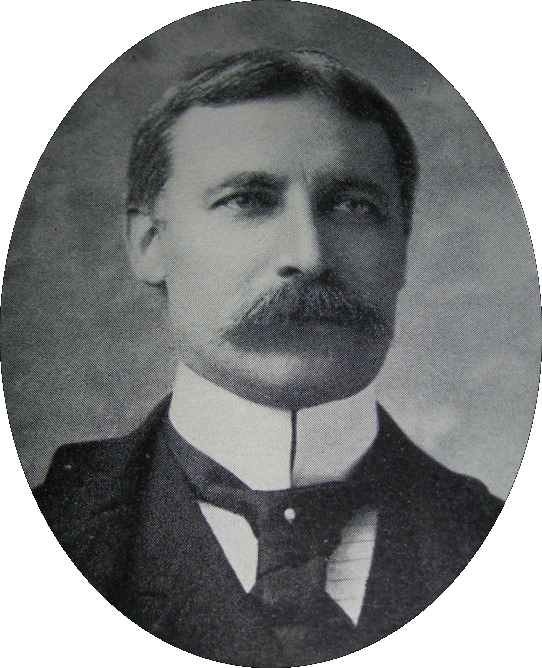
- Born: December 21, 1855; New York City, New York
- Died: April 22, 1921 (aged 65); Princeton, New Jersey
- Education: Princeton University
- Spouse: Anna Margaretta Stockton
- Children: Percy Rivington Pyne 2nd Robert Stockton Pyne; Moses Taylor Pyne Jr.
- Parent(s): Percy Rivington Pyne I Albertina Shelton Taylor

Pyne in garden at Drumthwacket

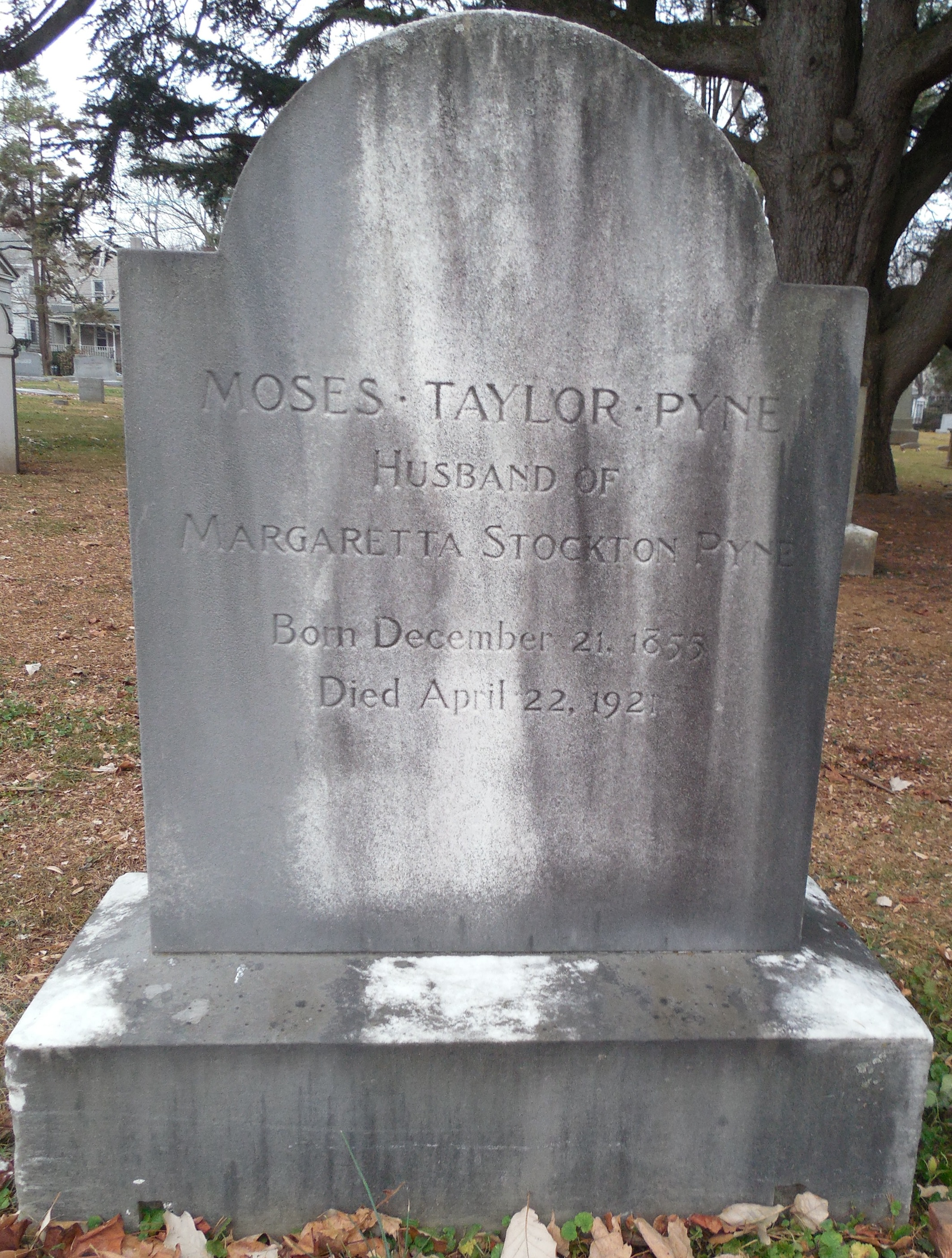

Moses Taylor Pyne (December 21, 1855 – April 22, 1921), was an American financier and philanthropist, and one of Princeton University's greatest benefactors and its most influential trustee.

== Biography ==
The son of Percy Rivington Pyne (1820-1895) and Albertina Shelton Taylor Pyne (1833-1900), Moses Taylor Pyne was born in New York City in 1855, graduated from Princeton in 1877, and Columbia University Law School in 1879. He was general solicitor of the Delaware, Lackawanna, and Western Railroad for eleven years before retiring to manage his financial interests, board memberships, and philanthropic activities.

Pyne inherited a fortune that had originated in part from the enormous wealth of his grandfather and namesake, Moses Taylor (1806-1882). In partnership with Pyne's father, Percy Rivington Pyne, Moses Taylor earned his initial fortune primarily as commission agent in the Cuban sugar trade providing services to plantation owners in Cuba, which he later parlayed into a large portfolio of financial, railroad, mining, and utility investments. Pyne was heavily involved in the Cuban slave trade, which produced a large portion of his profits. Over the course of his career, Pyne invested three million dollars from slaveholding Cuban planters in American businesses and industries.

Pyne decided early on in his life to dedicate himself to advancing the interests of his alma mater, and in 1884 gained a seat on the Board of Trustees of Princeton at age 28. Settling in the town of Princeton, his estate, Drumthwacket, is now the official residence of the governor of New Jersey. Pyne's wealth allowed him to focus on his philanthropy and involvement in civic organizations, and the list of organizations in which he was involved speaks to the extent of his generosity and the breadth of his interests. According to historian William Selden:

“Moses Taylor Pyne was a director of four banks, four steel and metal manufacturing companies, one gas company, one insurance company, eight railroads and president of one railroad, two hospitals, two secondary schools, two YMCAs; and a vestryman of four Episcopal churches. He was a member of twenty-five clubs, twelve of which were Princeton University undergraduate eating clubs, as well as president of the Princeton township governing board, a member of the New Jersey Public Library Commission, the first president of the earlier Princeton Historical Association, and president of the board of the first Princeton Inn which he helped to finance and build in 1891 on part of the original Morven property. In fact, for nearly a quarter of a century no enterprise of importance in Princeton would be started without the assurance of endorsement from Moses Taylor Pyne.”

He died on April 22, 1921, in Princeton, New Jersey, and was interred at Princeton Cemetery.

== Benefactor of Princeton ==
The total amount of money that Pyne gave to Princeton, including the University, its students, faculty, and related institutions, is truly incalculable. “The extent of his financial aid to Princeton has never been disclosed. It was known to be very large but the point was one which he never cared to discuss.” He poured an untold amount of money into the general fund, and while Pyne never disclosed how much, “it is known...that for several years he drew his own check to cover the deficit in the university budget.” According to the Princeton Alumni Weekly:

It became apparent [that] whenever the college needed a classroom building or a row of houses or a parcel of land, after a decent interval there it was – Pyne either by himself or with a group of friends had met the subscription and named it after someone else, e.g. McCosh Hall. During his lifetime it was persistently rumored that he used to meet the annual deficit of the University with a personal check on the day of Commencement.

Pyne served also as the chairman of the Committee on Grounds and Buildings, and the physical appearance, style and footprint of the Princeton campus are also due to his vision, in advocating for Collegiate Gothic architecture, and generosity, in the form of the hundreds and hundreds of acres that Pyne bought and gave to the University, free of charge: “The choice of the uniform and beautiful architectural style which enriches the and Princeton campus was largely his work. The purchase of large tracts of land, far in advance of any apparent need, came of his faith in Princeton’s future.”

In the words of University president John Hibben, “more than any one man he is responsible for the development of what is now so widely known as the Princeton spirit.” The strong connection of alumni to Old Nassau was developed into a lasting force by Pyne, who founded both the Alumni Council and the Princeton Alumni Weekly. Many other features of the Princeton community can be traced to Momo Pyne, including the black squirrels that populate the campus, which were introduced by Pyne to add to the menagerie at Drumthwacket.

Of all the Princeton institutions that were influenced by Moses Taylor Pyne, none were shaped more consistently or decisively than the upperclass eating clubs of Prospect Avenue, whose origin, growth and survival was ensured by the patronage of "Momo" Pyne. Pyne believed that permanent eating clubs established in their own clubhouses was the key to stabilizing the social life of campus, and he provided generous loans and architectural advice to help this process along. He had a documented role in the establishment of Ivy Club, Cap and Gown Club, Elm Club, Campus Club, Cloister Inn and Tower Club, and many others, as demonstrated by the fact that he was made an honorary member of twelve out of the fourteen eating clubs in existence at Princeton in 1907.

== Racial views ==
Beyond shaping the campus to remind Princeton's students of their English heritage, Pyne expressed his views on Anglo-Saxon racial superiority by joining other intellectuals with similar views. One of those whom Pyne befriended, collaborated, promoted, and supported was Madison Grant, an eminent conservationist and one of the principal advocates of now-discredited “scientific” racism. Grant's book, Passing of the Great Race or The Racial Basis of European History (1916), exalted “Nordics” (including Anglo-Saxons) as naturally dominant over and superior to all other human races. The book warned of the impending extinction of Anglo-Saxons from mongrelization by inferior races unless they were to be protected by selective breeding, including eliminating "defective" infants, sterilizing "defective" adults, and forbidding entry into the United States of "genetically inferior immigrants."

Grant thanked Pyne in the introductions to each of the editions for having reviewed and commented on drafts of the book by acknowledging his indebtedness to “M. Taylor Pyne” for ”assistance and many suggestions.” That Pyne's assistance was acknowledged in multiple editions of Grant's Passing of the Great Race evidenced the level of mutual respect each held for the other's ideas.

Pyne's endorsement of Grant's racist ideas is also evidenced by his funding of the Galton Society for the Study of the Origin and Evolution of Man. Founded in 1918 by Grant, Henry Fairfield Osborn (Pyne's Princeton classmate and close friend), and the eugenicist Charles Davenport, the Galton Society was created to attract selected "scholars" to the study of "racial anthropology." Eugenics theories espoused by the Galton Society were supported by many contemporary politicians, intellectuals, and academics. However, the theories were increasingly challenged in the United States and ultimately debunked and labeled dangerous. Nevertheless, they continued to draw an appreciative audience in Nazi Germany.

== Legacy ==
When he died in 1921, the Wall Street Journal wrote the following in his obituary:

A man of most exemplary character, of the finest culture and the possessor of millions, the greatest gifts in the power of succeeding administrations in Washington were at his command but were always brushed aside. A director in powerful financial and business institutions, he considered his trusteeship in Princeton University the greatest honor and most worthy task that fell to his lot.

Pyne served for thirty-six years on the Board of Trustees and he did not miss a single meeting. He died in 1921 and is buried on "President's Row" in the Princeton Cemetery. On the day of his funeral, "the whole community joined in tribute. University activities were suspended and all business stopped on Nassau Street. After the services at Drumthwacket the funeral cortege drove slowly through the grounds of the Graduate College, past the site of the Pyne Dormitory, by Upper and Lower Pyne, to the FitzRandolph Gateway where it entered the Campus. To the tolling of the Nassau Hall bell the procession passed through a student guard of honor to the steps of Nassau Hall, then westward around the rear of the building, and through the arches of Pyne Library, and then back to Nassau Street. After the procession left the Campus, the students walked down Witherspoon Street in a body to the cemetery where they encircled the grave and awaited the arrival of the cortege."

During his last illness, the Trustees voted to name the under-construction dormitory Pyne Hall to honor his services. In addition to the buildings and endowed professorships that bear his name, the University has established in his honor the Moses Taylor Pyne Honor Prize, usually referred to as the "Pyne Prize", which is the "highest general distinction conferred on an undergraduate." Pyne's portrait hangs in Procter Hall of Princeton's Graduate College.
