= Percy Rivington Pyne Jr. =

US Air Force pilot (1896–1941)

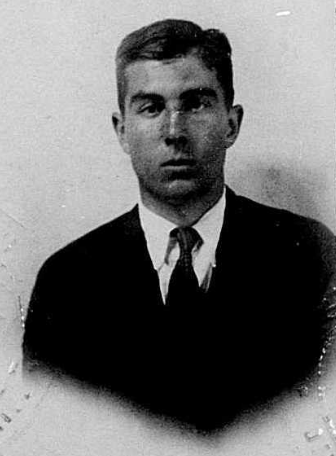
- Pyne in 1919
- Born: November 9, 1896; Tuxedo Park, New York
- Died: December 9, 1941 (aged 45); Manhattan, New York City
- Education: Princeton University (1918)
- Parent(s): Percy Rivington Pyne II; Maud Howland

Percy Rivington Pyne Jr. (November 9, 1896 – December 9, 1941) was an American fighter pilot who fought in World War I.

== Biography ==
He was born on November 9, 1896, in Tuxedo Park, New York, to Percy Rivington Pyne II and Maud Howland.

He entered Princeton University with the class of 1918. He was a pioneer of the Princeton Aviation School and left before graduating to join the American Expeditionary Force.

Pyne was awarded the Distinguished Service Cross for extraordinary heroism in action while serving with 103d Aero Squadron, 3d Pursuit Group, U.S. Army Air Service, A.E.F., near Dun-sur-Meuse, France, 23 October 1918.

After the war Pyne returned to Princeton to complete his studies and received a B.A. degree. He then went to New College, Oxford and received the degrees of Bachelor of Arts and Master of Arts.

Pyne died on December 9, 1941, in Manhattan, New York City, at the age of 45 after a long illness. He was buried in Woodlawn Cemetery.
