= Moses Taylor =

American banker (1806–1882)

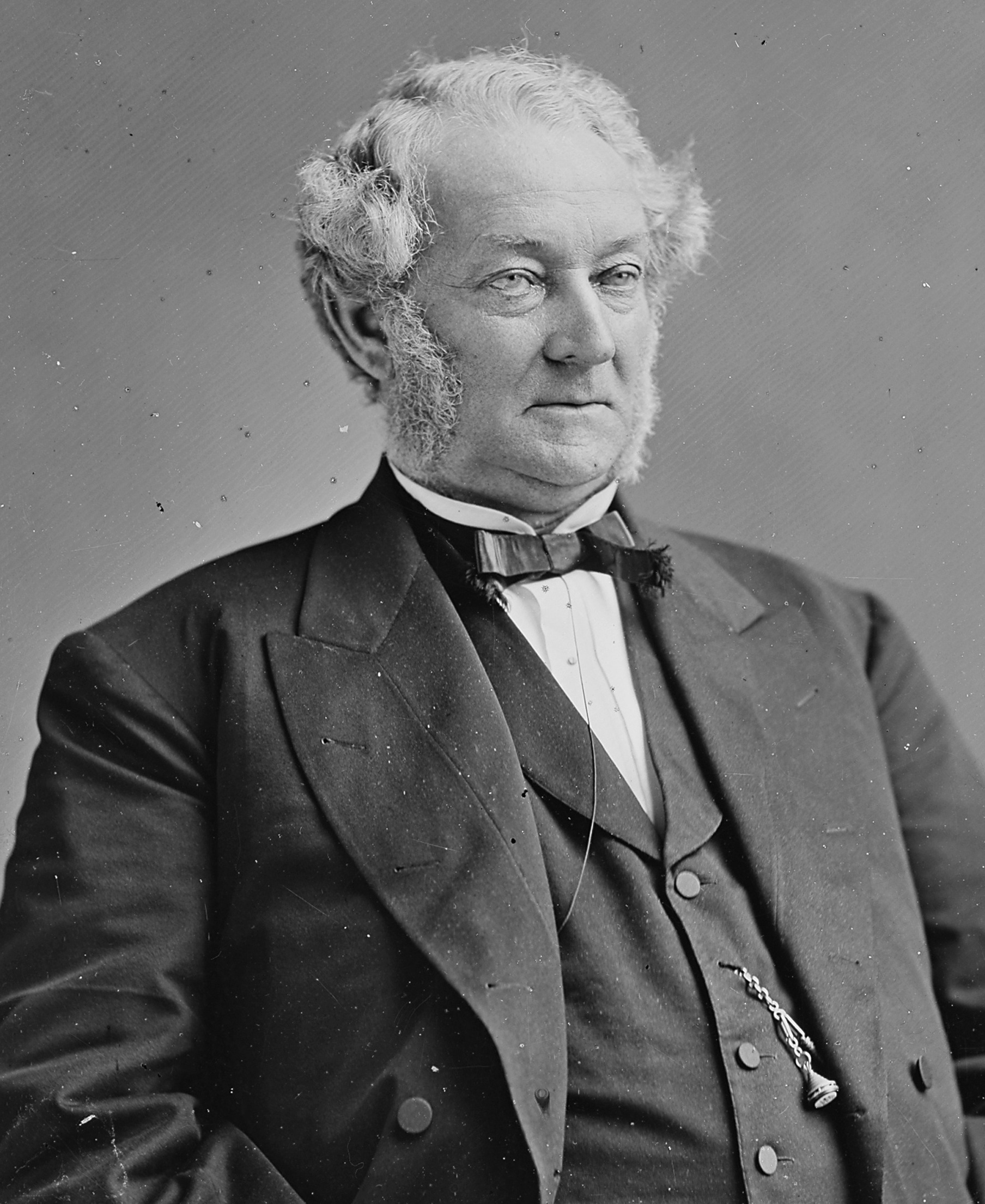

President of National City Bank
- In office 1855–1882
- Preceded by: Gorham A. Worth
- Succeeded by: Percy Pyne

Personal details
- Born: January 11, 1806
- Died: May 23, 1882 (aged 76)
- Spouse: Catharine Anne Wilson (m. 1833)
- Relations: Moses Taylor Pyne (grandson); Hamilton Fish Kean (grandson-in-law)
- Children: 5

Moses Taylor (January 11, 1806 – May 23, 1882) was a 19th-century New York merchant and banker and one of the wealthiest men of that century. At his death, his estate was reported to be worth $70 million ($2.3 billion in 2025). He controlled the National City Bank of New York (later to become Citibank), the Delaware, Lackawanna & Western railroad, and the Moses Taylor & Co. import business, and he held numerous other investments in railroads and industry.

== Early life ==
Taylor was born on January 11, 1806, to Jacob B. Taylor and Martha (née Brant) Taylor. His father was a close associate of John Jacob Astor and acted as his agent by purchasing New York real estate while concealing Astor's interest. Astor's relationship with the Taylor family provided Moses with an early advantage.

== Career ==
At age 15, Taylor began working at J. D. Brown shippers. He soon moved to a clerk's position in the firm of Gardiner Greene Howland and Samuel Howland's firm G. G. & S. Howland Company of New York, a shipping and import firm that traded with South America.

By 1832, at age 26, Taylor had sufficient wealth to marry, leave the Howland company, and start his own business as a sugar broker. As such he dealt with Cuban sugar growers, found buyers for their product, exchanged currency, and advised and assisted them with their investments. He nurtured relationships with those planters, who relied on him for loans and investments to support their plantations. Taylor never visited Cuba, but his friendship with Henry Augustus Coit, a prominent trader who was fluent in Spanish, enabled him to trade with the Cuban growers. Taylor soon discovered that loans and investments provided returns that were as good as, or better than, those from the sugar business, although the sugar trade remained a core source of income. By the 1840s his income was largely from interest and investments. By 1847, Taylor was listed as one of New York City's 25 millionaires.

=== Banking and investments ===
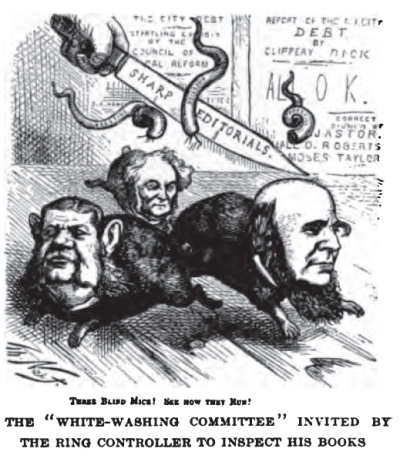
Thomas Nast cartoon of the "White-washing Committee" (L–R: Astor, Taylor, Marshall O. Roberts)

When the Panic of 1837 allowed Astor to take over what was then City Bank of New York (today known as Citibank), he named Taylor as director. Taylor himself had doubled his fortune during the panic, and brought his growing financial connections to the bank. He acquired equity in the bank and in 1855 became its president, operating it largely in support of his and his associates' businesses and investments.

In the 1850s Taylor invested in iron and coal, and began purchasing interest in the Delaware, Lackawanna & Western railroad. When the Panic of 1857 brought the railroad to the brink of bankruptcy, Taylor obtained control by purchasing its outstanding shares for $5 a share. Within seven years the shares became worth $240, and the D. L. & W was one of the premier railroads of the country. By 1865 Taylor held 20,000 shares worth almost $50 million.

Taylor held an interest in the New York, Newfoundland, and London Telegraph Company that Cyrus West Field had founded in 1854. After several failed attempts to lay the first transatlantic telegraph cable it was successful in 1866.

Taylor also had controlling interest in the largest two of the seven gas companies in Manhattan, which were merged (after his death) to form the Consolidated Gas Company in 1884, eventually becoming Consolidated Edison. Taylor's Manhattan Gas Company and New York Gas Light Company were represented 45% of the merged Consolidated Gas, and his descendants remained some the largest individual shareholders of Consolidated Edison.

=== Tammany Hall ===
After the Civil War, during which he assisted the Union with financing its war debt, he continued to invest in iron, railroads, and real estate. His real estate holdings in New York brought him into close association with political power broker Boss Tweed of New York's Tammany Hall. Taylor sat in 1871 on a committee made up of New York's most influential and successful businessmen and signed his name to a report that commended Tweed's controller for his honesty and integrity. This report was considered a notorious whitewash.

== Personal life ==
Taylor was married to Catharine Anne Wilson (1810–1892). Together, they were the parents of:

- Albertina Shelton Taylor (1833–1900), who married Percy Rivington Pyne (1820–1895) in 1855. Pyne, an assistant to Moses, became president of City Bank upon Moses' death.
- Mary Taylor (1837–1907), who married George Lewis (1833–1888)
- George Campbell Taylor (1837–1907)
- Katherine Wilson Taylor (1839–1925), who married Robert Winthrop
- Henry Augustus Coit Taylor (1841–1921), who married Charlotte Talbot Fearing (1845–1899) in 1868. After her death, he married Josephine Whitney Johnson (1849–1927) in 1903. Taylor left an estate worth $50 million upon his death in 1921, just a few months before the death of his nephew Moses Taylor Pyne.

Taylor died in 1882 and although he owned a vault at the New York City Marble Cemetery that already contained members of his family, he was buried in Green-Wood Cemetery in Brooklyn, New York City. He left his fortune to his wife and children. Many of the Taylor family descendants were prominent in New York and Newport society and several prominent families of the early 20th century owed a substantial portion of their fortunes to the Taylor inheritances.

=== Descendants ===
Through his daughter Albertina, the Pyne family became a dynasty of bankers that survives to this day. Percy's son Moses Taylor Pyne was a benefactor of Princeton University who supported its development from a college into a university and left an estate worth $100 million at his death in 1921.

Through his daughter Katherine, he was the grandfather-in-law of Hamilton Fish Kean (1862–1941), ancestor of the political Kean family which includes the former governor of New Jersey Thomas Kean.

== Legacy ==
Not noted for philanthropy during his life, at its end in 1882 Taylor donated $250,000 to build a hospital in Scranton, Pennsylvania, to benefit his iron and coal workers, and workers of the D. L. & W railroad. The Moses Taylor hospital continues in operation today.

Business positions
Preceded by Gorham A. Worth	President of National City Bank; 1855–1882	Succeeded by Percy Pyne
