= List of historic places in Charlotte County, New Brunswick =

Designated historical buildings in the county excluding those in St. Andrews

This article is a list of historic places in Charlotte County, New Brunswick entered on the Canadian Register of Historic Places, whether they are federal, provincial, or municipal. For listings in St. Andrews, see List of historic places in St. Andrews, New Brunswick.

== List of historic places outside St. Andrews ==
Name	Address	Coordinates	Government recognition (CRHP №)	Wikidata ID	Image
Axe Factory	Prince William Street; St. Stephen NB	45°11′31″N 67°15′34″W	St. Stephen municipality (10614)	Q137915730	Upload Photo
Bancroft House	30 Bancroft Road; Grand Manan NB	44°43′14″N 66°47′39″W	Grand Manan municipality (15837)	Q137915808	Upload Photo
The Barn	1199 Route 776; Grand Manan NB	44°41′06″N 66°46′17″W	Grand Manan municipality (16162)	Q137915339	More images
David Bartlett Block	17 King Street; St. Stephen NB	45°11′36″N 67°16′32″W	St. Stephen municipality (10723)	Q137915909	Upload Photo
Blair House	38 Prince William Street; St. Stephen NB	45°11′37″N 67°16′15″W	St. Stephen municipality (8736)	Q137915930	Upload Photo
John Boynton House	348 Dock Road; Grand Manan NB	44°43′48″N 66°46′42″W	Grand Manan municipality (16503)	Q137915959	Upload Photo
Bridge Superintendent's House	21 South Street; St. George NB	45°07′37″N 66°49′38″W	St. George municipality (10645)	Q137915981	Upload Photo
Caswell House	456 Milltown Blvd. St. Stephen NB	45°10′21″N 67°17′47″W	St. Stephen municipality (8451)	Q137915986	Upload Photo
Christ Church Anglican Church	30 Prince William Street; St. Stephen NB	45°11′38″N 67°16′19″W	New Brunswick (2580)		Upload Photo
Church of Ascension	6 Cemetery Lane; Grand Manan NB	44°45′58″N 66°45′28″W	Grand Manan municipality (15785)	Q137918087	Upload Photo
Dark Harbour Pond	Dark Harbour Road; Grand Manan NB	44°44′48″N 66°50′18″W	Grand Manan municipality (15789)	Q137918124	More images
Deep Cove School	1141 Route 776; Grand Manan NB	44°41′09″N 66°45′51″W	Grand Manan municipality (16331)	Q137915390	More images
DeWolfe House	64 Union Street; St. Stephen NB	45°11′40″N 67°16′58″W	St. Stephen municipality (7630)	Q137918226	Upload Photo
Dinsmore Hardware Building	63 King Street; St. Stephen NB	45°11′40″N 67°16′30″W	St. Stephen municipality (10710)	Q137918253	Upload Photo
Dover Hill Park	270 Milltown Blvd. St. Stephen NB	45°11′26″N 67°17′14″W	St. Stephen municipality (7693)	Q137918278	Upload Photo
Pierre Dugua de Mons Habitation	Route 127; Bayside NB	45°07′56″N 67°07′00″W	New Brunswick (6636)		
Dyas House	40 Union Street; St. Stephen NB	45°11′39″N 67°16′47″W	St. Stephen municipality (7643)		Upload Photo
Eaton Building	457 Milltown Blvd. St. Stephen NB	45°10′24″N 67°17′50″W	St. Stephen municipality (10726)		Upload Photo
Henry Eaton House	13 Murchie Avenue; St. Stephen NB	45°10′17″N 67°17′45″W	St. Stephen municipality (8959)		Upload Photo
Elim Lodge	477 Milltown Blvd. St. Stephen NB	45°10′19″N 67°17′51″W	St. Stephen municipality (7702)		Upload Photo
Ensor House	15 Marks Street; St. Stephen NB	45°11′37″N 67°16′42″W	St. Stephen municipality (9016)		Upload Photo
First Community Cemetery	28 Main Street; St. George NB	45°07′49″N 66°49′20″W	St. George municipality (10678)		Upload Photo
Former Calais-St. Stephen Street Railway Site	Milltown Boulevard, West Street, Scoodic Street, King Street, Prince William Street; St. Stephen NB	45°10′14″N 67°17′50″W	St. Stephen municipality (16274)		Upload Photo
Former Canadian Pacific Railway Station	3 King Street; St. Stephen NB	45°11′33″N 67°16′31″W	St. Stephen municipality (9954)	Q137915652	More images
Former Lightkeeper's Residence	Grand Manan NB	44°30′37″N 66°46′53″W	Federal (7874)		
Former Site of the Milne-Coutts & Co. Granite Shed	8 South Street; St. George NB	45°07′39″N 66°49′33″W	St. George municipality (10644)		Upload Photo
Fort Hill Cannons	4 New Street; St. George NB	45°07′47″N 66°49′21″W	St. George municipality (10630)		Upload Photo
Frink House	18 Union St. St. Stephen NB	45°11′39″N 67°16′38″W	St. Stephen municipality (7649)		Upload Photo
Senator Gillmor House	8 Main Street; St. George NB	45°07′47″N 66°49′26″W	St. George municipality (8979)		Upload Photo
Government of Canada Building	North Head; Grand Manan NB	44°45′52″N 66°44′59″W	Federal (9482)		Upload Photo
Government of Canada Building	Portage and Main Street; St. George NB	45°07′47″N 66°49′30″W	Federal (2971)		Upload Photo
Grant Residence	7 Linton Lane; Grand Manan NB	44°44′16″N 66°45′25″W	Grand Manan municipality (16841)		Upload Photo
Granville Park	Prince William Street; St. Stephen NB	45°11′33″N 67°16′03″W	St. Stephen municipality (8441)		Upload Photo
Greco Pizza Building	61 Milltown Boulevard; St. Stephen NB	45°11′33″N 67°16′43″W	St. Stephen municipality (10610)		Upload Photo
Guay House	442 Milltown Blvd. St. Stephen NB	45°10′27″N 67°17′46″W	St. Stephen municipality (9009)		Upload Photo
Head Harbour Light Station	Wilsons Beach NB	44°57′28″N 66°53′59″W	New Brunswick (6537)	Q28375901	More images
Hibbard House	16 South Street; St. George NB	45°07′38″N 66°49′35″W	St. George municipality (6014)		Upload Photo
Hiland House	23 Hawthorne St. St. Stephen NB	45°11′38″N 67°17′20″W	St. Stephen municipality (13801)		Upload Photo
Hon. George Stillman Hill Home	90 King Street; St. Stephen NB	45°11′43″N 67°16′31″W	St. Stephen municipality (7652)		Upload Photo
Holy Rosary Catholic Church	5 Rose Street; St. Stephen NB	45°11′41″N 67°17′00″W	St. Stephen municipality (9940)		Upload Photo
Indian Beach	Grand Manan NB	44°47′12″N 66°48′35″W	Grand Manan municipality (16300)		Upload Photo
James Lawson House	146 Route 776; Grand Manan NB	44°45′56″N 66°45′40″W	Grand Manan municipality (16390)		Upload Photo
Light Tower	Gannet Rock; Grand Manan NB	44°30′36″N 66°46′52″W	Federal (4738)	Q28791986	More images
Green's Point Lighthouse	Green's Point Road; St. George NB	45°02′19″N 66°53′29″W	Federal (3673)	Q136685572	More images
Lighthouse	Lighthouse Road; Grand Manan NB	44°45′51″N 66°43′57″W	Federal (4735)	Q28375027	More images
Little Acres Community Residence	10 Prince William Street; St. Stephen NB	45°11′38″N 67°16′27″W	St. Stephen municipality (8752)		Upload Photo
Long Eddy Point Lighthouse	438 Whistle Road; Grand Manan NB	44°47′59″N 66°47′08″W	Federal (21093)	Q30069009	More images
Lonicera Hall	28 Union Street; St. Stephen NB	45°11′39″N 67°16′41″W	St. Stephen municipality (7663)		Upload Photo
Loyalist Burial Ground	King Street; St. Stephen NB	45°11′47″N 67°16′27″W	St. Stephen municipality (8763)		Upload Photo
Loyalist Landing	Chocolate Park, Milltown Blvd. St. Stephen NB	45°11′32″N 67°16′42″W	St. Stephen municipality (8353)		Upload Photo
Machias Seal Island Lighthouse	Machias Seal Island; Grand Manan NB	44°30′06″N 67°06′07″W	Federal (3605, (21059)	Q21030715	More images
Marathon Inn	19 Marathon Lane; Grand Manan NB	44°45′57″N 66°44′56″W	Grand Manan municipality (16393)		Upload Photo
Col. Nehemiah Marks Home	39 Prince William Street; St. Stephen NB	45°11′35″N 67°16′13″W	St. Stephen municipality (8733)		Upload Photo
McAllister Building	36 Milltown Blvd. St. Stephen NB	45°11′33″N 67°16′39″W	St. Stephen municipality (9001)		Upload Photo
McConkey House	17 Union Street; St. Stephen NB	45°11′41″N 67°16′38″W	St. Stephen municipality (8951)		Upload Photo
Henry McLaughlin House	2232 Route 776; Grand Manan NB	44°37′30″N 66°51′41″W	Grand Manan municipality (16403)		Upload Photo
Milltown United Church	345 Milltown Boulevard; St. Stephen NB	45°10′23″N 67°17′47″W	New Brunswick (2306)		Upload Photo
John Warren Moore Home	13 Union Street; St. Stephen NB	45°11′41″N 67°16′36″W	New Brunswick (5737), St. Stephen municipality (13075)		Upload Photo
Theodore Moore House	75 Boundary Street; St. Stephen NB	45°11′32″N 67°17′54″W	St. Stephen municipality (8956)		Upload Photo
James Simpson Murchie House	443 Milltown Blvd. St. Stephen NB	45°10′28″N 67°17′48″W	St. Stephen municipality (7671)	Q115130068	More images
Napa Auto Parts Building	16 King Street; St. Stephen NB	45°11′36″N 67°16′34″W	St. Stephen municipality (10724)		Upload Photo
Isaac Newton House	1120 Route 776; Grand Manan NB	44°41′16″N 66°45′44″W	Grand Manan municipality (15834)		Upload Photo
Nicholson House	27 Hawthorne Street; St. Stephen NB	45°11′39″N 67°17′20″W	St. Stephen municipality (9018)		Upload Photo
North Head School	130 Route 776; Grand Manan NB	44°45′57″N 66°45′32″W	Grand Manan municipality (16302)		Upload Photo
North Head Show Hall	126 Route 776; Grand Manan NB	44°45′57″N 66°45′27″W	Grand Manan municipality (15925)	Q137915402	More images
Old Ganong Candy Factory	73 Milltown Blvd. St. Stephen NB	45°11′34″N 67°16′46″W	St. Stephen municipality (8449)	Q130384113	More images
Old North Head Cemetery	6 Cemetery Lane; Grand Manan NB	44°45′58″N 66°45′26″W	Grand Manan municipality (15828)		Upload Photo
Old Pioneer Cemetery	Route 776; Grand Manan NB	44°41′02″N 66°46′34″W	Grand Manan municipality (15803)		Upload Photo
Old Pioneer Cemetery Extension	Foster Hill Road, between civic numbers 9 and 39; Grand Manan NB	44°41′05″N 66°46′40″W	Grand Manan municipality (15831)		Upload Photo
Old Power House	1071 Route 776; Grand Manan NB	44°41′21″N 66°45′27″W	Grand Manan municipality (15941)		Upload Photo
Old Seal Cove Cemetery	Route 776; Grand Manan NB	44°38′44″N 66°50′59″W	Grand Manan municipality (15826)		Upload Photo
Parsons Printing Building	8 King Street; St. Stephen NB	45°11′34″N 67°16′34″W	St. Stephen municipality (10616)		Upload Photo
Polkinhorn House	849 Route 776; Grand Manan NB	44°42′22″N 66°44′36″W	Grand Manan municipality (16386)		Upload Photo
Potter Cottage	6 Old Airport Road; Grand Manan NB	44°45′50″N 66°44′29″W	Grand Manan municipality (16502)		Upload Photo
Presbyterian Kirk	180 Brunswick Street; St. George NB	45°07′46″N 66°49′36″W	St. George municipality (10639)		Upload Photo
Richardson and Son Boat Building	Richardson Road; West Isles Parish NB	44°59′55″N 66°56′51″W	New Brunswick (8685)		Upload Photo
John B. Robinson House	53 Prince William Street; St. Stephen NB	45°11′34″N 67°16′05″W	St. Stephen municipality (7661)		Upload Photo
St. Croix Cotton Mill Site	5 Mill Lane; St. Stephen NB	45°10′33″N 67°17′41″W	St. Stephen municipality (10612)		Upload Photo
St. George Gorge at First Falls	Adjacent to 24 Mill Road; St. George NB	45°07′45″N 66°49′43″W	St. George municipality (6732)	Q130321684	More images
St. George Government of Canada Building	23 Portage Street; St. George NB	45°07′46″N 66°49′33″W	New Brunswick (10763)		Upload Photo
St. George Rural Cemetery	Cemetery Road; St. George NB	45°07′45″N 66°48′50″W	St. George municipality (10682)		Upload Photo
St. George Superior School Bell	1 School Street; St. George NB	45°07′46″N 66°49′19″W	St. George municipality (8966)		Upload Photo
St. Paul's Anglican Church	3 Ingalls Head Road; Grand Manan NB	44°41′01″N 66°46′27″W	Grand Manan municipality (15786)	Q137914208	More images
St. Stephen Post Office National Historic Site of Canada	34 Milltown Boulevard; St. Stephen NB	45°11′33″N 67°16′38″W	Federal (12544)	Q23190829	Upload Photo
St. Stephen's Roman Catholic Church	407 Milltown Blvd. St. Stephen NB	45°10′42″N 67°17′43″W	St. Stephen municipality (8338)	Q137915429	More images
St. Stephen Rural Cemetery	Hanson Road / Hayman Avenue; St. Stephen NB	45°12′03″N 67°18′06″W	St. Stephen municipality (8762)	Q7591795	Upload Photo
St. Stephen's University	8 Main Street; St. Stephen NB	45°11′35″N 67°16′55″W	St. Stephen municipality (7678)		Upload Photo
St. Timothy's Hall	31 Marks Street; St. Stephen NB	45°11′43″N 67°16′41″W	St. Stephen municipality (9011)		Upload Photo
Salmon Falls Senior Citizens Centre	450 Milltown Blvd. St. Stephen NB	45°10′24″N 67°17′47″W	St. Stephen municipality (13077)		Upload Photo
Salmon Fish Ladder	St. George Gorge at First Falls; St. George NB	45°07′43″N 66°49′36″W	St. George municipality (8973)		Upload Photo
Seal Cove School	1930 Route 776; Grand Manan NB	44°38′59″N 66°50′45″W	Grand Manan municipality (17401)		Upload Photo
Seal Cove Smoked Herring Stands National Historic Site of Canada	Seal Cove; Grand Manan NB	44°39′N 66°51′W	Federal (2343)	Q23190838	More images
Shaw House	192 Brunswick Street; St. George NB	45°07′44″N 66°49′33″W	St. George municipality (8962)		Upload Photo
J & C Short Shipbuilding Site	12 Denny Street; St. Stephen NB	45°11′24″N 67°15′44″W	St. Stephen municipality (8999)		Upload Photo
Sinclair House	41 Riverside Drive; St. Stephen NB	45°10′16″N 67°17′52″W	St. Stephen municipality (12777)		Upload Photo
Site of Peter Clinch Landing	1 Clinch Street; St. George NB	45°07′41″N 66°49′23″W	St. George municipality (6009)		Upload Photo
Stone House	12 Buchanan Avenue; St. Stephen NB	45°11′37″N 67°17′10″W	St. Stephen municipality (9960)		Upload Photo
Swallowtail Lightkeeper's House	50 Light House Road; Grand Manan NB	44°45′51″N 66°44′01″W	Grand Manan municipality (16105)		Upload Photo
Todd House	75 Pleasant St. St. Stephen NB	45°10′25″N 67°18′05″W	St. Stephen municipality (7655)		Upload Photo
Todd Mansion	45 Union Street; St. Stephen NB	45°11′41″N 67°16′52″W	St. Stephen municipality (8357)		Upload Photo
Town Pump and Water Trough	23 Portage Street; St. George NB	45°07′47″N 66°49′31″W	St. George municipality (6005)		Upload Photo
Vaughan House	72 Union Street; St. Stephen NB	45°11′40″N 67°17′03″W	St. Stephen municipality (8764)		Upload Photo
War Memorial Cenotaph	165 Milltown Blvd. St. Stephen NB	45°11′33″N 67°16′56″W	St. Stephen municipality (8952)		Upload Photo
Whale Cove Cottages	26 Whale Cottage Road; Grand Manan NB	44°46′30″N 66°45′54″W	Grand Manan municipality (16387)		Upload Photo

== See also ==
- List of historic places in New Brunswick
- List of National Historic Sites of Canada in New Brunswick
