= The Anchorage Provincial Park =

Provincial park of New Brunswick, Canada

- IUCN category IV (habitat/species management area)
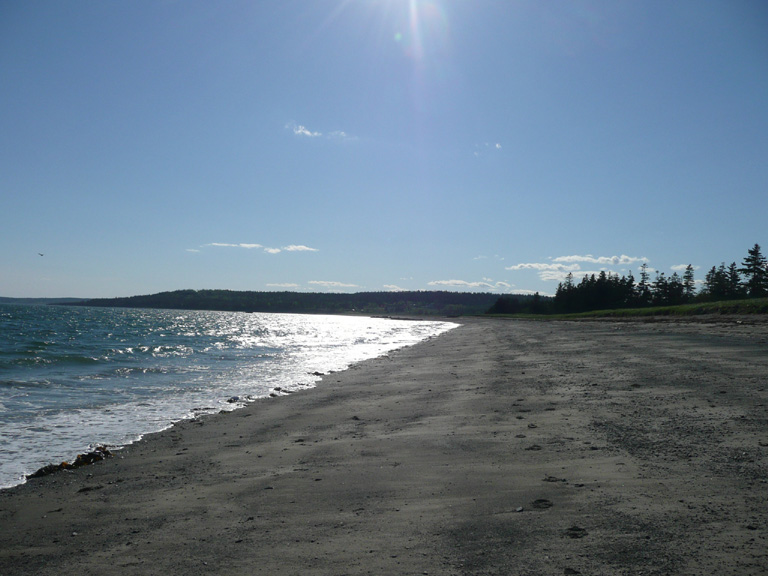
- Beach at The Anchorage Provincial Park
- Interactive map of The Anchorage Provincial Park
- Location: Grand Manan, New Brunswick, Canada
- Nearest city: Saint John, New Brunswick
- Coordinates: 44°39′35″N 66°48′15″W
- Area: 1.39 square kilometres (0.54 sq mi)
- Established: 1970
- Visitors: n/a (in 2009)
- Governing body: Government of New Brunswick

The Anchorage Provincial Park is a provincial park located on the south-east coast of Grand Manan Island, in the Bay of Fundy, New Brunswick, Canada.

Located between the communities of Grand Harbour and Seal Cove, the park is about 24 kilometres (15 mi) south on Route 776 from the Coastal Transport Limited ferry terminal in the community of North Head.

The provincial park and campground were established in the early 1970s after the government purchased the Anchorage hotel property in 1970. Since 2013 the park has been managed by the local Boys & Girls Club. The provincial government announced in April 2013 the park would close, but public opposition resulted in the adoption of a third party management model and the park, which continued to be provincially owned, opened as usual in May 2013.

The March 2026 provincial budget included the Anchorage provincial park in a list of "10 "underutilized" provincially-owned tourism and heritage sites that saw under 5,000 annual visitors" and "would be divested", leading to concerns that the park "might be privatized". The government announced that the park would operate as usual in the summer of 2026 "while transition discussions take place". It was a key employer on the island, until 2013 decreases in the number of employees.

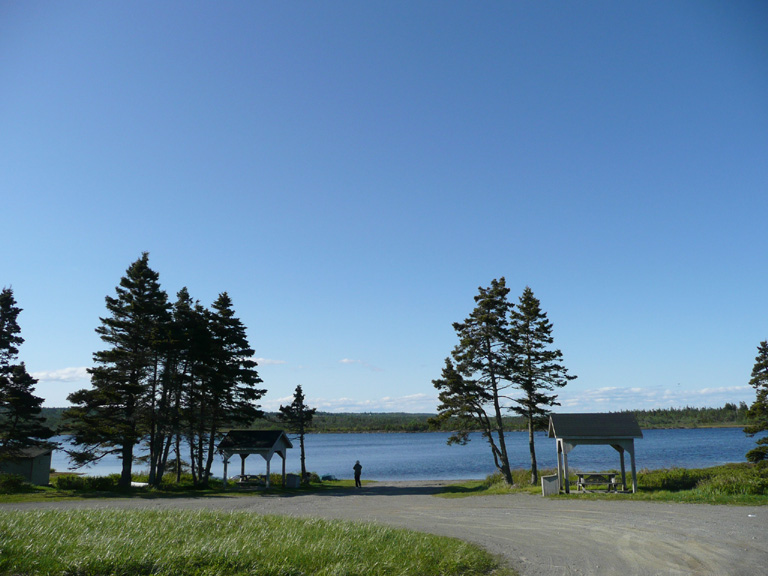
Great Pond

The provincial park lies within the Grand Manan Migratory Bird Sanctuary, which was established in 1931. It contains a number of hiking and cycling trails, and is known for its wild rabbits. The park has a 100-lot campsite, the only provincial campground on the island. The park is adjacent to Long Pond Bay.The Red Point Trail boardwalk is wheelchair accessible. Other trails are Long Pond, Great Pond and Bagley's. Individuals may also partake in sea kayaking, whale-watching and bird-watching at the park. As many as 275 different bird species can be seen on Grand Manan. The park has several blinds for bird viewing.

Other than Anchorage Provincial Park/Grand Manan Bird Sanctuary, areas on Grand Manan recommended for birdwatching include Castalia Marsh and the Thomas Munro Memorial Shoreline. Henderson's Point, a coastal stretch of land within the bird sanctuary adjacent to the Provincial Park, had become "a place where old cars, garbage and burnt mattresses go to rot" before it was purchased by the Nature Conservancy of Canada in 2017 in order to protect the area.

In 2011, a granite monument was erected honouring those lost at sea.
