= Long Eddy Point Lighthouse =

- The lighthouse in 2026
- Location: 438 Whistle Road at the northern end of Grand Manan Island
- Coordinates: 44°47′57.4″N 66°47′06.8″W

Tower
- Constructed: 1874
- Construction: concrete
- Automated: 1989
- Height: 9.3 metres (31 ft)
- Shape: square tower above one corner of a square single-story building
- Markings: white with red trim, red lantern
- Heritage: Heritage Lighthouse Protection Act, 2016
- Fog signal: Horn: blast 4 seconds, silence 56 seconds Horn points 335°

Light
- First lit: 1966
- Focal height: 38.3 metres (126 ft)
- Range: 14 nautical miles (26 km; 16 mi)
- Characteristic: Red flash every 8 seconds

The Long Eddy Point Lighthouse (also known as The Whistle) is a Canadian lighthouse on Grand Manan Island in the Bay of Fundy. The navigation station was first established in 1874 as a fog alarm only and operated as such until 1966, when the present structure was built incorporating a lighthouse. The building has been designated a heritage lighthouse under Canada's Heritage Lighthouse Protection Act.

== History ==
In 1874 a steam-powered fog whistle was built at Long Eddy Point, a tree-covered cliff at the northern end of Grand Manan. It began operation on 1 July 1874. It was built half-way up the cliff overlooking the Bay of Fundy, 80 feet (24 m) above the high water mark. It emitted 3 blasts, four seconds long, every minute. The station's infrastructure included a keeper's house, a coal shed, storage tanks for the water used to generate the steam for the whistle, and a wharf at the bottom of the cliff for delivering supplies to the keeper. Coal was brought from the top of the cliff by a wooden chute 80 feet (24 m) long. In 1893 and 1897 wooden abutments were built to protect the station from falling rocks and other material.

In 1905 a new fog alarm building was constructed on the beach below the original station. It began operation on 15 January 1905 with a diaphone foghorn replacing the steam whistle. In 1948 a new keeper's dwelling was built at the top of the cliff near the present lighthouse. The present building, combining a fog alarm and a lighthouse, was constructed in 1966 at the top of the cliff. The station was automated and de-staffed in 1989.

The Long Eddy Point Lighthouse is also known as "The Whistle", which was the nickname given to the original 1874 steam whistle.

== Heritage designation ==
The Long Eddy Point Lighthouse has been recognized under Canada's Heritage Lighthouse Protection Act. The building will become the property of the Village of Grand Manan and The Swallowtail Keepers Society, which looks after the Swallowtail Lighthouse, will manage the property.

== See also ==
- List of lighthouses in New Brunswick
- List of lighthouses in Canada
