= 2006 Grand Manan riot =

Civil unrest in New Brunswick

- Date: July 22, 2006; Shortly after midnight (Atlantic Daylight Time)
- Location: Grand Manan, New Brunswick, Canada; 44.735°N 66.765°W
- Caused by: Allegations from community members that Ronald Ross was dealing drugs from his house
- Result: Ross's house was burned down and multiple people were charged with crimes stemming from the riot

Number
Approximately 40	Less than 12

Casualties
- Injuries: 4
- Charged: 6

On July 22, 2006, a riot occurred in the village of Grand Manan, New Brunswick, Canada. The incident of civil disorder occurred because of allegations from members of the community that Ronald Ross, who lived in the village, was dealing drugs, including crack cocaine, from his house. This led to tensions between Ross and community members that peaked early in the morning of July 22, when a group of several dozen people engaged in a physical altercation with him and several of his houseguests. The disorder, which saw several gunshots fired and Ross's house being destroyed in an act of arson, resulted in several injuries and multiple arrests.

== Overview ==
In early 2006, Ross was the subject of rumours on the island which alleged that he was selling illegal drugs from his house. Members of the Royal Canadian Mounted Police (RCMP) investigated him but did not find evidence of drug dealing. Despite this, tensions increased and, over Canada Day weekend, a vehicle belonging to his friend Terry Irvine—who was also alleged to be involved in criminal activities—was destroyed by fire. This prompted rumours that Ross and Irvine were planning an act of retribution against the community.

On the night of July 21, about 40 people gathered in the front yard of Carter Foster, who lived across the street from Ross. At the same time, a group of less than a dozen people were at Ross's house. Shortly after midnight, the two sides confronted each other in an altercation that eventually led to a shootout and an attempted arson of Ross's house. Several hours later, Ross's house was burned down, with firefighters hindered in their firefighting efforts by some community members. Police made several arrests following the incident and eventually charged five men, including Foster, with various crimes stemming from the riot; the five were later dubbed by media as the "Grand Manan Five". Four people, including Foster, were found guilty and given sentences that did not include any jail time. Meanwhile, Ross was found guilty of a weapons possession charge and sentenced to time served for a previous stint of house arrest.

The riot received widespread media coverage, especially in Canada. On Grand Manan, the incident led to a greater awareness of the village's drug problem and prompted greater investment into activities for the local youth, including the creation of a recreation centre. Additionally, per the village's mayor, relations between the community and the RCMP, which had soured due to the village's drug problems and the police's response to the riot, improved over the following years.

== Background ==
=== Grand Manan in the early 2000s ===
Grand Manan, located in the Bay of Fundy

Grand Manan is an island in the Bay of Fundy that is part of the Canadian province of New Brunswick, located about 35 kilometres (22 miles) from the province's mainland. In 2006, the island had a population of about 3,000 and its economy was dominated by the aquaculture and fishing industries, with CBC News calling Grand Manan "a quiet fishing community near the Maine border". Its population fluctuates in the summer season with an increase in seasonal residents and tourists. At the time, the island had a detachment of four Royal Canadian Mounted Police (RCMP) officers stationed there, consisting of a corporal and three constables.

By the early 2000s, there was a growing concern among residents and local officials on the island about the presence of illegal drugs, including crack cocaine, ecstasy, and prescription painkillers such as Dilaudid and OxyContin. By 2006, these concerns about drug use, as well as alcohol use, had been exacerbated by the deaths of several young men on the island. In July of that year, Sergeant Greg MacAvoy of the RCMP's regional headquarters in nearby St. George stated that there had been an increase in criminal activity on the island that appeared to be caused by drug activity. This coincided with a downturn in the economy following a boom period in the 1990s, with the aquaculture industry facing issues regarding diseases and a sardine plant on the island having closed down. Additionally, mid-2006 saw an increase in missing property on the island, particularly of power tools. According to James McAvity, a regional crown prosecutor for New Brunswick, Grand Manan had conditions that could contribute to a serious drug problem.

=== Allegations of drug dealing in the Castalia community ===
In 2006, there were rumours on the island that drugs, including crack cocaine, were being sold from a house on the island that belonged to Ronald Ross. Ross was a 41-year-old man who had come to the island from Saint John. He had been living in the house, located in the community of Castalia, for about two years at that point. He was originally from Nova Scotia and had worked for some time on the island in the lobster fishing industry. The house was located next to several other houses at 61 Cedar Street, off of New Brunswick Route 776. Over the previous several months, tensions had increased between Ross and his neighbours, with other residents of the community noting that he often hosted unruly parties and often played loud music throughout the day. Additionally, one neighbour reported an incident where Ross had smashed all of the windows of his girlfriend's car, which was parked in his driveway, with a piece of lumber. Eventually, community concern led to a school-bus stop located near his house to be moved elsewhere to prevent children from having to walk past the building. Of particular concern to the community were rumours that Ross was selling crack cocaine to schoolchildren.

One of the RCMP officers on the island conducted several hours of surveillance on Ross's house from nearby houses and had executed a search warrant on his premises, though the officer did not find evidence that could lead to a criminal charge. Meanwhile, community members began to conduct their own activities in an attempt to monitor Ross's actions. A vigil in front of his house was planned by several local mothers, though it was ultimately called off out of fear of several dogs that Ross had. Additionally, according to journalist Calvin Trillin, someone set up a sign at the intersection of Cedar Street and Route 776 warning motorists "that they were about to drive down a block that held a crack house". Concerning Ross's response to the actions, Trillin quoted an unnamed councillor for Grand Manan's local government, who said, "People on the wrong side of the law usually keep a low profile. ... He made himself out to be this big-time gangster."

=== Vehicle-burning and escalating tensions ===
In addition to allegations of drug dealing, some community members believed that Ross was involved in theft. Particularly, they believed that some of Ross's visitors had been responsible for some of the missing property reported around that time and that Ross was accepting stolen goods as payment for drugs. They accused a regular visitor of Ross's, Terry Irvine, of transporting stolen goods off of the island with his GMC Jimmy and using the vehicle to bring drugs onto the island. Over the 2006 Canada Day weekend, the Jimmy, which was parked in Ross's driveway, was destroyed by fire.

Following the burning, Ross accused a neighbor, Carter Foster, and other community residents of intentionally burning the vehicle. Foster informed Ross that he had been off of the island at the time of the incident, though Ross remained adamant and threatened Foster and his live-in girlfriend, Sarah Wormell. Later that evening, Ross lit a fire in his front yard with several wooden pallets and put propane tanks on top of the flames, with Foster saying that he was threatening to blow up the neighbourhood. An RCMP constable extinguished the fire, during which time Ross told him that at an earlier community meeting some of the other residents had decided to burn down his house. In later testimony, Ross said that he had stopped a man in some woods located behind his house who he feared was going to burn his house down. Additionally, Ross said that, prior to the vehicle-burning, a propane tank had been thrown through one of his house's windows.

In the weeks following Canada Day weekend, rumours began to circulate around the community about possible retribution against the community from Ross and people with him. There were rumours that Ross was planning to have a group of people come to Grand Manan with weapons, including dynamite and machine guns, and burn down several houses, including Foster's. In later testimony to the RCMP, a volunteer firefighter on Grand Manan stated that he had heard that Ross was planning to bring some members of Hells Angels to the island. Eventually, the rumours pinned the exact date of this supposed retribution to July 21, with the group of people involved growing to twenty.

== Course of the event ==
=== Crowd confrontation ===
On the night of Friday, July 21, a group of about 40 people, consisting mostly of local fishermen, began to gather in Foster's front yard. Meanwhile, a group of less than a dozen men were present at Ross's house, located across the street. People in both groups had engaged in drinking that night. Shortly after midnight, RCMP Constable Gerald Bigger came to the house and informed the crowd that the rumours about the group of individuals coming to the island to cause disorder were untrue and that Irvine's new vehicle, a GMC Yukon, had been searched by the RCMP earlier that day after he came onto the island. However, the crowd remained at Foster's property, with Wormell saying that she was afraid that his house would be burned down. Speaking later of the incident, MacAvoy stated that he believed alcohol had been involved. Soon after midnight, several men came out of Ross's house, with some individuals from Foster's crowd moving onto Cedar Street to confront them. Individuals in both groups had weapons, with several people in Foster's group wielding baseball bats—some of the men had participated in a baseball game earlier that day—and at least one person in Ross's group having a knife attached to the end of a pole. Foster yelled at Ross, saying, "You’re going to fucking get off the island!" before the two of them engaged in a physical altercation.

=== Shootout and arson ===
Foster had Ross in a chokehold when multiple gunshots were heard coming from Ross's house, prompting Foster to let go. Foster then went back to his house, retrieved his sniper rifle, and climbed atop his roof. (Note: According to journalist Calvin Trillin, Foster had a licence for the gun, for use in shooting seals that had gotten into fishing weirs.) In later testimony, Foster said that some members of the crowd had told him to shoot at whoever had fired the initial shots, but Foster said he could not bring himself to fire at a person and instead fired at the Yukon and at the light on Ross's front porch. Speaking later to the RCMP, Foster said he shot at the vehicle "to disable it for our own protection, so they wouldn’t take off and get out of there". At the same time that this was occurring, several people in Foster's crowd began to fire flare guns, with Ross getting hit in the leg by a flare. The shootout lasted for about 5 to 10 minutes and had stopped by the time that three RCMP officers had arrived at the scene.

However, following the officers' arrival, fighting continued, with Irvine and Ross suffering injuries. Meanwhile, a group of young men from Foster's side had doused the rear of Ross's house with fuel and set it on fire, prompting the people in the house to flee out the front door. The fire department was notified at about 12:35 a.m., with volunteer firefighters arriving shortly thereafter. They reported hearing cheers from the crowd of "Let it burn!" and "Off the island!". Additionally, some rocks were thrown towards the firefighters, who eventually succeeded in putting out the fire and returned to their fire station. Ross and several other people on his side were eventually escorted by the RCMP away from the site. According to CBC News, RCMP officers made one arrest. Four men suffered injuries from beating, while several other individuals suffered minor injuries.

At about 4:30 or 5 a.m., firefighters responded to reports of explosions going off at Ross's house. When they arrived, they found that a pickup truck had been parked across Cedar Street to prevent their firetruck from reaching the house. This obstacle was eventually cleared, but a group of about six people, including Wormell, proceeded to form a human chain across the road to further prevent the firefighters from reaching the house. While the firefighters eventually reached the house, it was too far gone for the officers to save.

== Aftermath ==
The incident received widespread media coverage, especially in Canada, with the event largely described as an act of vigilantism. (Note: Attributed to multiple sources.) By July 24, additional RCMP officers had been sent to Grand Manan in order to assist with the investigation into the riot. On July 25, the RCMP charged Ross with threatening to burn down a house and with issuing death threats. He was released from custody under the condition that he not return to the island, though he was scheduled to appear in court on August 29 to enter a plea. These charges stemmed from an earlier incident, and by July 26, no criminal charges had been filed with regards to the events of the riot. Speaking that day, MacAvoy told the press that the officers were conducting interviews to try to get a better understanding of the series of events. By that same day, the RCMP had moved a woman who lived with Ross off of the island for her own safety.

=== Response from government officials ===
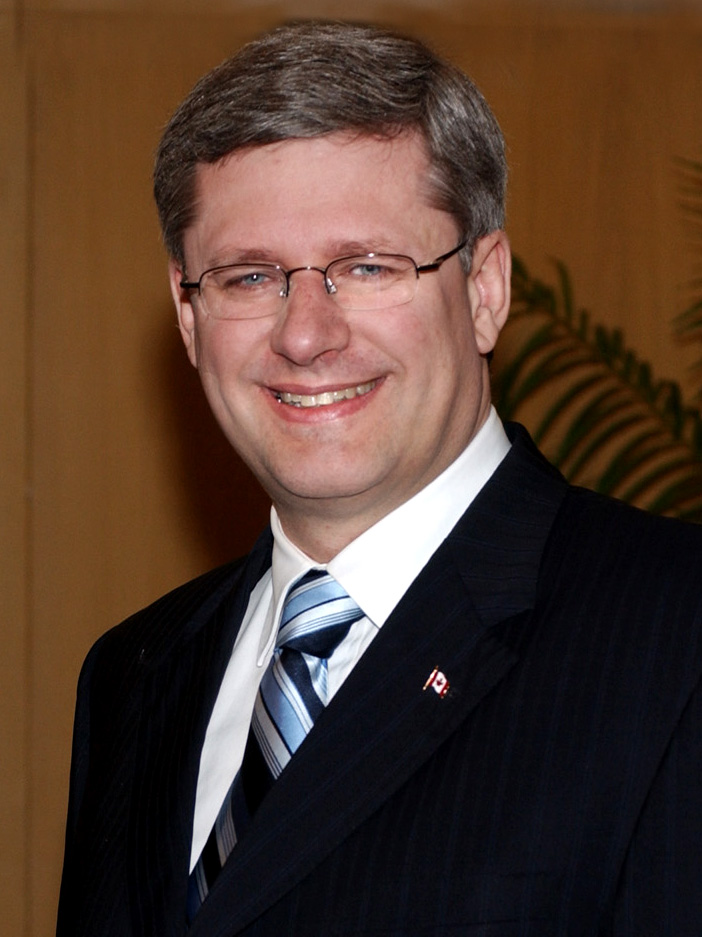
Prime Minister Stephen Harper (pictured 2006) cited the riot while supporting a push for stricter criminal sentencing for serious crimes.

In response to the incident and subsequent investigation, Dennis Greene, the mayor of Grand Manan, supported leniency for the rioters, with CBC News quoting him as saying, "People will be really upset if charges are laid against the people who had any involvement with the burning of the house and of the disturbance that was there." Eric Allaby, a member of the Legislative Assembly of New Brunswick from Fundy Isles who was a part of the parliamentary opposition, called for a government inquiry into the incident and said that investigations into combating drug addiction were needed to prevent similar incidents from happening. Meanwhile, Bernard Lord, the premier of New Brunswick, said that he had ordered ministers to investigate the situation. On July 27, during a visit to the Hopewell Rocks, Canadian Prime Minister Stephen Harper spoke of the riot, telling the Telegraph-Journal, "This is probably an extreme example of the desire of the population to see change and see crime fought in this country." He further said that his government felt that "the laws are too lax" and that they would be looking into ending conditional sentencing and enacting mandatory sentencing for serious crimes.

=== Increased RCMP presence and community protest ===
On July 30, three people, including Foster, were arrested in connection with the July 22 riot. The following day, Foster was charged in the nearby municipality of St. Stephen with possession of a dangerous firearm and unsafe firearms storage. The other two individuals, one man and one woman, were released on the promise of appearing in court that October. Meanwhile, Foster was scheduled to have a hearing regarding his bail on August 1.

Following the arrests, several island residents planned to hold a demonstration on August 1 outside of the house of an alleged drug dealer in the community of Seal Cove. However, on that day, in response to rumours of another riot, a detachment of over 70 RCMP officers were sent to Grand Manan. This police force included emergency responders, members of the province's SWAT unit, and a police dog. The demonstration did not materialize and instead consisted of several gatherings of several dozen individuals at two convenience stores, with several participants saying that the large police presence had deterred many would-be protestors. In a report published on August 2, a spokesperson for the RCMP stated that the additional police officers would be stationed on the island for an indefinite period of time. Per CBC News, Mayor Greene said that the RCMP presence on the island had local residents concerned and that some residents were upset with the manner in which the police arrested two of the individuals.

On August 2, the RCMP held a town hall meeting at a local school in order to discuss the state of affairs with local residents. Over 400 members of the community attended. During the event, many of the residents expressed frustration over the police's handling of the island's drug problems and the riot investigation. Furthermore, many of the attendees cheered when Mayor Greene publicly voiced support for the arrested individuals. According to Trillin, the event "turned into a dressing down of the police for lax drug enforcement and a pep rally" in support of the arrested. During the meeting, RCMP officers showed a pre-recorded video of two of the arrested, including Foster, who urged the audience to remain calm and cooperate with the police. Following the video, which depicted the men in handcuffs, there were chants of "free our boys" from some audience members. By August 10, most of the RCMP officers had departed from the island.

=== Subsequent arrests and criminal charges ===
Reporting on August 10, The Quoddy Tides of nearby Eastport, Maine, stated that nine people had been arrested in connection with the riot by that time. Of these, four residents of Grand Manan had been charged and were being held by police on the mainland. This included Foster, Gregory Guthrie, and Michael Dean Small, who were all charged with one count of unlawful weapons possession, and Matthew Lambert, who was charged with two counts of unlawful weapons possession. In addition, Small faced a charge of arson and Foster faced a charge of unlawful storage of fire firearms. These four men were given a bail hearing date of August 15. In addition to these four, a man and a woman had been arrested, but released with the promise of reappearing in court, while three other individuals were arrested and interrogated, but ultimately released.

In order to help the arrested, an island resident who was a friend of the four men established a legal defence fund called the Concerned Citizens Legal Defence and initiated an awareness ribbon campaign to show solidarity. Additionally, a sign was erected near the maritime passenger terminal for the island's ferry that read "FREE OUR HEROES". By August 10, the fund had raised about $3,000 ($4,500 in 2025) in donations. By November, this had increased to about $30,000 ($45,000 in 2025). Prior to their trial, David Lutz, a New Brunswick-based lawyer, went to the island to discuss representing the accused and told some individuals that he would need $20,000 ($30,000 in 2025) as a retainer. According to Lutz, the following evening, while he was waiting for a ferry, a man he had never met before approached him with an envelope full of cash and cheques totalling about $20,000.

By late August, at least six individuals, including Ross, had been charged with crimes related to the riot. In Ross's case, this included a weapons possession charge, with Ross turning himself in after an arrest warrant for him had been issued. On August 18, five men were released from police custody, with Ross being released on bail on August 21. Ross was placed under house arrest at his father's home in Digby, Nova Scotia, with limited travel exceptions. Additionally, he was instructed to refrain from alcohol or drug consumption, barred from firearms possession, and prohibited from contacting or traveling to Grand Manan. His next scheduled court appearance was set for August 29, with a publication ban in effect for the hearing.

=== Court case ===
==== Testimony ====
On November 2, testimony commenced in a 12-person jury trial against Foster, Guthrey, Lambert, Small, and a fifth man—Lloyd Bainbridge—for charges stemming from the riot, which were as follows:

Accused	Charges		
Accused	Arson	Possession of a weapon dangerous to public peace	Unsafe storage of a firearm
Lloyd Bainbridge	Yes	No	No
Carter Foster	No	Yes	Yes; Five firearms
Gregory Guthrie	No	Yes	No
Matthew Lambert	No	Yes; Two counts	No
Michael Small	Yes	Yes	No

Bainbridge's and Small's charge of arson was with regards to the fire that was set earlier in the night and not for the fire that ultimately destroyed the building. The RCMP could not identify the individual or individuals who had been responsible for this act in their investigation, and as a result, no one was charged. Additionally, crown prosecutors had opted against pressing charges against any of the individuals who had hindered the fire department's response or who had, per Trillin, "egged on the crowd".

The trial was held in Saint Andrews, with Judge Hugh McLellan presiding. McAvity and Randy DiPaolo served as crown prosecutors, while Lutz and Carley Parish served as the criminal defence lawyers for the five men, who had become known by the nicknames of the "Grand Manan Five" or simply "The Boys". In their defense, Lutz argued that the men had acted in self-defence on the night of the riot, saying that Ross was a drug dealer and had threatened his clients' lives.

The first crown witnesses called for testimony were three RCMP officers, while later testimonies were given by local residents and firefighters. On November 7, Ross testified, saying that, while he had been convicted of several dozen crimes in both New Brunswick and Nova Scotia dating back to 1989, he had never been charged with drug trafficking and that he was not a drug dealer. However, Ross stated that he occasionally used crack cocaine and had used crack cocaine on the night of the riot, testifying that he believed that some people on Grand Manan mistaken his using drugs for selling drugs. Ross further stated that Small had previously used crack cocaine at his house approximately 14 months prior to the riot. Additionally, Ross said that the first gunshots during the riot had come from Foster's house.

On November 8, several of Ross's friends, including several individuals who had been at his house on the night of the riot, testified. Several of the individuals testified that Irvine had been the first person to fire a gun during the confrontation and that Ross was well-known on the island as a source of crack cocaine, though they stated that he was not a drug dealer. Further, they said that Irvine often brought the drug to the island. Irvine also testified, saying that, while he was at Ross's house on the night of the riot, he was too intoxicated to remember much of the events.

In total, testimony lasted about two weeks.

==== Verdict and sentencing ====
On November 18, after one and a half days of deliberation, the jury rendered its verdict. Bainbridge and Small were found guilty of arson, while Foster and Lambert were found guilty of unlawful storage of a firearm and possession of a flare gun for purpose dangerous to the public, respectively. Meanwhile, Guthrie was acquitted. Following the reading of the verdict, Bainbridge and Small were imprisoned while the remaining three were allowed to return to Grand Manan, awaiting their sentencing hearing on December 4.

On December 4, Judge McLellan delivered his sentencing. Bainbridge and Small were sentenced to one year of house arrest and ordered to pay restitution of $5,000 ($7,500 in 2025) each to Ross, while Foster was sentenced to six months of probation and Lambert to six months of house arrest. Additionally, if Foster was able to keep the peace during his probation, he would not have a criminal record. McAvity did not oppose the judge's decision to avoid jail time for the convicted.

==== Later legal events ====
Ross's trial concerning his charges of making death threats and possessing a weapon dangerous to the public peace was expected to commence the following year. This trial took place in April 2007, with Judge William Grant presiding and Joel Hansen serving as Ross's defense lawyer. As part of the trial, Foster testified against Ross. Ross was ultimately found guilty of making a death threat and, given his house arrest, was sentenced to time served. Additionally, his probation temporarily barred him from returning to Grand Manan. Also in early 2007, Irvine pleaded guilty to unrelated charges regarding the theft of several thousand dollars of goods from three Real Atlantic Superstore locations, resulting in jail time.

== Legacy ==
=== Comparisons to other events ===
The event has drawn comparisons to other instances of civil unrest in New Brunswick's history. In an article published by the Faculty of Arts of the University of New Brunswick's Saint John campus, the incident was discussed alongside other provincial historical incidents. In particular, the incident was compared to a 1977 incident of civil unrest in Petit-Rocher wherein the local RCMP presence was highly criticized for both their lack of attention to a societal problem and their inability to handle the ensuing civil disorder. In a 2007 article for The New Yorker regarding the riot, Trillin noted that Grand Manan's history included earlier instances of vigilantism directed towards individuals or groups. He cited Marc Shell, a professor at Harvard University who researched Grand Manan history, who said concerning the island, "unpopular groups are often driven off island by fire" and that "sometimes the only form of law enforcement is illegal police-enforced banishment". In 2009, CBC News reported on another incident of a violent altercation between several people on Grand Manan, drawing comparisons between it and the 2007 incident in the process.

=== Changes on Grand Manan ===
In November 2006, CBC News reported that some Grand Manan residents blamed the island's drug problems in part on the lack of activities for younger residents, prompting community discussions on establishing more youth recreational programs. CBC News cited a local hotel owner who was pushing to have a new recreation centre and skating rink built on the island. According to an article published by the Saint John campus of the University of New Brunswick's Faculty of Arts, the riot led to greater public investment in the Grand Manan community by the provincial and federal governments, with included the construction of a youth centre and an outdoor skating rink. Discussing this with The New Yorker in 2007, Foster said that the investment was a positive result of the incident, saying, "There's going to be some recreation for the young kids. The only recreation I had growing up was to go get drunk."

"There's more awareness of drugs, parents are starting to talk to their kids and they're having meetings at the school. ... People are talking about it. We've had people come up to us and say it was an eye-opener for them and they haven't touched drugs since."

— Sarah Wormell, quoted by CBC News discussing the impact of the riot, April 3, 2007

Speaking in April 2007, Wormell was cited by CBC News as saying that the riot had led to some positive changes on Grand Manan, including greater awareness of drug use in the community. Additionally, several citizens organized neighbourhood watch groups. Some residents opined that, following the riot, drug use had become less prevalent in the community, but Mayor Greene stated that the island still had a drug problem, though a less visible one.

Speaking in November 2006, Mayor Greene said that the RCMP was working to regain public trust on the island. Following the incident, he had called for an investigation into the RCMP following their officer deployment to the island, claiming that they had spent about $100,000 ($151,000 in 2025) on the investigation after years of saying that they lacked several thousand dollars for a drug dog on the ferry. However, by February 2009, Greene, who was still Grand Manan's mayor, stated that the relationship between the community and the RCMP had improved significantly, citing a change in officers on the island.

== See also ==
- List of incidents of civil unrest in Canada
