= Gannet Rock Lighthouse =

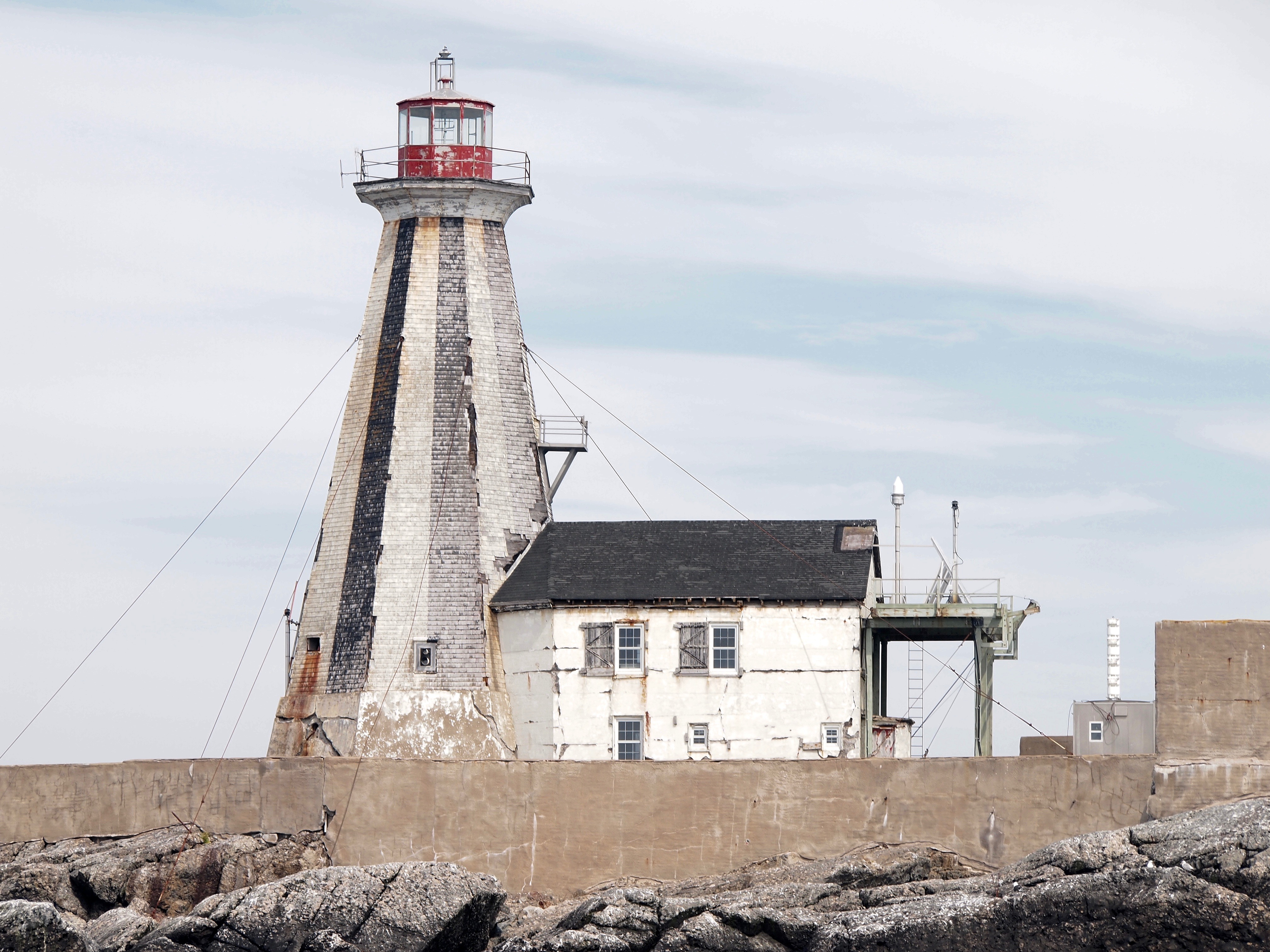
- Gannet Rock lighthouse and attached lightkeeper's residence in 2016
- Location: 8 miles (13 km) south of Grand Manan; New Brunswick
- Coordinates: 44°30′37.1″N 66°46′52.9″W

Tower
- Constructed: 1831
- Foundation: stone and concrete base
- Construction: timber sheathed with wood shingles tower
- Automated: 1996
- Height: 22.9 metres (75 ft)
- Shape: octagonal tower
- Markings: black and white vertical stripes tower, red lantern
- Power source: solar power
- Operator: Canadian Coast Guard
- Heritage: Recognized Heritage Federal Building: Light tower (1991); Lightkeeper's residence (2000)
- Fog signal: Horn: blast 2 seconds; silence 3s. blast 2 s; silence 3s. blast 2s. silence 48s.
- Racon: G (– –)

Light
- First lit: 1831
- Focal height: 28.2 metres (93 ft)
- Lens: second order Fresnel lens
- Range: 19 nautical miles (35 km; 22 mi)
- Characteristic: Fl W 5s.

The Gannet Rock Lighthouse is a Canadian lighthouse located on a rocky islet, named Menaskook by the Passamaquoddy, 8 miles (13 km) south of Grand Manan in the Bay of Fundy. It was first lit in 1831 and was staffed until 1996. It was solarized in 2002 and remains operational in 2023. It was declared "surplus to requirements" by the Canadian Coast Guard in 2010 and is no longer being maintained.

== Gannet Rock in the 19th century ==
In 1824 the Legislative Assembly of New Brunswick passed a bill requiring that a lighthouse be built south of Grand Manan. Dangerous shoals in the area were a hazard to ships entering the Bay of Fundy en route to the port of Saint John, New Brunswick. The Commissioners of Lighthouses built wooden test structures on Yellow Murr Ledge and Gannet Rock, and when the former was washed away it was determined that Gannet Rock would be the best location for the lighthouse, for which £1000 had been allocated. The rock islet 8 miles (13 km) south of Grand Manan is 40 feet (12 m) high and approximately 300 feet (91 m) long at high tide. The lighthouse was built in 1831 and the light was first lit in December of that year.

The six-story tapered octagonal lighthouse tower was built of hand-hewn timber. The exterior was shingled and painted with vertical black and white stripes. The original tower was 41.5 feet (12.6 m) tall. The light was originally flashing red but the lantern glass was changed in 1843 to make the light white and thus more visible. The signal consisted of 11 seconds of white light alternating with 9 seconds of darkness. A mixture of whale oil and turpentine, along with other flammable substances, was burned in the lamp.

As well as the lighthouse tower, a dwelling for the lighthouse keeper was constructed in 1831. The cost of building both structures was £630. The house was rebuilt in 1884 and again in 1887.

In 1845 a 12 feet (3.7 m) tall granite retaining wall was built to safeguard the structure. Other improvements, both made in 1840, were the provision of a signal gun and the digging of a chute in the rock to allow the lighthouse keeper to lower and raise his boat.

Following the 1899 wreck of the Castillian on Gannett Rock, lighthouse keeper William McLaughlin "[Nearly] every wreck of the last sixty years on the Murr Ledges and south Grand Manan have been on the spring tides and the captains always thought they were on Brier Island." The earlier October 13 1833 wreck of the Jane after mistaking the new Gannet Rock lighthouse for Brier Island had resulted in the April 1834 retrofit of Gannet Rock to be a flashing light.

== Infrastructure changes in the 20th century ==
In 1905 a further 12 feet (3.7 m) tall concrete wall was added to tower's base and its height was increased to seven storeys. A new lantern was built to house a second-order Fresnel lens. Pressurized petroleum vapour was burned in the lamp, producing a light with an intensity of 85,000 candlepower, reputedly second only to that of the Eddystone Lighthouse. In 1907 the light station acquired a diaphone foghorn, which was housed in a newly constructed fog alarm building.

In 1906 a new keeper's residence was built of brick, and in 1931 this was in turn replaced by a 2 1/2-storey reinforced concrete dwelling attached to the lighthouse tower. It was designed to house two lighthouse keepers and their families.

In 1911, telephone cable was laid from Grand Manan to Wood Island, to Outer Wood Island, to Gannet Rock.

In 1967 the lantern and lens were removed from the tower, which was suspected of being inadequate to support their weight. They were replaced by an aluminum lantern containing a rotating airport beacon. The reassembled Fresnel lens is now housed in the Grand Manan Museum in Grand Harbour. There it is the centrepiece of the Walter B. McLaughlin Marine Gallery, whose name honours Gannet Rock's longest serving (1853–1880) head lighthouse keeper. A cable attached to a Canadian Coast Guard vessel was used to detach the massive iron lantern from the top of the tower.

== Gannet Rock lighthouse keepers ==
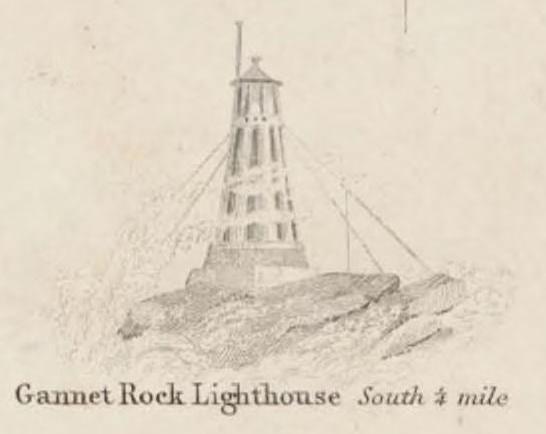
An 1855 illustration of the Gannet Rock Lighthouse

Gannet Rock was staffed from 1831 until 1996, when the last keepers were removed from the then fully automated light station. During the 19th and early 20th centuries resident keepers were accompanied by their families, but by the 1950s teams of keepers worked monthlong shifts on Gannet Rock, alternating with off-duty periods ashore.

== Gannet Rock in the 21st century ==
In 2002 the light and foghorn, which had been powered by diesel-generated electricity, were solarized. At that time the Coast Guard planned to "completely restore and maintain the exterior of this historic structure that continues to be an essential aid to navigation in the Bay of Fundy". In early 2003 the Canadian Coast Guard gutted the keeper's house, which had developed interior mold. However, the site continued to deteriorate and by late 2010 the Coast Guard deemed Gannet Rock "no longer safe for maintenance crews to visit". The light and foghorn remain operational and are listed in the "List of lights, buoys, and fog signals" in the Canadian Coast Guard's Notices to Mariners (NOTMAR).

In 2010 the Canadian Parliament passed the Heritage Lighthouse Protection Act (Bill S-215), which allows citizens to petition the government to designate and preserve historically significant lighthouses. The Department of Fisheries and Oceans, which is responsible for the Canadian Coast Guard, then declared all of its 976 active and inactive lighthouses, including Gannet Rock, "surplus to requirements". Surplus lighthouses will not be protected under the act unless a community group agrees to take financial responsibility for restoration and maintenance. This is likely to be beyond the means of the small community of Grand Manan, which has already purchased the Swallowtail Lighthouse on the island and is in the process of restoring it at a cost of "hundreds of thousands of dollars".

In 2014 the Gannet Rock lighthouse, along with other federally owned lighthouses, was named to Heritage Canada The National Trust's list of "Top ten endangered places" in Canada.

== Heritage designation ==
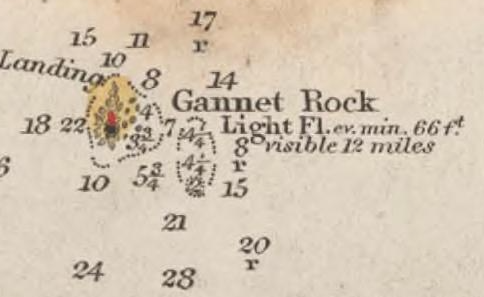
The Gannet Rock light station on an 1855 chart

Parks Canada has designated both the lighthouse tower and the lightkeeper's residence Recognized Heritage Federal Buildings. The tower was recognized in 1991 as being "one of the best examples of a structure associated with the provision of navigational aids for international and commercial traffic", "the most isolated light station on the Fundy coast", and "the second-oldest wooden tower within Canada". The residence was recognized in 2000 for "its historical associations, and its architectural and environmental value".

== See also ==
- List of lighthouses in New Brunswick
- List of lighthouses in Canada
