= Lord Ashburton (ship) =

Canadian merchant barque

Coordinates: 44°48′45″N 66°46′15″W

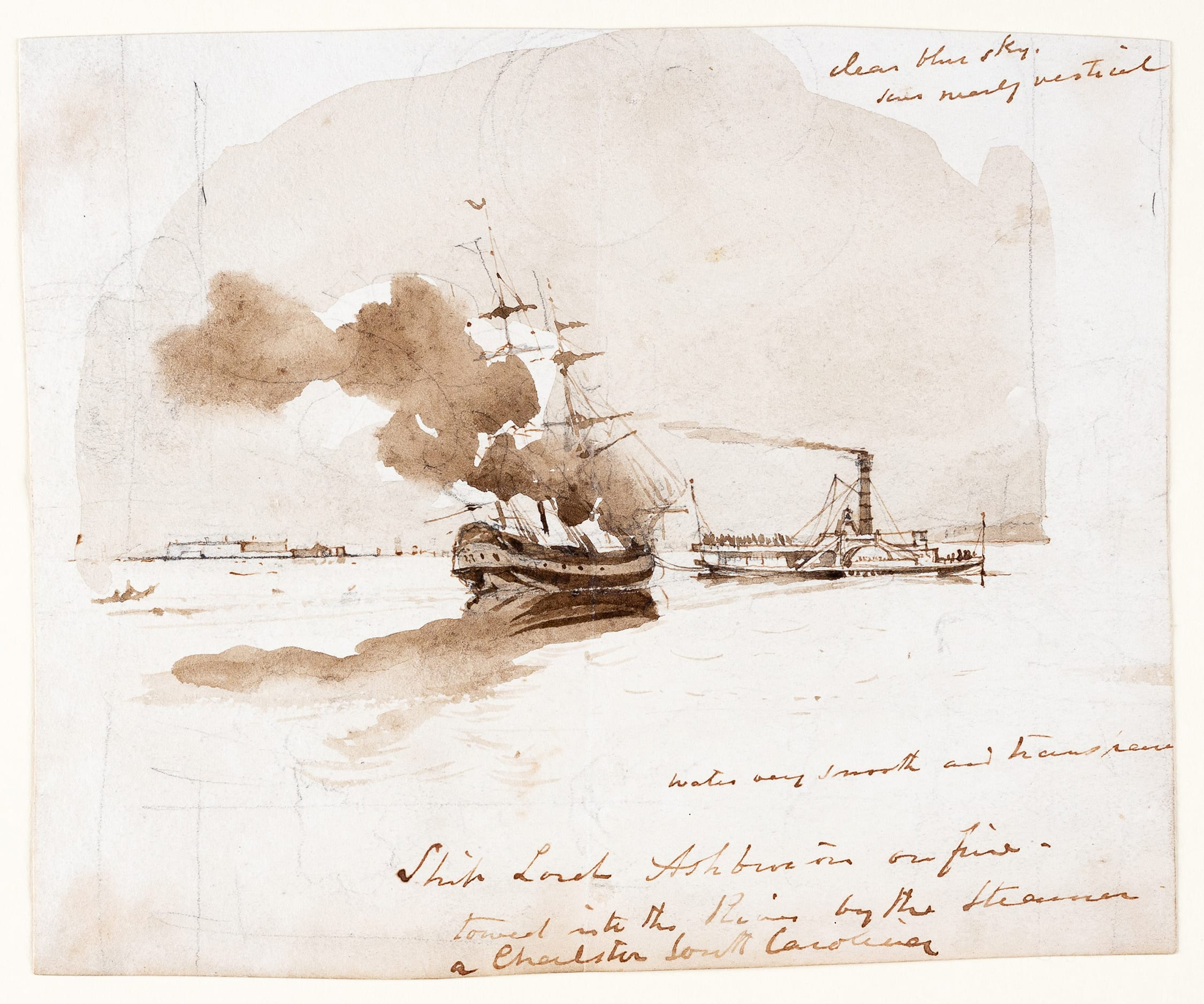
- The Lord Ashburton on fire at Charleston in 1845, sketched by Ebenezer Landells

History

Great Britain
- Name: Lord Ashburton
- Builder: Joshua Briggs
- Launched: St. Andrews, New Brunswick
- Completed: 1843
- Fate: Wrecked on 19 January 1857 at Grand Manan Island en route from Toulon to Saint John, New Brunswick

General characteristics
- Tons burthen: 1009
- Length: 155 ft (47 m)
- Beam: 30 ft (9.1 m)
- Propulsion: Sails
- Sail plan: Three-masted barque

Lord Ashburton was a merchant ship built in 1843 at Saint Andrews, New Brunswick. She was wrecked in a nor'easter on Grand Manan Island in January 1857 en route from Toulon to Saint John, New Brunswick.

== Construction ==
The barque Lord Ashburton was built at Brandy Cove, St. Andrews by Joshua Briggs in 1843. The ship's name honoured Alexander Baring, 1st Baron Ashburton, one of the signatories of the Webster-Ashburton Treaty. The treaty, signed in 1842, had resolved several border issues between the United States and the British North American colonies, including New Brunswick. The captain and original owner was Nehemiah Marks. The ship was registered at St. Andrews in 1843 but was later sold and registration transferred to Liverpool.

== Fire at Charleston, South Carolina ==
The Charleston Patriot reported that the Lord Ashburton had caught fire at Charleston on 20 February 1845. The ship had been preparing to leave the harbour with a cargo of 2600 bales of cotton. She was towed from the wharf to the opposite side of the river near Hog Island channel, where the fire was eventually extinguished.

== Last voyage and shipwreck ==
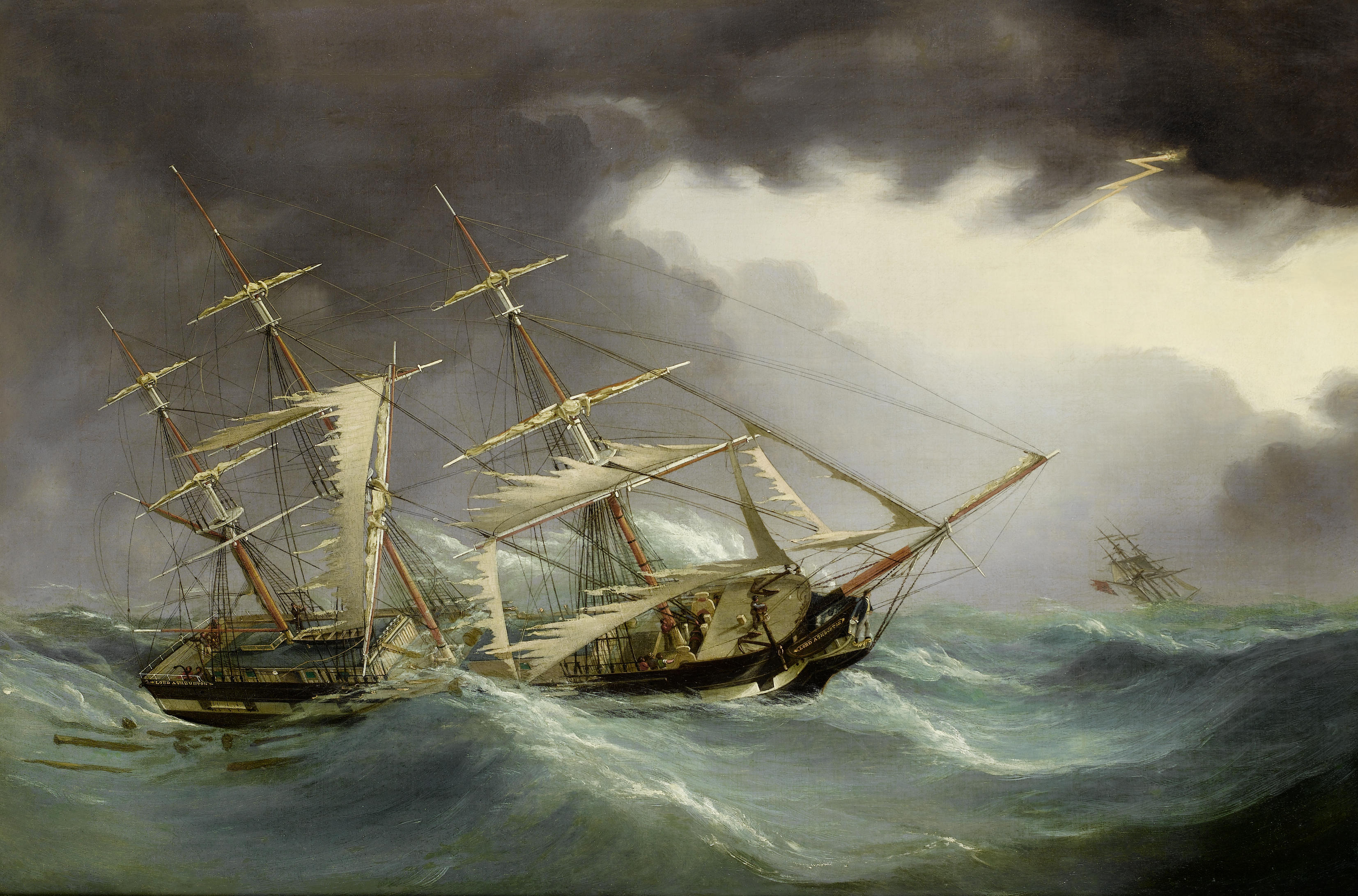
"The full-rigged Lord Ashburton foundering in a hurricane off Grand Manan Island, New Brunswick, 19th January 1857" by Joseph Heard

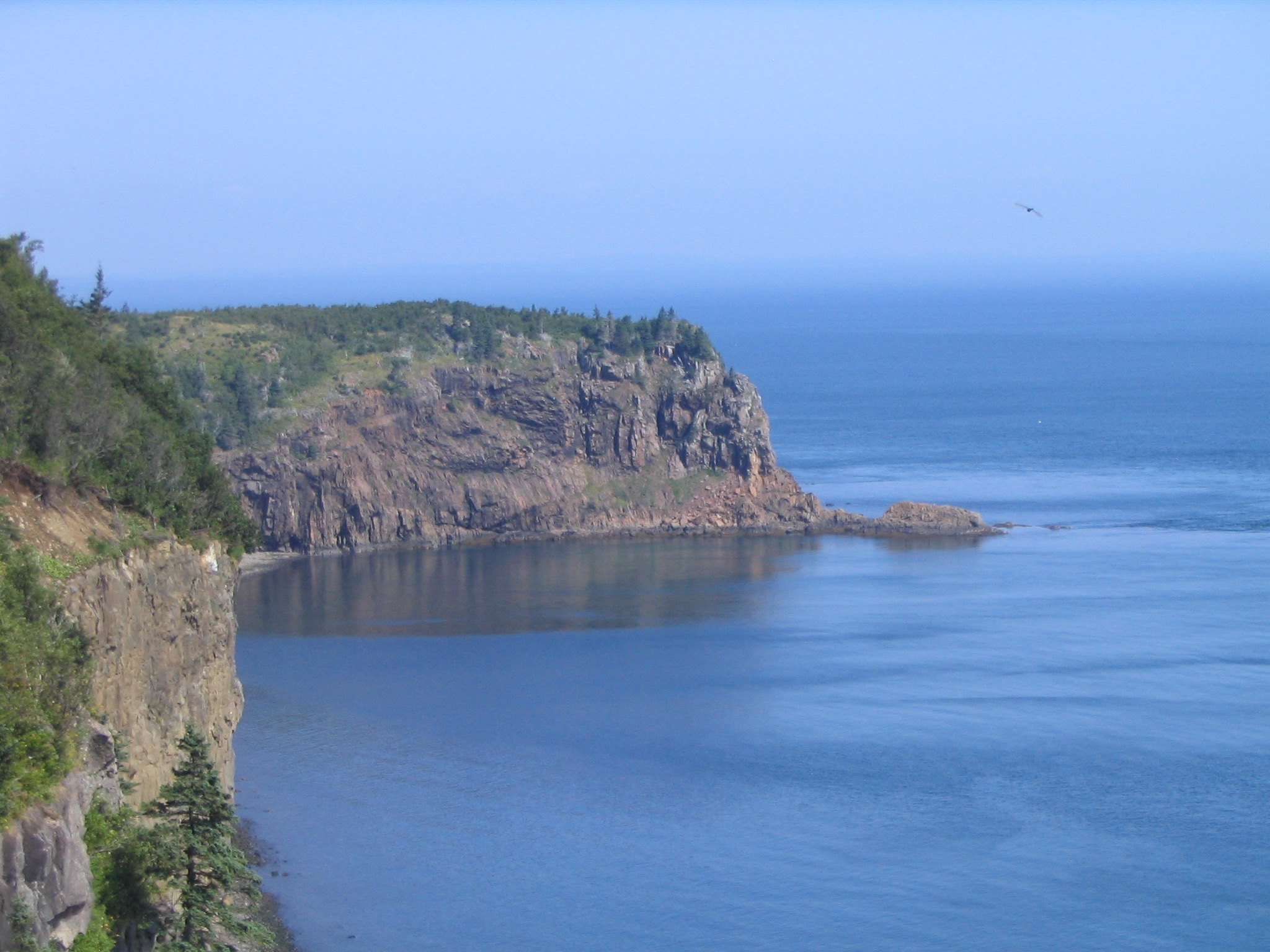
Ashburton Head, Grand Manan

The Lord Ashburton left Toulon on 17 November 1856 in ballast, heading for the port of Saint John, New Brunswick. The ship carried a crew of 28 in addition to the captain, Ewen Clarke Crerar of Pictou, Nova Scotia. She reached Cape Sable Island at the southern tip of Nova Scotia on 25 December and entered the Bay of Fundy, but bad weather impeded her progress toward Saint John.

On 17 January the crew sighted the lighthouse on Partridge Island at the mouth of Saint John harbour. However the ship was driven back down the Bay of Fundy by a violent nor'easter and in the early morning of 19 January she struck a rocky headland at the north end of Grand Manan Island. All three masts were carried away and the Lord Ashburton broke up on the rocks. The captain and most of the crew were drowned but ten men reached the shore alive. Two of them froze to death on the beach, but the others survived and were rescued by villagers the following day. Five of the sailors had huddled together on a ledge part way up the cliff, while the remaining three managed to reach the top of the cliff, where they took refuge in an old barn.

== Legacy ==
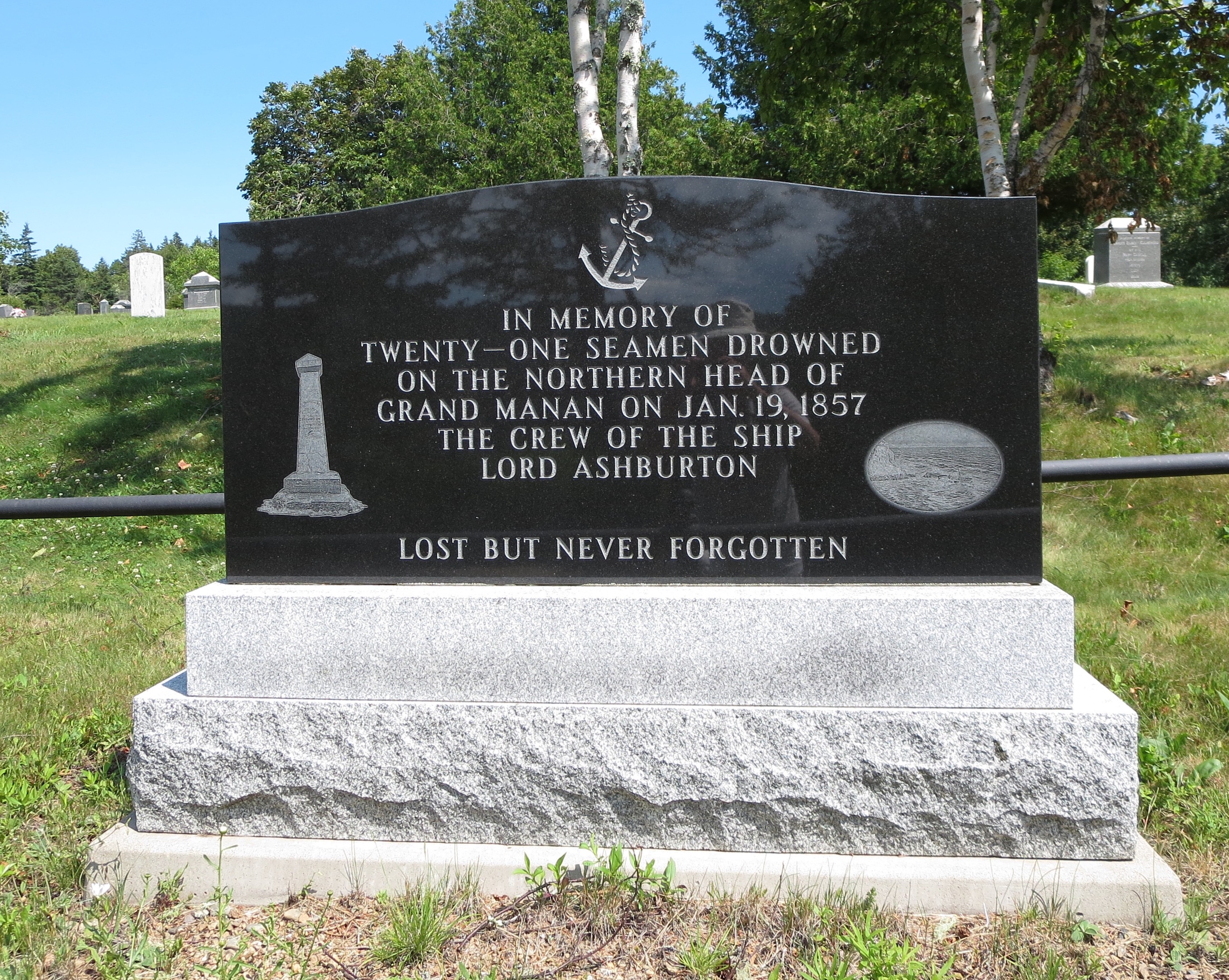
Monument erected in 2011

The victims' bodies were recovered and buried in the cemetery at North Head, near the scene of the shipwreck. The grave site was marked by a wooden plaque until a stone monument was erected in 1910, bearing the inscription "In memory of 21 seamen drowned on the northern head of Grand Manan Jan. 19th 1857 belonging to the ship Lord Ashburton." In 2011 a new monument replaced the 1910 stone.

The survivors of the wreck were cared for by villagers and later taken to hospital in Saint John. One of the men who had managed to climb the cliff was a Danish seaman named James Lawson. Because of his injuries and exposure to the cold, all of his toes had to be amputated. He became a shoemaker and returned to Grand Manan, where he spent the rest of his life living and working in the village of North Head. He died in 1918 at the age of 84.

The headland where the shipwreck happened had been locally called Eel Brook Point. After the wreck it came to be known as Ashburton Head, which was later established as its official name by the Geographical Names Board of Canada.
