= Grand Manan =

- Village
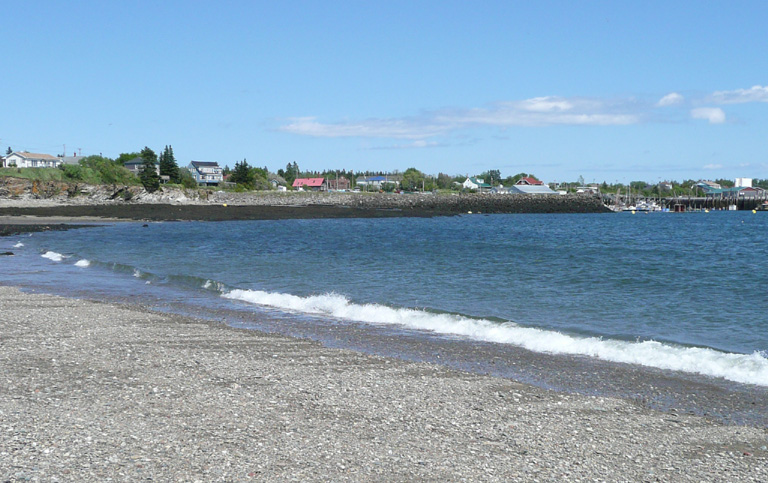
- Beach along Grand Manan's North Head

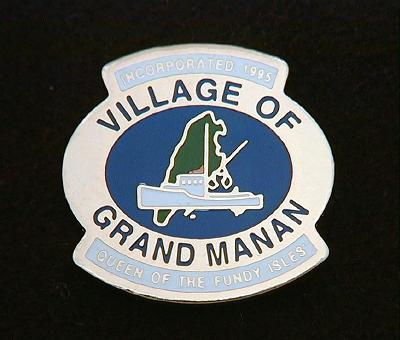
- Seal
- Nickname: "Queen of the Fundy Isles"
- Location within New Brunswick
- Coordinates: 44.69°N 66.82°W
- Country: Canada
- Province: New Brunswick
- County: Charlotte
- Settled: 1784
- Incorporated: 1854

Government
  - Type: Village
  - Mayor: Bonnie H. Morse
  - Councillors: Susan Ballantyne, William (Bill) Anderson, Philman L. Green, Cara V. Greenlaw, Brady C. Ross, Vernon Ross, Wayne H. Sturgeon, Trish Toll, Gary Urquhart

Area
  - Land: 150.56 km^{2} (58.13 sq mi)
- Elevation: 78 m (256 ft)

Population (2021)
  - Total: 2,595
  - Density: 17.2/km^{2} (45/sq mi)
  - Change (2016–21): ▲10.0%
- Time zone: UTC-4 (Atlantic)
  - Summer (DST): UTC-3 (Atlantic)
- Postal code: E5G0A1
- Area code: 506
- LORAN: 4443.00N
- LORAN: 06648.00W
- WMO Id: 71030
- LFA (Lobster Fishing Area): Area 38
- Demonym: "Grand Mananer"
- Website: Official website

Grand Manan is an island in the Bay of Fundy, within Charlotte County, New Brunswick, Canada. It is 15km from the American town of Lubec, Maine and 32km from the Canadian town of Blacks Harbour, New Brunswick.

Grand Manan is also the name for the village that incorporates the main island and several nearby smaller islands. White Head Island and Machias Seal Island are within Grand Manan Parish but are not part of the village. (Note: Originally defined as "all of Grand Manan Parish except the local service district of White Head Island", the 2023 New Brunswick local governance reforms finally clarified the status of Machias Seal Island and small islands immediately off White Head Island.)

== History ==
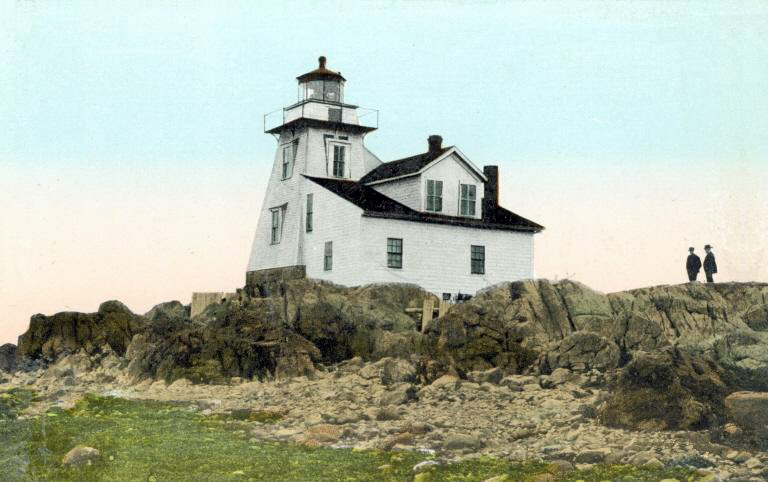
Grand Harbour Lighthouse circa 1910

Although it was "likely" spotted by Sebastian Cabot in 1498 and Gaspar Cortereal in 1501, it was Portuguese explorer João Álvares Fagundes who charted the area around 1520. Its first recorded visitor was Diogo Homem, whose 1558 map was the first to show the island.

French merchant-explorer Étienne Bellenger visited the area in January 1583. In 1606 Samuel de Champlain sheltered on nearby White Head Island and produced a map calling the island "Manthane", which later changed to "Menane" or "Menasne". The word "Manan" believed to be a corruption of Passamaquoddy mun-an-ook meaning "the island". It was also previously known as Great St. Mary's Island.

In 1693, the island was granted to Paul D'Ailleboust, Sieur de Périgny as part of New France. D'Ailleboust did not take possession of it, and it reverted to the French Crown, in whose possession it remained until 1713, when it was traded to the British in the Treaty of Utrecht.

In Spring 1763, Messrs. Vose and Miller became the first to try and settle on Grand Manan after fleeing Yarmouth Harbour with their families to avoid arrest after being accused of plundering a shipwreck, but departed after only a year.

A 1773 minute of the Nova Scotia Council "reserved" the island of Grand Manan to Lord William Campbell, who had visited it in 1767 but made no efforts to settle it. Joel Bonny and James, Abiel and Moses Sprague moved from Machias to Grand Manan in 1773, but left after a year when resident natives ordered them off. Joel Bonny returned in 1779 and paid the natives $10 and a cow to winter on the island where his wife gave birth to a son, before they departed the following year.

In 1784, Moses Gerrish gathered a group of settlers on an area of Grand Manan he called Ross Island, in honour of settler Thomas Ross, and formed the first permanent settlement. During the American Revolution, just off the island there were many naval battles between American privateers and British shipping.

Because of the Treaty of Paris (1783), the U.S. considered Grand Manan to be its possession due to the island's proximity to Maine. The Jay Treaty of 1794 did not solve the ownership claims of Grand Manan and the Passamaquoddy Bay islands. Following the Treaty of Ghent, a commission was set up between Britain and the U.S. to settle in 1817 the sovereignty of every islands in the area: Britain obtained title of Grand Manan, while surrendering its sovereignty claims over Eastport on Moose, Frederick and Dudley islands in nearby Cobscook Bay.

In 1810, legislature passed an "Act to Prevent the Destruction of Moose on Grand Manan".

From 1812 to 1814, the Bay of Fundy was infested with privateers who raided and plundered villages. In 1814, the schooner George was purchased at prize-auction and intentionally loaded with specifically-British goods at Saint John, so John Tappen could have captains William Sebor and Henry Dekoven fraudulently portray their privateer ship Fly's "capture" of George and seizure of those insured goods when it was docked at Long Island Harbour, Grand Manan. In 1831 the island's first lighthouse, Gannet Rock Lighthouse, was built on a rocky islet south of Grand Manan, to guide shipping en route to Saint John.

This period was also marked by a number of shipwrecks off the island's rocky, cliff-lined coast. In 1857, the ship Lord Ashburton, was driven into the cliffs at the northern end of the island by hurricane-force winds to great loss of life. Another wreck was the Nova Scotian barque Walton, which was bound for Saint John, from Wales when it wrecked on the White Ledge off Grand Manan on September 14, 1878.

By 1851, the island population numbered almost 1,200 permanent inhabitants, most working in fishing. Two years earlier, Moses Henry Perley studied the fisheries and noted "the people of Grand Manan enjoy perfect free trade. No duties whatever are paid by the inhabitants of Grand Manan, in fact there is no person there authorized to receive duties. The inhabitants take their fish to Eastport or Lubec, and there sell them at low prices takin in return such articles as they need for home consumption...as there is a perfectly good understanding with the fishermen of Maine.".

In 1874, foxes were introduced to the island "unaccountably", which drove gull and tern populations away.

By 1884, Grand Manan became the largest supplier of smoked herring in the world. By 1920, it produced one million boxes—or twenty thousand tons—of smoked herring.

In the late Victorian era, tourists began visiting the island, including author Willa Cather and painters Alfred Thompson Bricher and John James Audubon. Spencer Fullerton Baird carried out a 19th century archaeological study of the island. The Greene brothers, dubbed the "Dark Harbour Hermits", harvested dulse while entertaining hundreds of visitors annually.

In December 1941, the S.S. Hada County hit a shoal and sank off Grand Manan.

In 1967, the Grand Manan Museum was opened, with exhibits including the large lens from the Gannett Rock Lighthouse and taxidermied bird specimens from Allan Moses.

2006 Grand Manan riot: Approximately fifty Islanders engaged in vigilante justice in removing a drug dealer from the island as five, "whom many considered heroes", were criminally charged. NDP candidate Andrew Graham noted "I don't know what it's like to see what crack [cocaine] is doing to your children. It was a pressure cooker and they reached their limit." Investing in the island in the aftermath of the violence which had drawn international headlines, the government built a youth centre and outdoor skating rink.

=== History of smuggling ===
Southwestern New Brunswick smugglers in the late 18th century were "the overwhelming majority of the local political machinery, including the judiciary" — and a 1796 seizure found contraband tied to the "leading figures and magistrates" of Campobello, Grand Manan and Indian Island.

In 1797, a case of self-defence homicide landed in court when John Robinson, William Stewart, Hugh Lamey and Sergeant Stewart were stationed to guard seized contraband goods at Grand Manan, when a group boarded intent on recovering the cargo and a fracas ensued in which William Newcomb was killed.

In 1831 Secretary of the Board of Trade John MacGregor stated his disapproval of Grand Manan, noting "mostly from Maine and resemble Americans in attitude. They have a reputation for being scheming and overreaching...a great smuggling area.", and dismissing Campobello as "another smuggling notch". In 1898, it was noted that the island's high western cliffs and recent American tariffs kept Grand Manan a key smuggling point.

In 1936, a new focus began on smuggling at Petit Manan and Grand Manan, leading to a shifted RCMP focus.

=== History of religion ===
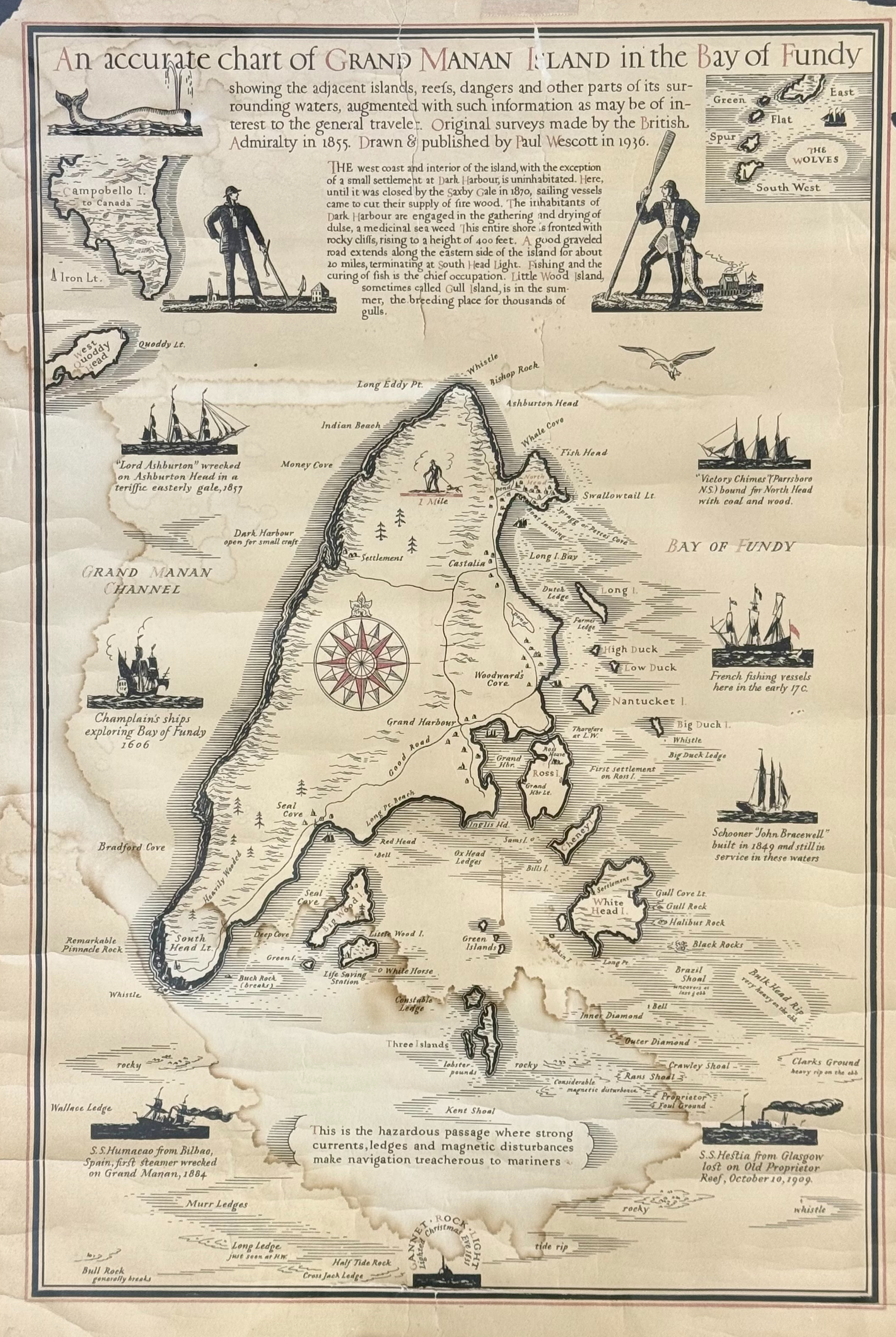
1936 map of Grand Manan by Paul Wescott

In 1820, it was noted the population of 600 on Grand Manan were "totally destitute of religious instruction", and Anglican rector Jerome Alley from St. Andrews set about building a church though it took 12 years to find a rector for it, and John Dunn was not well-liked when he did arrive. In 1838, St. Paul's Anglican Church was the victim of an attempted arson, and in 1839 it was destroyed by arson with an effigy holding a paper that showed "hostility toward the Bishop...the rector...and four other persons of this county"; the government offered a reward for information and many accused Wilfred Fisher or those near him as having had a feud with the rector. It was rebuilt within a year.

Christians' Temple was built in Woodward's Cove by the Baptist minister Mr. Cook, but passed into ownership of Joseph Lakeman who was converted to the Disciples of Christ denomination by the visiting Elder George Garraty, but was later converted to a Latter Day Saints temple after Lakeman declared himself a Mormon. A missionary had been preaching "alongside a Mormon elder" on Grand Manan circa 1870. At its height, it had 45 practising Mormons on the island. It later burned down, and was not rebuilt.

Island community norms "officially prohibited drinking". However, before a provincial liquor store opened in 1972 islanders could legally order liquor and have it delivered on the ferry, and alcohol smuggling was common. In 1975, an outsider from Toronto was disparaged on the island for purchasing the Marathon Hotel and applying for a liquor license angering religious leaders who had blocked liquor licenses on the island five times previously, with local MLA James Tucker noting "It's an atrocity...I'm only taking the side of 95% of the island opposition". A year later, the Marathon's license was revoked – although reinstated in 1982 on condition it serve only hotel patrons and not general island population. During these years, it was also uncommon to find retailers willing to sell cigarettes or cosmetic make-up. In 1995, an outsider purchased a video rental store which transformed into a pizza parlour and then into a pool hall within two years – and received a liquor license, again angering local islanders. By the time of the third liquor license, for a restaurant in North Head, in 2003 – there was no community outrage and alcohol had become normalised. However the 2004 death of three youths from a roadside crash led to concern and intervention for a perceived "escalating alcohol and drug problem".

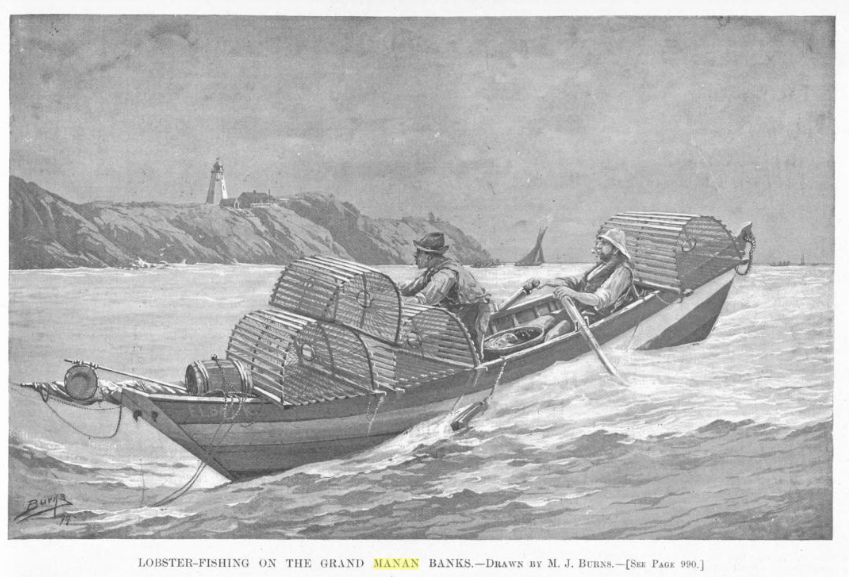
An 1894 illustration of lobster fishers off Grand Manan

With the arrival of Baptist revivalists, Anglicanism faltered and "religion became almost their only entertainment – and remains so." In the 19th century, bursts of religious fervour would see dancing forbidden and amusements frowned upon on Grand Manan for a time, although evangelical missionary zeal was uncommon. Fishermen adhered to a "strict "no-Sunday" rule" which prohibited checking lobster traps or harvesting herring from weirs on Sundays. This community norm persisted until at least 2000 in the community of Seal Cove.

As of 2008 Grand Manan and neighbouring White Head Island were served by fifteen churches. Of these, three were Wesleyan and three Baptist. In 2021 the three Wesleyan churches merged into the Lighthouse Church. There are also two Anglican churches dating back to Loyalist days, three Baptist, and a small Catholic church. As of 2021, 1% of Grand Manan identified as following a religion other than Christianity.

== Geography and Geology ==
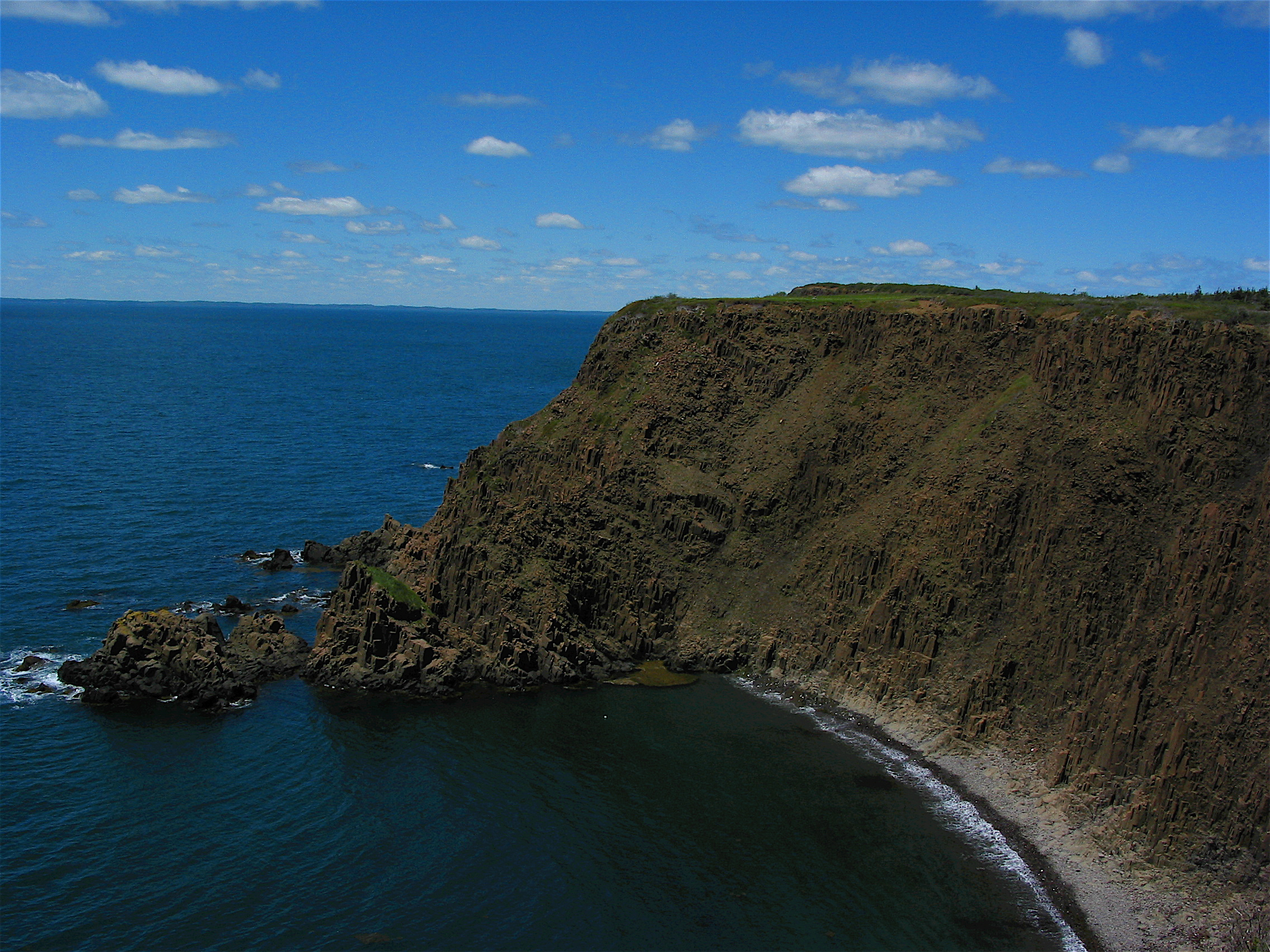
Cliffs of columnar basalt at Southwest Head

Grand Manan Island is the largest of the Fundy Islands, while the Grand Manan archipelago contains other islands such as White Head Island, Ross, Cheney Island, the Wood Islands and dozens of surrounding shoaling rocks.

Grand Manan is 34 km (21 mi) long and has a maximum width of 18 km (11 mi) with an area of 137 km^{2} (53 sq mi). The Western side of the main island and the smaller islands form numerous passages, coves, and rocky reefs. The vast majority of Grand Manan residents live on the eastern side of the island. Due to limited access, 90-metre (300 ft) cliffs and high winds, the western side of the island is not residentially developed.

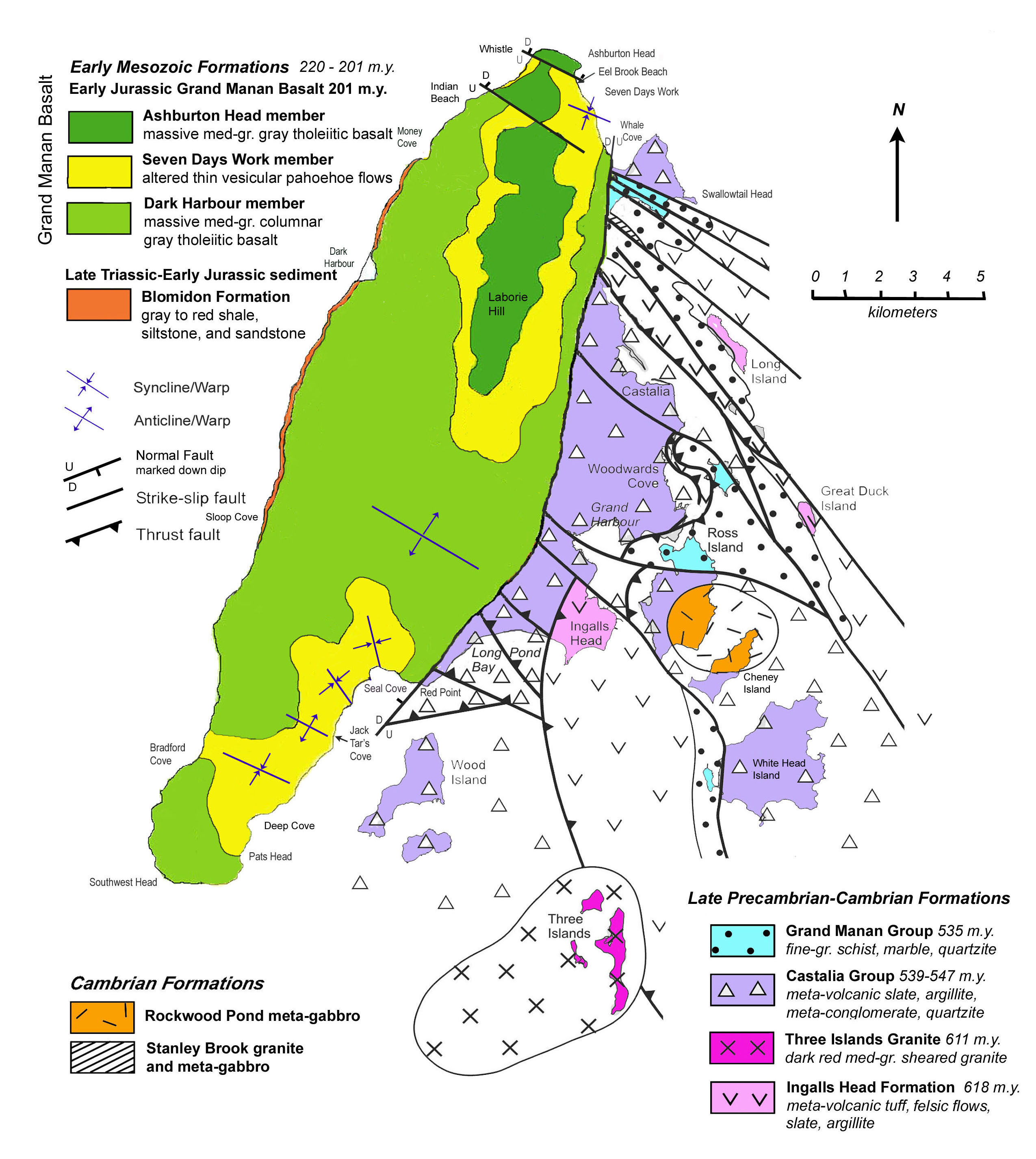
Map of Grand Manan geology

Eastern shore harbours were created by the erosion of complex fault and fold structures in metamorphosed sedimentary and volcanic rock formations. A major north–south fault at Red Point divides these eastern rocks from the western basalts. The metamorphic formations are organized into groups called Castalia, Ingalls Head, and Grand Manan.

There are also metamorphosed plutonic masses such as Stanley Brook Granite, Rockweed Pond Gabbro, and Kent Island Granite and are now considered to correlate with the New River and Mascarene terranes of southern New Brunswick. Although originally they were igneous and sedimentary rocks such as basalt, sandstone, and shale, the eastern formations have been metamorphosed into greenstone, phyllite, argillite, schist, quartzite, and other foliated types. In addition, many folds and faults have bent and broken the formations in rather tortured-looking outcrops. One such fault can be seen at the north end of Pettes Cove, where it separates metabasalt of Swallowtail Head from schist of North Head.

The western two-thirds of the island shows thick basaltic lava flows of Late Triassic age, part of a flood basalt that underlies most of the Bay of Fundy. The Fundy basalts are themselves a small portion of the Central Atlantic Magmatic Province which was formed in a volcanic event preceding the breakup of the supercontinent Pangaea in the Early Jurassic. Many minerals have filled the cracks and bubbles left by gases boiling out of the cooling lavas. They include zeolite minerals such as chabazite, mesolite, stilbite, and heulandite, plus attractive quartz-related amethyst, agate, jasper, and many others. Good collecting areas include Seven Days Work, Indian Beach, and Bradford Cove. A few meters of siltstone are exposed under the basalt along the western shoreline, which by analogy with the Blomidon Formation in Nova Scotia must include the Triassic–Jurassic boundary.

=== Climate ===
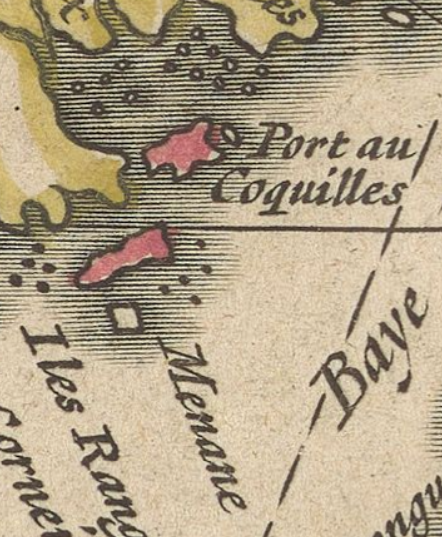
Grand Manan as shown on the 1630 map of Joannes de Laet.

Grand Manan has a humid continental climate (Dfb). The climate in spring, summer and fall is very comfortable but winter has an inconsistent weather pattern with snow, rain, freezing rain and mild weather. Its average of 177 frost-free days is the highest in the province.

Since 2000, the average annual precipitation has been 859.8 mm with August being the driest month (35 mm) and October (112 mm) the wettest.

The highest temperature ever recorded on Grand Manan was 34.2 °C (93.6 °F) on 12 August 2025. The coldest temperature ever recorded was −30.6 °C (−23 °F) on 10 January 1890.

Climate data for Grand Manan Airport, 1991–2020 normals, extremes 1883–present (Note: 1981–2010 normals are derived from data collected at Seal Cove, however extreme high and low temperatures have been recorded on various parts of the island since 1883. Based on station coordinates, climate data was recorded in the area of Castalia from July 1883 to April 1912 and again from July 1962 to March 1965, at Seal Cove from November 1987 to February 2004 and at Grand Manan Airport from November 2000 to present.)
| Month | Jan | Feb | Mar | Apr | May | Jun | Jul | Aug | Sep | Oct | Nov | Dec | Year |
|---|---|---|---|---|---|---|---|---|---|---|---|---|---|
| Record high °C (°F) | 16.1 (61.0) | 15.0 (59.0) | 25.6 (78.1) | 23.9 (75.0) | 30.5 (86.9) | 32.8 (91.0) | 33.3 (91.9) | 34.2 (93.6) | 31.9 (89.4) | 27.0 (80.6) | 20.6 (69.1) | 18.7 (65.7) | 34.2 (93.6) |
| Mean daily maximum °C (°F) | −0.4 (31.3) | 0.3 (32.5) | 3.6 (38.5) | 9.1 (48.4) | 14.4 (57.9) | 19.3 (66.7) | 22.8 (73.0) | 23.0 (73.4) | 19.2 (66.6) | 13.3 (55.9) | 8.1 (46.6) | 2.8 (37.0) | 11.3 (52.3) |
| Daily mean °C (°F) | −4.8 (23.4) | −4.3 (24.3) | −0.8 (30.6) | 4.6 (40.3) | 9.4 (48.9) | 14.0 (57.2) | 17.6 (63.7) | 17.5 (63.5) | 13.8 (56.8) | 8.7 (47.7) | 4.0 (39.2) | −1.3 (29.7) | 6.5 (43.7) |
| Mean daily minimum °C (°F) | −9.2 (15.4) | −8.8 (16.2) | −5.0 (23.0) | 0.1 (32.2) | 4.4 (39.9) | 8.7 (47.7) | 12.4 (54.3) | 12.0 (53.6) | 8.4 (47.1) | 4.0 (39.2) | −0.2 (31.6) | −5.4 (22.3) | 1.8 (35.2) |
| Record low °C (°F) | −30.6 (−23.1) | −26.3 (−15.3) | −23.9 (−11.0) | −13.6 (7.5) | −3.9 (25.0) | −5.0 (23.0) | 3.0 (37.4) | 0.7 (33.3) | −3.3 (26.1) | −7.6 (18.3) | −16.7 (1.9) | −28.0 (−18.4) | −30.6 (−23.1) |
| Average precipitation mm (inches) | 128.9 (5.07) | 87.5 (3.44) | 114.5 (4.51) | 98.6 (3.88) | 101.1 (3.98) | 81.9 (3.22) | 74.9 (2.95) | 73.3 (2.89) | 112.7 (4.44) | 123.2 (4.85) | 134.0 (5.28) | 121.6 (4.79) | 1,252.2 (49.30) |
| Average rainfall mm (inches) | 79.5 (3.13) | 52.7 (2.07) | 78.1 (3.07) | 83.1 (3.27) | 100.9 (3.97) | 81.9 (3.22) | 74.9 (2.95) | 73.3 (2.89) | 112.7 (4.44) | 123.2 (4.85) | 127.8 (5.03) | 95.0 (3.74) | 1,082.9 (42.63) |
| Average snowfall cm (inches) | 49.5 (19.5) | 34.8 (13.7) | 36.5 (14.4) | 15.5 (6.1) | 0.2 (0.1) | 0.0 (0.0) | 0.0 (0.0) | 0.0 (0.0) | 0.0 (0.0) | 0.0 (0.0) | 6.1 (2.4) | 26.6 (10.5) | 169.3 (66.7) |
| Average precipitation days (≥ 0.2 mm) | 13.1 | 9.9 | 13.1 | 14.6 | 15.8 | 15.9 | 14.6 | 14.9 | 15.6 | 15.7 | 16.4 | 13.9 | 173.6 |
| Average rainy days (≥ 0.2 mm) | 7.1 | 5.3 | 9.6 | 13.3 | 15.7 | 15.9 | 14.6 | 14.9 | 15.6 | 15.7 | 15.8 | 10.3 | 153.9 |
| Average snowy days (≥ 0.2 cm) | 6.5 | 5.4 | 5.0 | 2.2 | 0.08 | 0.0 | 0.0 | 0.0 | 0.0 | 0.0 | 1.3 | 4.5 | 25.0 |
Source: Environment Canada (precipitation, rain, snow 1981–2010 recorded at Seal Cove)

== Economy ==
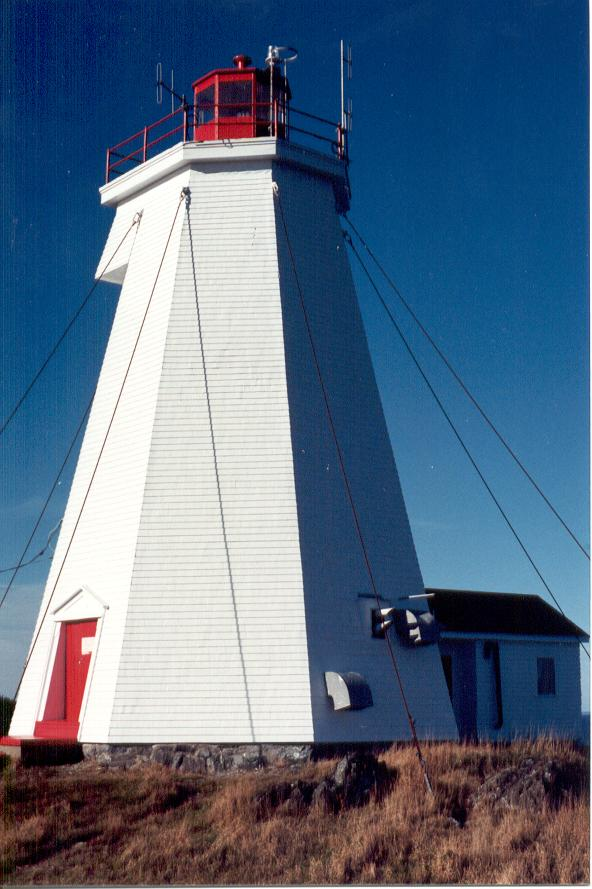
Swallowtail Lighthouse

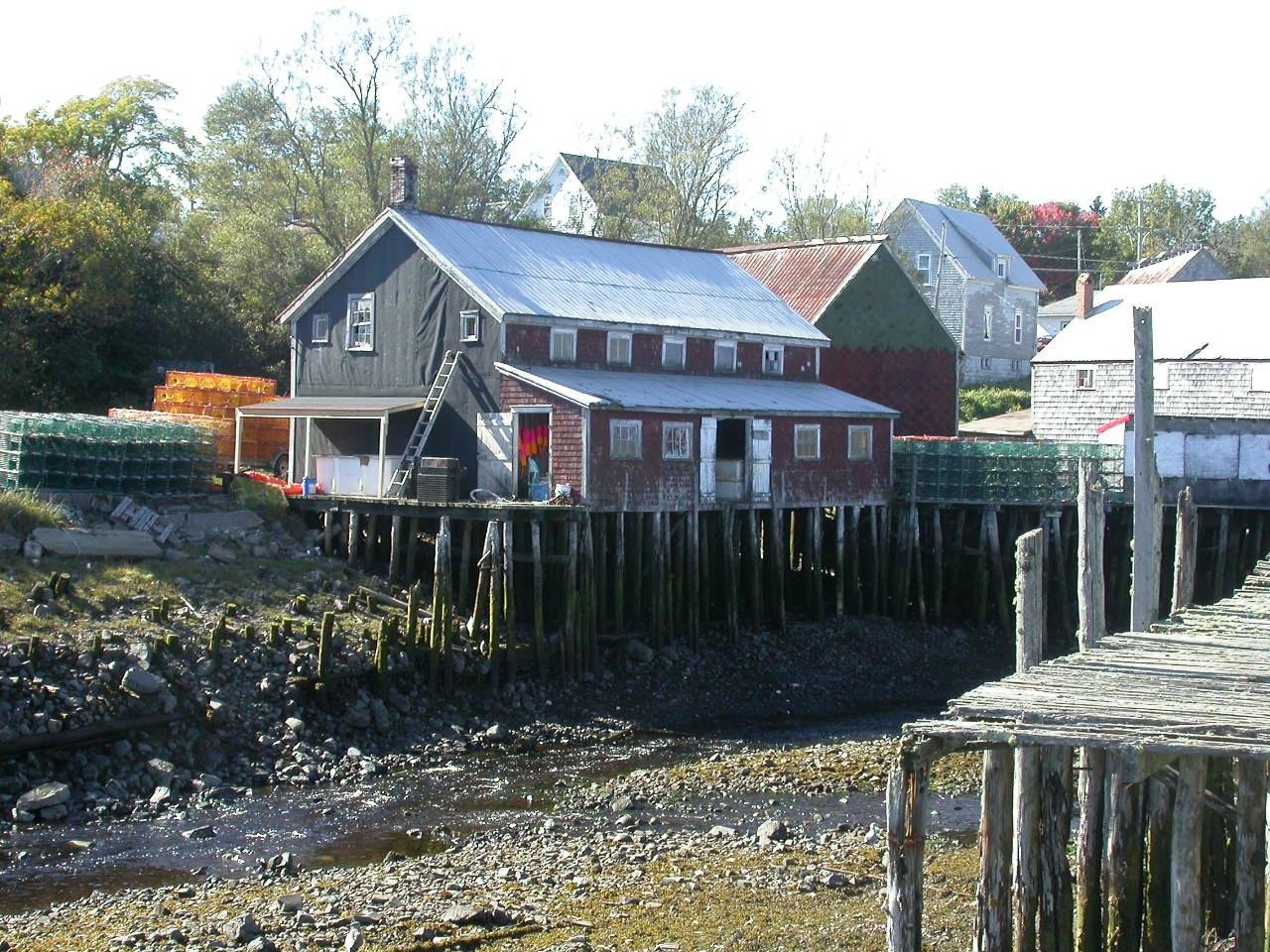
Seal Cove, a National Historic Site of Canada, relatively unchanged since the late 19th century

Grand Manan's economy is dependent upon aquaculture, tourism and fishing which includes lobster, herring, scallops and crab. Together with ocean salmon farms, dulse, rock weed and clam digging, many residents make their living "on the water." The Anchorage Provincial Park draws campers to the island.

Tourism is growing significantly, supported by whale and bird watching, camping and kayaking. New York architect Michael Zimmer established the Sardine Museum and Herring Hall of Fame.

There are freshwater ponds, lakes and beaches that are prime locations for sunbathing, beachcombing, and picnics. Other interesting finds on Grand Manan are magnetic sand, and "Hole-In-The Wall" located in Whale Cove.

== Demographics ==
In the 2021 Census of Population, Grand Manan had a population of 2,595 living in 1,179 of its 1,408 total private residences. The village was formed in 1995 by the amalgamation of the villages of Grand Harbour, North Head, and Seal Cove, along with the local service districts of Castalia and Woodwards Cove, and any other part of the parish that wasn't in the local service district of White Head Island.

Grand Manan federal election results
| Year | Liberal | | Conservative | | New Democratic | | Green | |
|---|---|---|---|---|---|---|---|---|
| 2021 | 20% | 225 | 41% | 472 | 13% | 146 | 5% | 62 |
| 2019 | 23% | 290 | 41% | 503 | 12% | 146 | 13% | 155 |

Grand Manan provincial election results
| Year | PC | | Liberal | | Green | | PANB. | | Libertarian | |
|---|---|---|---|---|---|---|---|---|---|---|
| 2024 | 52% | 381 | 32% | 287 | 9% | 69 | - | - | 1% | 9 |
| 2020 | 67% | 640 | 8% | 73 | 8% | 81 | 9% | 83 | | |
| 2018 | 30% | 342 | 37% | 425 | 5% | 61 | 27% | 310 | | |

== Infrastructure ==
Grand Manan Hospital

By 1832 schools were established by the Episcopalian Church. The Anglophone South School District operates the K–12 Grand Manan Community School. A skate park was added in 2021.

The Grand Manan Hospital, operated by Horizon Health Network, provides family medicine, emergency medicine and palliative care. The hospital also has an eight-bed inpatient unit. There are onsite diabetes clinics, physiotherapy as well as telemedicine. Diagnostics include x-ray, EKG, and blood and specimen collecting. The ambulance station contains a memorial garden in honour of paramedic Billy Mallock and pilot Klaus Sonenberg who were killed when a medevac plane crashed in 2014.

The island is served by the Grand Manan Airport.

Grand Manan Adventure ferry at Blacks Harbour

New Brunswick Route 776 is the main road on Grand Manan, running on a north–south alignment along the island's eastern coast. Until the 1990s, houses were unnumbered and many streets lacked names.

In March 1976, a vote of residents on Grand Manan showed 100% agreed to withhold payment of provincial property taxes until a second ferry was put in service.

The 90-minute ferry from Blacks Harbour to Grand Manan is operated by Coastal Transport Limited. In 2023, Canada Post issued a series of postage stamps involving five ferries including the Grand Manan V.

There also exists a 30-minute ferry serving the 200 residents of White Head Island from Ingalls Head.

== See also ==
- List of communities in New Brunswick
- List of islands of New Brunswick
- List of people from Charlotte County, New Brunswick
