= St. Paul's Anglican Church (Grand Manan) =

Church in New Brunswick, Canada

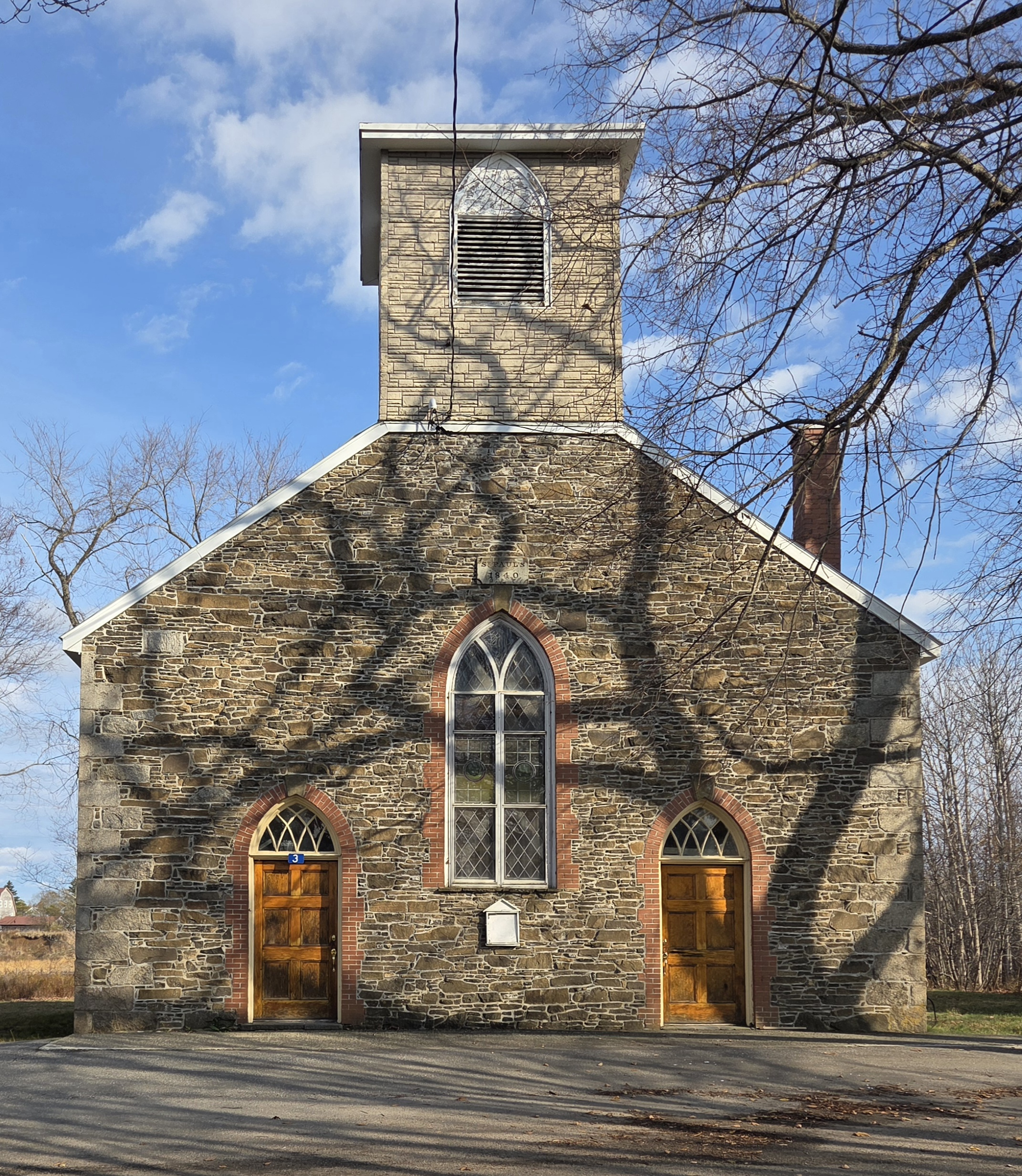
- St. Paul's Church in 2025
- St. Paul's Anglican Church
- 44.68369°N 66.774519°W
- Address: 3 Ingalls Head Road, Grand Manan
- Country: Canada
- Denomination: Anglican
- Website: nb.anglican.ca/st-andrews/st-paul-grand-harbour--63

History
- Status: Church
- Consecrated: 1845

Architecture
- Completed: 1840

Specifications
- Materials: stone

Administration
- Diocese: Fredericton
- Parish: Grand Manan

St. Paul's Church is a small Anglican church in the community of Grand Harbour on the island of Grand Manan, New Brunswick, Canada. Built of local stone and completed in 1840, it is the second oldest stone church in New Brunswick. It was built to replace an earlier structure which was destroyed by arson in 1839.

== The wooden church ==
In 1786 the New Brunswick Legislature established the Church of England as the province's official Church. The province granted the Church tracts of Crown land intended to provide the clergy in each parish with an income from stumpage and later from rents for the cleared land, as well as glebe lands where churches and schools could be built. On Grand Manan the Church was allotted over 1200 acres of forested land and a 30 acre glebe in the village of Grand Harbour.

The rector of St. Andrews, Jerome Alley, visited the island twice in 1820 to preach and perform baptisms. He led a fundraising campaign for the construction of a church on Grand Manan and appealed to the Society for the Propagation of the Gospel (SPG) to send a resident missionary. A small wooden clapboarded church, built by the islanders themselves over a period of three years, opened in December 1823.

The SPG sent The Reverend Cornelius Griffin, a young English minister who had been acting as assistant to the rector of Charlottetown, to Grand Manan in 1824. Griffin was dissatisfied with his living conditions and soon quarrelled with leading citizens including Captain William Ross, the Vestry leader, culminating in April 1825 in a "shoving match" between Griffin and Ross at a meeting in the church. In May 1825 he was ordered by the Ecclesiastical Commissary to leave Grand Manan.

In 1830 Jerome Alley again visited Grand Manan, this time accompanied by John Inglis, the bishop of Nova Scotia. The citizens, who had been without a minister since Griffin's departure, asked the bishop to appoint another clergyman. They also began raising money to build a parsonage. A newly ordained minister, John Dunn, took up residence on the island in 1832. In 1835 Dunn was named rector of the newly established parish of Grand Manan.

Over time Dunn came into conflict with Wilford Fisher, a prominent citizen and financial supporter of the church who, as well as being a wealthy merchant, magistrate, commissioner of roads, and captain of militia, had an interest in shipbuilding and lumber. They quarrelled over the rights to the timber on the glebe lands, where stumpage fees went to the church. Parishioners took sides in the dispute, resulting in "two camps, one supporting the rector, the other supporting the magistrate".

== The arson attack ==
The wooden church was destroyed in an arson attack on the night of 9 October 1839. An effigy was found hanging by a noose in a nearby tree dressed as a clergyman in "a long black waistcoat, satin vest, a pair of black pantaloons, white gloves and black boots". The Vestry offered a reward of £100 for information about the crime and insured the parsonage for £200. The lieutenant governor sent William Boyd Kinnear, a lawyer and member of the Legislative Council of New Brunswick, to conduct a judicial inquiry. Fisher and two other men who worked for him were charged with arson. The trial was held in St. Andrews over three days in May 1840. All three defendants were acquitted by the jury "without leaving the box".

== The stone church ==
At its meeting in November 1839 the Vestry decided to rebuild the church out of stone on the old foundation, adding five feet to the length in order to accommodate a gallery. A total of £566 was raised by subscriptions from Grand Manan and other communities for the new building. The building used 636 tons of stone quarried on the island and hauled to the site by teams of oxen. Local spruce and pine were used for the floor, inside walls and roof. The overall contractor, Cornelius Connelly, was a stonemason who arrived on Grand Manan in the summer of 1840. The structure was completed by July 1840 although the interior had not been finished and the building lacked a bell tower. The total cost of the building was £719.

The rector's wife, Anne Dunn, travelled to England in July 1841 to solicit donations in order to discharge the debt owing for the construction and to pay for work that remained to be done. She returned over a year later, having raised £652 from donors in Liverpool, London, Bristol, Bath, Cheltenham and Brighton. The funds allowed the church to be completed with the interior painted, pews and pulpit built, and a bell tower constructed.

John Dunn left Grand Manan in 1844. In August 1845 John Medley, the newly appointed bishop of Fredericton, visited the island and consecrated the new church. He also ordained the new rector, James Neales and another clergyman, Thomas McGhee.

On a visit to the island in 1849 Bishop Medley arranged for the pulpit, "a magnificent three-tiered monument to the congregationalist tradition of the parish" to be altered in accordance with his Anglo-Catholic principles. The steeple has also been changed, but the rest of the exterior has not changed since the building was constructed.

The building was added to the Canadian Register of Historic Places in 2010.
