= New Brunswick Route 776 =

Highway in New Brunswick

Route 776

Route information
- Maintained by New Brunswick Department of Transportation
- Length: 28.0 km (17.4 mi)

Major junctions
- North end: Route 176 / Blacks Harbour-Grand Manan Island Ferry in North Head
- South end: Southwest Head

Location
- Country: Canada
- Province: New Brunswick
- Major cities: Grand Manan Island

Highway system
- Provincial highways in New Brunswick; Former routes
← Route 774	→ Route 778

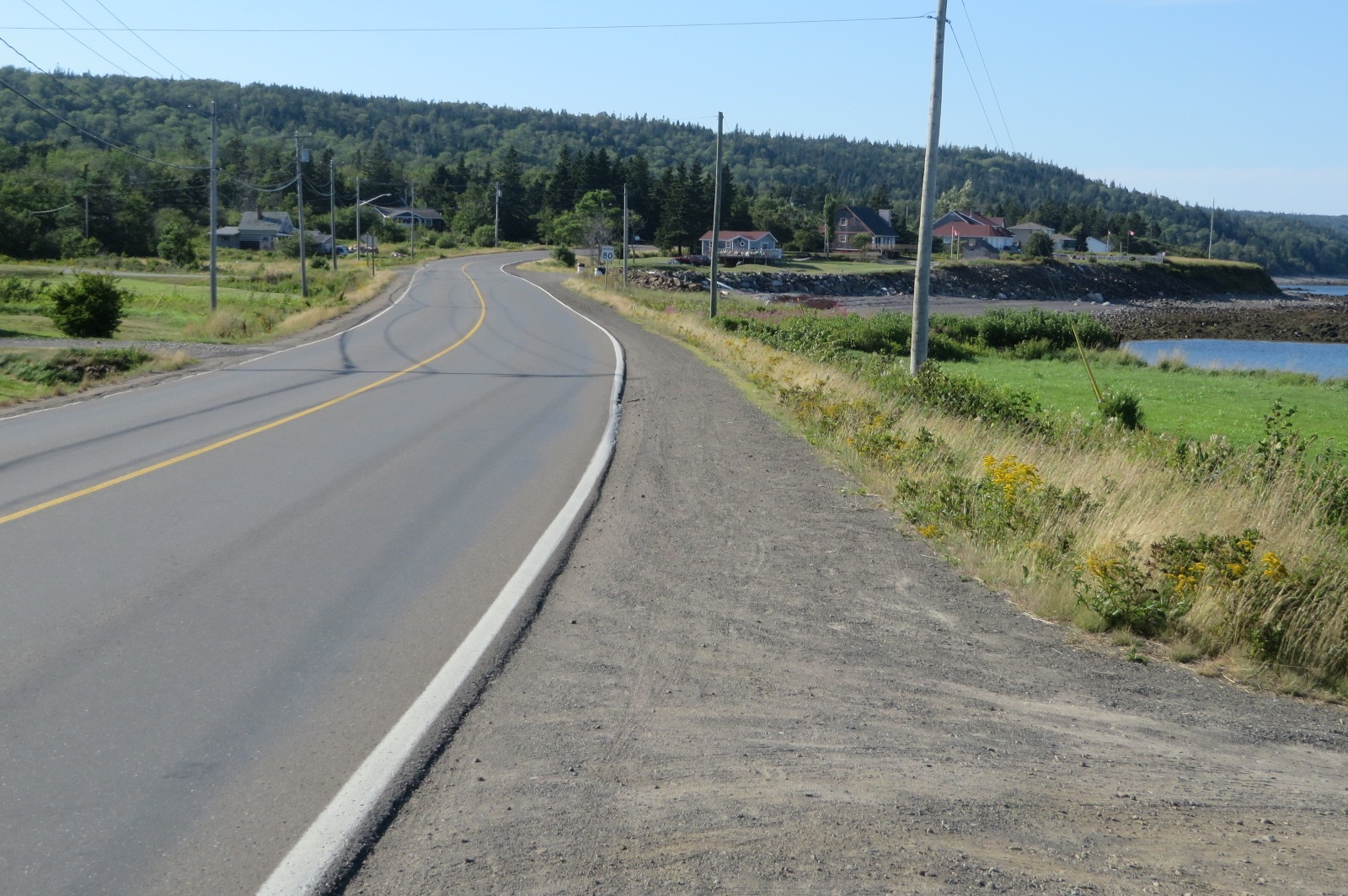
Route 776 north of Castalia

Route 776 is a provincial highway in New Brunswick, Canada. It serves as the main road on Charlotte County's Grand Manan Island, following the entire eastern coast of the island.

The northern terminus of Route 776 is at the Coastal Transport Limited ferry terminal at the top of Ferry Wharf Road in the community of North Head. The road continues south through Castalia, Woodwards Cove, Grand Harbour, Seal Cove, and Deep Cove. The southern terminus is at Southwest Head's, Canadian Coast Guard light station atop 300-foot (91 m) cliffs.

The community of Ingalls Head is the only major population centre on Grand Manan Island not having direct access to Route 776.

== Prominent addresses on Rte 776 ==
- 1120 Rte 776, "Isaac Newton House" heritage site.
