= Swallowtail Lighthouse =

Lighthouse in Grand Manan, Canada

Swallowtail Lighthouse Swallowtail Lighthouse
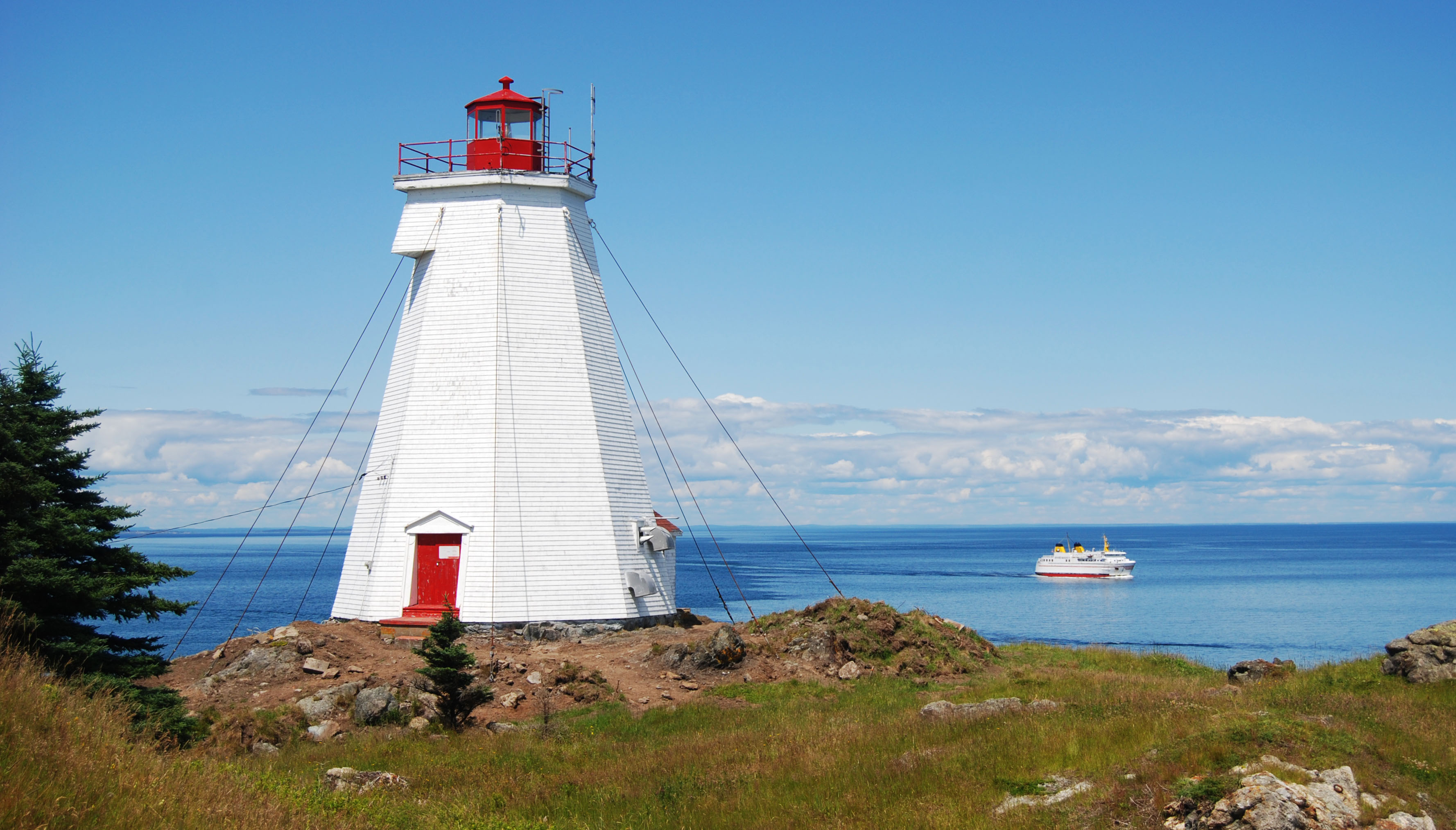
- Swallowtail Lighthouse in 2009
- Location: Grand Manan, Grand Manan, Grand Manan, Canada
- Coordinates: 44°46′N 66°44′W

Tower
- Constructed: 1859
- Foundation: stone
- Construction: wood
- Automated: 1986
- Height: 16.2 m (53 ft)
- Shape: octagonal tower
- Markings: white tower, red lantern
- Heritage: Recognized Heritage Federal Building (1991)
- Fog signal: Horn: blast 2 s; sil. 18 s. Horn points 100°

Light
- First lit: 1860
- Focal height: 37.1 m (122 ft)
- Range: 4 nmi (7.4 km; 4.6 mi)
- Characteristic: Fl4 s; eclipse 2s

The Swallowtail Lighthouse is a Canadian lighthouse located on Grand Manan Island in the Bay of Fundy. It was the first lighthouse to be built on the island. It was first lit on 7 July 1860 and was automated and de-staffed in 1986.

== Origin ==
The wreck of the merchant ship Lord Ashburton in 1857 on the northern tip of Grand Manan, with the loss of 21 lives, led the New Brunswick Legislative Assembly to call for "a Light House to be erected on the Northern Head of Grand Manan". The site chosen was a headland called the "Swallow's Tail" near the entrance to the harbour at North Head. The lighthouse tower and keeper's dwelling were built in 1859 at a cost of £495 and the lantern was first lit on 7 July 1860. It was the first lighthouse to be built on the island of Grand Manan.

== Infrastructure ==
The light was originally provided by nine lamps and reflectors, which were later increased to ten. In 1887 a lens replaced the lamps and reflectors. In 1907 a fourth-order Fresnel lens was installed, providing 360° coverage.

A wooden tower was built in 1914, and a fog bell added to it in 1916 when renovations were done on the keeper's residence. The fog bell tower was moved in 1920 to a position closer to the lighthouse. In 1958 a new keeper's house was built, replacing the original dwelling. In the 1960s the lighthouse keeper had a boathouse moved from another lighthouse to the Swallowtail light station. In 1980 the fog bell was removed and put on display at the Grand Manan Museum. The lighthouse was automated and de-staffed in 1986.

== Significance ==
The lighthouse, which is visible from the ferry as it approaches and leaves the terminus at North Head, has been called "the island's signature vista". It has regularly featured in New Brunswick tourism materials and has been recognized by the federal government as "a long-standing symbol of the maritime heritage of the region".

== Conservation ==
The village of North Head purchased the de-staffed but still operational light station's land and buildings, other than the lighthouse tower, from the federal government in 1994. In 1996 it became the property of the newly amalgamated village of Grand Manan. The lighthouse keeper's residence was used as a bed and breakfast for several years, closing in 2004. In 2008 the village council announced plans to sell the house, but reversed the decision in the face of the community's negative response. An organization called Save Swallowtail was formed in order to clean up and repair the building. In 2009 the village leased the keeper's house to the organization, which had become the Swallowtail Keepers Society, for 20 years.

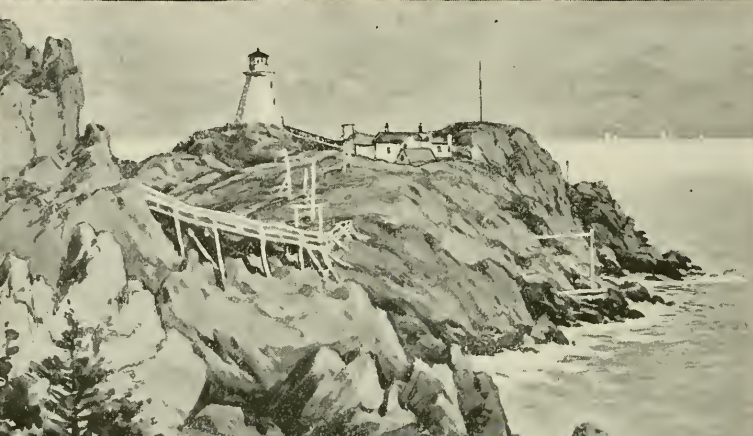
An 1893 sketch of Swallowtail Lighthouse

In 2010, Swallowtail light was included on a list of 976 lighthouses declared "surplus" by the Canadian Coast Guard. The Swallowtail Keepers Society undertook to acquire and maintain the lighthouse and remaining property, and received a $55,000 grant from the New Brunswick government at a ceremony marking the Swallowtail's 150th anniversary.

In 2012 the fog bell, which had been housed at the Grand Manan Museum since 1980, was returned to the site, where it is displayed on a new wooden deck near the keeper's house.

The Swallowtail Keepers Society took over the lighthouse property in July 2013. Later that year, federal, provincial and municipal government grants and community fundraising resulted in over $200,000 "to build a boardwalk, improve the footbridge, produce marketing materials and cover project administrative costs at the iconic lighthouse".

In 2023 the lighthouse underwent major repairs and had its shingles replaced at a cost of over $500,000, which was fundraised over two years and included federal and provincial government contributions. The Canadian Coast Guard used a helicopter to transport the construction materials to the site.

== See also ==
- List of lighthouses in New Brunswick
- List of lighthouses in Canada
