= Seal Cove, New Brunswick =

Community in New Brunswick

Coordinates: 44.652°N 66.840°W

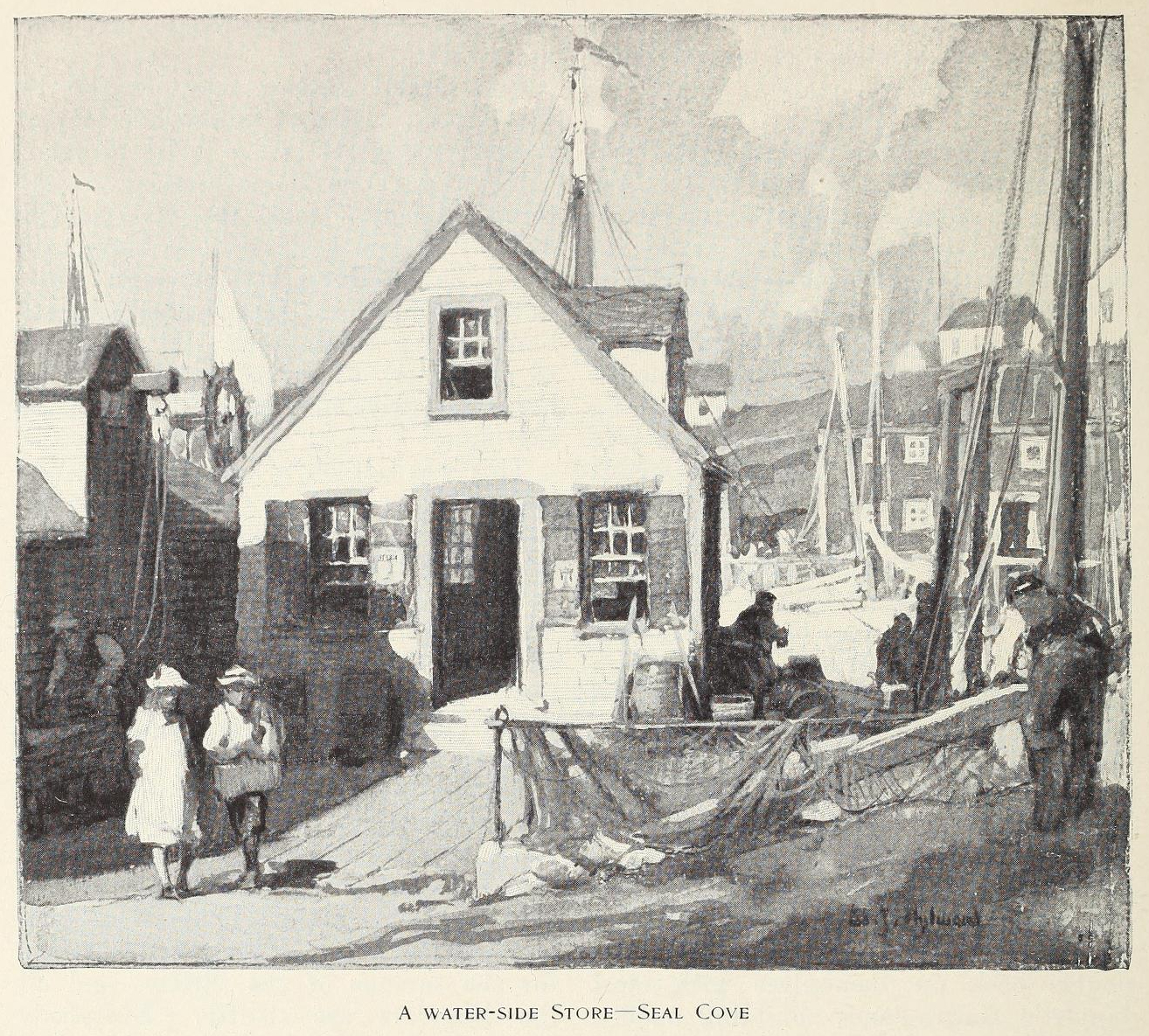
An illustration of the shopfront in Seal Cove, Grand Manan.

Seal Cove is a community on Grand Manan Island, New Brunswick.

== History ==
Federal census population history of Seal Cove
Year	Pop.	±%
1971	613	—
1976	526	−14.2%
1981	548	+4.2%
1986	522	−4.7%
1991	549	+5.2%
Source: Statistics Canada

Seal Cove was first settled in 1785 likely by a fugitive named Wheeler who associated with counterfeiters named Ball, Gates and Woodbury from the St. Croix area.

On June 9 1813, Edward Snow sailed the Weazel to Seal Cove to hide from pursuing ships after his theft of sugar and household items as part of the War of 1812.

Formerly a separate village, Seal Cove was amalgamated into the newly formed village of Grand Manan in 1995.

== See also ==
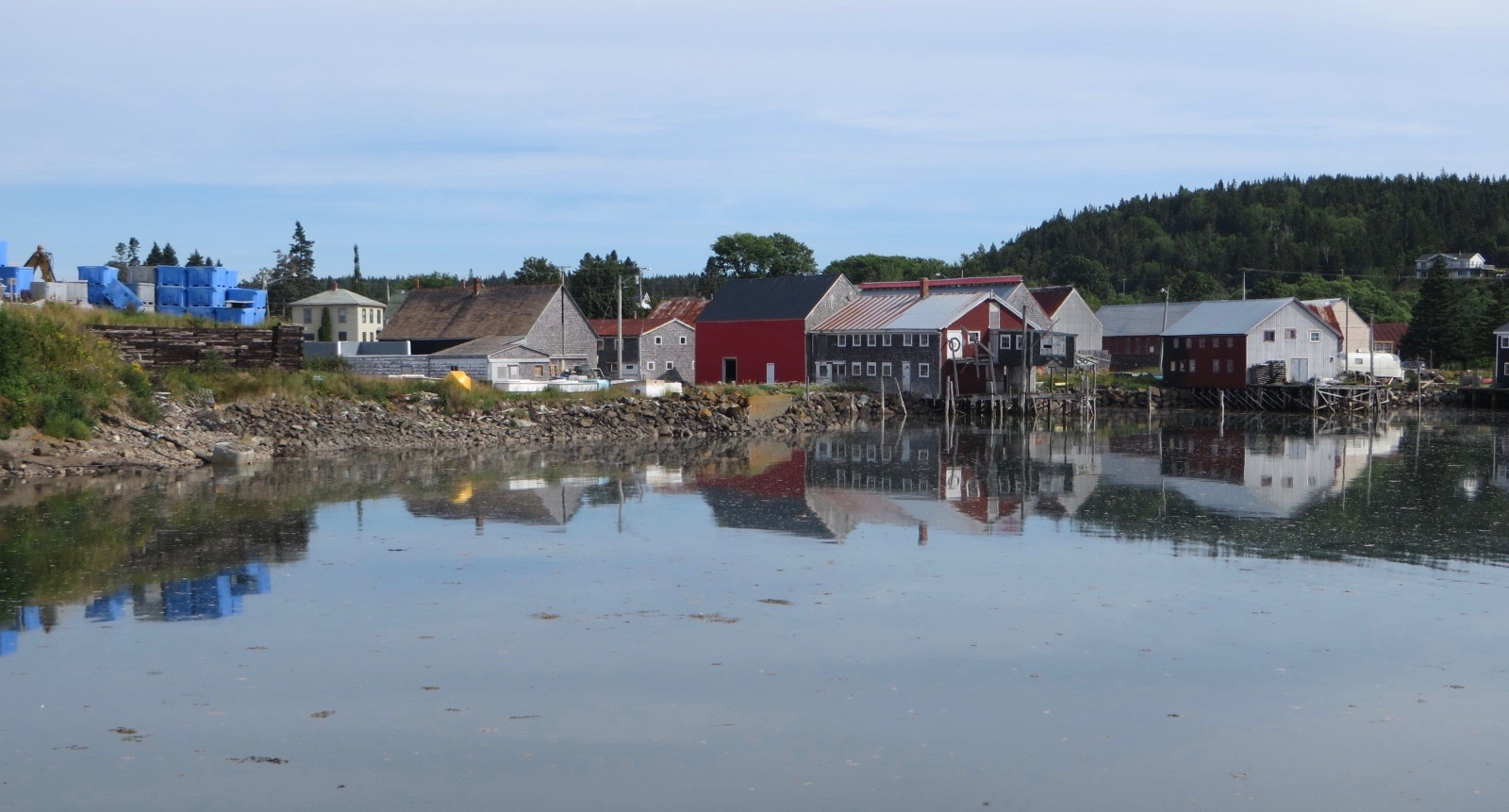
Seal Cove

- List of communities in New Brunswick
