= Beans Island =

Island in New Brunswick, Canada

Native name: Muskoont'kik.
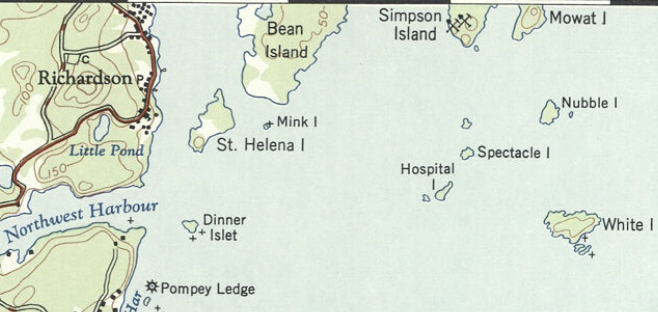
- Interactive map of Beans Island

Geography
- Location: Bay of Fundy
- Coordinates: 44°59′55″N 66°55′59″W

Administration
- Canada
- Province: New Brunswick
- County: Charlotte
- Parish: West Isles Parish

Beans Island (also called Bains Island) is a small uninhabited island in the West Isles Parish of Charlotte County, New Brunswick, Canada, where the Bay of Fundy enters Passamaquoddy Bay. It is particularly known for being the site of North America's first lobster pound. The island has long since been abandoned. though its shores house a series of salmon hatcheries.

It is composed of heavy beds of pinkish chert felsite.

== History ==
It was granted to John Bean in 1806, with the grant also naming John and David Mowat, of Mowat's Island. William Martin Trecartin married Sarah Mary Drake in 1810, after which they relocated to Beans Island.

Later, the population grew and George Case and two families petitioned the province for funds for a school in 1828 but been denied, although one was later built. In 1832, Thomas Baillie wrote that Beans Island had only two families settled on it.

In 1859, Peter Leslie was born on the island. In 1900, one of the earliest pioneers Andrew Lord died on Beans Island, and was buried at Lord's Cove. Benjamin Simpson also lived on the island at this time.

In the late 1800s, the Green law family operated a small sardine, lobster and clam factory at Factory Cove on the island, with a supplemental building at the southwest end of the island near Mink Island passage.

In Summer 2012, the island was one of four studied as a rockweed habitat as it is commercially harvested here by locals.
