= Parker Island (New Brunswick) =

Island in New Brunswick, Canada

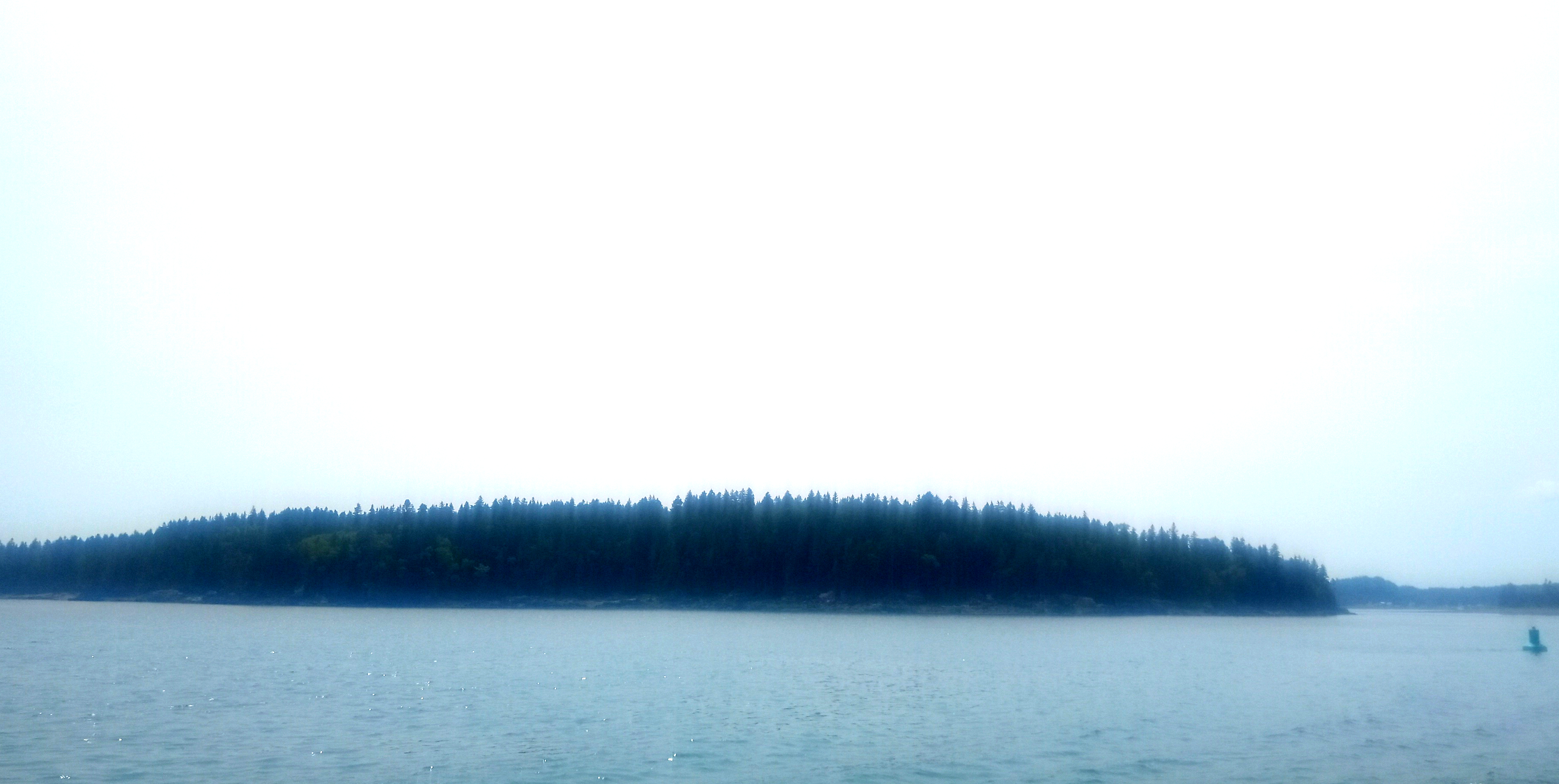
- Parkers island as seen from the north-west
- Interactive map of Parker Island

Geography
- Location: Bay of Fundy
- Coordinates: 45°1′50″N 66°55′1″W
- Area: 71 acres (29 ha)
- Highest elevation: 29 m (95 ft)

Administration
- Canada
- Province: New Brunswick
- County: Charlotte
- Parish: West Isles Parish

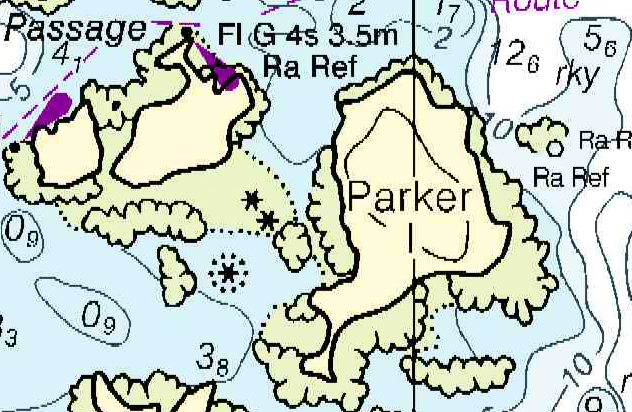
Map of the island

Parker Island is an undeveloped island in the West Isles Parish of Charlotte County, New Brunswick, Canada, where the Bay of Fundy enters Passamaquoddy Bay.

In 1832, Thomas Baillie wrote of an island south of Macs Island "which has been settled, but now is deserted. It contains about fifty acres, and is fit for a fisherman.", which could reference Parker or Jameson Island.

== Geography and composition ==
Jameson, Crow, Hardwood, Parker and Partridge Island are all share a land shelf north of Deer Island, where the waters are generally less than 10m below mean sea level in depth.

In December 1985, a study by Parks Canada assessed the island's value as $26,100.

In the summer of 1986, benthic algae sublittoral research stations were set up across the region including on Parker Island.

As of 2000, sea cucumber harvesting happened between Parker Island and Macs Island.
