= Jameson Island =

Island in New Brunswick, Canada

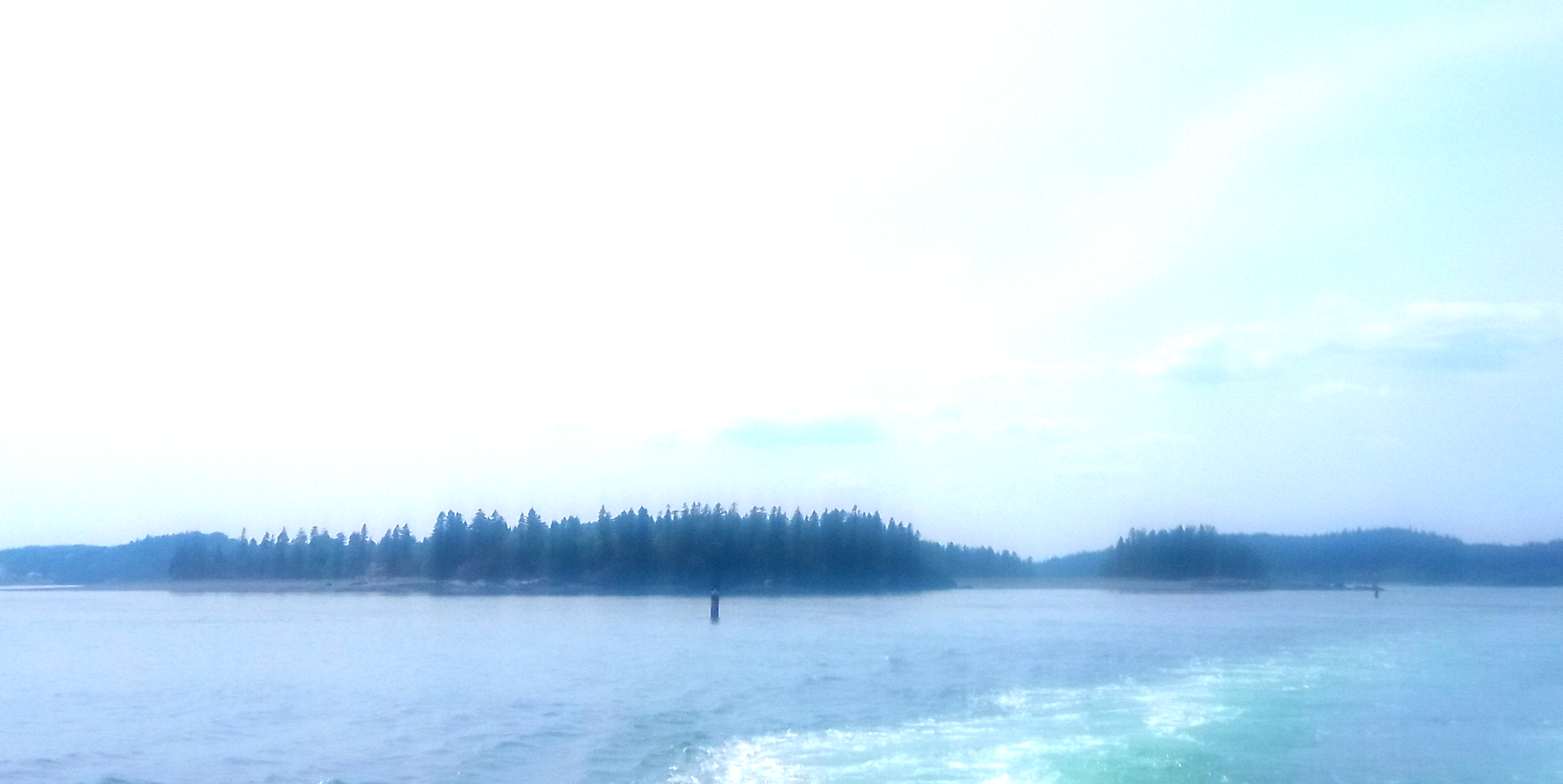
- Jameson Island as seen from the north-west.
- Interactive map of Jameson Island

Geography
- Location: Bay of Fundy
- Coordinates: 45.03252°N 66.92649°W

Administration
- Canada
- Province: New Brunswick
- County: Charlotte
- Parish: West Isles Parish

Jameson Island (formerly called Hog Island) is an undeveloped island in the West Isles Parish of Charlotte County, New Brunswick, Canada, where the Bay of Fundy enters Passamaquoddy Bay.

There is a geodetic triangulation station on the highest point. There is a green cylindrical mast light navigation aid, that operates at night.

The Deer Island ferry service runs between Macs and Pendleton Island on the northwest, and Jameson Island on the southeast.

== Geography and composition ==
Jameson, Crow, Hardwood, Parker and Partridge Island are all share a land shelf north of Deer Island, where the waters are generally less than 10m below mean sea level in depth.

== History ==
George Alexander Jameson was born Dec 29 1819 on the island, to parents John Alexander Jameson and Elizabeth Bonney.

In 1832, Thomas Baillie wrote of an island south of Macs Island "which has been settled, but now is deserted. It contains about fifty acres, and is fit for a fisherman.", which could reference Jameson or Parker Island.

As of 2009, Vincent Pine was living in the only house on the island.
