= Popes Island (New Brunswick) =

Island in New Brunswick, Canada

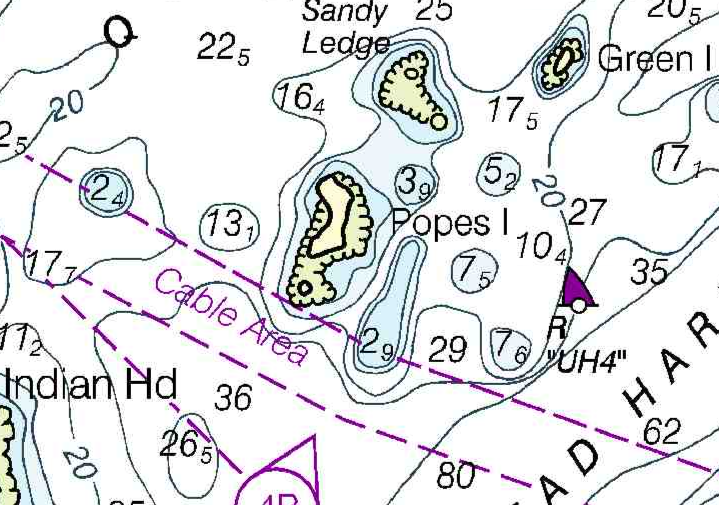
- NOAA Chart of Popes Island
- Interactive map of Popes Island

Geography
- Location: Bay of Fundy
- Coordinates: 44°56′40″N 66°57′11″W
- Area: 4.2 acres (1.7 ha)

Administration
- Canada
- Province: New Brunswick
- County: Charlotte
- Parish: West Isles Parish

Popes Island is an undeveloped island in the West Isles Parish of Charlotte County, New Brunswick, Canada, where the Bay of Fundy enters Passamaquoddy Bay.

As Warren Hatheway was unsuccessful in his bid to be granted Bar Island off the northern shore of Deer Island against the wishes of Thomas Farrell, between 1810-1817 he was awarded a grant of six small nearby islets including Hardwood Island, Popes Island, Nubble Island, Dinner Island Simpsons Island and Fish Island.

There is a seven-fathom patch between Pope's and Chocolate Cove.

In 1832, commissioner of Crown Lands Thomas Baillie wrote that the island had "very little value".

In December 1985, a study by Parks Canada assessed the island's value as $3,600.
