= New Ireland (New Brunswick) =

Island in New Brunswick, Canada

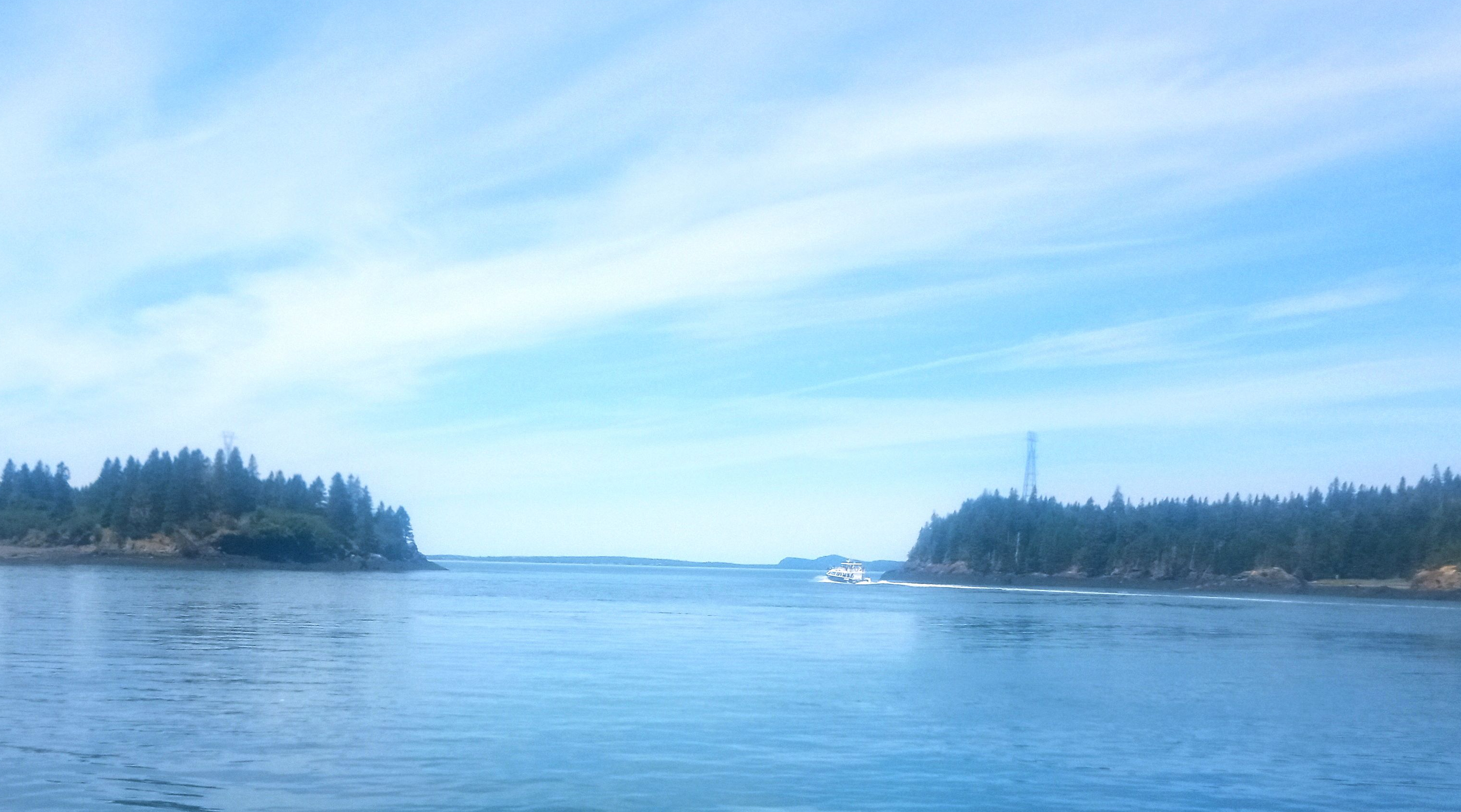
- A whale watching ship takes passengers through Doyle's Passage between Pendleton Island (left), and Macs Island (right) witih New Ireland in the foreground.
- Interactive map of New Ireland

Geography
- Location: Bay of Fundy
- Coordinates: 45°2′6″N 66°56′15″W

Administration
- Canada
- Province: New Brunswick
- County: Charlotte
- Parish: West Isles Parish

New Ireland is an undeveloped island in the West Isles Parish of Charlotte County, New Brunswick, Canada, where the Bay of Fundy enters Passamaquoddy Bay. It is situated between Pendleton's Island and Macs Island.

In 1780, local Loyalist settlers Robert Pagan, Thomas Wyer, Dr. John Califf and Jeremiah Pote proposed a new colony named "New Ireland" be created on Penobscot Bay; however, when a trip to England failed to secure its actualisation, the plan faltered and the group largely settled in St. Andrews.

Gert Pendleton, of Pendleton's Island, once rowed the dingy with three younger children to New Ireland to pick gooseberries but got the boat stuck inside the fishing weir and required rescue.

There is a light buoy marked SJ4 at New Ireland.

In 1973, the provincial government published notice in the Royal Gazette of its intention to seize New Ireland under the Abandoned Lands Act., causing the Pendleton family to obtain a lawyer to dispute the claim.. Today, it is owned by the Nature Conservancy of Canada.
