= Simpsons Island (New Brunswick) =

Island in New Brunswick, Canada

Native name: Quak-ee-men-ee-quo'-sis Bog on the Little Island
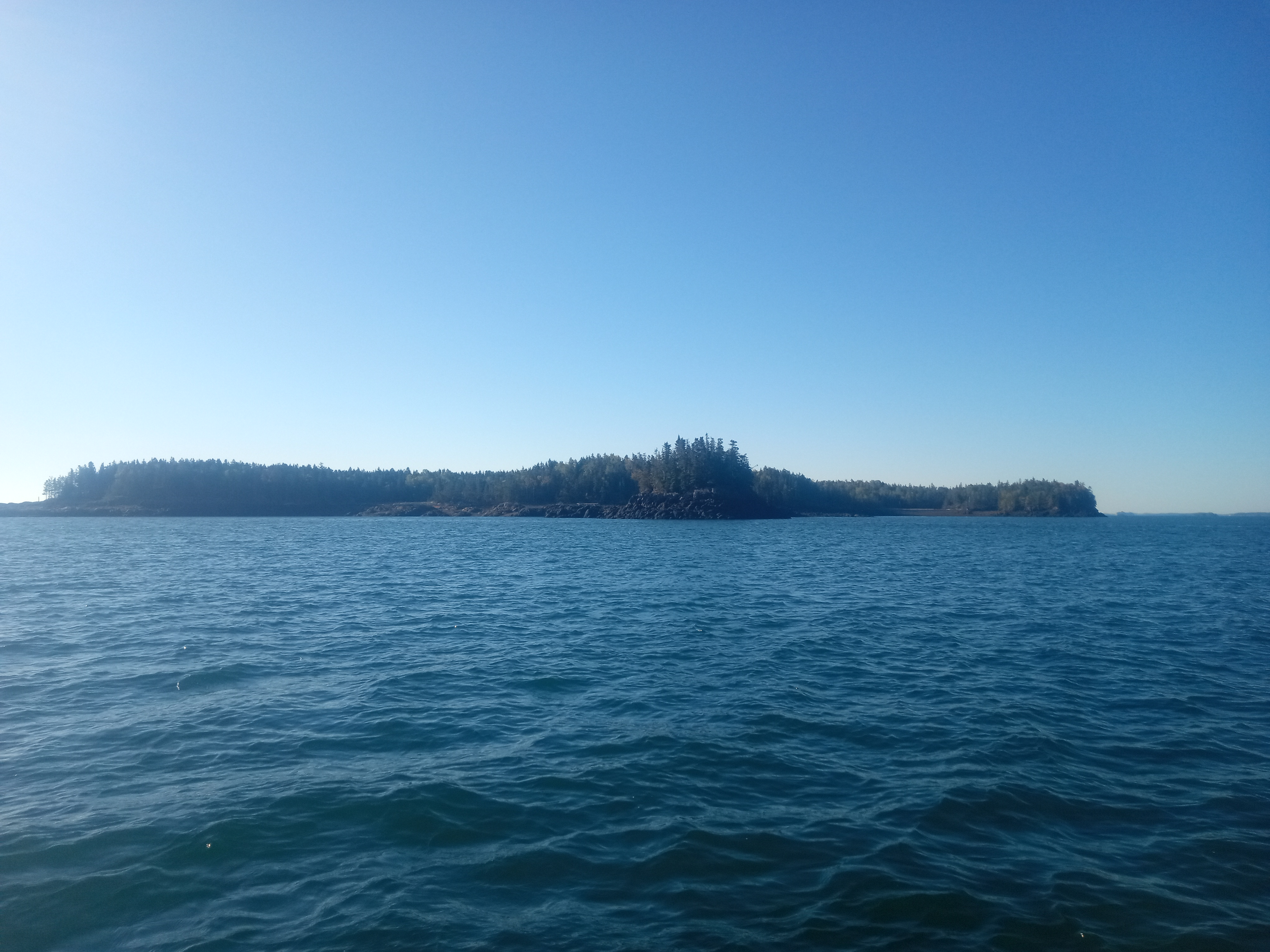
- Interactive map of Simpsons Island

Geography
- Location: Bay of Fundy
- Coordinates: 44°59′56″N 66°54′52″W
- Area: 40 acres (16 ha)

Administration
- Canada
- Province: New Brunswick
- County: Charlotte
- Parish: West Isles Parish

Simpsons Island is an undeveloped 22-hectare forested island in the West Isles Parish of Charlotte County, New Brunswick, Canada, where the Bay of Fundy enters Passamaquoddy Bay.

It is covered with spruce and fir trees and supports a white-tailed deer population. In the late 1970s it was noted to no longer host eagles, which had previously nested there. It has been the subject of subtidal graduate studies. In 1978, Mackay noted a high species abundance and diversity here, and five other nearby islands.

As Warren Hatheway was unsuccessful in his bid to be granted Bar Island off the northern shore of Deer Island against the wishes of Thomas Farrell, between 1810-1817 he was awarded a grant of six small nearby islets; Hardwood Island, Popes Island, Nubble Island, Dinner Island Simpsons Island and Fish Island.

It has copper pyrites and malachite on the shore under high water, and the copper was mined for a time at the start of the 20th century. In 1952, both Simpsons Island and nearby Adam's Island were purchased by the Anthonian Mining Corporation, with drilling starting immediately on Adam's. Both had mining efforts in the 1860s as well.

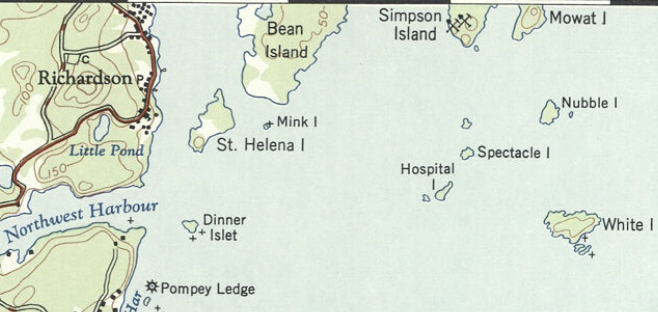
A map showing Simpson Island

In 1911, one family reported was reported to be living on the island.

In December 1985, a study by Parks Canada assessed the island's value as $24,200. A rockweed study was done on the island in 1989.

In 2005, the Nature Conservancy of Canada was raising funds to purchase Simpsons Island. In 2016, the island was one of the focuses of the Great Fundy Cleanup.

In Summer 2012, the island was one of four studied as a rockweed habitat.
