= Sandy Island (New Brunswick) =

Island in New Brunswick, Canada

- Interactive map of Sandy Island

Geography
- Location: Bay of Fundy
- Coordinates: 44°58′23″N 66°54′48″W
- Area: 8 acres (3.2 ha)

Administration
- Canada
- Province: New Brunswick
- County: Charlotte
- Parish: West Isles Parish

Sandy Island (formerly Gull Island) is an undeveloped island in the West Isles Parish of Charlotte County, New Brunswick, Canada, where the Bay of Fundy enters Passamaquoddy Bay.

It is made up of rocks resembling the normal coastal type. As of 1839, the island was one of four belonging to the Campobello Mill and Manufacturing Company. It has one of the few sandy beaches in the region, making it a popular recreational spot for visitors.

It was identified as an important nesting site for Eider ducks.

It has been the subject of subtidal graduate studies. In 1978, Mackay noted a high species abundance and diversity here, and five other nearby islands.

In 1964, Reginald Richardson was scuba-diving and discovered the wreck of an unidentified large ship with its cannonade, wine and anchor near the Sandy Island ledges off Deer Island. It was determined, based on reviewing the June 22 1798 Saint John Gazette, that the ship had been the Britannia which had been wrecked June 15 1798. The partially submerged wreck had been partially offloaded and its salvage listed for sale by John Black & Co, but during the winter scrappers plundered and burned the wreck leading to Black offering a reward for information leading to the capture of the culprits.

In 1970, Eric Allaby and Art McKay dove the wreck and mapped its coordinates - with Allaby noting "the loss of the Britannia prompts an intriguing question...just how much influence the stranding of the Britannia might have had in directing trade away from Saint Andrews and toward Saint John.".

In December 1985, a study by Parks Canada assessed the island's value as $3,600.

In the summer of 1986, benthic algae sublittoral research stations were set up across the region including on South Sandy Island.

As of 2003, a weir was maintained at the island by Raymond Young.

Author Michael Strong condemned the approval of a salmon weir at Tinkers Island given its proximity to the harbour seal colony at Sandy Island and similar seals at Casco Bay Island, which would necessitate acoustic seal deterrents disruptive to the minke whales and harbour porpoises that traversed the site.

In 2023, the Huntsman Marine Science Centre released the Dive Deeper website with detailed 3D and panoramic views diving around the Passamaquoddy Bay, including Sandy Island.
