= New Ireland =

New Ireland may refer to:

== Geography ==
- New Ireland (island), large island in the state of Papua New Guinea
- New Ireland Province, administrative division of Papua New Guinea
- New Ireland (New Brunswick), island in Canada

== Politics ==
- United Ireland, the proposed unification of the island of Ireland as a sovereign state
- New Ireland Forum, reported in 1984 with recommendations for ending the Troubles
- Éire Nua, an Irish republican political agenda

== History ==
- New Ireland (Maine), an abortive 18th-century British Colony in modern-day Maine and New Brunswick
- New Ireland, a proposed renaming of Prince Edward Island, led by then lieutenant-governor Walter Patterson in 1770
- New Ireland, a short-lived territory proclaimed by the Castle Hill convict rebellion in Australia
- New Ireland, a proposed renaming of Canada in the Fenian Manifesto should the Fenians manage to capture Montreal, which was the capital of Canada until 1849.

== Business ==
- New Ireland Assurance, part of the Bank of Ireland Group
