= Little Island (New Brunswick) =

Island in New Brunswick, Canada

- Interactive map of Little Island

Geography
- Location: Bay of Fundy
- Coordinates: 45°1′0″N 66°55′0″W

Administration
- Canada
- Province: New Brunswick
- County: Charlotte
- Parish: West Isles Parish

Little Island (formerly Graveyard Island and Steward Island) is an undeveloped island in the West Isles Parish of Charlotte County, New Brunswick, Canada, where the Bay of Fundy enters Passamaquoddy Bay.

The island is only 150 metres off Deer Island.

Archaic and Late Maritime Archaic artifacts have been found on Little Island.

There is a geodetic triangulation station on the highest point of the island.

There is a historic cemetery on the island.

On Oct 31 1938, Blanchard Lambert drowned when his boat capsized off Pendleton Island, and his body was recovered on Little Island.
