= Dinner Island (New Brunswick) =

Island in New Brunswick, Canada

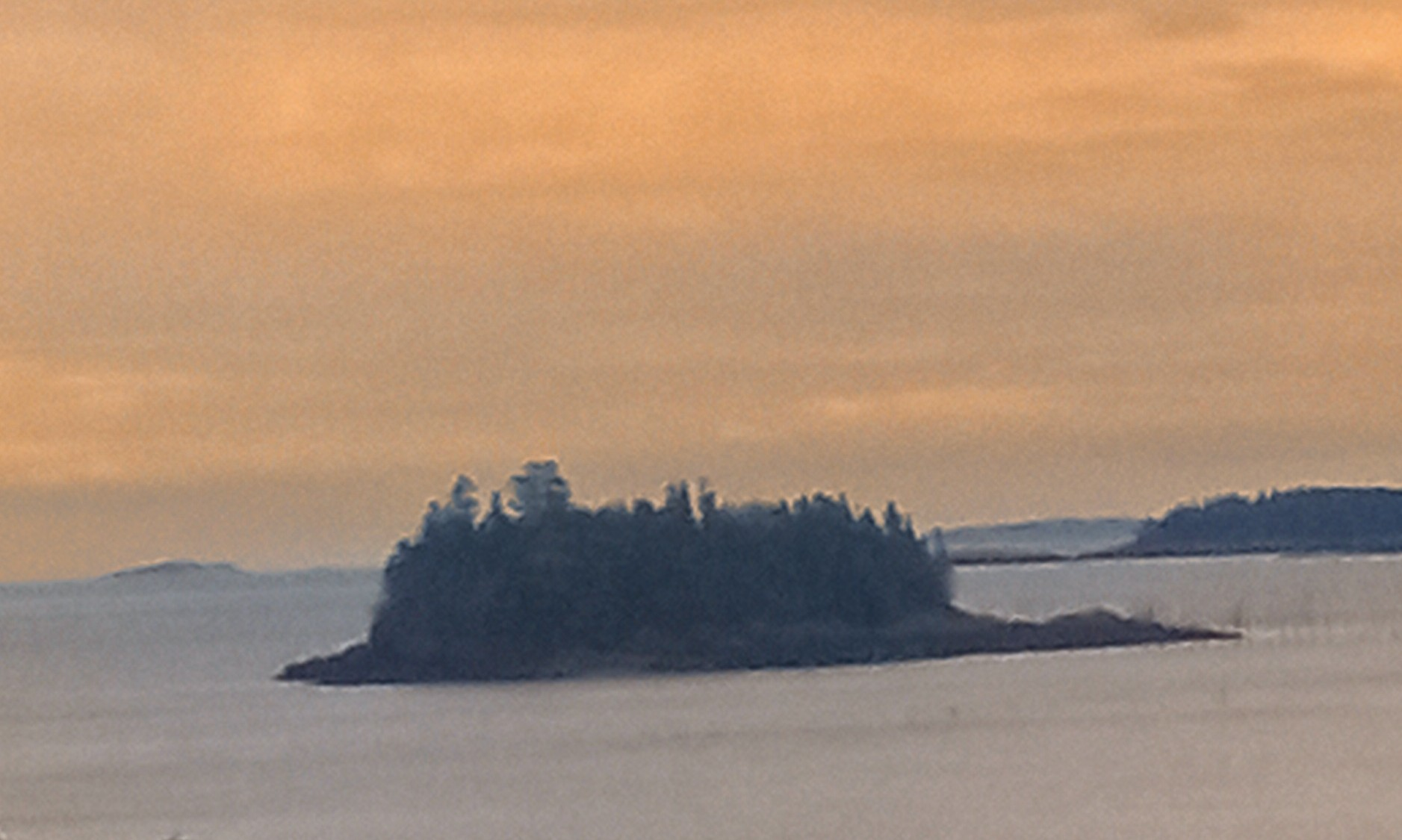
- Interactive map of Dinner Island

Geography
- Location: Bay of Fundy
- Coordinates: 44°59′0″N 66°56′35″W

Administration
- Canada
- Province: New Brunswick
- County: Charlotte
- Parish: West Isles Parish

Dinner Island is an undeveloped island in the West Isles Parish of Charlotte County, New Brunswick, Canada, where the Bay of Fundy enters Passamaquoddy Bay.

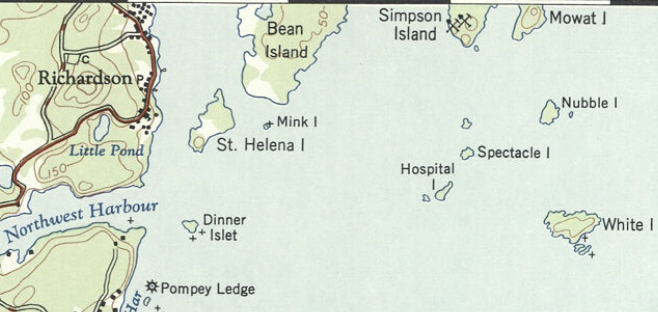
A map showing Dinner Island

In 1910, a nautical beacon was placed at Pompey's Ledge, between Deer Island and Dinner Island to mark the northwest passage to the harbour.

As Warren Hatheway was unsuccessful in his bid to be granted Bar Island off the northern shore of Deer Island against the wishes of Thomas Farrell, between 1810-1817 he was awarded a grant of six small nearby islets including Hardwood Island, Popes Island, Nubble Island, Dinner Island Simpsons Island and Fish Island.

In 2017, a Great White Shark was videoed killing a porpoise off Dinner Island.
