= Nub Island =

Island in New Brunswick, Canada

- Interactive map of Nub Island

Geography
- Location: Bay of Fundy
- Coordinates: 45°2′32″N 66°54′43″W

Administration
- Canada
- Province: New Brunswick
- County: Charlotte
- Parish: West Isles Parish

Nub Island is an undeveloped island in the West Isles Parish of Charlotte County, New Brunswick, Canada, where the Bay of Fundy enters Passamaquoddy Bay.
