= St. Helena Island (New Brunswick) =

Island in New Brunswick, Canada

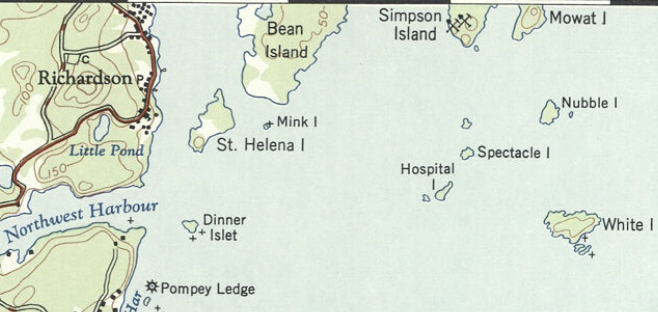
- Interactive map of St. Helena Island

Geography
- Location: Bay of Fundy
- Coordinates: 44°59′28″N 66°56′27″W
- Area: 25 acres (10 ha)

Administration
- Canada
- Province: New Brunswick
- County: Charlotte
- Parish: West Isles Parish

St. Helena Island is an undeveloped island in the West Isles Parish of Charlotte County, New Brunswick, Canada, where the Bay of Fundy enters Passamaquoddy Bay. It consists of shingle beach of rock fragments.

In July 1896, the Court of Foresters held a picnic on St. Helena Island.

The rockweed on the island is harvested.

There is a geodetic triangulation station on a bare ledge southwest of the highest point.

It was one of four islands studied in 1997 for the impact of sea kayaking on the Bay of Fundy environment.
