= Adam Island (New Brunswick) =

Island in New Brunswick, Canada

Native name: Amog’enesk’ Fishing Place
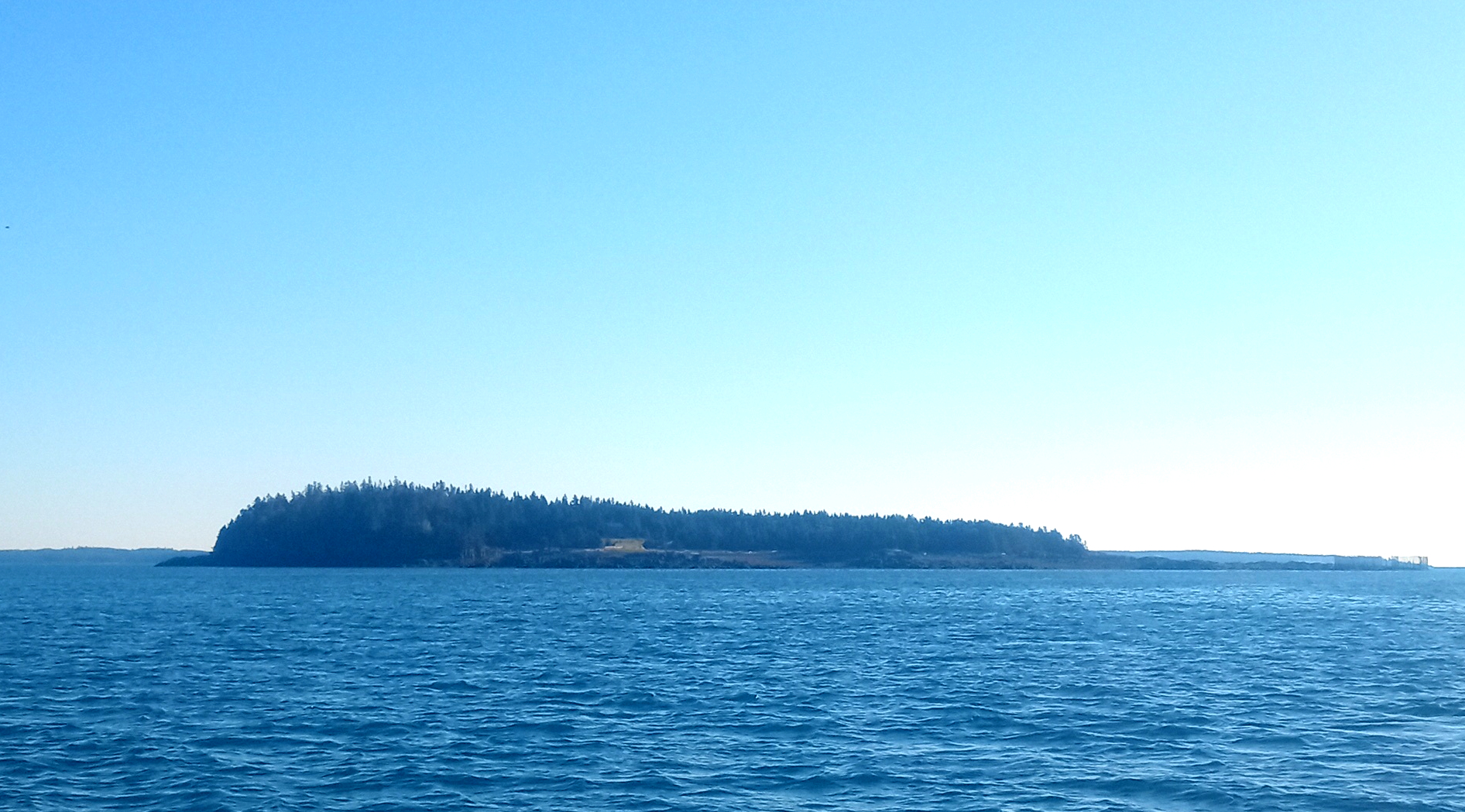
- Interactive map of Adam Island

Geography
- Location: Bay of Fundy
- Coordinates: 45°0′48.45″N 66°54′11.09″W
- Area: 50 acres (20 ha)

Administration
- Canada
- Province: New Brunswick
- County: Charlotte
- Parish: West Isles Parish

Adam Island is an island in the West Isles Parish of Charlotte County, New Brunswick, Canada, where the Bay of Fundy enters Passamaquoddy Bay. Chaffey's Point is on the north end of the island.

It has been the subject of subtidal graduate studies. In 1978, Mackay noted a high species abundance and diversity here, and five other nearby islands.

== History ==
John Adams, the Connecticut Loyalist, left from New York in the Fall Fleet of 1783 to Adams Island, New Brunswick where he was mentioned living in an1818 deed. In 1849, his grandson Daniel Adams built the 7-ton schooner Plover on Adams Island, which was still in commercial service in 1873.

The north end of the island was titled Chatty's Point, and it was owned by David and John Mowat who also owned Mowat's Island.

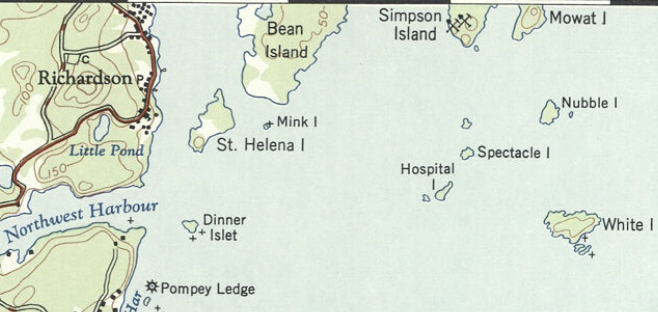
A map showing Adams Island

In 1916, a bell buoy was added to the island.

In August 1928, the murdered body of 60-year old Linwood Lord was discovered in ten feet of water off the shore of Adams Island, where he lived.

In December 1985, a study by Parks Canada assessed the island's value as $30,300.

In the summer of 1986, benthic algae sublittoral research stations were set up across the region including on Adams Island.

In Summer 2012, the island was one of four studied as a rockweed habitat as it is commercially harvested here by locals.

== Mining ==
Adam Island is mineral-rich with copper ores, with bornite and copper glance.

In 1952, both Adam's Island and nearby Simpson Island were purchased by the Anthonian Mining Corporation, with drilling starting immediately on Adam's. Both had mining efforts in the 1860s as well. There was a copper mine operated by the British company "The Casco Bay Mining Company". In 1964, two century-old inland mine shafts on Adams Island were re-opened by the Newcastle Mining Co, but the third mine shaft near the coast extending under the ocean was flooded and unable to re-open.
