= Nubble Island =

Island in New Brunswick, Canada

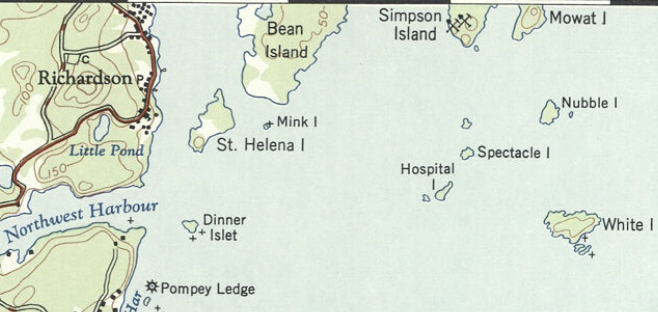
- Interactive map of Nubble Island

Geography
- Location: Bay of Fundy
- Coordinates: 44°59′33″N 66°54′22″W
- Highest elevation: 29 m (95 ft)

Administration
- Canada
- Province: New Brunswick
- County: Charlotte
- Parish: West Isles Parish

Nubble Island is an undeveloped island in the West Isles Parish of Charlotte County, New Brunswick, Canada, where the Bay of Fundy enters Passamaquoddy Bay.

As Warren Hatheway was unsuccessful in his bid to be granted Bar Island off the northern shore of Deer Island against the wishes of Thomas Farrell, between 1810-1817 he was awarded a grant of six small nearby islets including Hardwood Island, Popes Island, Nubble Island, Dinner Island Simpsons Island and Fish Island.

Although it is privately owned, it includes an easement for the Nature Trust of New Brunswick. It is under the protection of the Nature Conservancy of Canada.
