= Pendleton Island =

Island in New Brunswick, Canada

Native name: Um-kub-ahumk' A Bar, Nearly Covered
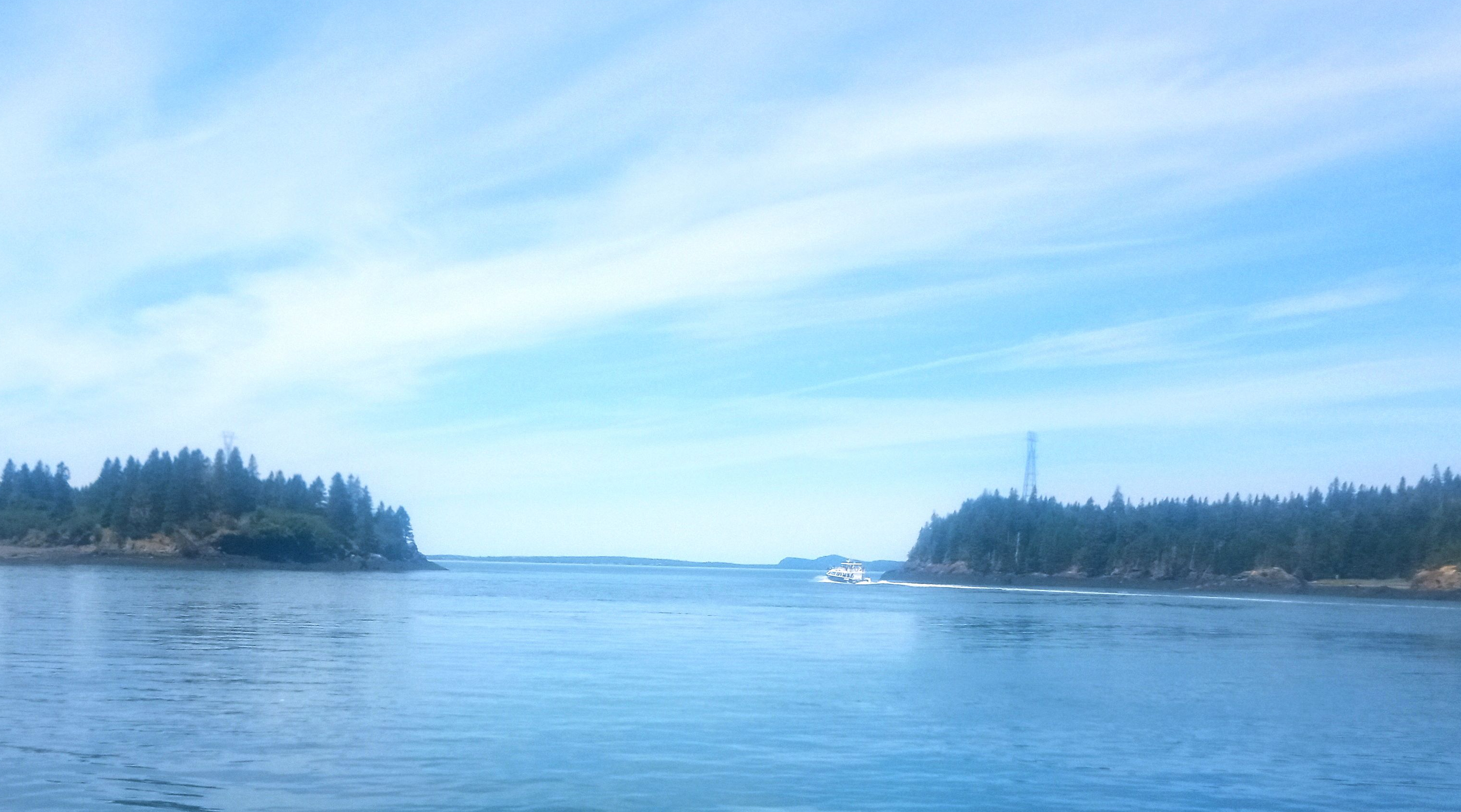
- A whale watching ship takes passengers through Doyle's Passage between Pendleton Island (left), and Macs Island (right) witih New Ireland in the foreground.
- Interactive map of Pendleton Island

Geography
- Location: Bay of Fundy
- Coordinates: 45°1′53″N 66°57′4″W
- Archipelago: Deer Island Archipelago
- Area: 120 ha (300 acres)
- Highest elevation: 77 m (253 ft)

Administration
- Canada
- Province: New Brunswick
- County: Charlotte
- Parish: West Isles Parish

Pendleton Island (formerly called Doyle's Island) is an undeveloped island in the West Isles Parish of Charlotte County, New Brunswick, Canada, where the Bay of Fundy enters Passamaquoddy Bay.

Doyle's Passage (alternately called Boyle's Passage) initially referred to the narrow northern passage between the island and Macs Island which was then termed Letete Island, but the term later came to refer to the narrow passage between Pendleton's Island and Deer Island, with the northern passage renamed L'etete Passage. Two overhead power cables over the passage have clearances of 15 and 21 metres. The passage between Pendleton and Deer island is shallow and marked with rocks, making it difficult to cross.

Historically only occupied by the Pendleton family, it was noted "the inhabitants...have always been part-farmer, part-fisherman". Although sparsely visited today, it used to host regular weekend excursions from Deer Islanders.

== Geography ==
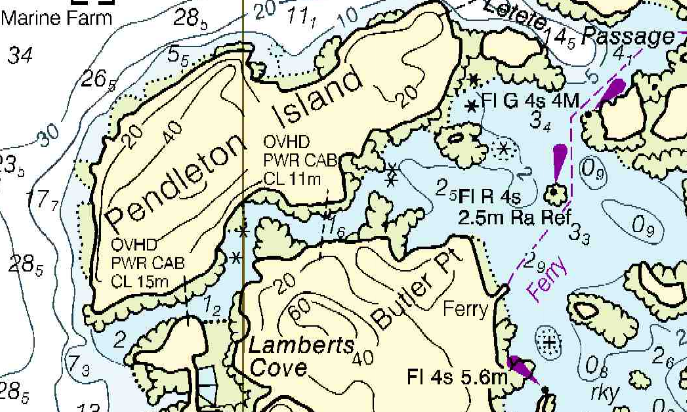
Pendleton Island

The island has a mixture of spruce, birch, mountain ash and red maple, balsam fir and tamarack trees. A rockweed study was done on the island in 1989.

The island has a 500 foot (150 m) cliff that historically drew thrillseekers to attempt to climb. The island contains a lagoon, and its chief bay has a steep gravel barrier beach.

The northern side of the island is silurian rock.

== History ==
It was named for three Loyalist brothers Stephen, Thomas and Gideon Pendleton who settled the island. A 1796 deed shows Thomas Pendleton purchased "Hardwood Island" from Thomas Doyle for £150, which is presumed to reference Pendleton's Island rather than the currently-named Hardwood Island a few kilometres away.

The island was described by Thomas Baillie in 1832 as "a narrow island...between which and Deer Island there is a narrow passage for boats...this island is settled, its soil good, the situation unobjectionable and its aspect favourable to agriculture.".

There is a geodetic triangulation station on a high bare hill on the northwestern part of the island.

There is a historic cemetery on the island, which contains the graves of Herb Pendleton who died in 1903, Lyda Warring, and Stephen Pendleton veteran of the War of 1812.

In July 1877, an International Temperance Convention was held on Pendleton Island.

In November 1893, Luther Lambert of Lord's Cove married Millie Pendleton at the home of her father, Ward Pendleton, on the island. Ward Pendleton had nine children, and his homestead later fell into disrepair by the 1910s, having been stripped of its doors and windows, while the outbuildings survived and were still used to house sheep and keep farm equipment for decades afterward.

From at least 1910-1916, Calvin Pendleton and his wife Theresa Holland lived on the family including with their daughter Arlene.

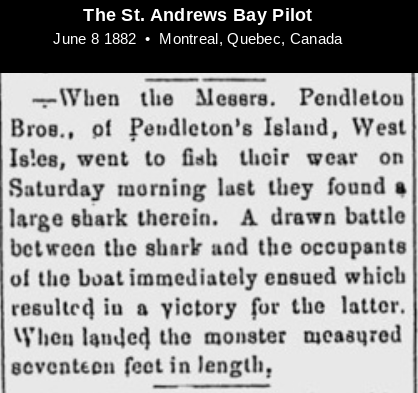
An 1882 article on a shark being found in a Pendleton Island weir

On Oct 31 1938, Blanchard Lambert drowned when his boat capsized off Pendleton's Island, and his body was recovered on Little Island. Calvin and his family lived in an older house at the lower end of the big field that had been built circa 1884, until a chimney fire destroyed it in February 1919. By the early 1930s, the remaining outbuildings and barn on Calvin's property were deliberately burned in a spat of arson that also destroyed weirman's camps and unoccupied buildings, tentatively connected to a group living on a nearby island.

As of the 1910s, Passamaquoddy natives would visit Pendleton Island over the summer camping at Western Point while collecting sweetgrass and reeds.

In 1938, Raymond Greenlaw was hired to work on the power lines from McMaster Island to Pendleton Island to Deer Island, and he spent the next four decades largely operating as Deer Island's only representative of NB Power. He recounted the time a power line had gone down on Pendleton Island falling on three grazing cows "cooking them on the spot".

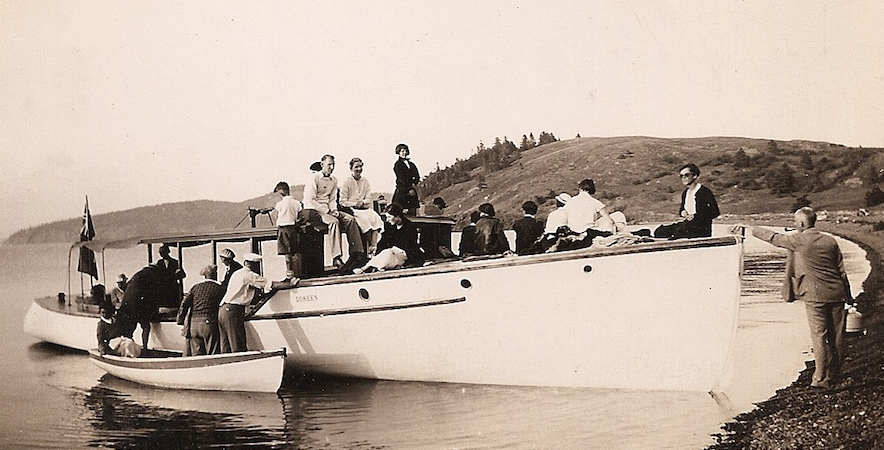
A boat disembarking on Pendleton's Island

The Pendleton family continued living on the island, across two homesteads raising crops and cattle until approximately 1935 when ownership was split between nearly 150 descendents of the deceased Ward Pendleton. The Nature Conservancy of Canada located 114 of the descendants who agreed to sign over their share of the island, as did Dr. Herb Mitton, leading to its establishment as a nature sanctuary and one of the Conservancy's largest properties.

In September 1947, two Eastport pilots Frank Bradish and Morton Berman swam to safety after their plane hit the power lines on Pendleton Island.

A 1985 study confirmed the presence of an unnamed shipwreck in the northern cove of the island.

== See also ==
- List of islands of New Brunswick
