= Casco Bay Island =

Private island in New Brunswick, Canada

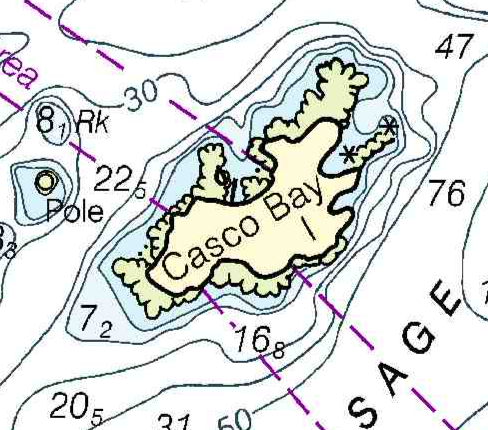
- NOAA chart of Casco Bay Island
- Interactive map of Casco Bay Island

Geography
- Location: Bay of Fundy
- Coordinates: 44°57′20″N 66°55′55″W
- Area: 37 acres (15 ha)
- Highest elevation: 26 m (85 ft)

Administration
- Canada
- Province: New Brunswick
- County: Charlotte

Casco Bay Island (formerly Case's Bay Island or Casco Island (Note: The name was officially changed in 1970.)) is a private island located in Passamaquoddy Bay, between Campobello Island and Deer Island, in New Brunswick, Canada. The island is approximately 41 acres in size at the mean high tide line. Found at 44°57'20" North and 66°55'55" West.

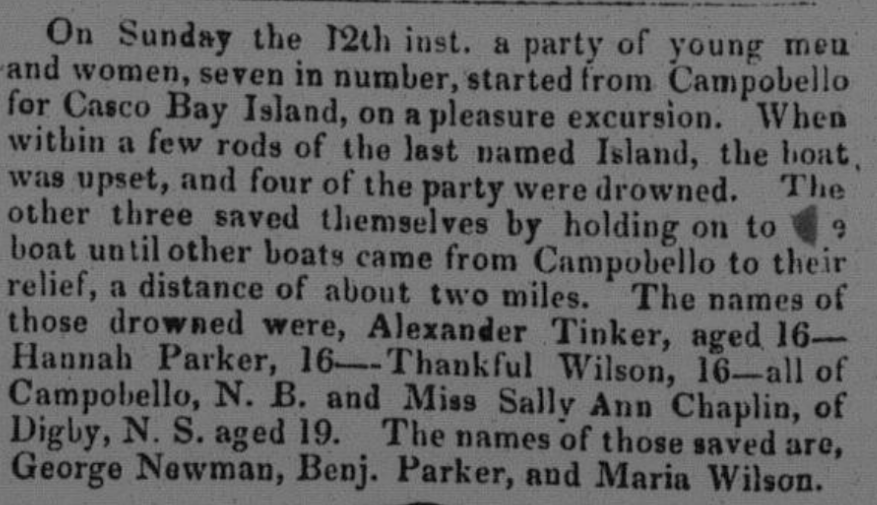
In July 1835, four youths drowned trying to reach Casco Bay Island.

W. F. Ganong noted that the "Green Island" referenced in Mitchell's 1764 Ms. Field Book appears not to have referred to the modern Green Island, but was likely a reference to Casco Bay Island given its described coordinates. They were further tied together by the 1870 Geological Survey. Although Baillie's 1832 "Account of the Province of New Brunswick" considered them separate.

In 1771, Casco Bay Island was claimed by William Owen alongside Campobello and Sandy Island. In April 1786, Charles Morris, of Halifax, claimed to have purchased at a Sheriff's Sale the entirety of Casco Bay Island, Head Harbour Island and some thousands of acres on Campobello, and sold the same lands to Gillam Butler who later sold them for £2500 to his colleague Thomas Storrow who worked with him at John Fraser & Co Merchants, but later bought it back for £2000. Lady Owen, gifted Casco Bay Island to Chief Justice John Campbell Allen.

As of 1839, the island was one of four belonging to the Campobello Mill and Manufacturing Company. It was one of five islands dismissed by author Abraham Gesner in 1847 as "small eminences of little importance".

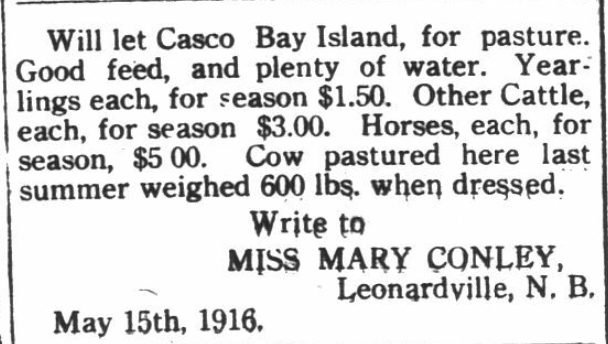
A 1916 effort to rent out the island for pasture.

It is steep on its eastern side, and ledges run 300m off its northern and southwestern edges.

In 1875, a fishing weir was licensed off the island to Wellington Clyne.

In August 1895, William Conley, Jr. and Elmer Richardson constructed a herring weir at Casco Bay Island.

In 1909, a sailor estimated to be in his thirties came to the Bay of Fundy with a schooner and crew of 15 men feigning interest in lobster fishing but drawing the attention of authorities who noted its lack of activity and cargo. When a rowboat was launched to Casco Island with men bearing shovels and mattocks, Customs officials followed it from a distance believing they intended to dispose of a corpse or dig up illicit goods to smuggle, unaware the schooner had sent ashore a geologist, mining engineer and civil engineer as part of a scientific expedition out of Galveston, Texas seeking the treasure of privateer Jean Lafitte.

Lithic artifacts have been recovered from Casco Bay Island's marsh on the north end, lying between two bedrock-core tree-covered knolls.

It was one of four islands studied in 1997 for the impact of sea kayaking on the Bay of Fundy environment. It has been the subject of subtidal graduate studies.

From 2005–2013, the island was listed for sale ($1.4 million in summer 2013).

Author Michael Strong condemned the approval of a salmon weir at Tinkers Island given its proximity to the harbour seal colony at Sandy Island and similar seals at Casco Bay Island, which would necessitate acoustic seal deterrents disruptive to the minke whales and harbour porpoises that traversed the site.

The NB Power submarine power cable between Campobello Island and Leonardville, New Brunswick relays at Casco Bay Island.
