= Mowat Island =

Island in New Brunswick, Canada

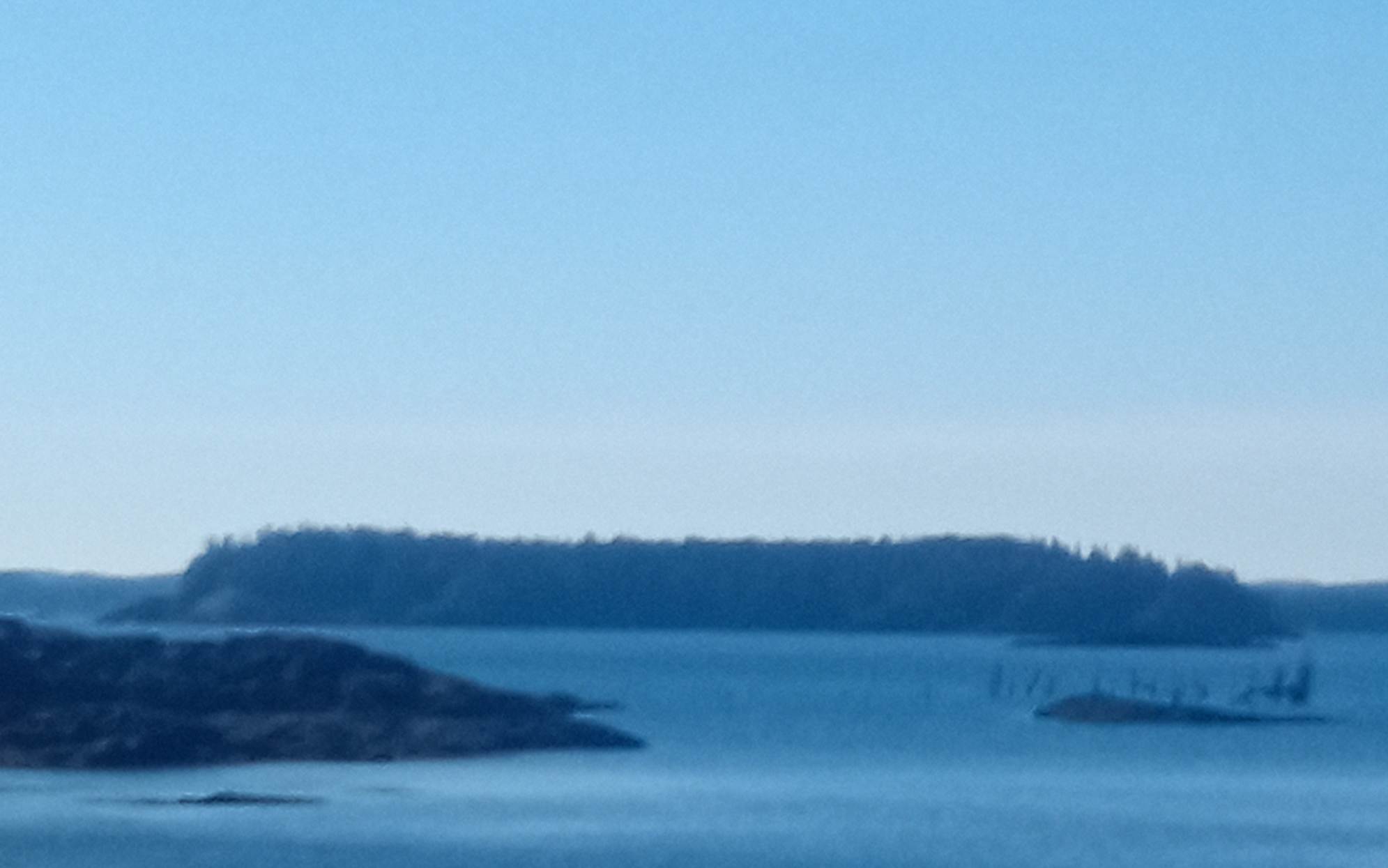
- Mowat Island (seen in background)
- Interactive map of Mowat Island

Geography
- Location: Bay of Fundy
- Coordinates: 44°59′57″N 66°54′28″W
- Area: 5 ha (12 acres)

Administration
- Canada
- Province: New Brunswick
- County: Charlotte
- Parish: West Isles Parish

Mowat Island (also called Moat Island) is an undeveloped island in the West Isles Parish of Charlotte County, New Brunswick, Canada, where the Bay of Fundy enters Passamaquoddy Bay. It was historically owned by John and David Mowat, who also owned Adams Island.

In August 1854, Captain Samuel Simpson, former pilot of HMS Plumper, died on Mowat's Island.

On September 29 1932, the RCMP intercepted Harry Richardson's Ada May at the uninhabited Mowat Island selling smuggled alcohol.

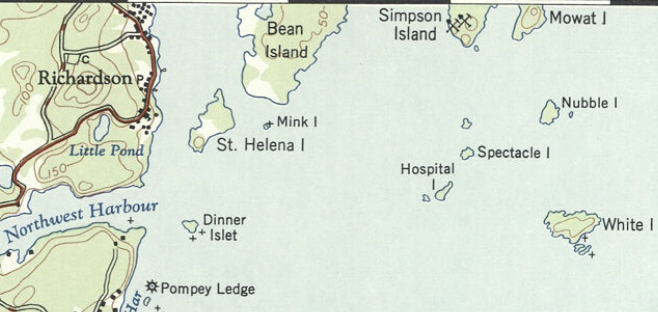
Map showing Mowat Island

Although Mowat Island is privately owned, it has an easement for the Nature Trust of New Brunswick which entirely owns Little Mowat Island to its north. It is under the protection of the Nature Conservancy of Canada.

There is a geodetic triangulation station on a high rocky hill in the middle of the island. A rockweed study was done on the island in 1989. It has been the subject of subtidal graduate studies.
