= Tetraphlorethol C =

Names
- Preferred IUPAC name 2,4,6-Trioxa-1,7(1),3,5(1,4)-tetrabenzenaheptaphane-1^{2},1^{4},1^{6},3^{3},3^{5},5^{3},5^{5},7^{3},7^{5}-nonol
- Other names 2-[4-[4-(3,5-dihydroxyphenoxy)-3,5-dihydroxyphenoxy]-3,5-dihydroxyphenoxy]benzene-1,3,5-triol

Identifiers
3D model (JSmol)	Interactive image
ChemSpider	129556847
PubChem CID	71308282
CompTox Dashboard (EPA)	DTXSID901030421
- InChI: InChI=1S/C24H18O12/c25-10-1-11(26)3-13(2-10)34-23-18(30)8-15(9-19(23)31)36-24-20(32)6-14(7-21(24)33)35-22-16(28)4-12(27)5-17(22)29/h1-9,25-33H Key: YOFARVUPGKULPN-UHFFFAOYSA-N
- SMILES: c4c(O)cc(O)cc4Oc1c(O)cc(cc1O)Oc3c(O)cc(cc3O)Oc2c(O)cc(O)cc2O

Properties
Chemical formula	C_{24}H_{18}O_{12}
Molar mass	498.396 g·mol^{−1}
- Except where otherwise noted, data are given for materials in their standard state (at 25 °C [77 °F], 100 kPa). Infobox references

Tetraphlorethol C is a phlorethol-type phlorotannin found in the brown alga Ascophyllum nodosum. Chemically, it is a tetramer of 1,2,3,5-tetrahydroxybenzene.
