= Tinkers Island (New Brunswick) =

Island in New Brunswick, Canada

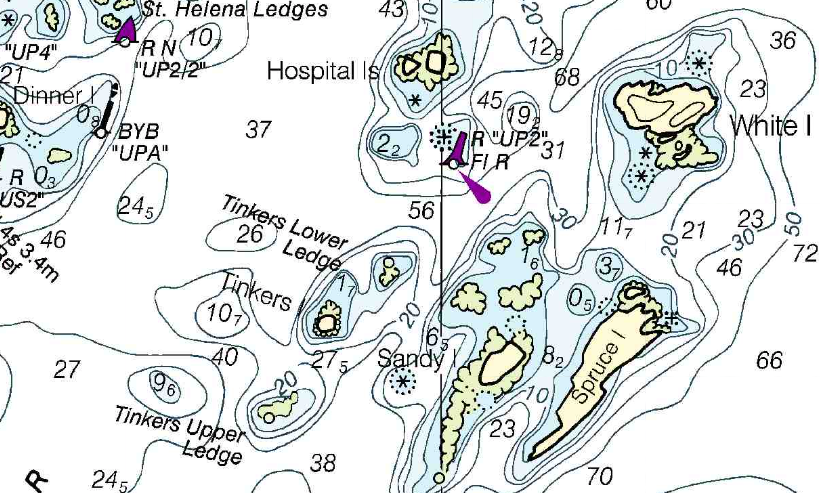
- Interactive map of Tinkers Island

Geography
- Location: Bay of Fundy
- Coordinates: 44°58′29″N 66°55′24″W

Administration
- Canada
- Province: New Brunswick
- County: Charlotte
- Parish: West Isles Parish

Tinkers Island is an undeveloped island in the West Isles Parish of Charlotte County, New Brunswick, Canada, where the Bay of Fundy enters Passamaquoddy Bay.

In 2003 it was noted as a Cormorant nesting site, and also has gulls and eider ducks. In 1978, Mackay noted a high species abundance and diversity here, and five other nearby islands.

Tinker Shoal has a green light-and-bell buoy marked XK3.

Author Michael Strong condemned the approval of a salmon weir at Tinker island given its proximity to the harbour seal colony at Sandy Island and similar seals at Casco Bay Island, which would necessitate acoustic seal deterrents disruptive to the minke whales and harbour porpoises that traversed the site.
