= West Isles Parish =

Coordinates: 44.981799°N 66.944504°W

West Isles Deer Island
- Parish
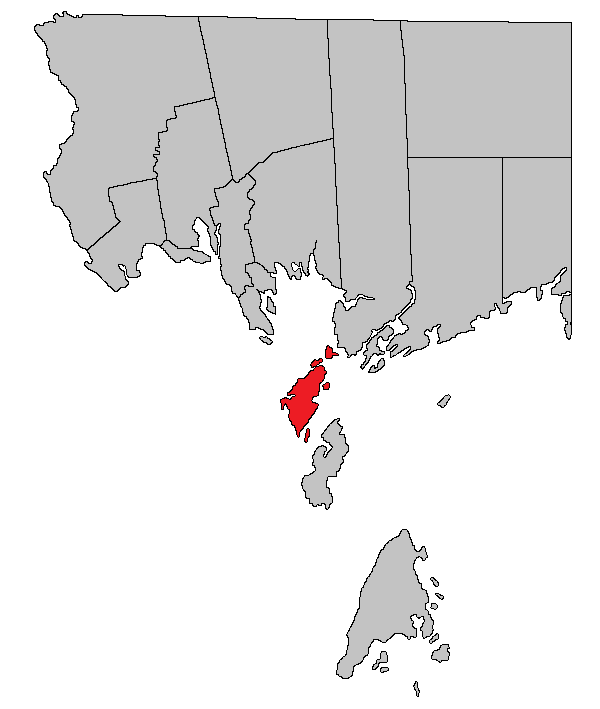
- Location within Charlotte County.
- Country: Canada
- Province: New Brunswick
- County: Charlotte County
- Erected: 1786

Area
  - Land: 38.32 km^{2} (14.80 sq mi)

Population (2021)
  - Total: 718
  - Density: 18.7/km^{2} (48/sq mi)
  - Change 2016-2021: ▼9.9%
  - Dwellings: 475
- Time zone: UTC-4 (AST)
  - Summer (DST): UTC-3 (ADT)

West Isles is a geographic parish in Charlotte County, New Brunswick, Canada. (Note: The Territorial Division Act divides the province into 152 parishes, the cities of Saint John and Fredericton, and one town of Grand Falls. The Interpretation Act clarifies that parishes include any local government within their borders.)

For governance purposes, it is part of the Southwest rural district, which is a member of the Southwest New Brunswick Service Commission.

Prior to the 2023 governance reform, it comprised a single local service district (LSD), which was a member of the Southwest New Brunswick Service Commission (SNBSC).

The parish comprises dozens of offshore islands but only the largest, Deer Island, is inhabited. There are no bridges and only Deer Island has ferry service.

Historian William Francis Ganong considered the name to come from the islands' position.

== History ==
West Isles was erected in 1786 as one of the original parishes of the county, including Deer Island, Campobello, and Grand Manan, and islands in Cobscook Bay.

In 1822, eight Justices of the Peace in Charlotte County brought complaint about "conduct derogatory to the character of Magistrates" against two West Isles justices, Warren Hatheway and Gilbert Ruggles.

== Boundaries ==
West Isles Parish is bounded:

- on the northeast by the Letete Passage and the Bay of Fundy;
- on the east by the Bay of Fundy;
- on the southeast by Head Harbour Passage;
- on the southwest and west by the international border, running through the Western Passage and Passamaquoddy Bay.

=== Evolution of boundaries ===
West Isles was originally defined "to contain Deer Island, Campo Bello Island, Grand Manan Island, Moose Island, Frederick Island and Dudley Island, with all the lesser islands contiguous to them, not included in the towns before-mentioned", (Note: Use of long s modernised for readability.) a description that included any islands more than 2 miles (3.2 km) offshore except The Wolves in Pennfield Parish.

In 1803 Campobello was erected as its own parish, including nearby minor islands; Campobello inherited West Isles' claims to Cobscook Bay.

In 1816 Grand Manan and was erected as its own parish, including nearby minor islands.

In 1877 the parish's boundary were clarified: Campobello Parish's boundary running through Head Harbour Passage, Saint George Parish's through Letete Passage rather than two miles from the mainland, transferring several islands from Saint George to West Isles.

== Local service district ==
The local service district of the parish of West Isles comprised the entire parish.

The LSD was established in 1970 to assess for fire protection. First aid and ambulance services were added in 1982, recreational facilities in 1987.

In 2022, the LSD assessed community & recreation services as well as the basic LSD services of fire protection, police services, land use planning, emergency measures, and dog control. The taxing authority is 517.00 West Isles.

== Communities ==
Communities at least partly within the parish. italics indicate a name no longer in official use

- Chocolate Cove
- Cummings Cove
- Fairhaven
- Hersonville
- Lamberts Cove
- Lambertville
- Leonardville
- Lords Cove
- Northern Harbour (North Harbour)
- Richardson
- Stuart Town

== Bodies of water ==
Bodies of water (Note: Not including brooks, ponds or coves.) at least partly within the parish. italics indicate a name no longer in official use

- Deans Creek (Note: A small bay.)
- Mill Creek
- Welch Creek
- Bay of Fundy
- Passamaquoddy Bay
- Fish Harbour
- Leonardville Harbour
- Northern Harbour (North Harbour)
- Northwest Harbour
- Ship Harbour
- Leonards Lake
- Doyles Passage (False Passage, Pendleton Passage)
- Faux Passage
- Head Harbour Passage
- Indian River (Note: A tidal flow between islands.)
- Irish Channel
- Letete Passage
- Little Letete Passage
- Quoddy River
- The Notch
- Western Passage

== Islands ==
Islands at least partly within the parish. italics indicate a name no longer in official use

- Adam's Island (New Brunswick)
- Bar Island
- Barnes Island
- Beans Island
- Casco Bay Island
- Cherry Island
- Crow Island
- Deer Island
- Dinner Island (New Brunswick)
- English Island (New Brunswick)
- Fish Island (New Brunswick)
- Green Island (New Brunswick)
- Hardwood Island
- Hospital Island (Also called Little Hardwood Island, Quarantine Island)
- Indian Island
- Jameson Island
- Little Island
- Macs Island (McMaster Island)
- Marble Island (Rouen Islet)
- Mink Island
- Mohawk Island
- Mowat Island
- New Ireland Island (New Brunswick)
- Nub Island
- Nubble Island
- Parker Island
- Partridge Island
- Pendleton Island
- Pope's Folly Island, historically disputed ownership between Canada/USA
- St. Helena Island
- Sandy Island
- Simpson Island (New Brunswick)
- Spectacle Islands (Spectacle Island, The Specs)
- Spruce Island, red conglomerate rock As of 1839, the island was one of four belonging to the Campobello Mill and Manufacturing Company.
- The Pup
- Thumb Cap Island (Thrumcap Island), coarse brown/red conglomerate
- Tinkers Island
- White Horse Island
- White Island

== Other notable places ==
Parks, historic sites, and other noteworthy places at least partly within the parish.

- The Old Sow
- Whitehorse Island Protected Natural Area (Note: White Horse Island. This difference in spelling is not unique.)

== Demographics ==
=== Population ===
Canada census – West Isles Parish community profile

	2016	2011
Population	797 (+9.0% from 2011)	731 (-11.3% from 2006)
Land area	38.35 km^{2} (14.81 sq mi)	38.01 km^{2} (14.68 sq mi)
Population density	20.8/km^{2} (54/sq mi)	19.2/km^{2} (50/sq mi)
Median age	48.4 (M: 49.0, F: 46.8)	47.5 (M: 46.5, F: 48.4)
Private dwellings	467 (total)	485 (total)
Median household income	$56,736	$.N/A

Notes: 2011 income data for this area has been suppressed for data quality or confidentiality reasons.
References: 2016 2011

Historical Census Data - West Isles Parish, New Brunswick

Year	Pop.	±%
1991	826	—
1996	851	+3.0%
2001	851	+0.0%

Year	Pop.	±%
2006	824	−3.2%
2011	731	−11.3%
2016	797	+9.0%

Year	Pop.	±%
2021	718	−9.9%

=== Language ===
Canada Census Mother Tongue - West Isles Parish, New Brunswick
Census	Total	English			French			English & French			Other		
Year	Responses	Count	Trend	Pop %	Count	Trend	Pop %	Count	Trend	Pop %	Count	Trend	Pop %
2011	730	710	▼13.4%	97.26%	15	▲ n/a%	2.05%	5	▲ n/a%	0.69%	0	0.0%	0.00%
2006	820	820	▼1.2%	100.00%	0	▼100.0%	0.00%	0	0.0%	0.00%	0	▼100.0%	0.00%
2001	850	830	▼2.4%	97.65%	10	▲ n/a%	1.18%	0	0.0%	0.00%	10	▲ n/a%	1.18%
1996	850	850	n/a	100.00%	0	n/a	0.00%	0	n/a	0.00%	0	n/a	0.00%

== Access Routes ==
Highways and numbered routes that run through the parish, including external routes that start or finish at the parish limits:

- Highways
  - None
- Principal Routes
  - None
- Secondary Routes:
  - Route 772
- External Routes:
  - Letete to Deer Island Ferry
  - Cummings Cove to Eastport Ferry
  - Cummings Cove to Welshpool Ferry

== See also ==
- List of parishes in New Brunswick
