= Fish Island (New Brunswick) =

Island in New Brunswick, Canada

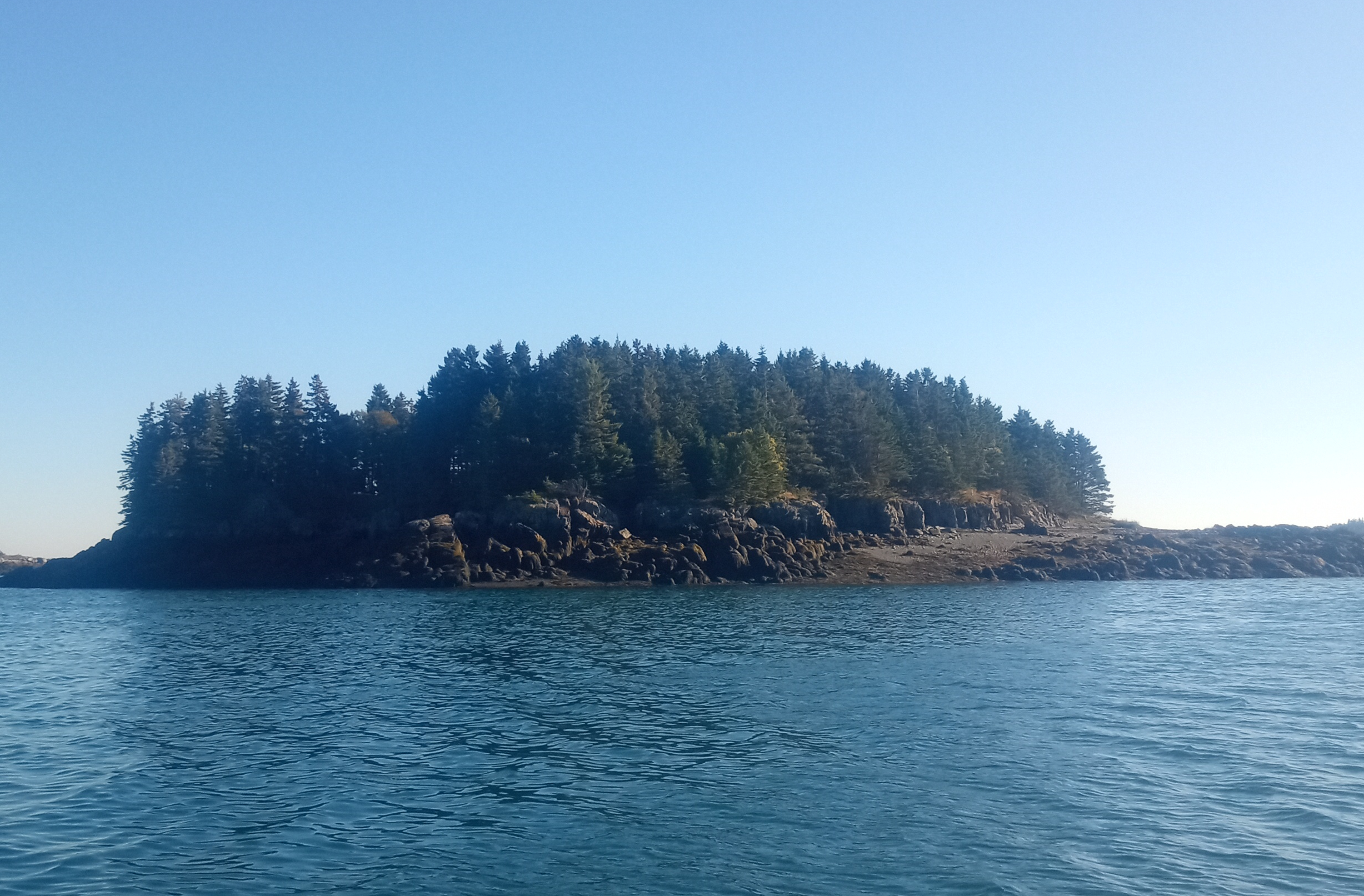
- Interactive map of Fish Island

Geography
- Location: Bay of Fundy
- Coordinates: 45°00′37″N 66°55′34″W

Administration
- Canada
- Province: New Brunswick
- County: Charlotte
- Parish: West Isles Parish

Fish Island is an undeveloped island in the West Isles Parish of Charlotte County, New Brunswick, Canada, where the Bay of Fundy enters Passamaquoddy Bay.

As Warren Hatheway was unsuccessful in his bid to be granted Bar Island off the northern shore of Deer Island against the wishes of Thomas Farrell, between 1810 and 1817 he was awarded a grant of six small nearby islets: Hardwood Island, Popes Island, Nubble Island, Dinner Island Simpsons Island and Fish Island.

Kelly Cove Salmon maintains an aquaculture facility off the island.

There is a geodetic triangulation station on a small hill.
