= White Island (New Brunswick) =

Island in New Brunswick, Canada

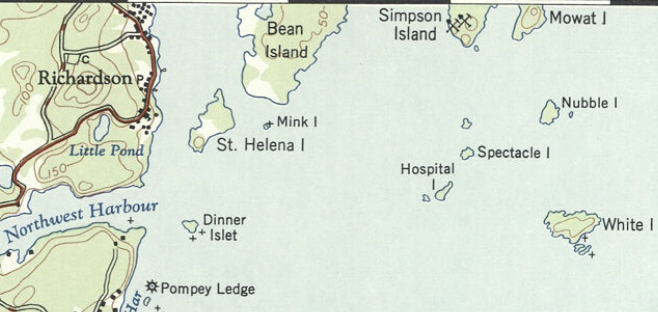

Geography
- Location: Bay of Fundy
- Area: 20 acres (8.1 ha)

Administration
- Canada
- Province: New Brunswick
- County: Charlotte
- Parish: West Isles Parish

White Island (also called Penguin Island and White Head Island) is an undeveloped island in the West Isles Parish of Charlotte County, New Brunswick, Canada, where the Bay of Fundy enters Passamaquoddy Bay.

It is composed of coarse red and gray conglomerate with granite boulders It is noted for its "steeply inclined rock faces and many boulders".

As of 1839, the island was one of four belonging to the Campobello Mill and Manufacturing Company. It was one of five islands dismissed by author Abraham Gesner in 1847 as "small eminences of little importance".

Fringing shoals 300+ metres offshore.

In 1912, it was granted to Charles S. Lord.

In December 1985, a study by Parks Canada assessed the island's value as $12,100.

In 2023 it was donated to the Nature Trust of New Brunswick by Douglas DeAngelis.

White Island, and a sill near Campobello's tip, are considered critical to the feeding areas for finback whales in the region.
