= Mink Island =

Island in New Brunswick, Canada

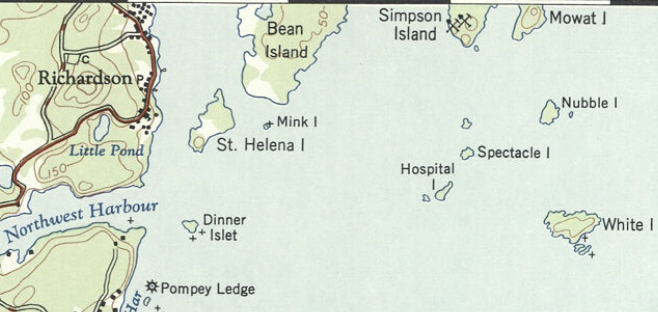
- Interactive map of Mink Island

Geography
- Location: Bay of Fundy
- Coordinates: 44°59′28″N 66°56′8″W

Administration
- Canada
- Province: New Brunswick
- County: Charlotte
- Parish: West Isles Parish

Mink Island is an undeveloped island in the West Isles Parish of Charlotte County, New Brunswick, Canada, where the Bay of Fundy enters Passamaquoddy Bay.
