= Auguste François Le Jolis =

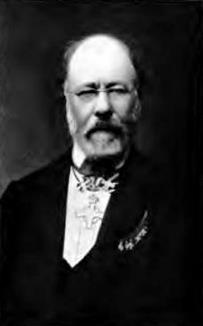
Auguste François le Jolis (1823-1904)

Auguste François Le Jolis (1 December 1823, Cherbourg - 20 August 1904, Cherbourg) was a French merchant, judge and botanist.

He is largely known for investigations of cryptogams (algae, hepatics, mosses) found in the department of Manche. In August 1852, he was a founding member of the Société Nationale des Sciences Naturelles et Mathématiques de Cherbourg. Le Jolis distributed the exsiccata series Algues marines de Cherbourg. He was elected to Corresponding membership of the Manchester Literary and Philosophical Society in 1859.

The algae genus Lejolisia (family Wrangeliaceae) was named after Le Jolis by Jean-Baptiste Édouard Bornet (1828-1911).

== Selected writings ==
- Observations sur quelques plantes rares découvertes aux environs de Cherbourg, 1847 - Observations of some rare plants discovered in the environs of Cherbourg.
- Lichens des environs de Cherbourg, 1859 - Lichens in the environs of Cherbourg.
- Plantes vasculaires des environs de Cherbourg, 1860 - Vascular plants in the environs of Cherbourg.
- Liste des algues marines de Cherbourg, 1863 - List of marine algae of Cherbourg.
- De la rédaction des flores locales au point de vue de la géographie botanique, 1874 - On the drafting of local floras from the point of view of botanical geography.
