= McMaster Island =

Island in New Brunswick, Canada

Macs Island
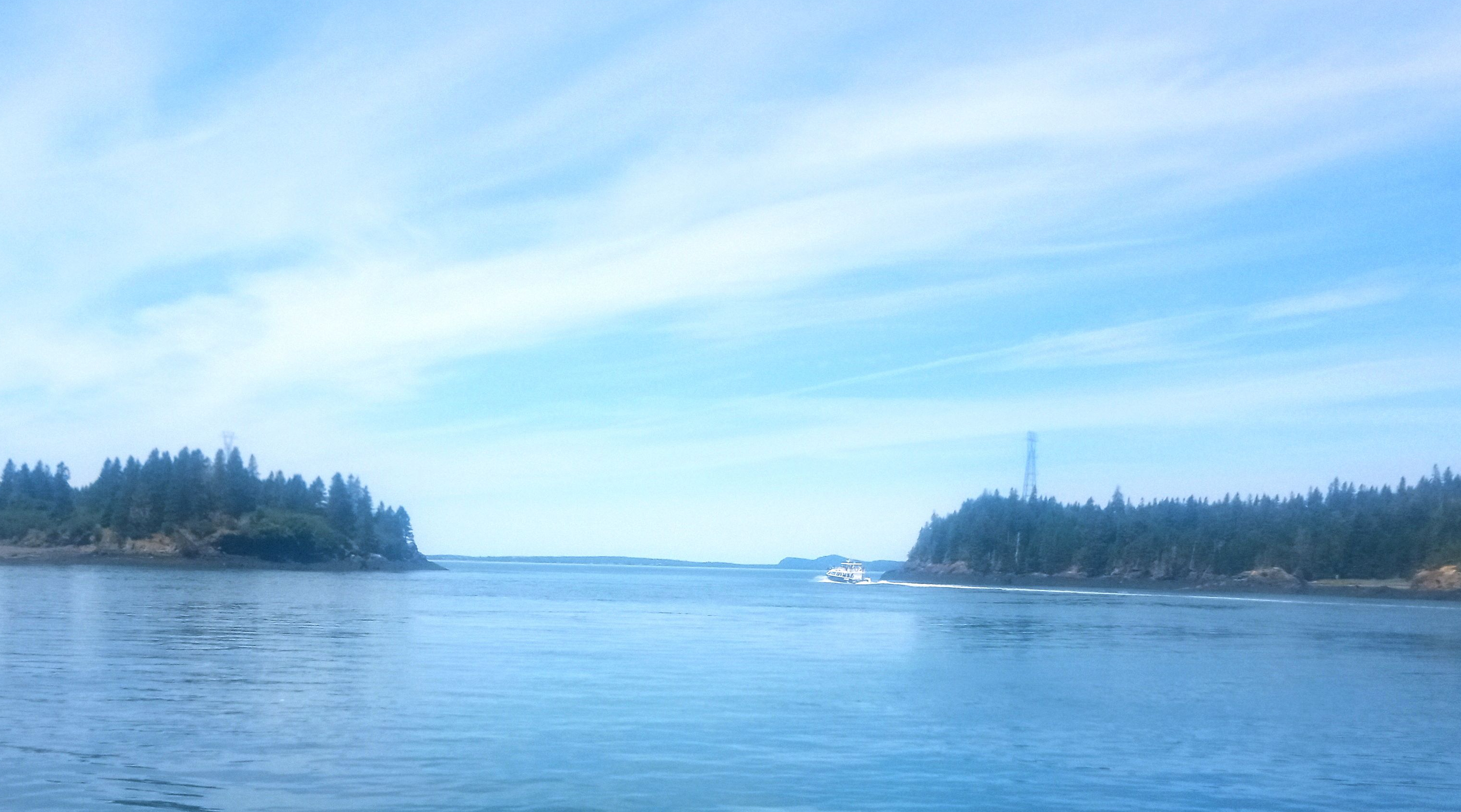
- A whale watching ship takes passengers through Doyle's Passage between Pendleton Island (left), and Macs Island (right) witih New Ireland in the foreground.

- Location within New Brunswick

Geography
- Location: Bay of Fundy
- Coordinates: 45°02′45″N 66°55′45″W
- Area: 180 ha (440 acres)
- Highest elevation: 107 m (351 ft)

Administration
- Canada
- Province: New Brunswick
- County: Charlotte
- Parish: West Isles Parish

McMaster Island (also called Macs Island, formerly called La Tete Island) is located in the Bay of Fundy between Pendleton Island and L'etete. The northern side of the island is silurian rock. It is the largest of the 40 isles in the eastern archipelago off Deer Island, New Brunswick, Canada.

The island has been identified as one of those written about in the 1604 writings of Samuel Champlain and Sieur de Monts.

It is frequented by dolphins and seals. In the late 1970s it was noted to no longer host previous nesting eagles.

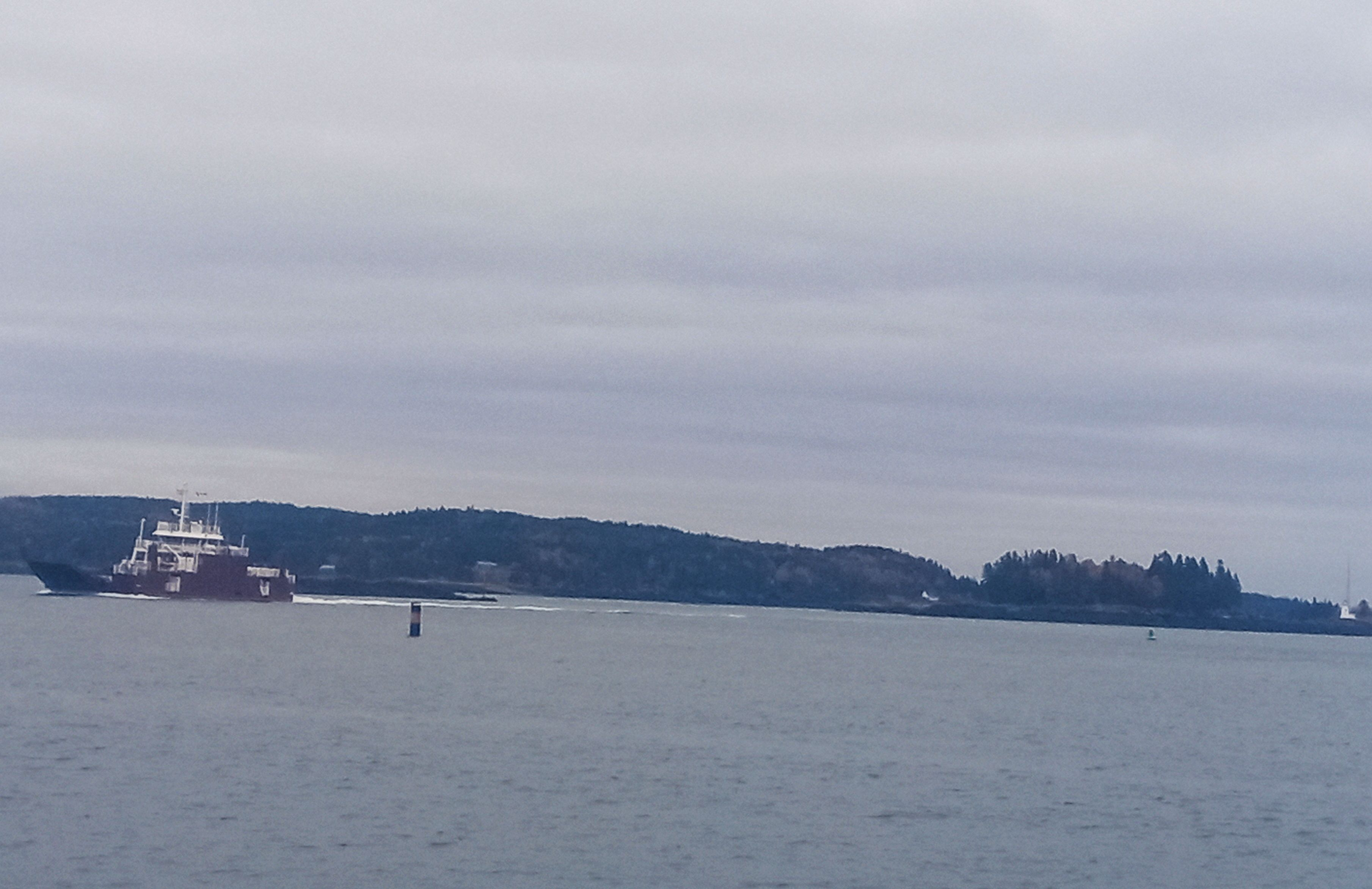
The Abnaki car ferry passing Macs Island with Green's Point Lighthouse visible on the far-right.

There has been interest in conservation efforts to secure the Ship's Cove inlet on the eastern shore of the island which is used as safe anchorage, and for picnickers and sightseers. Proposals for a tidal power station have proposed a dam between the mainland and McMaster Island, 500 metres long and further from Macs Island to Jameson Island onward to New Ireland, Pendleton Island, English Island and Deer Island.

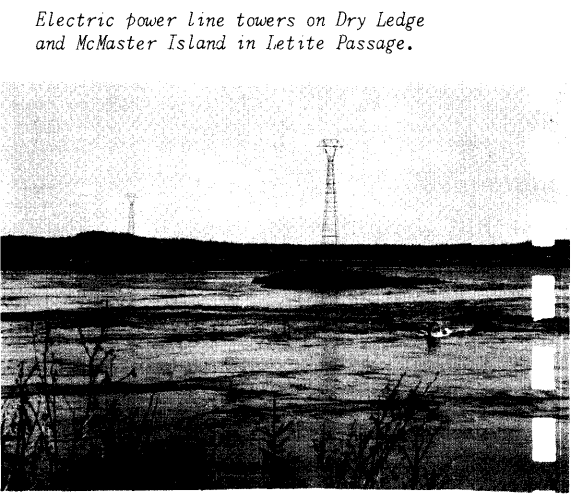
1961 photo of 140' power lines between Dry Ledge, and McMaster Island.

With one of the few saltwater ponds in the archipelago, it houses stickleback and mummichog fish, as well as birds such as kingfishers and herons. Shell middens on the island suggest familiarity to indigenous tribes.

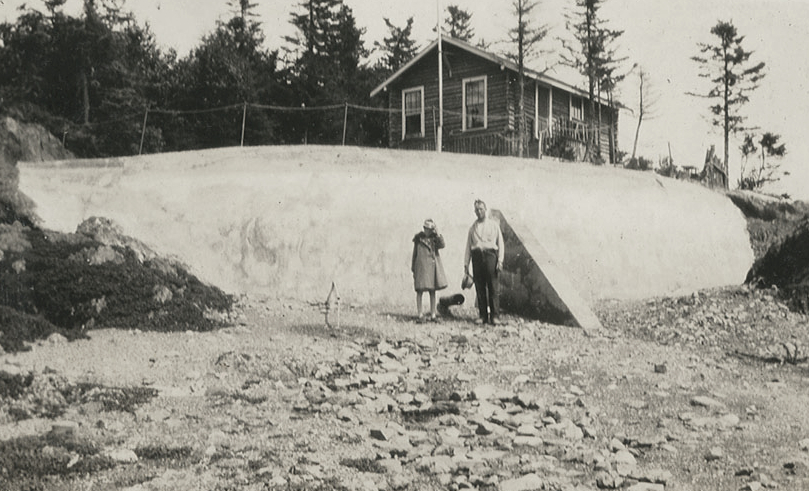
Home on Macs Island

It was originally owned by the family of Daniel McMaster and his three brothers. In 1829, James S. MacMaster transferred ownership of McMaster Island and Hardwood Island to Charlotte MacMaster, through his partner Mr. Allanshaw. The island was described by Thomas Baillie in 1832 as "high and broken...but is not settled".

The island, as well as Cochrane's Island, was listed for public auction in 1916.

In 1938, Raymond Greenlaw was hired to work on the power lines from McMaster Island to Pendleton Island to Deer Island, and he spent the next four decades largely operating as Deer Island's only representative of NB Power. He recounted the time a power line had gone down on Pendleton Island falling on three grazing cows "cooking them on the spot".

In December 1985, a study by Parks Canada assessed the island's value as $241,500. There is a green buoy marked "S9" north of the island.

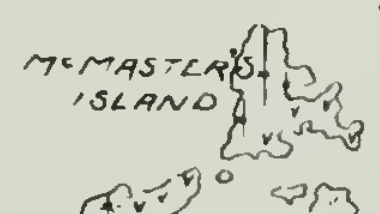
1914 chart of McMaster Island

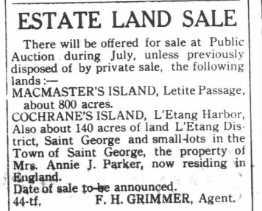
1916 auction notice

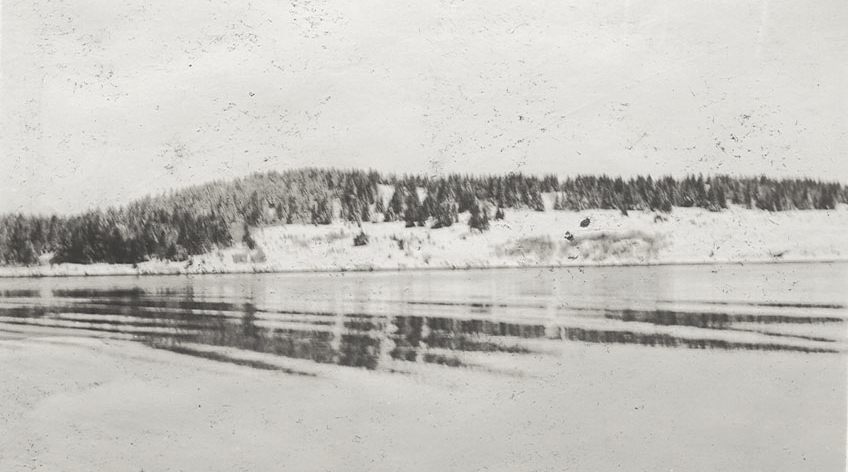
Charlotte County Archives photo
