= Green Island (New Brunswick) =

Island in New Brunswick, Canada

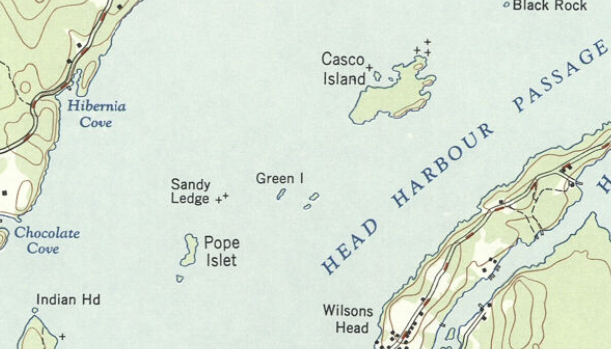
- Interactive map of Green Island

Geography
- Location: Bay of Fundy
- Coordinates: 44°56′56″N 66°56′38″W

Administration
- Canada
- Province: New Brunswick
- County: Charlotte
- Parish: West Isles Parish

Green Island is an undeveloped island in the West Isles Parish of Charlotte County, New Brunswick, Canada, where the Bay of Fundy enters Passamaquoddy Bay.

It was one of five islands dismissed by author Abraham Gesner in 1847 as "small eminences of little importance".

In the summer of 1986, benthic algae sublittoral research stations were set up across the region including on Green Island.

In 1832, commissioner of Crown Lands Thomas Baillie wrote that the island had "very little value".
