= Royal Gazette =

Royal Gazette or The Royal Gazette may refer to:

- The Royal Gazette (Bermuda), a daily newspaper in Bermuda
- The Royal Gazette (Jamaica), a defunct newspaper in Jamaica, founded in 1779
- The Royal Gazette, one name of a newspaper published by James Rivington during the American Revolutionary War
- The Royal Gazette (New Brunswick), the journal of the New Brunswick Crown-in-Council, published by the Queen's Printer
- Royal Gazette and Newfoundland Advertiser or Royal Gazette, Newfoundland's first newspaper, first published in 1807 by John Ryan
- Royal Gazette (Thailand), the public journal of the Government of Thailand
