= Thumb Cap Island =

Island in New Brunswick, Canada

- Interactive map of Thumb Cap Island

Geography
- Location: Bay of Fundy
- Coordinates: 45°12′50″N 66°06′15″W

Administration
- Canada
- Province: New Brunswick
- County: Charlotte

Thumb Cap Island (also called Thrumcap Island) is located off the edge of Manawagonish Island off the coast in Charlotte County, New Brunswick.

As with Manawagonish, Thumb Cap is owned by the Nature Trust of New Brunswick and held as an undeveloped bird sanctuary.
