= Campobello Mill and Manufacturing Company =

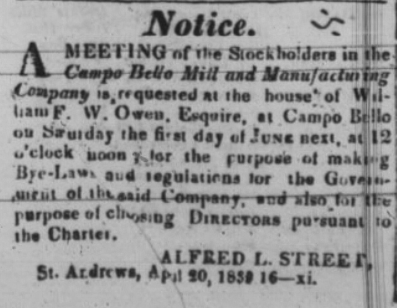
1839 advertisement for a meeting of Company stockholders

The Campobello Mill and Manufacturing Company was created in 1839 largely at the behest of William Fitzwilliam Owen, with the hope of stirring progress on Campobello Island in the Bay of Fundy, New Brunswick, Canada.

The "Act to Incorporate the Campo Bello Mill and Manufacturing Company" was passed March 1 1837, although it was not operational until 1839. The others involved in the 1837 incorporation included Sir Edward Campbell, Rick Owen, William Owen, Milatish Calkis, Thomas Wyer, Samuel Frye, Jon Wilx, Nehemiah Marks and others.

As of 1839, White Island, Sandy Island, Spruce Island and Casco Bay Island belonged to the Company. Fringing shoals 300+ metres offshore.

From 1839-1845, the Company produced its own scrip currency.
