= Pope's Folly Island =

Island in Washington County, Maine, United States of America

Coordinates: 44°52′05″N 66°59′02″W

Pope's Folly
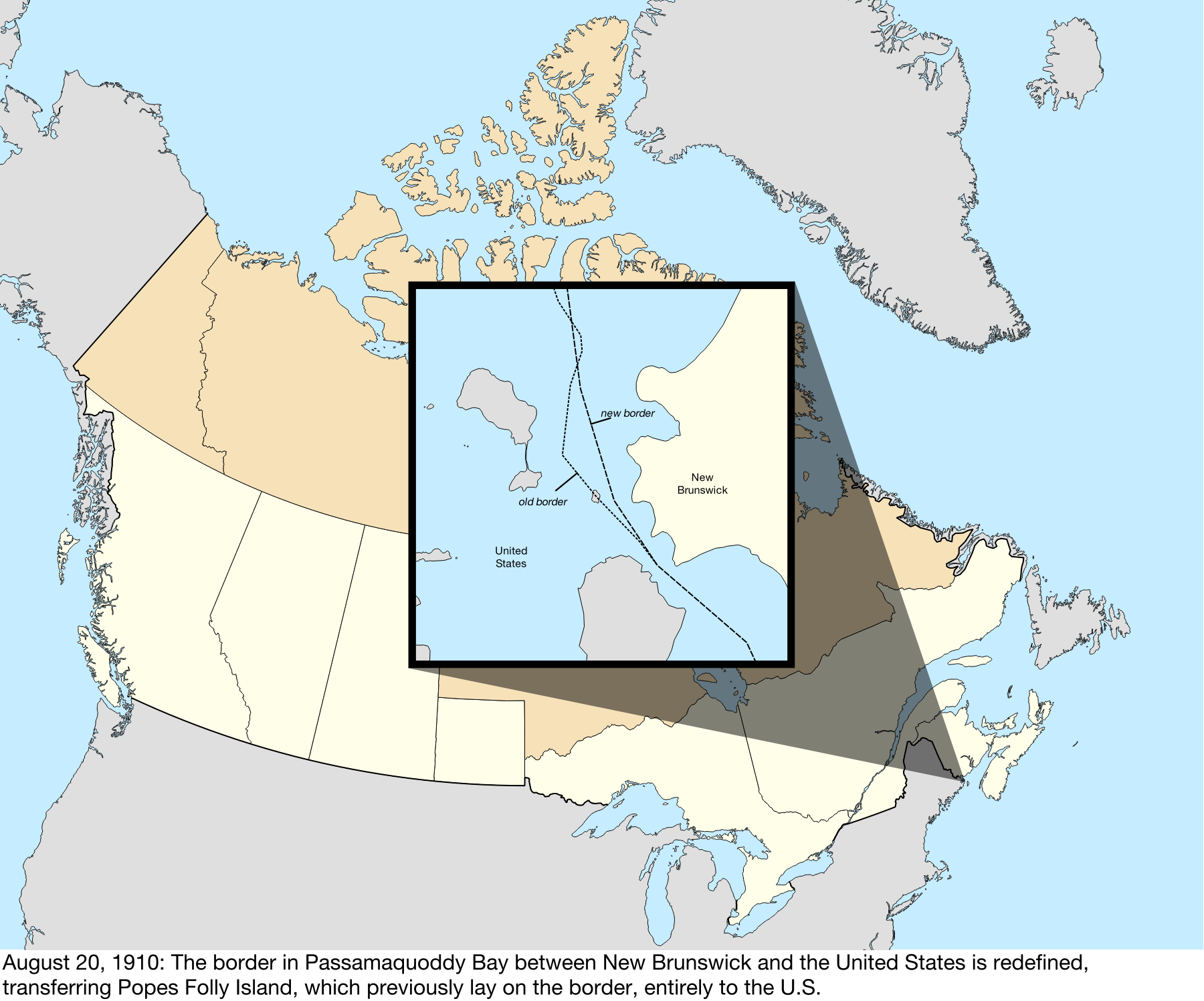
- A map showing the 1910 territorial evolution, shifting the border east to put Pope's Folly in the United States
- Interactive map of Pope's Folly

Geography
- Location: Bay of Fundy

Administration
- USA
- State: Maine
- County: Washington County

Pope's Folly Island (also called Harris' Island, Green Island or Mark Island) is a small 2 acres (0.81 ha) island located 0.2 miles (0.32 km) from the Canadian Campobello Island, but has been historically disputed whether it belongs to Canada or the United States.

It has strategic value as it controls the entry to the channel, yet Canadian admiralty charts originally ceded it to the Americans, while US hydrographic charts ceded it to Canada.

Since 1910, the island has been part of the United States. There is a geodetic triangulation station on a rocky ledge on the north end.

== History ==
Zibah Pope lived in Eastport, Maine working as a smuggler before moving to Saint George, New Brunswick while establishing a "trading post" on the island in 1812, taking advantage of the fact the international border ran through the center of it, where he built a storehouse - before losing a fortune and becoming a preacher. In 1823, the island's peculiar legal nature became the crucial point of two smuggling cases. A more romantic telling says that Pope was a woman-hating bachelor who retired to the island to avoid women, until the day came that he found himself having to save the life of a drowning widow.

In 1898, the US appointed Mr. Mendenhall and Great Britain appointed Mr. King, to locate the 1842 cast iron columns set in swamps near Amity, Maine and Richmond, New Brunswick that officially marked the boundary of the Treaty of Washington and determine on which side of a line between them Pope's Folly would lay.

In 1903, embers from a fire at the Lubec Sardine Company ignited the brush on Pope's Folly and devastated its trees. In 1909, Captain Young's schooner Rebecca went aground on Pope's Folly by error, and required towing.

President William Taft visited the area in 1911, stopping to view the island whose jurisdiction had been granted to the US, but did not visit the island. However a moose at that time swam ashore on the island, causing surprise.

== Gallery ==
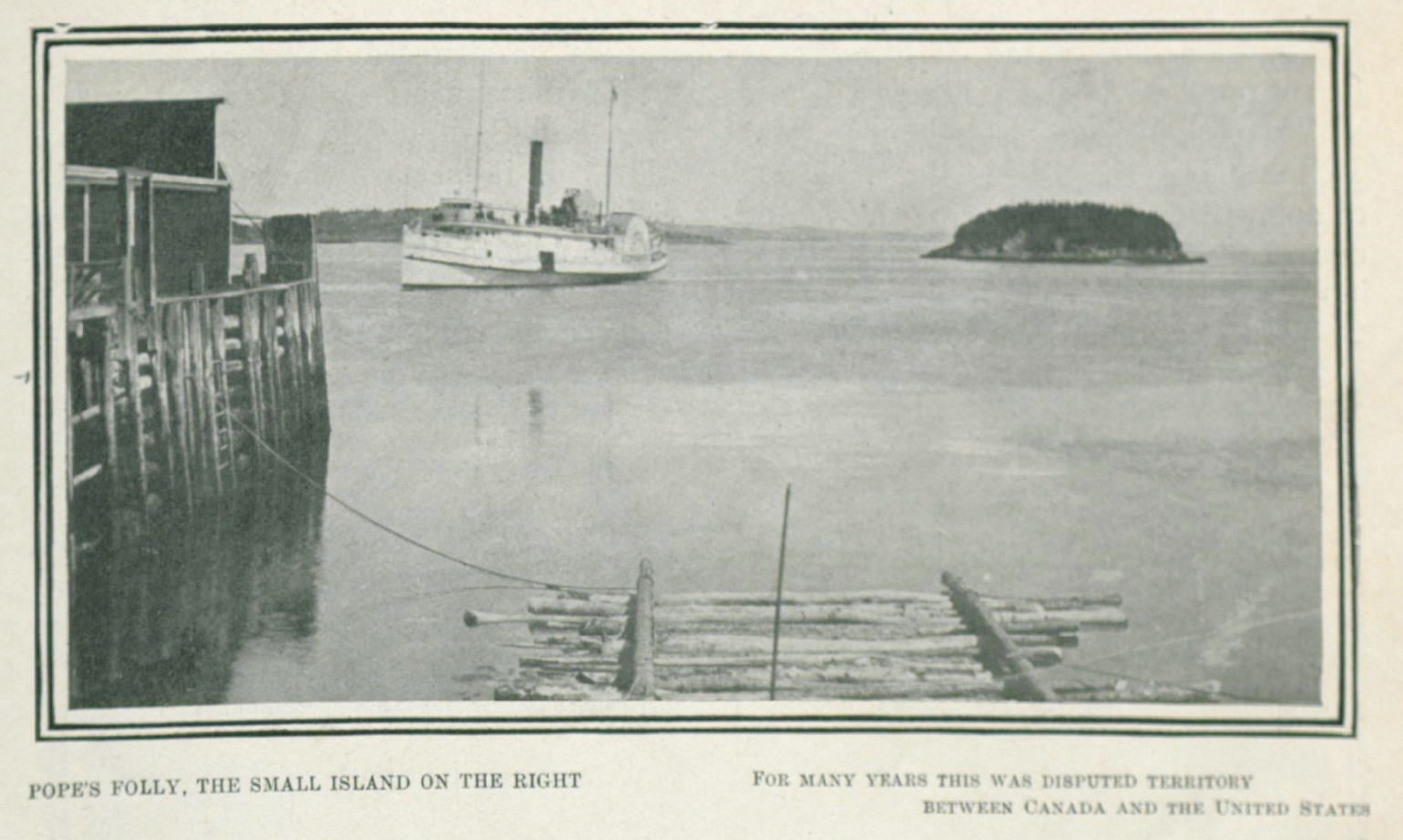

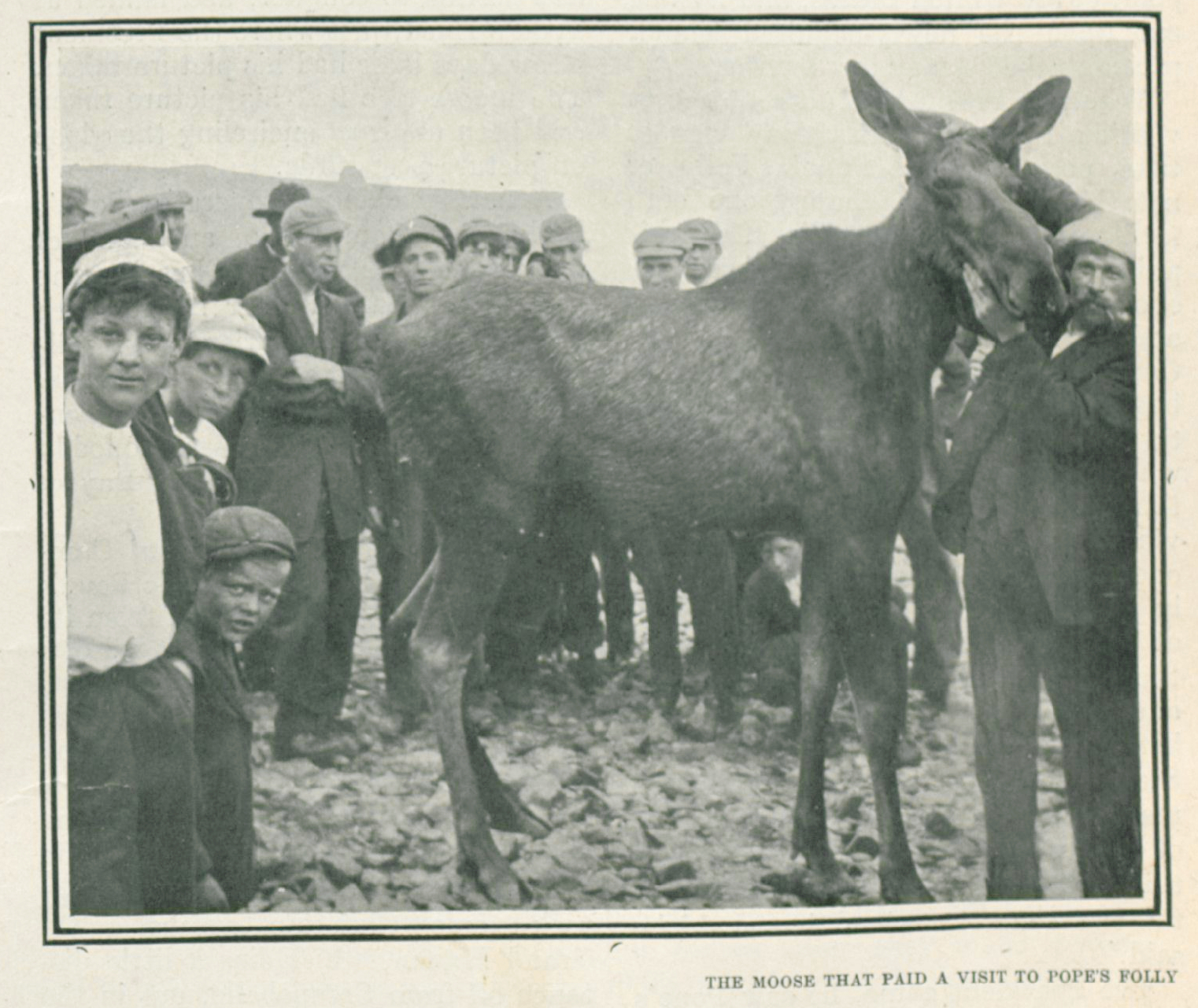
