= Hardwood Island =

Island in New Brunswick, Canada

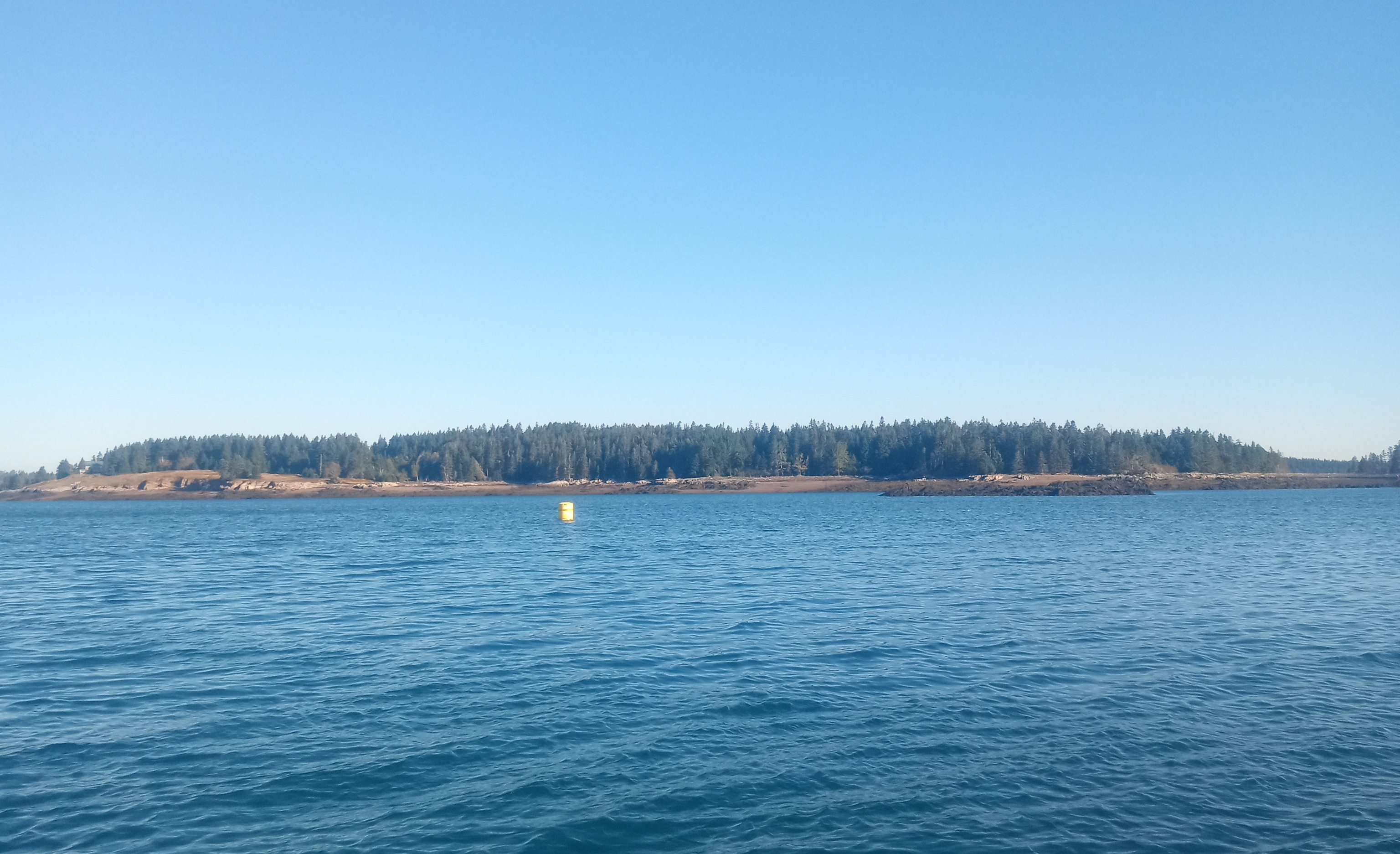
- Interactive map of Hardwood Island

Geography
- Location: Bay of Fundy
- Coordinates: 45°00′56″N 66°55′41″W
- Area: 45 to 50 acres (18 to 20 ha)
- Highest elevation: 9 m (30 ft)

Administration
- Canada
- Province: New Brunswick
- County: Charlotte
- Parish: West Isles Parish

Hardwood Island (also titled Howard Island, possibly phonetic error) is an undeveloped island in the West Isles Parish of Charlotte County, New Brunswick, Canada, where the Bay of Fundy enters Passamaquoddy Bay. It is a bedrock-cored forested knoll, with a large beach that is moderately used for camping due to its nearness to the mainland. There is a peat deposit on the eastern beach.

The recovery of arrowheads suggest it may have been inhabited or visited by Passamaquoddy natives.

A 1796 deed shows Thomas Pendleton purchased "Hardwood Island" from Thomas Doyle for £150, which is presumed to reference Pendleton's Island rather than this currently-named Hardwood Island.

As Warren Hathaway was unsuccessful in his bid to be granted Bar Island off the northern shore of Deer Island against the wishes of Thomas Farrell, between 1810-1817 he was awarded a grant of six small nearby islets including Hardwood, Simpson Island and Fish Island.

It was recommended for ecological preservation in 1975 due to a dense avian population including nesting Great Blue Herons, ospreys, eider ducks and herring gulls.

Today it is privately owned with a residence and barn.

== Geography and composition ==
Jameson, Crow, Hardwood, Parker and Partridge Island are all share a land shelf north of Deer Island, where the waters are generally less than 10m below mean sea level in depth.

It has copper pyrites in chloride slate, and a deposit of "brass-like sulphuret". In 1869 it was subject to exploratory work for mining but it never materialized.

There is a geodetic triangulation station on the highest point.

In December 1985, a study by Parks Canada assessed the island's value as $42,700.

In 1978, Mackay noted a high species abundance and diversity here, and five other nearby islands.

In the summer of 1986, benthic algae sublittoral research stations were set up across the region including on . It was one of four islands studied in 1997 for the impact of sea kayaking on the Bay of Fundy environment.
