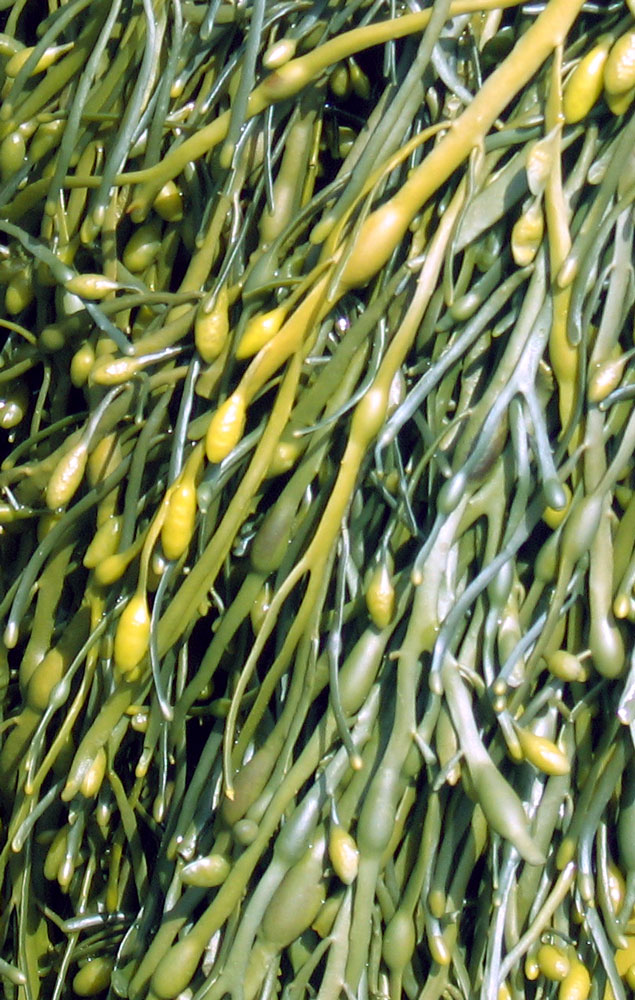

Scientific classification
- Domain: Eukaryota
- Clade: Sar
- Clade: Stramenopiles
- Division: Ochrophyta
- Class: Phaeophyceae
- Order: Fucales
- Family: Fucaceae
- Genus: Ascophyllum; Stackhouse, 1809
- Species: A. nodosum

Binomial name
- Ascophyllum nodosum (L.) Le Jolis
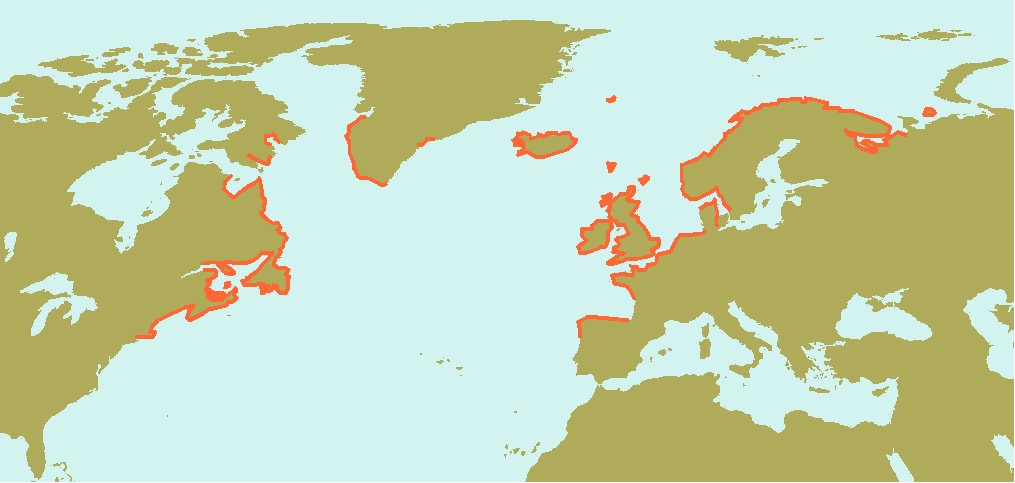
- Distribution

= Ascophyllum =

Species of seaweed

Ascophyllum nodosum is a large, common cold water seaweed or brown alga (Phaeophyceae) in the family Fucaceae. Its common names include knotted wrack, egg wrack, feamainn bhuí, rockweed, knotted kelp and Norwegian kelp. It grows only in the northern Atlantic Ocean, along the north-western coast of Europe (from the White Sea to Portugal) including east Greenland and the north-eastern coast of North America. Its range further south of these latitudes is limited by warmer ocean waters. It dominates the intertidal zone. Ascophyllum nodosum has been used numerous times in scientific research and has even been found to benefit humans through consumption.

== Scientific name history ==
Ascophyllum nodosum is the only species in the genus Ascophyllum. The original name (basionym) was Fucus nodosus Linnaeus 1753. The species was transferred to the genus Ascophyllum (as Ascophylla) by Stackhouse (Papenfuss 1950), under the name Ascophyllum laevigata (Guiry and Guiry 2020). The combination Ascophyllum nodosum was made by Le Jolis (1863).

== Description ==
Ascophyllum nodosum has long tough and leathery fronds, irregularly dichotomously branched fronds with large, egg-shaped air bladders set in series at regular intervals along the fronds and not stalked. The air bladders create a way for fronds broken by wave exposure or other causes to be dispersed and regrow in other areas. While the fronds can reach up to 2 m, the length depends on wave exposure: the length increases with water velocity until a certain point, then decreases as waves become more intense. The fronds can reach 2 m in length and are attached by a holdfast to rocks and boulders. In rare cases, the fronds can reach 6m long. The fronds are olive-green, olive-brown in color and somewhat compressed, but without a midrib. Young shoots are yellow, however darken with age.

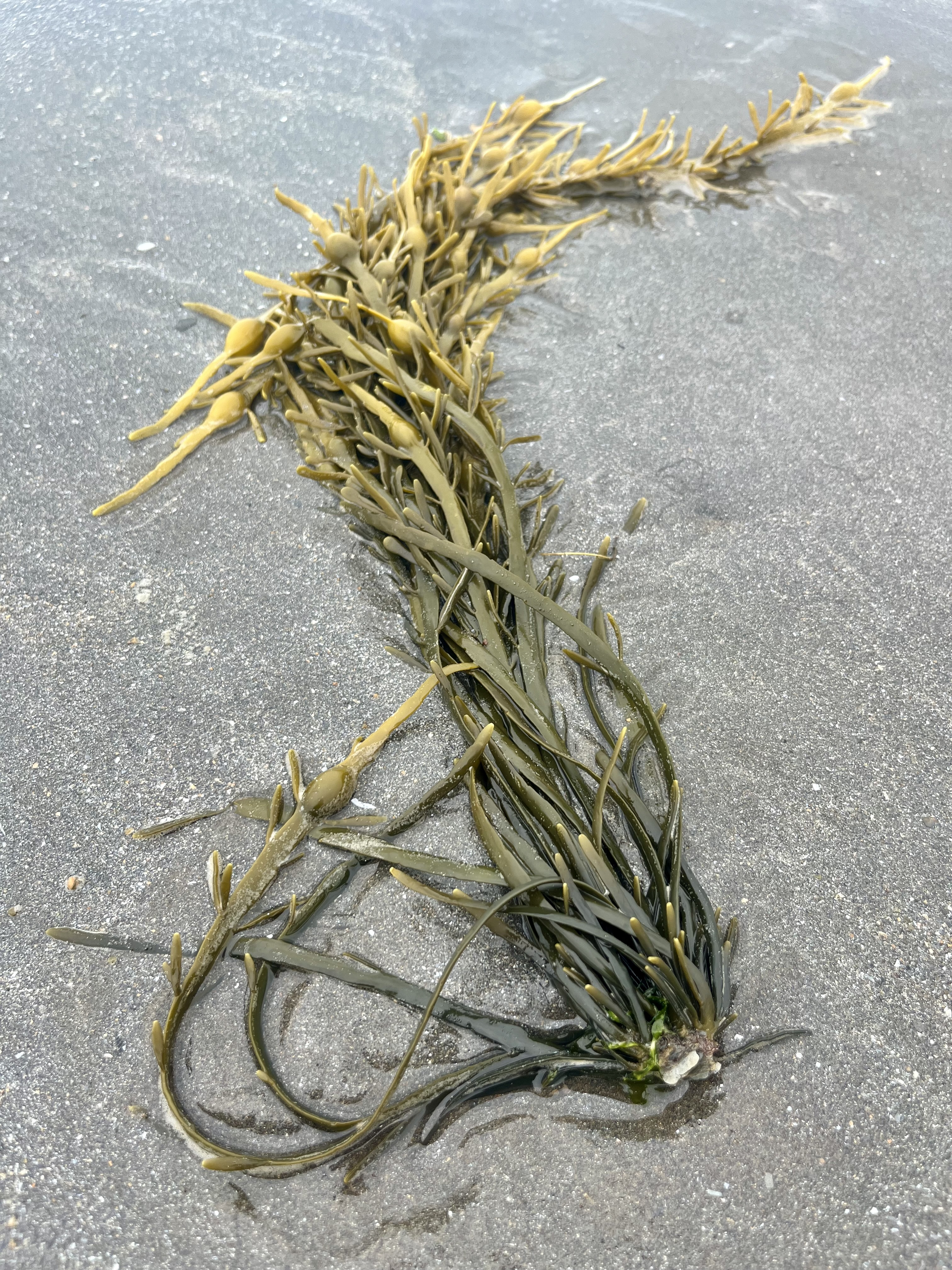
Contrast between darker colored shoots and lighter colored fronds

== Reproduction ==
Each individual is dioecious, either male or female. The gametes are produced in the spring in conceptacles embedded in yellowish receptacles on short branches. A year after the gamete is fertilized and forms a zygote, the first frond grows, and at the beginning of year 2, an air bladder forms, which creates a way to age individuals.

=== Varieties and forms ===
Several different varieties and forms of this species have been described, including the two below.

- Ascophyllum nodosum var. minor has been described from Larne Lough in Northern Ireland.
- Free-floating forms of this species are found in, for example, A. n. mackaii Cotton, which is found at very sheltered locations, such as at the heads of sea lochs in Scotland and Ireland.

== Ecology ==
Ascophyllum nodosum is found mostly on sheltered sites on shores in the midlittoral, where it can become the dominant species in the littoral zone.

The species is found in a range of coastal habitats from sheltered estuaries to moderately exposed coasts, and often it dominates the intertidal zone (although subtidal populations are known to exist in very clear waters). However, it is rarely found on exposed shores, and if it is found, the fronds are usually small and badly scratched. This seaweed grows quite slowly, 0.5% per day, carrying capacity is about 40 kg wet weight per square meter, and it may live for 10–15 years. It may typically overlap in distribution with Fucus vesiculosus and Fucus serratus. Its distribution is also limited by salinity, wave exposure, temperature, desiccation, and general stress. It may take approximately five years before becoming fertile. Ascophyllum nodosum is an autotroph, meaning that it makes its own food by photosynthesis. The air bladders on A. nodosum serve as a flotation device, which allows sunlight to reach the fronds better, aiding photosynthesis.

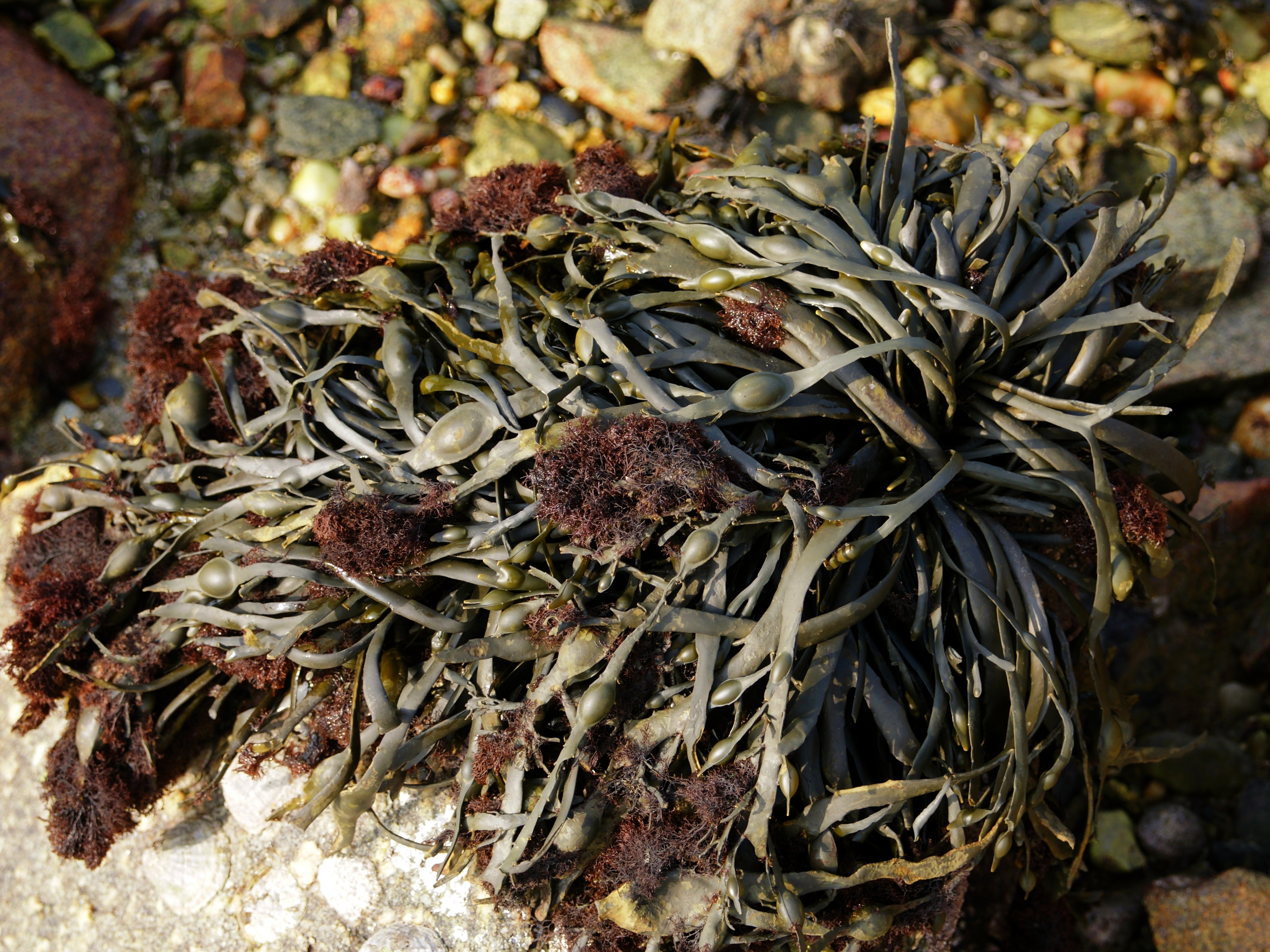
Epiphytic red algae on knotted wrack at Roscoff, France

Excess sperm can be released during the reproduction of Ascophyllum nodosum, which can then act as a food source for plankton consumers. The coverage created by mats of A. nodosum can serve as protection for several marine species, including barnacles (Semibalanus balanoides), periwinkles (genus Littorina), and marine isopods.

Phlorotannins in A. nodosum act as chemical defenses against the marine herbivorous snail, Littorina littorea.

Polysiphonia lanosa (L.) T.A. Christensen is a small red alga, commonly found growing in dense tufts on Ascophyllum whose rhizoids penetrate the host. It is considered by some as parasitic; however, as it only receives structural support from knotted wrack (not parasitically), it acts as an epiphyte.

== Distribution ==
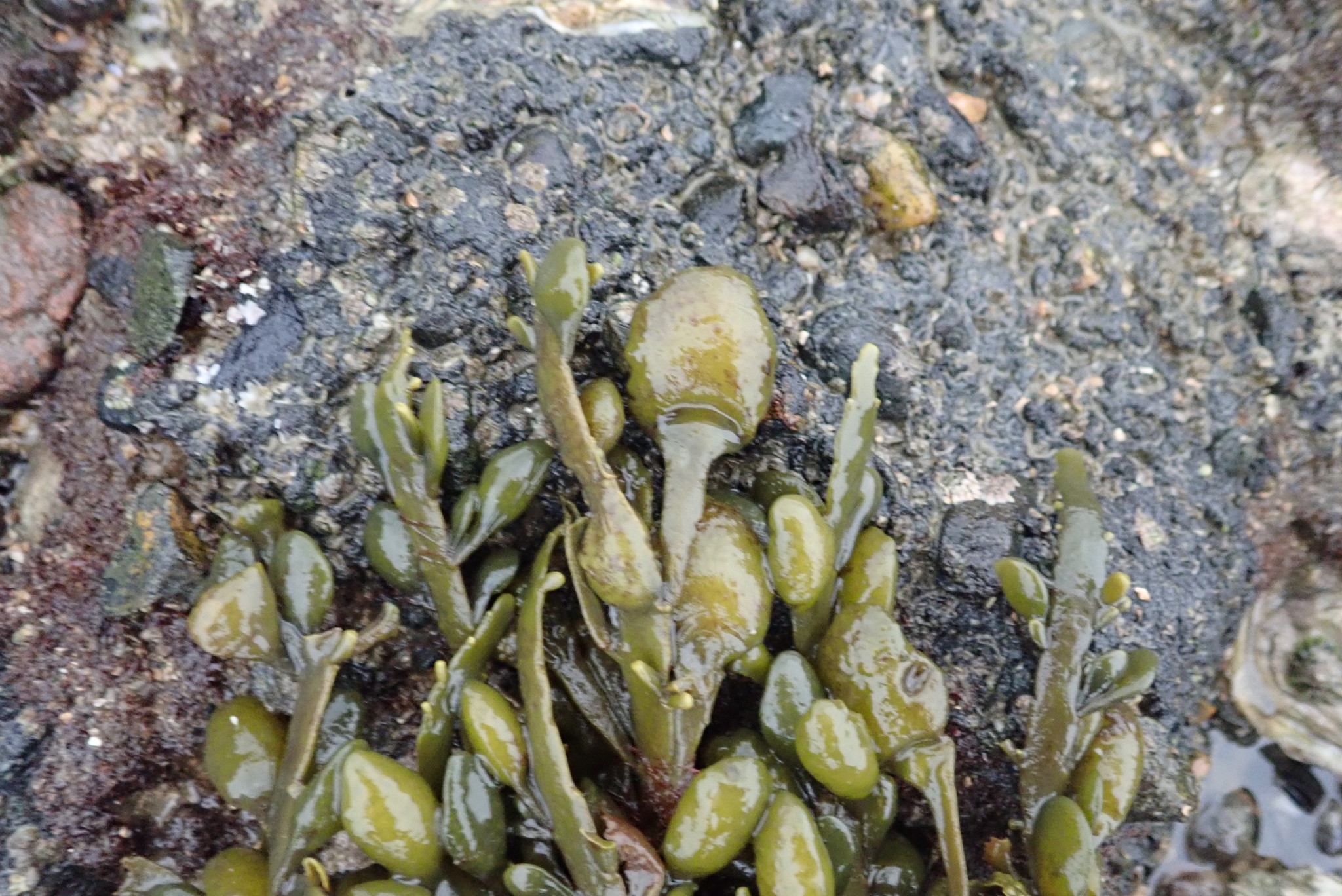
Observed in Zeeland, Netherlands

This species has been recorded in Europe from Ireland, the White Sea, the Faroe Islands, Norway, Britain and Isle of Man, Netherlands, and North America from the Bay of Fundy, Nova Scotia, Baffin Island, Hudson Strait, Labrador, and Newfoundland. The southern boundary of A. nodosum ends around Long Island, NY, on account of higher water temperatures when traveling farther south. It has been recorded as an accidental introduction near San Francisco, California, and eradicated as a potential invasive species.

== Uses ==
The consumption of Ascophyllum nodosum has been proven to have dental benefits in humans, dogs and cats. In addition to dental benefits, A. nodosum can reduce inflammation and speed up healing, especially after a serious injury. Brown algae contains fucoidans, which are sulfated, fucose-rich polymers. Fucoidans block selectins, which are receptors on white blood cells that allow those cells to enter a tissue, causing inflammation. Since the fucoidans block inflammation, A. nodosum can be considered an anti-inflammatory.

Ascophyllum nodosum extracts can be used to control body weight in obese mice. There is potential for these extracts to be efficient in humans, but most studies focus on the effects in small rodents, so more testing needs to be done.

Ascophyllum nodosum is harvested for use in alginates, fertilisers, and the manufacture of seaweed meal for animal and human consumption. Due to the high level of vitamins and minerals that bioaccumulate in A. nodosum, it has been used in Greenland as a dietary supplement. It has also been used for certain herbal teas, particularly kelp teas. It has long been used as an organic and mainstream fertilizer for many varieties of crops due to its combination of both macronutrients, (N, P, and K) and micronutrients (Ca, Mg, S, Mn, Cu, Fe, Zn, etc.). It also contains cytokinins, auxin-like gibberellins, betaines, mannitol, organic acids, polysaccharides, amino acids, and proteins which are all very beneficial and widely used in agriculture. Ireland, Scotland and Norway have provided the world's principal alginate supply.

Ascophyllum nodosum is frequently used as packaging material for baitworm and lobster shipments from New England to various domestic and international locations. Ascophyllum itself has occasionally been introduced to California, and several species frequently found in baitworm shipments, including Carcinus maenas and Littorina saxatilis, may have been introduced to the San Francisco Bay region this way.

=== Toxicological uses ===
Because the age of the different parts of A. nodosum can be identified by its shoots, it has also been used to monitor concentrations of heavy metals in seawater. A concentration factor for zinc has been reported to be of the order 10^{4}. It has been used in this way for over fifty years, and studies have shown that A. nodosum absorbs cobalt, cadmium, lead, and indium metal ions out of the water. It has also been used to track environmental radioactivity.

== Chemistry ==
Ascophyllum nodosum contains the phlorotannins tetraphlorethol C and tetrafucol A.

== Harvesting ==
Ascophyllum nodosum is commercially harvested in several countries, including Norway, Ireland, Scotland, France, Iceland, Canada and in USA. In some countries such as Ireland, A. nodosum has been harvested for centuries and the harvest has been maintained at sustainable levels since the late 1940s. Harvest can be done manually: on foot at low tide using a knife or sickle or from a boat using a cutter rake. It can also be harvested mechanically using specifically designed boats. In some countries, a bed of A. nodosum will be harvested intensively (>50% of the biomass removed) and left fallow for 3–5 years. In Canada and in Cobscook Bay, Maine, USA, only between 17 and 25% of the biomass of a management sector can be harvested annually. Under this harvest regime, beds can recover their harvested biomass within a year, and no long-term impact of the harvest on the biomass or morphology of A. nodosum has been observed. Several studies have looked at the impact of the harvest on associated species and have found only limited short-term impacts.

Opponents of its wild harvest point to the alga's high habitat value for over 100 marine species, including benthic invertebrates, commercially important fish, wild ducks, shorebirds, and seabirds.
