= Thomas Baillie (British Army officer) =

Canadian politician

Thomas Baillie (4 October 1796 – 20 May 1863) became a lieutenant in the Royal Welsh Fusiliers in March 1815, saw some service during the flight of Napoleon Bonaparte and then served at Limerick (Ireland).

He married in 1824, entered the Colonial Office the same year, and quickly was appointed commissioner of Crown lands and Surveyor General of New Brunswick. This important appointment was likely due to family influence and obligations owed to the Baillie family. The colonial secretary, Lord Bathurst, was a name often use by Baillie during his time in New Brunswick to bolster his authority.

Baillie's years in New Brunswick were often a study in the arrogant exercise of power although the Colonial Office was supportive of his results.

His son W. D. H. Baillie went to New Zealand and was the longest serving member of the New Zealand Legislative Council (1861–1922).
