= Fundy Isles =

Bay islands in New Brunswick, Canada

Coordinates: 45°00′N 65°45′W

- Interactive map of Fundy Isles

Geography
- Location: The Bay of Fundy
- Archipelago: Fundy Isles
- Major islands: Grand Manan Island, Campobello Island and Deer Island

The Fundy Isles(French: Îles-de-Fundy) is the term given to a loosely defined group of Canadian bay islands in the Bay of Fundy along the southwestern coast of New Brunswick, Canada, in the provincial county of Charlotte which borders the U.S. state of Maine to its west.

There are over 25 islands within this group including the West Isles. Some of the larger islands are inhabited year-round while some of the smaller islands may have seasonal residents. the three largest are Grand Manan, Campobello Island, and Deer Island. This trio is sometimes marketed in tourism material as the Fundy Sisters. Deer Island shares its coastline with not only the Bay of Fundy, but also Passamaquoddy Bay to its north. Smaller islands exist along each of the larger islands as well as within Passamaquoddy Bay and along the New Brunswick mainland. Some of these islands include White Head Island (situated off Grand Manan's southeast coast), Macs Island and Pendleton Island (both situated between Deer Island and the New Brunswick mainland), Minister's Island and Hospital Island (situated in Passamaquoddy Bay).

View from Southwest Head Lighthouse on Grand Manan Island

The region was first inhabited roughly 13,000 years ago by Paleo-Indian peoples. In more modern times, before European contact, Wabanaki peoples, namely the Passamaquoddy people called this region home. Following the short-lived colonization of Saint Croix Island, the first attempt at permanent European colonization in 1604 by the French in this broader region, other Europeans started arriving. Starting in this time period, the region gained political importance as a contested borderland between European powers vying for control as well as an economic hub for resource extraction and trade. In the late 18th and early 19th centuries, the Fundy Isles became "one of the great smuggling centres of the North Atlantic world".

In the modern day, the region is still politically and economically important due to its location between the United States and Canada. Focusing on the economically importance its high degree of ecological productivity supports a large fishing industry as well as a strong tourism sector, reflected in the number of protected areas such as Roosevelt Campobello International Park, Clark Gregory Nature Preserve, Navy Island Nature Preserve, and numerous other places of interest.

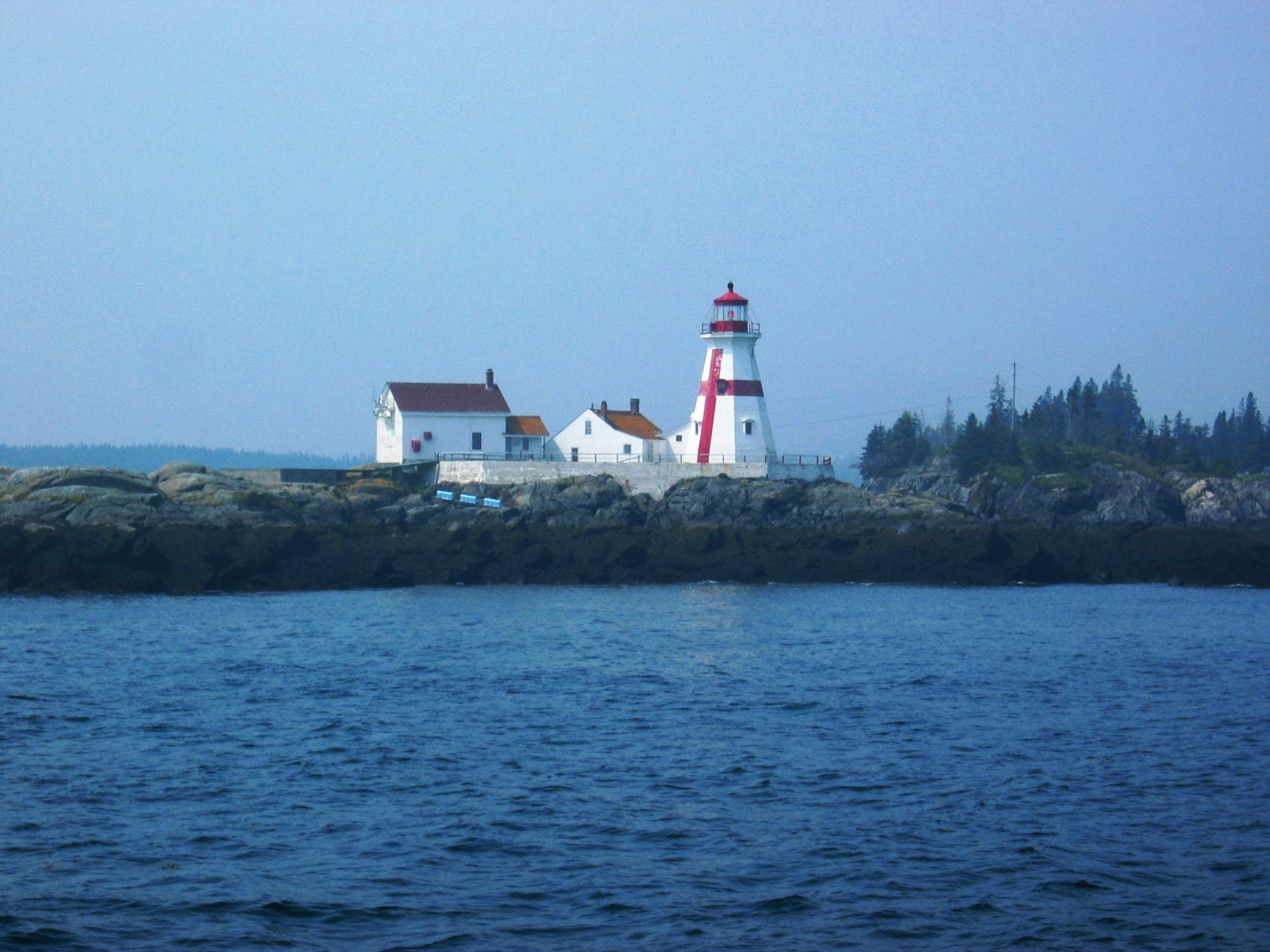
Campobello Island lighthouse on Campobello Island.

== Physical Geography ==
=== Boundaries of Region ===
The Fundy Isles can be further divided into the following clusters: The Grand Manan Archipelago, West Isles and Passages, and The Wolves.

Islands and rocks of the Fundy Isles
‡ denotes at least part of the island is a nature preserve ⛯ denotes the island has a light station
Grand Manan Archipelago	Black Rocks, Cheney Island, Gannet Rock⛯,Grand Manan ‡⛯, Duck Islands‡⛯, Gull Islet, Gull Rock, Hay Island, Kent Island, Little Wood Island, Long Island‡, Machias Seal Island⛯, Nantucket Island, North Green Island, North Rock, Outer Wood Island, Pumpkin Islet, Ross Island‡⛯, Sheep Island, South Green Island, West Pumpkin Island, Western Green Island, White Head Island⛯, White Horse Islet, Wood Island
West Isles and Passages	Adam Island, Bar Island, Barnes Island‡, Beans Island, Bliss Islands‡⛯, Campobello island‡, Casco Bay Island, Cherry Island⛯), Cod Rock, Crow Island, Currie Rock, Deer Island‡⛯, Dinner Island, Duck Islands, English Island, Fish island, Green Island, Hardwood Island, Head Harbour Island⛯, Hospital Island(West Isles), Hospital Island(St.Andrews), Indian Island, Jameson Island, Jouett's Island, Little Island, McMaster Island, Marble Island, Ministers Island, Mink Island, Mohawk Island, Mowat Island‡, Navy Island‡⛯, New Ireland‡, Nubble island‡, Parker Island, Pendleton Island‡, Popes Island, Partridge Island, Sandy Island, Simpson Island, Spectacle Islands, Spruce Island, St Helena Island, The Pup, Tinkers Island, White Horse Island‡, White Island‡, Yellow Rock
The Wolves	Buttermilk Rock, Eastern Wolf Island, Flat Wolf Island, Green Rock, Horseshoe Rock, Molasses Rock, South Wolf Island, Spruce Island

=== Tides & Hydrography ===
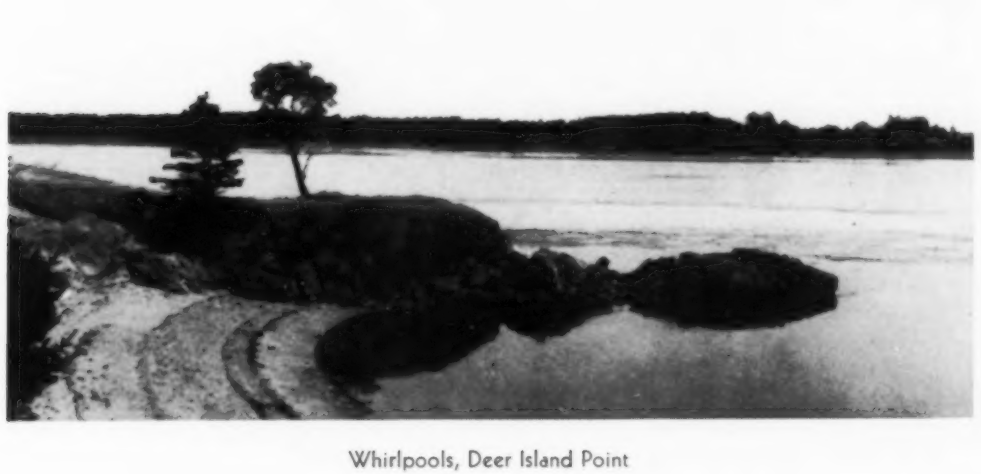
historical photographs of Old Sow

The region is fully surrounded by the Bay of Fundy which has semi-diurnal tides like much of North America as well as some of the largest tidal ranges in the world. This results in unique features such as the Old Sow whirlpool which is the largest whirlpool in the Western Hemisphere. Old Sow is located off the southwestern shore of Deer and Northeastern shore of Moose Island, the island home to Eastport.

=== Climate ===
The Fundy Isles has a humid continental climate (Dfb) with a strong maritime influence. This results in very comfortable falls, springs, and summers as well as a milder winter compared to the rest of the province.

== History ==
In 1824, Lt. Governor Sir Howard Douglas declined a request to form a new county out of the islands, noting "the quality of society on Campobello is such that insufficient persons could be found to act as magistrates, justices of the peace...serious dissension exists in all three islands". He wrote to Lord Bathurst the following year, noting that 80% of the 2,800 crates of tea consumed in New Brunswick were smuggled through these three islands.

In the late 18th and early 19th centuries the Fundy Isles became "one of the great smuggling centres of the North Atlantic", and historian Joshua Smith has noted the prevalence of smuggling based on the islands, noting “the more government forces attempted to halt unregulated trade, the more apparent it became to locals that the state was an unwelcomed and alien force”.

== Administration and Demographics ==
=== Administration ===
Within New Brunswick's political divisions the Fundy Isles are part of the Southwest New Brunswick Regional Service Commission, which provides services to the region. The services include regional economic development, tourism promotion, regional transportation planning, and several other services to better support the region. The regions were created by the Regional Service Delivery Act which divided New Brunswick into 12 regions to better provide services.
