= Bar Island (disambiguation) =

Bar Island is an island in Bar Harbor, Maine, US.

Bar Island may also refer to:

- Bar Island (New Brunswick), two islands in the Bay of Fundy, New Brunswick, Canada
- Bar Island, a moraine in Sandy Point State Reservation, Massachusetts, US
- Bar Island (Antarctica), a small island off the Antarctic Peninsula
- Bar Island (New South Wales), a small island in the Hawkesbury River of Australia

== See also ==
- Islet, a very small island made of rock, sand, and/or coral
- Shoal, a natural submerged ridge, bank, or bar that consists of, or is covered by, sand
