= Green Islands (Canada) =

Island in New Brunswick, Canada

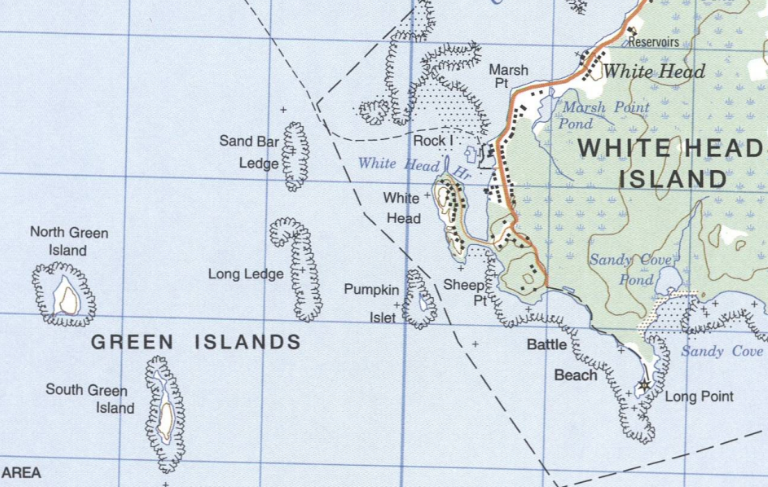
- Interactive map of Green Islands

Geography
- Location: Bay of Fundy
- Coordinates: 44°36′57″N 66°45′23″W
- Highest elevation: 6 m (20 ft)

Administration
- Canada
- Province: New Brunswick
- County: Charlotte
- Parish: Grand Manan Parish

The Green Islands are undeveloped islands in the Grand Manan Parish of Charlotte County, New Brunswick, Canada in the Bay of Fundy. They lie between of Wood Island and White Horse Island.

They appear to be named for William Green, who was placed in charge of nearby Wood Island by William Ross and whose descendents laid strong claim to its future.

The two major islands are "North Green Island" and "South Green Island", and form a Class 2 Protected Natural Area. just above the larger Kent Island grouping of protected areas. They are Class II Protected Natural Areas, administered by the Nature Trust of New Brunswick. In 1971, Katharine Scherman wrote about the colony of gray seals on Western Green Island.
