= Nantucket Island (New Brunswick) =

Island in New Brunswick, Canada

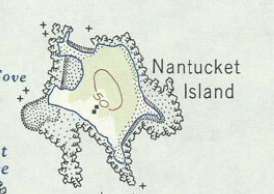
- Nantucket Island on a 1953 map
- Interactive map of Nantucket Island

Geography
- Location: Bay of Fundy
- Coordinates: 44°41′52″N 66°43′20″W
- Area: 32 ha (79 acres)

Administration
- Canada
- Province: New Brunswick
- County: Charlotte
- Parish: Grand Manan Parish

Nantucket Island is a privately owned island between Woodward's Cove and the Duck Islands in the Grand Manan Parish of Charlotte County, New Brunswick, Canada in the Bay of Fundy.

Most of its 80 acres are arable, and it has historically been used to grow potatoes, turnips, wheat, oats and barley. Over the hundred years that it belonged to the Moses and Cheney families, "Nantucket Island served as an outdoor laboratory for marine biology, ornithology and horticulture".

== History ==
In 1806, William Gactomb became the first settler on the island. In 1829 Moses Cheney, son of William Cheney of Cheney Island, also settled on the island and his son the naturalist Simeon .F. Cheney lived out seventy years on the island. As of 1831, the island was jointly owned by William Hazen and William Pagan.

The island was historically seen as a trove of flora and Fauna to be studied, with naturalist Spencer Fullerton Baird visiting the island six times before 1886 and writing in his 1869 report to the Smithsonian Institution about the island.

In 1910, a male lark bunting was shot on the island by Allen Moses, later determined to be only the fourth specimen caught along the Eastern coast.

There were visits to the island as well by Senator George F. Edmunds at Baird's recommendation, as well as naturalists Addison Emery Verrill, Francis Hobart Herrick and others.

In 1909, John Russell purchased the island from Cheney.

== Today ==
NB Tourism recommends not landing on the island, as resident bulls may be hostile. Salmon aquaculture sites sit on the eastern side of the island.
