= Green Islands =

Green Islands may refer to:

- Green Islands (Papua New Guinea)
- Green Islands (Canada)

== See also ==
- Green Island (disambiguation)
