= Spectacle Islands =

Island in New Brunswick, Canada

Spectacle Island
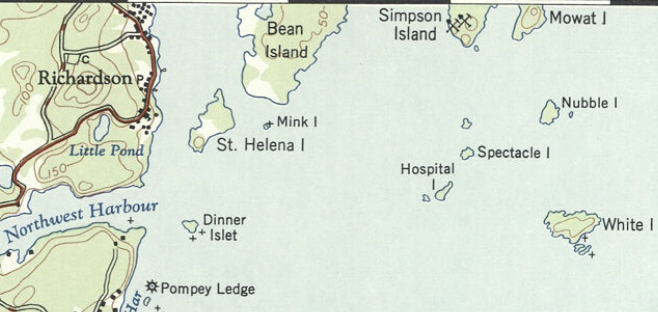
- Interactive map of Spectacle Island

Geography
- Location: Bay of Fundy
- Coordinates: 44°59′24″N 66°54′53″W
- Area: 1.4 acres (0.57 ha)

Administration
- Canada
- Province: New Brunswick
- County: Charlotte
- Parish: West Isles Parish

Spectacle Island is an undeveloped island in the West Isles Parish of Charlotte County, New Brunswick, Canada, where the Bay of Fundy enters Passamaquoddy Bay.

In 1929, author Frances Gillmor published "Thumbcap Weir" which was set on a West Isles Parish, New Brunswick island titled "Deadman's Island" which was connected at low tide to a "Thumbcap" which held a herring weir. The island appears to have been modeled off Jouett's Island and Hospital Island and situated impossibly north of Spectacle Islands but south of White Horse Island.
