= The Wolves (New Brunswick) =

Islands in New Brunswick, Canada

Native name: Malsumook
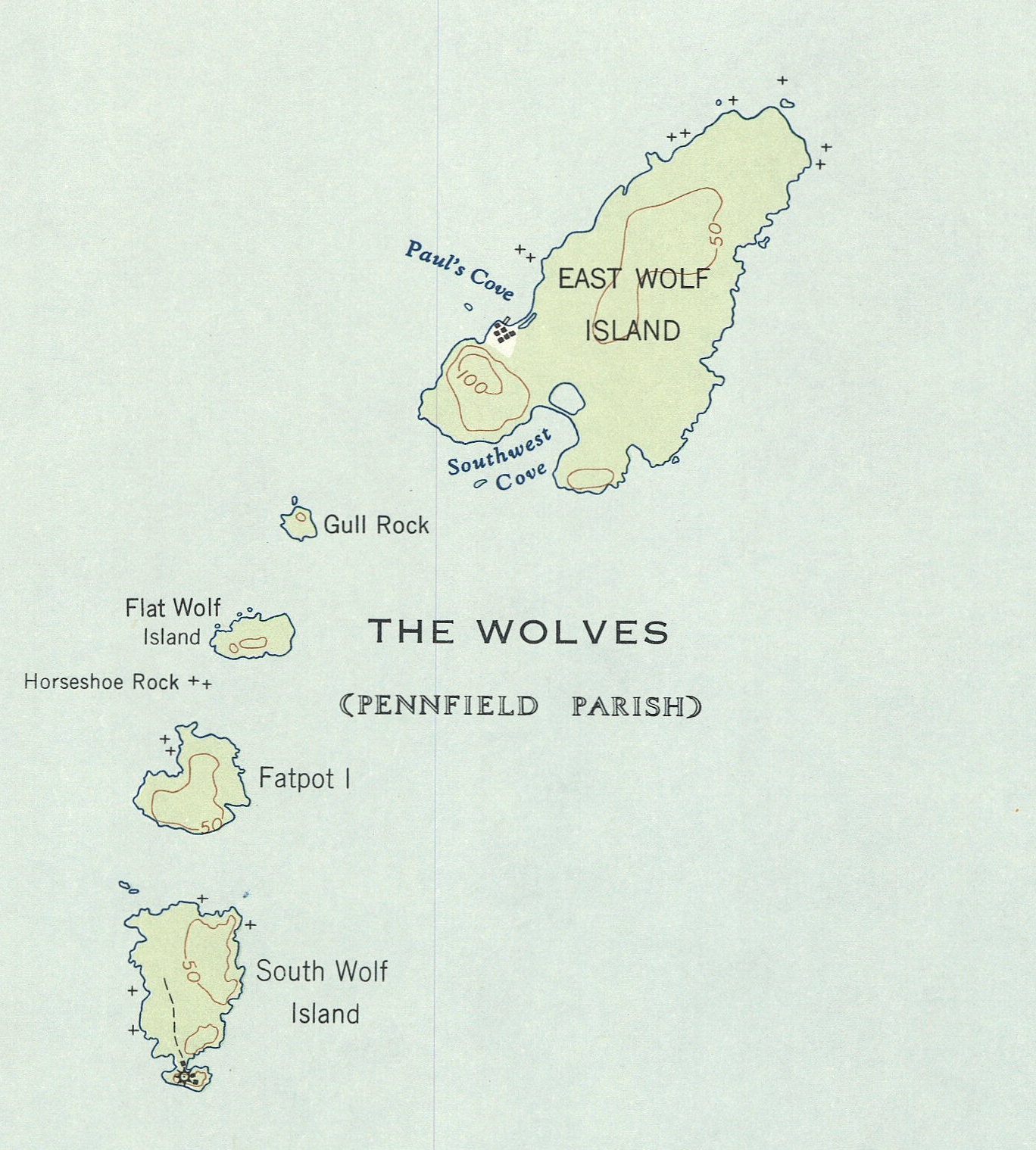
- Interactive map of The Wolves

Geography
- Location: Bay of Fundy
- Coordinates: 44°57′32″N 66°43′16″W

Administration
- Canada
- Province: New Brunswick
- County: Charlotte
- Parish: Pennfield Parish

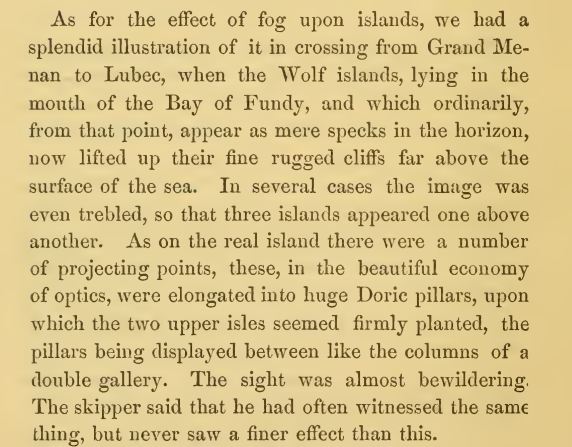
An 1878 description of a Fata Morgana mirage in the Wolf Islands.

The Wolves (or the Wolf Islands) are undeveloped, largely forested, islands in the Pennfield Parish of Charlotte County, New Brunswick, Canada in the Bay of Fundy. They are 60–100 feet (18–30 m) in height, "steep and bold", with deep passages between them ranging from 12 to 20 fathoms (72 to 120 ft; 22 to 37 m). They are sometimes named as the fourth of the major archipelagos that make up the Fundy Islands, alongside Campobello Island, Deer Island and Grand Manan.

It is considered a "Ecologically and Biologically Significant Area". A pond at Southwest Cove on East Wolf Island is the only source of freshwater.

== History ==
The islands have been identified as written about in the 1604 writings of Samuel Champlain and Sieur de Monts. William Francis Ganong notes the Iles aux Margos, "Gull Islands", referenced in the works of Samuel Champlain and appearing on his 1612 map of the region is a reference to the Wolves. Spotted in 1603 by Champlain, they were named Les Isles des Perdreaux. They became known for the frequency of shipwrecks.

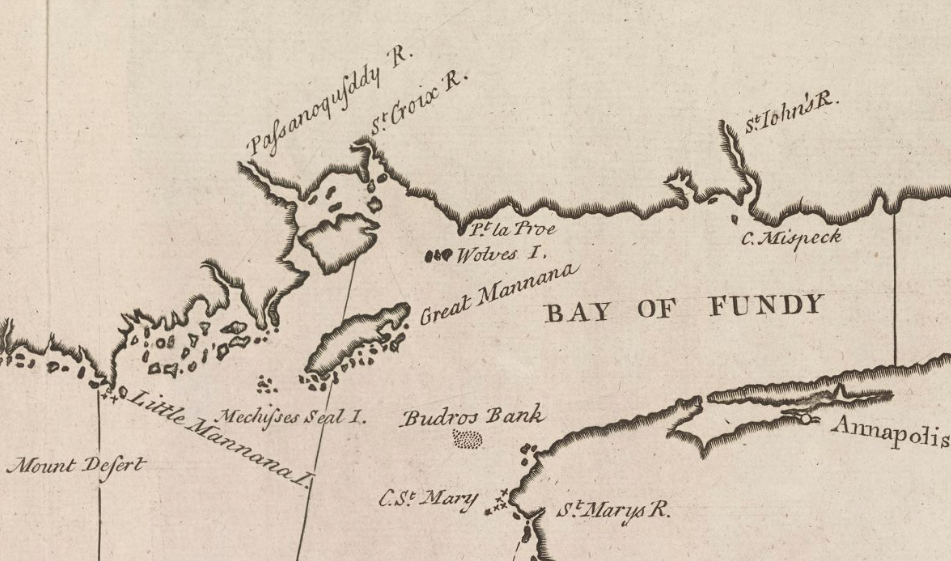
The Wolf Islands as it appears on Cyprian Southack's 1731 map.

In 1798, the islands were granted to Caleb Paul, who had married Joshua Knight's sister Priscilla and was the son of Quaker James Paul of Pennsylvania. As of 1851, the descendents of James Paul were still the only settlers living in the cluster of islands, after Joshua Paul had moved his family from St Andrews to Caleb's grant, while his wife was disowned by her family for marrying a Quaker.

In 1820, a British naval sloop was docked at Snug Cove, Campobello believed to be enforcing the territorial waters and the Plaster Laws meant to end the smuggling of Canadian gypsum to the United States. It sent a rowboat out toward the Wolf Islands where the British seamen fired two muskets at the Ploughboy moored there.

By 1854, the government was aware of "the need" to build a lighthouse on the islands, but progress was slow in following up on the report.

On May 21, 1863, Jesse Wright published notice that he had discovered the corpse of a disfigured British soldier with his hands cut off washed up on the coast of the Wolf Islands dressed in his military uniform as a 1st Battalion infantryman with the Bedfordshire and Hertfordshire Regiment 16th Regiment.

After the government built a lighthouse in 1871, without ascertaining ownership of the islands, Paul's ancestors who still claimed the islands demanded to be reimbursed by rent or purchase of the land being used.

In 1893, Wallace Matthews of Campobello was fishing off the Wolf Islands and picked up a message in a bottle which contained a poem written by the Paul family.

Together with nearby White Horse Island, it is one of the southernmost breeding kittiwake colony in the world.

In 1916, the schooner Harry T. under Captain George Lank lost its mast off the Wolf Islands.

In 1926, the Wolf Islands was noted as a central point of alcohol smuggling into the United States.

In 1934, the RCMP attended to the schooner Glacier in distress, struck by lightning SSW of the Wolves.

In August 1953, Captain Douglas Stultz reported catching tuna, uncommon in the area, on a rod near the Wolf Islands.

The Wolves have been "the scene of many shipwrecks", including the ship New England, which was wrecked on the Wolf Islands in 1872. In July 1981, the Fundy Thistle burned to a ruin off the Wolves.

As of 2003, Freeman Brown maintained weirs off the Wolf Islands.

There are six main islands, with their name suggested to have arisen from Passamaquoddy lore about the islands being likened to predators chasing nearby Deer Island.

The Wolf Islands have the distinction of being the subject of the longest continuous set of oceanographic data in Canada.

== East Wolf Island ==
The largest of the islands at 240 hectares (590 acres) and occasionally frequented by visitors from the mainland, East Wolf has been used for grazing cattle, pigs and chickens by its private owners including the Hazel family in the 1960s. Wild rabbits had been introduced multiple times, but with limited success. Three species of orchid grow on the island, Habenaria obtusata, Platanthera clavellata, and Neottia cordata.

In 1872, the steamership New England was wrecked on the East Wolf Island.

East Wolf Island also had a light and fog whistle buoy, with black and white stripes reading "WOLVES" with a radar reflector.

It has been prospected for gold.

As of 1988, the Hawkins family of Beaver Harbour owned East Wolf Island.

== Flat Wolf Island (Fatpot Island) ==
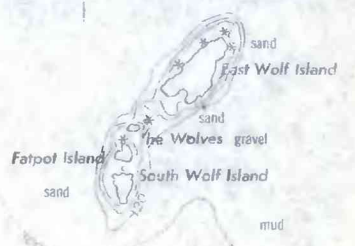
Fatpot Island, also known as Flat Wolf Island

In the summer of 1986, benthic algae sublittoral research stations were set up across the region including on Flat Wolf Island.

Flat Wolf Island was discovered to have monzodiorite but not tonalite, xenolite or quartz monzonite.

== Green Rock (Gull Rock) ==
Gull Rock has an "abrupt rocky shore" and little human activity, and a research trip showed no species of woody plants present, but 34 vascular plants.

Gull Rock was discovered to have monzodiorite but not tonalite, xenolite or quartz monzonite.

There is a deep water channel between Gull Rock and East Wolf Island approx 500m wide with ships advised to keep toward Gull Rock - whereas the channel between Gull Rock and Flat Wolf is only 200 metres and not advised due to dangers.

== Spruce Island ==
Spruce Island was discovered to have monzodiorite, xenolite and quartz monzonite but not tonalite.

== Southern Wolf Island ==
Southern Wolf Island has a lighthouse built in 1871, at which time it was tended by William Cline, who within two years was replaced with Edward Snell. By 1873, Snell hired labourers to construct a breakwater and wharf of his own volition, and was reimbursed half the cost by the government. In 1882 Snell was replaced by Ezra Munro, who served until Warren P. Davidson took over in 1897. Linwood Lord took over in 1903, followed by Ethelbert Wright in 1906, RJ Barry in 1916, GE Wright in 1917, H. Wright in 1918, FW Stanley in 1919, JF Babcock in 1920, CH Holmes from 1925 for over a decade, and later keepers included Harry Grey.

The lighthouse remained staffed until 1962–63, at which time it was replaced by a simple skeletal tower, prior to the 1982 construction of the current white 38-metre fibreglass automated light tower that runs only at night. In 2010, its lighthouse was declared "surplus" by the Department of Fisheries which no longer wished to maintain it.

From 1968-1969, researchers made three visits to South Wolf Island collecting dozens of flora specimens.

Following the donation of the island by Connors Brothers Limited in 2011, Southern Wolf Island functions as a 38-hectare nature preserve, administered by the Nature Trust of New Brunswick. In 2016, the island was one of the focuses of the Great Fundy Cleanup.

There is a geodetic triangulation station 50 metres southwest of the lighthouse.
