= White Horse Islet =

Island in New Brunswick, Canada

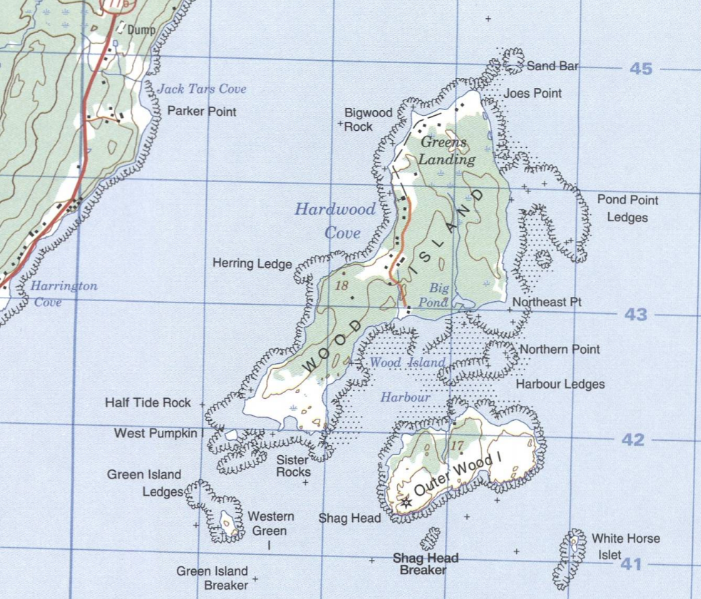
- Interactive map of White Horse Islet

Geography
- Location: Bay of Fundy
- Coordinates: 44°36′9″N 66°48′25″W

Administration
- Canada
- Province: New Brunswick
- County: Charlotte
- Parish: Grand Manan Parish

White Horse Islet is an undeveloped island in the Grand Manan Parish of Charlotte County, New Brunswick, Canada, where the Bay of Fundy.

It is a nesting place for cormorants, but lacks the cliff structure necessary for kittiwake breeding.

Sitting southeast of Little Wood Island, White Horse Islet has a steel navigation aid tower.

In 1943, a military plane Ventura GRV FN973 crashed from Pennfield Ridge, New Brunswick - and a rubber liferaft was found off White Horse with the body of L.H. Ledgingham who appeared to have escaped the initial wreckage but died at sea.

There are two dangerous sunken rocks off its edge.
