= Jouett's Island =

Island in New Brunswick, Canada

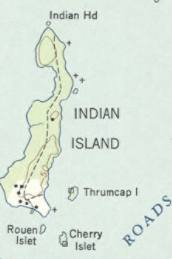
- Interactive map of Jouett's Island

Geography
- Location: Bay of Fundy

Administration
- Canada
- Province: New Brunswick
- County: Charlotte
- Parish: West Isles Parish

Jouett's Island (also called Thrumcap Island) is located off the southern coast of Indian Island, between the larger Campobello Island and Deer Island in Charlotte County, New Brunswick, Canada.

Jouett's Island is four acres consisting of soil over conglomerate, with a former mansion belonging to Captain Moses.

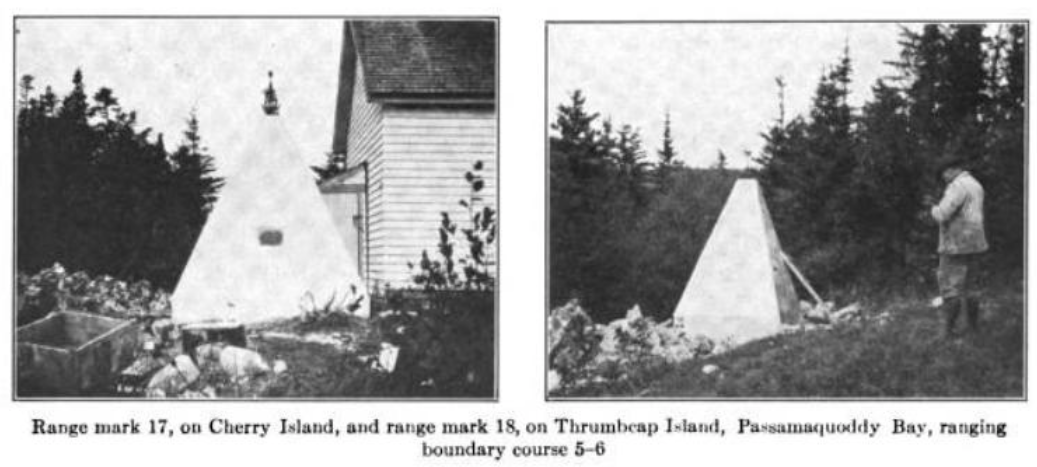
Geodetic trig points were installed on Cherry and Jouett's Islands by the International Border Commission.

C.H. Jouett had been reimbursed by the government for his construction of a "Bye Road" on Deer Island, in 1839.

In 1853, Comptroller and Customs Inspector Fitzgerald petitioned the government for reimbursement as he'd been required to move his Customs Office from Jouett's Island to Campobello.

In 1929, author Frances Gillmor published "Thumbcap Weir" which was set on a West Isles Parish, New Brunswick island titled "Deadman's Island" which was connected at low tide to a "Thumbcap" which held a herring weir. The island appears to have been modeled off Jouett's Island and Hospital Island and situated impossibly north of Spectacle Islands but south of White Horse Island.
