= English Island (New Brunswick) =

Island in New Brunswick, Canada

- Interactive map of English Island

Geography
- Location: Bay of Fundy

Administration
- Canada
- Province: New Brunswick
- County: Charlotte
- Parish: West Isles Parish

English Island (also called Hilyard Island) is a tidal island off the north-west edge of Deer Island in the West Isles Parish of Charlotte County, New Brunswick, Canada, where the Bay of Fundy enters Passamaquoddy Bay.

The few homes on the island belong to the descendants of Dr. Henry Frye, a prominent local physician tied to Hospital Island and Frye Island.

A small graveyard holds fewer than a dozen old graves of the English family.

In plans for a hydroelectric system built around a series of dams through the West Isles, it was proposed to connect English Island to both Deer Island and Pendleton Island in the second year of construction at a proposed cost of $565,000.
