= Hospital Island (West Isles) =

Island in New Brunswick, Canada

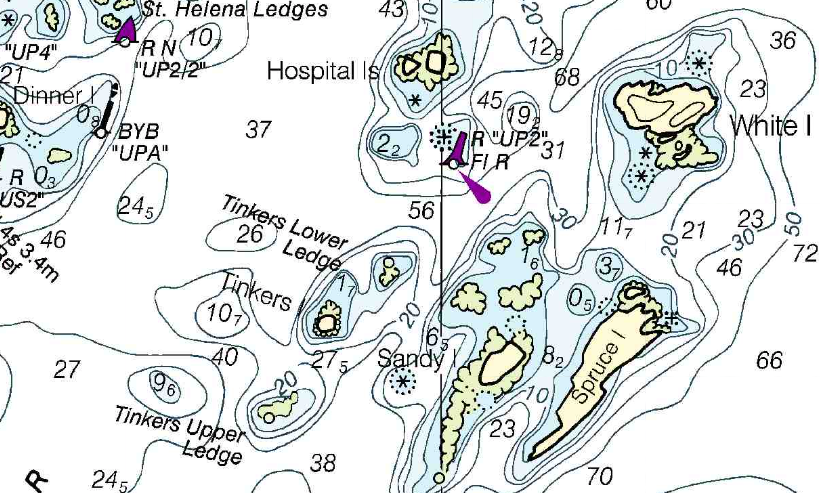
- Interactive map of Hospital Island

Geography
- Location: Bay of Fundy
- Coordinates: 45°7′15″N 67°0′41″W
- Area: 6–9.7 acres (2.4–3.9 ha)

Administration
- Canada
- Province: New Brunswick
- County: Charlotte
- Parish: West Isles Parish

Hospital Island is an undeveloped island in the West Isles Parish of Charlotte County, New Brunswick, Canada, where the Bay of Fundy enters Passamaquoddy Bay.

In December 1985, a study by Parks Canada assessed the island's value as $2,500.

A 1985 study confirmed the presence of a possible unnamed shipwreck off the southern edge of the island.

In 1929, author Frances Gillmor published "Thumbcap Weir" which was set on a West Isles Parish, New Brunswick island titled "Deadman's Island" which was connected at low tide to a "Thumbcap" which held a herring weir. The island appears to have been modeled off Jouett's Island and Hospital Island and situated impossibly north of Spectacle Islands but south of White Horse Island.

There is a red buoy marked UP2 just south of the Hospital Islands.
