= Indian Island (Bay of Fundy) =

Island in Charlotte County, New Brunswick, Canada

Native name: Misigne'goos Nickname: Sea-Nymph of the Bay
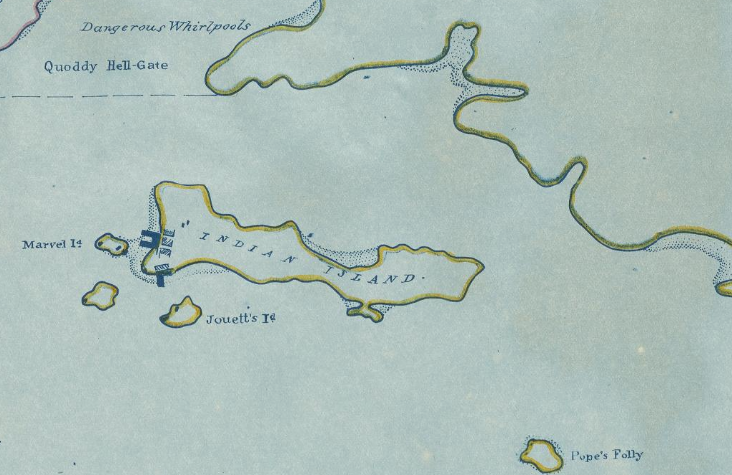
- An 1830 map showing Indian Island just east of what it dubbed the "Quoddy Hell Gate" in reference to the Old Sow whirlpool.
- Interactive map of Indian Island

Geography
- Location: Bay of Fundy
- Coordinates: 44°55′47″N 66°58′10″W
- Highest elevation: 30−33 m (-10 ft)

Administration
- Canada
- Province: New Brunswick
- County: Charlotte County

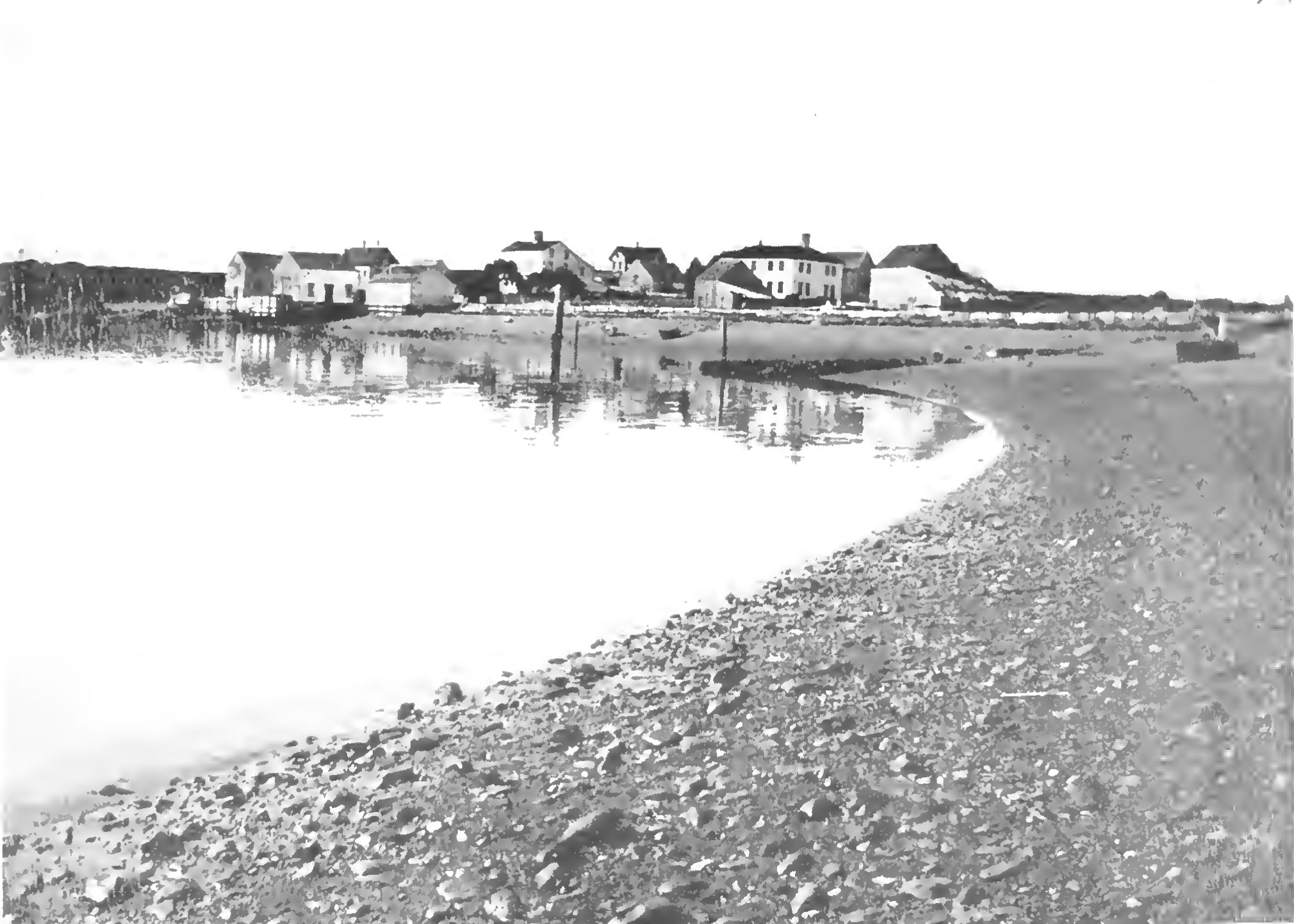
Indian Island

Indian Island is one of the Fundy Isles, sparsely populated in the West Isles Parish of the Bay of Fundy, New Brunswick, Canada that "was once an important trading depot". Approximately a mile long and comprising 150 acres, it is located between Moose Island, Deer Island and Campobello Island. Immediately to its south, there are three small rocky islets, Cherry Island, Jouett's Island and Marble Island.

== Name and geography ==
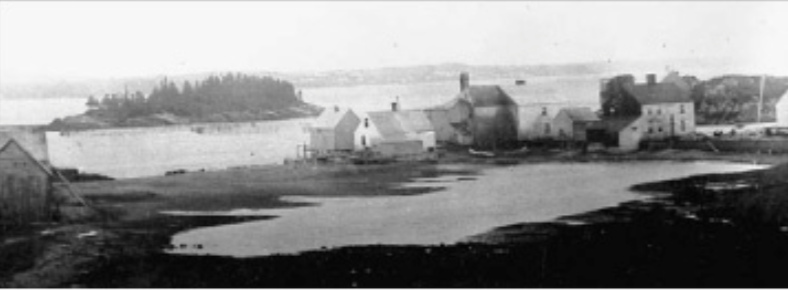
A pre-1900 photograph from Indian Island, showing Cherry Island on the left and Marble Island on the right; the white house in the centre is the Moses Residence.

It was historically called Fish Island, Perkins Island, St. Altereuil, Le Arterail Island, Lutteral, and finally Indian Island. In the Passamaquoddy-Maliseet language it has been called Jeganagoose, and Misik-Negus or Misigne'goos and its southwest corner is believed to host a burial ground for nearby indigenous tribes.

It is principally altered slate.

There is a historic cemetery on the island.

== History ==
Passamaquoddy natives settled on the island after being refused the right to return to St. Andrews, but remained only a few years before relocating back to the American and Canadian mainland. In 1795, judge David Owen drew a map of the Passamaquoddy Bay, identifying old French settlements including one at southern Indian Island.

The island was first known to be settled by the British goldsmith James Chaffey Sr. in 1760, who began trading for native furs. Chaffey himself suggested there may have been earlier French settlers on the island as he had seen the ruins of a stone chimney, and clearings in the woods for a European-style garden and linear planting of currants and berries. It has been speculated that the fort of Jean Serreau di St Aubin, known to have been built somewhere in the Passamaquoddy Bay but vacated in the years surrounding King William's War and Benjamin Church's 1704 expulsion of the French from the Bay, may have been situated on Indian Island.

In 1765, the island, under the name "Perkins Island", was granted to "The Canada Company" run by the Burton brothers out of New England. When they retired in 1776, they left it to Chaffey and he had a re-grant issued. By 1768, a man named John Fontaine, also known as John Fountain, moved to the island with his children; his daughter marrying Chaffey Sr.

In 1768, James Boyd of Newburyport published his legal intention to go into business with William Cheney and Joseph Connick in raising livestock on Indian Island, although there is not evidence they arrived despite an apparent Grant from Halifax possibly due to the influence of the American Revolutionary War, and ultimately Cheney was granted nearby Cheney Island in 1785. Boyd had previously built a home in May 1863 on Indian Island.

The third to settle on the island was Goldsmith, who together with Chaffey Sr. started a salt plant, boiling down ocean water. The Chaffey family remained closely associated with the island's development, James Chaffey Jr., "an aged man of much intelligence", having two wives and 19 children while carrying on his shipping business.

In autumn 1771, Captain Owen's ship Campobello Packet stopped at Cranberry Island, where his pilot Aaron Bunker "found his maiden sister bundled abed with the son of rather a wealthy settler on Deer Island [and] swore he would cut the gallant's throat if he did not repair the honour of the family by marrying his sister", leading Captain Owen to bring Eliachim Eaton and Mary Bunker to Indian Island where he had jurisdiction to marry them immediately.

Following Chaffey Sr.'s death in 1796, new settlers came to the island including Col. Thomas Wyer and Daniel McMasters from St.Andrews who established fish stores, John Wilson of Chamcook who traded in fish and lumber, as well as Mr. Freeman. Around 1811, Mr. Henderson who had previously been customs collector at Campobello was reassigned to start a Customs House at Indian Island in light of the flour and other goods being smuggled from the United States as they could earn $10–50 in a night of smuggling. On the second day of the War of 1812, three schooners were moored at Indian Island and a privateer ship approached sending out two smaller boats of armed men with the intent of capturing them. A delay by the armed men of the island allowed two schooners to slip their cables and beachthemselves, but Merritt's schooner tried to sail for St Andrews and was captured by the privateer.

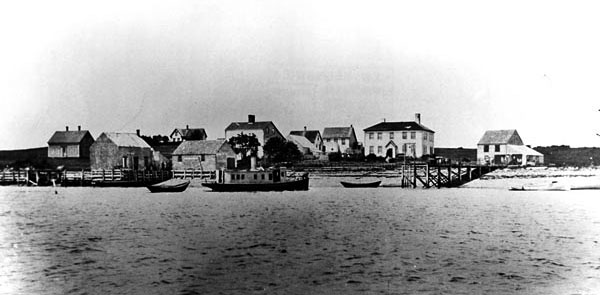
Indian Island, pre-1900

Following the war, Thomas Wyer was appointed Deputy Treasurer for West Isles & Campobello, with his office to be situated on Indian Island. He was succeeded by Richard Armstrong who built the large Customs House on Little Thrum Cap Islet, now named Jouett's Island for C.H. Jouett who came to occupy the same position overseeing cargoes of fish and lumber en route to the West Indies and returning with sugar, molasses and rum.

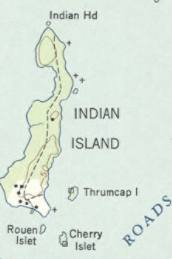
1954 chart of Indian Island

Around 1817, Mr. Townsend arrived from Saint John and opened a shipbuilding business, before moving to Chamcook to establish a shipyard. The island hit its peak population of approximately 100 residents in the 1820s, as a trading centre that rivaled St. Andrews.

In 1825, an auxiliary "Indian Island and Deer Island Bible Society" was formed, with Chaffey Jr. and shipbuilder William Babcock as founding members.

The island was aided by mail deliveries from Barlett's Counting Room on the island, via Captain Heney's schooner Rainbow connecting to Digby and Annapolis, as well as an unmanned lighthouse on Cherry Island and a Customs Office on Jouett's Island. At that time, there were 13 large West Indies trading vessels owned at Indian Island included J&J Chaffey's Queen of the Isles and Cavalier Jovett, "Indian Queen" and "Elizabeth Mary", J. Patterson's "Mary Stubbs" and "Eliza Ann", John McKenney's ""Lady Douglas" and "Lord of the Isles", Warren Hatheway's "Indian Chief", Ebenezer Scott's "Aeolus", Charles Guay's "Papoose", "Le'Aterail" and "Eugenia" However the opening of ports in the West Indies was disastrous to the island community and by 1849 it had no mercantile ships. Following the 1835 death of Chaffey Jr, the trading business declined sharply as 12 of 13 trading vessels left Indian Island, and the only remaining merchant vessel the Chaffey was wrecked in 1849. Focus turned to fishing.

In July 1861, J. E. Dixon of Indian Island was appointed as Collector and Treasurer for customs revenue for the West Isles and Campobello although the Thrum Cap customs house had collapsed and been replaced with one on the main island.

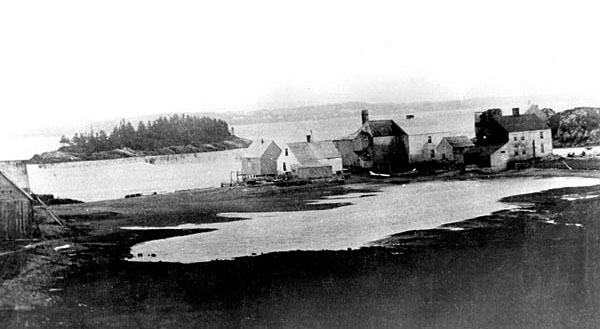
A photograph from Indian Island, facing towards Campobello

In April 1866, during the unsuccessful Fenian attempt led by Bernard Doran Killian to seize Campobello Island, a group of Irish-American militants crossed to Indian Island to demand Dixon surrender the British flag that flew over the Customs House. The militants returned on April 21 and set fire to four large storehouses at Guay's Wharf that contained liquor, tobacco, tea and salt. Some time thereafter, a third attempt was made by Fenians filling two large rowboats to infiltrate and attack inside the Fundy Isles but was spotted and repelled. On May 16, 1866 nine armed Fenians landed on Marble Island and took possession of Norwood's house until New Brunswick militia members dislodged them the following morning.

By 1866, the Penobscot maintained a small village of their own on Indian Island consisting of thirty wooden houses, a schoolhouse, townhall and Catholic church. Following Confederation, Indian Island remained a central hub serving as the sole polling station for the region including Grand Manan for at least four elections.

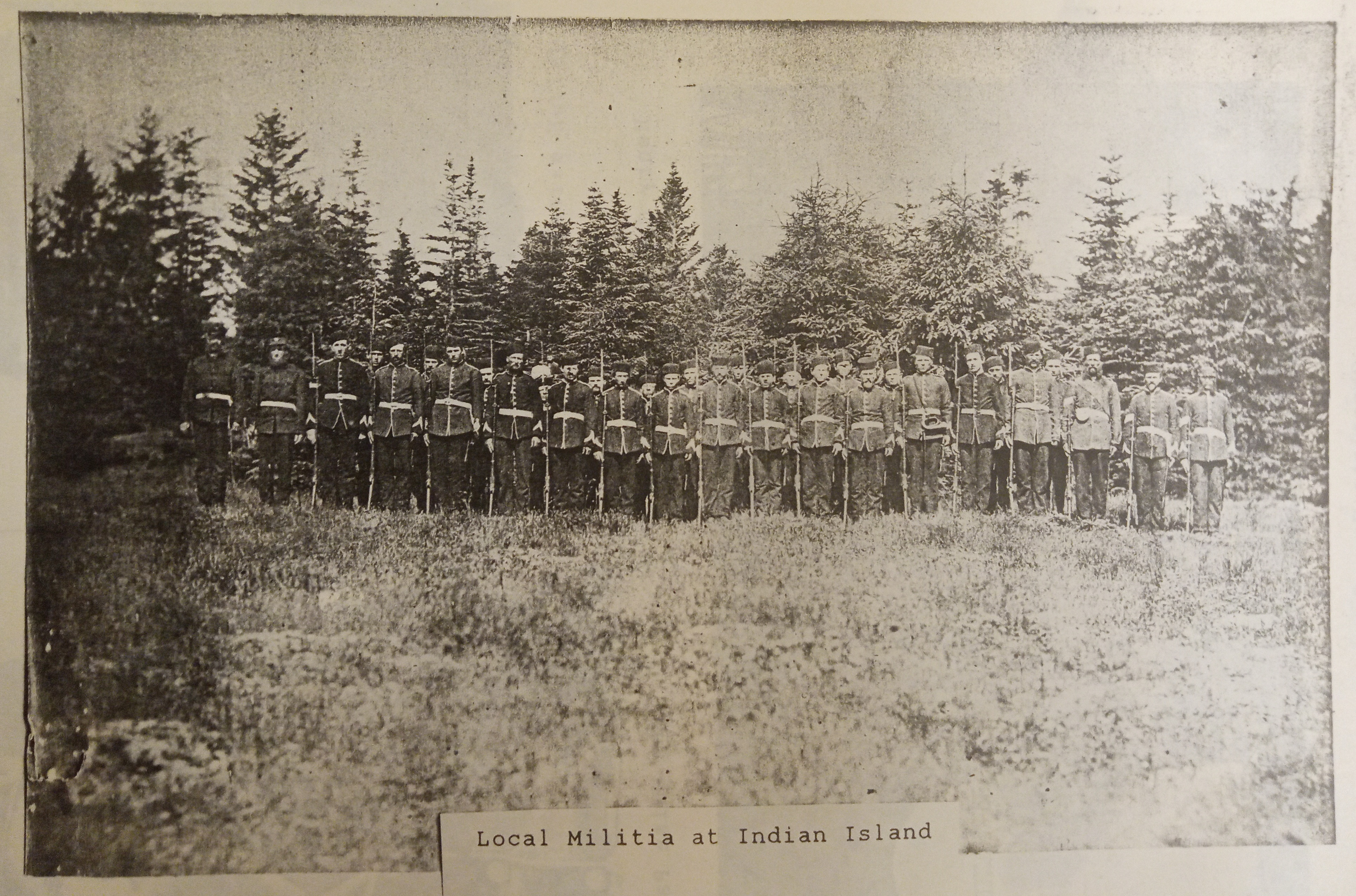
Indian Island was the muster site of the Charlotte County Militia.

On April 25, 1883, C.T. Williams "mysteriously disappeared" from indian Island causing his wife to seek notice of his potential whereabouts.

Southwestern New Brunswick smugglers in the late 18th century were "the overwhelming majority of the local political machinery, including the judiciary" - and a 1796 seizure found contraband tied to the "leading figures and magistrates" of Campobello, Grand Manan and Indian Island.

By 1915, Mendle Fountain's branch of John Fontaine's family line had moved to reside on Cherry Island.

The island was logged of its spruce and fir trees in 1957. On May 2, 1995 a 55' fishing boat from Deer Island sank off the coast of Indian Island, with all three crew rescued.

In 1998, the southeast corner of Indian Island was the site of only the second-ever find of a fossil from the rodentia Giant Beaver, a damaged upper-right incisor tooth.
