= Crow Island (New Brunswick) =

Island in New Brunswick, Canada

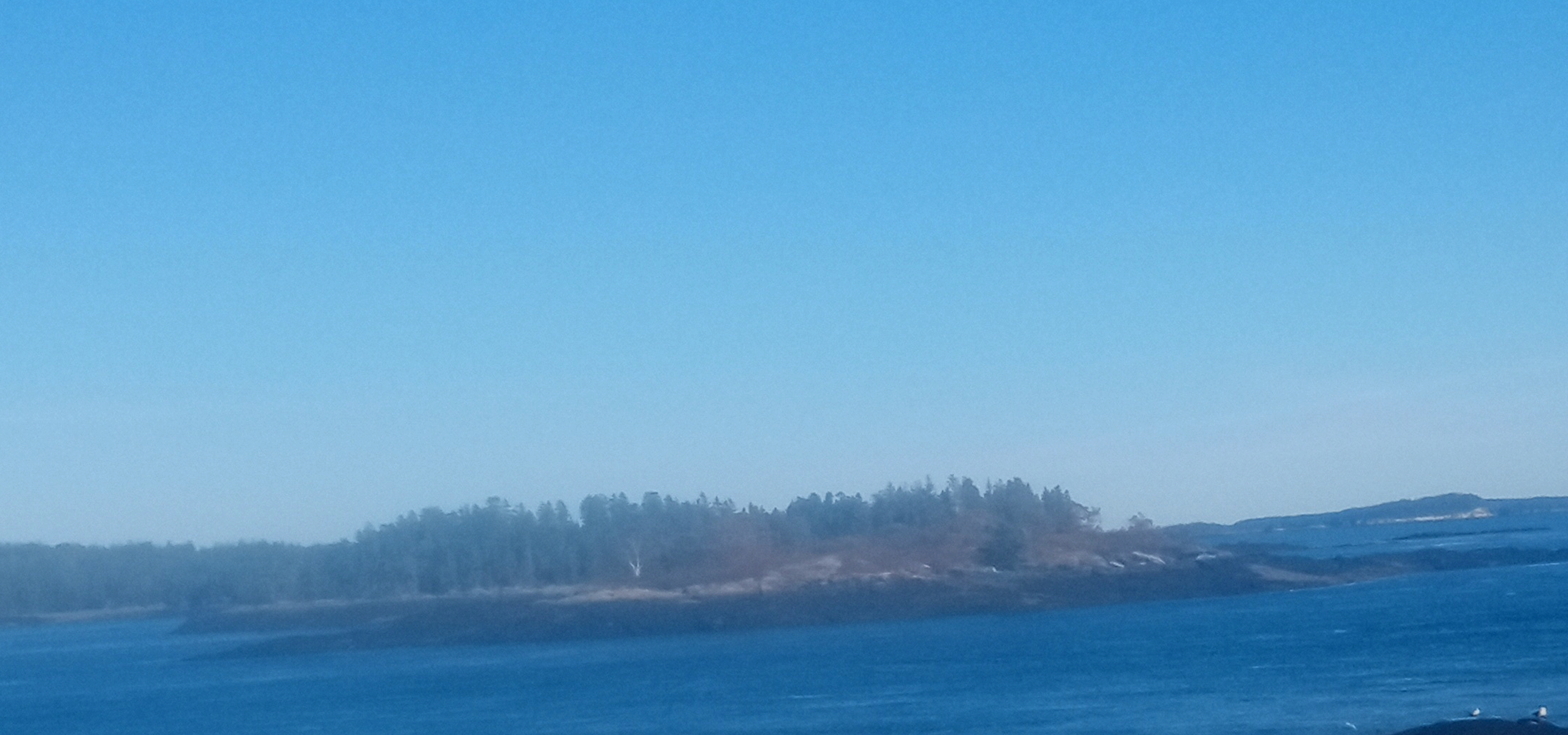
- Interactive map of Crow Island

Geography
- Location: Bay of Fundy
- Coordinates: 45°1′25″N 66°55′59″W

Administration
- Canada
- Province: New Brunswick
- County: Charlotte
- Parish: West Isles Parish

Crow Island is an undeveloped island in the West Isles Parish of Charlotte County, New Brunswick, Canada, where the Bay of Fundy enters Passamaquoddy Bay.

It is located off the east coast of Stuart Town, Deer Island, before the Partridge Islands. It is one the primary Integrated Multi-Trophic Aquaculture sites in the region, combining mussels and kelp - as well as 15 salmon cages under Cooke Aquaculture.

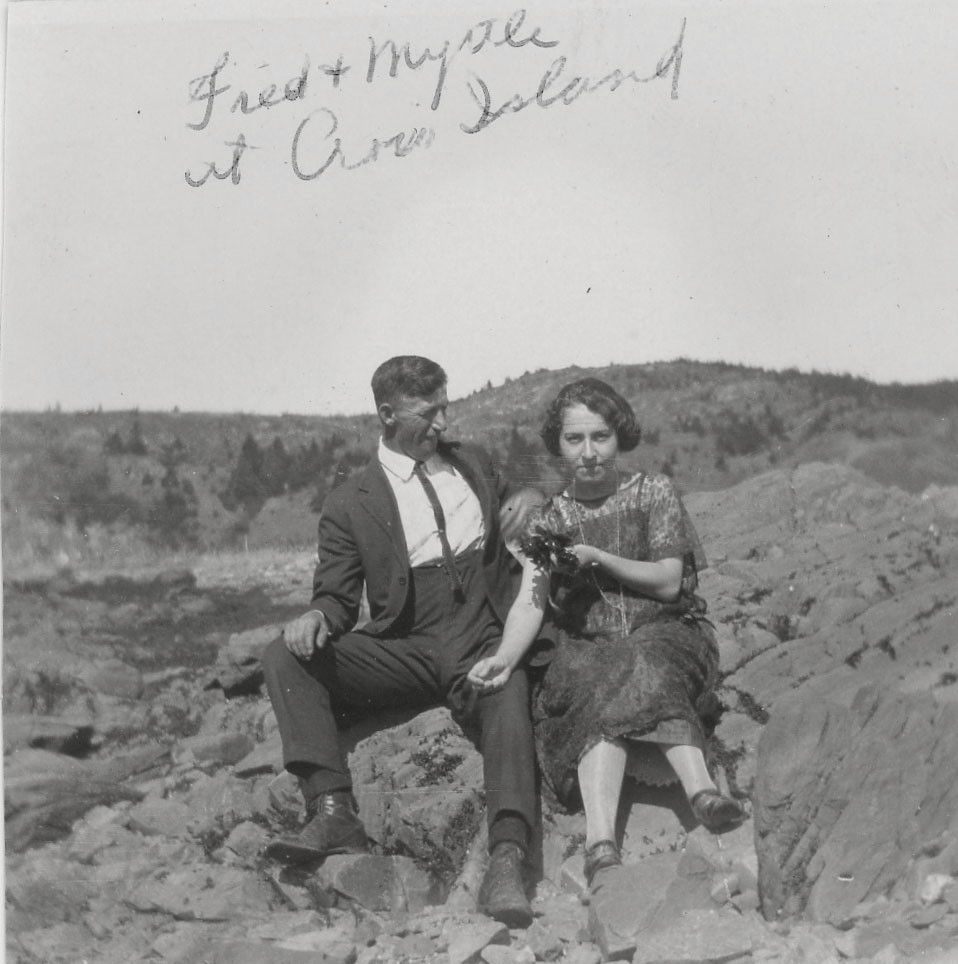
"Fred and Myrtle" on Crow Island

From at least 1910–1912, the family of Fred Lodge of Eastport, Maine wintered on Crow Island.

== Geography and composition ==
Jameson, Crow, Hardwood, Parker and Partridge Island are all share a land shelf north of Deer Island, where the waters are generally less than 10m below mean sea level in depth.
