= Long Island (Grand Manan) =

Island in New Brunswick, Canada

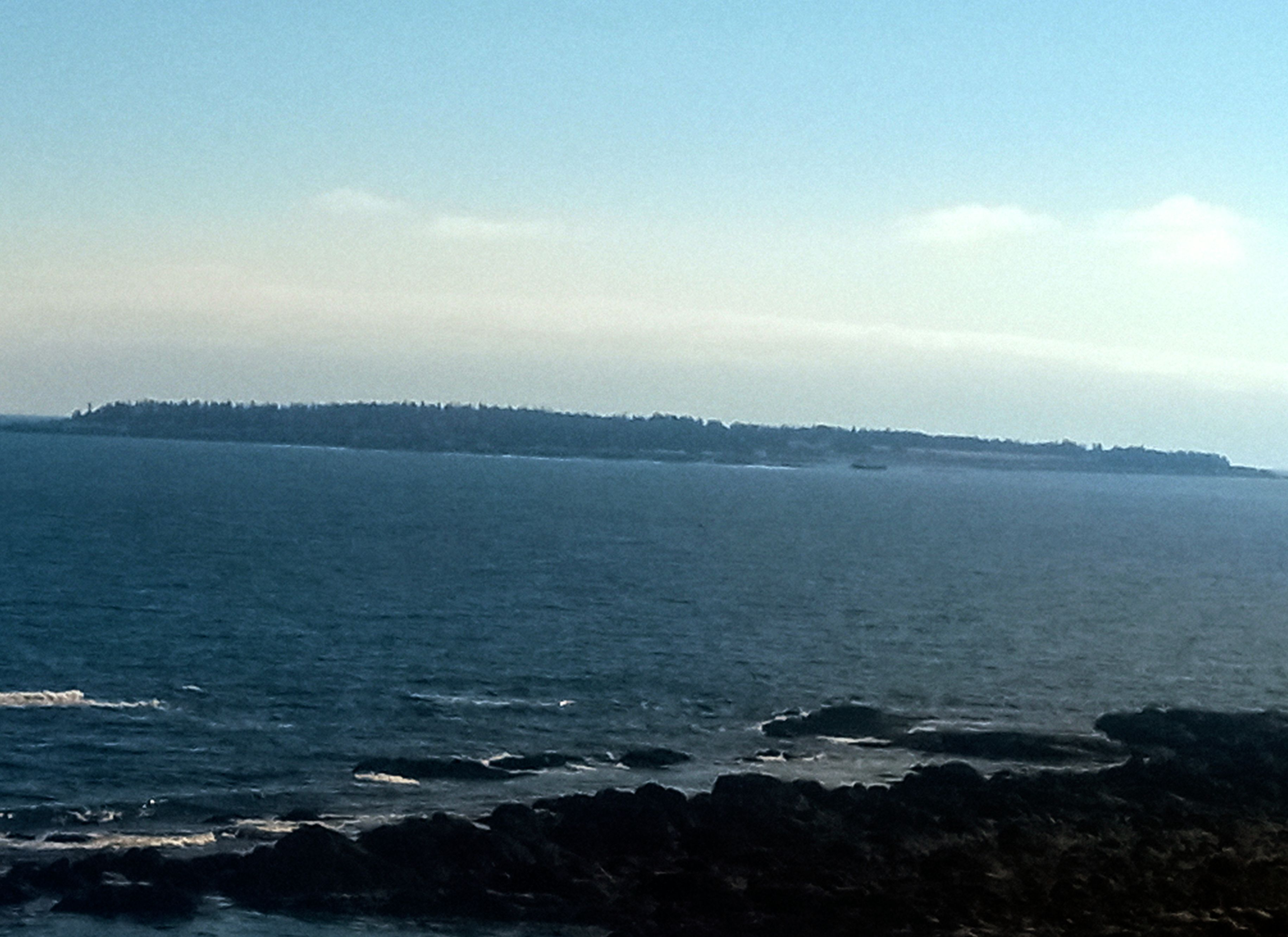
- Interactive map of Long Island

Geography
- Location: Bay of Fundy
- Coordinates: 44°43′48″N 66°43′18″W

Administration
- Canada
- Province: New Brunswick
- County: Charlotte
- Parish: Grand Manan Parish

Long Island is an island in the Grand Manan Parish of Charlotte County, New Brunswick, Canada in the Bay of Fundy.

Historically it had a smoked herring industry based on the island, but it no longer exists.

Privately owned, with a flock of sheep on it, the island has salmon aquaculture sites off its west side.

Part of the island is held by the Nature Trust of New Brunswick.

In September 1840, the barque "Clarence" was driven onto Long Island but salvagable. In August 1849, the barque Clarence Lawrence was wrecked on Long Island in heavy fog, though the crew were saved.
