= Monzodiorite =

Monzodiorite is an intrusive rock with a composition intermediate between diorite and monzonite. It is defined in the QAPF classification as coarse-grained igneous rock in which quartz makes up 0% to 5% of the QAPF mineral fraction, plagioclase makes up 65% to 90% of the total feldspar content, and the plagioclase is sodium-rich (%An < 50).
