= Duck Islands (Grand Manan) =

Island in New Brunswick, Canada

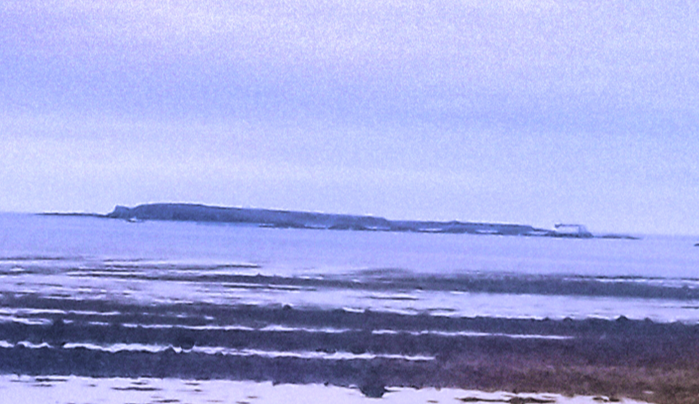
- High Duck Island with Low Duck Island slightly visible behind it, as viewed from the Castalia Salt Marsh
- Interactive map of Duck Islands

Geography
- Location: Bay of Fundy

Administration
- Canada
- Province: New Brunswick
- County: Charlotte
- Parish: Grand Manan Parish

The Duck Islands are in the Grand Manan Parish of Charlotte County, New Brunswick, Canada in the Bay of Fundy.

There are three Duck Islands, Great Duck Island is the largest, with provincially-owned Low Duck and High Duck Islands to the north of it.

== Low Duck and High Duck Island ==
Low Duck Island's highest elevation is 4.6m, while High Duck Island's is 18m. Low Duck Island has Brent goose populations.

In 1804, Wilfred Fisher purchased High Duck Island to start a smoked herring business before expanding to Woodward's Cove, where he retained the title "King of Duck Islands".

In 1831, John Ross was given both islands in a land grant by the Crown.

As of 1866, there was a small fishing community made up of three families residing on High Duck Island. In approximately 1870, Alexander Fisher, grandson of Squire Fisher, left Eastport to establish a poultry business with chickens, ducks and geese on High Duck Island.

The islands are owned by the Government of New Brunswick, and Class II Protected Natural Areas.

== Great Duck Island ==
The highest elevation on Great Duck Island is on its south end, and it slopes down toward the north. A submarine power cable runs from the south end of the island to Ross Island.

In the 1880s, residents of Grand Manan sent a petition to Ottawa seeking a fog whistle on Great Duck Island, so in 1884 Parliament appropriated the land and awarded a $2,070 tender to G. S. Mayes to build the fog alarm, a small keeper's dwelling and boathouse. Samuel G. Dinsmore was appointed the engineer to oversee the fog alarm. In 1892, federal funds were used to expand the property. In 1916, the foghorn was replaced with a diaphone sounding for four seconds, every 45 seconds and a lifesaving crew was stationed on the island. In 2010, its lighthouse was declared "surplus" by the Department of Fisheries which no longer wished to maintain it.

Today there is a 16.5m light station on the south end of the island, as well as a microwave tower.

As of 1923, Great Duck Island had a buoy associated with the island.

Keepers: Keepers: Samuel G. Dinsmore (1886 – 1906), Rupert Burnham (1906 – 1914), Manfred L. Daggett (1915 – 1916), Chick S. Stanley (1917 – 1922) Clayton E. Small (1922 – at least 1937), Jack Russell (at least 1974 – 1984).
