= Duck Islands (Campobello) =

Island in New Brunswick, Canada

- Interactive map of Duck Islands

Geography
- Location: Bay of Fundy
- Coordinates: 44°50′30″N 66°57′43″W

Administration
- Canada
- Province: New Brunswick
- County: Charlotte
- Parish: Campobello Parish

The Duck Islands are in the Campobello Parish of Charlotte County, New Brunswick, Canada in the Bay of Fundy., southwest of Campobello Island.

Described as rocky with stunted fir trees, they are the base for fishing weirs and a number of shoals, ledges and long flats reach out toward Campobello.

There is a geodetic triangulation station on the largest, innermost, Duck Island.

In August 2024, searches for a deceased paddleboarder centered around the Duck Island ledges.
