= White Horse Island =

Island in New Brunswick, Canada

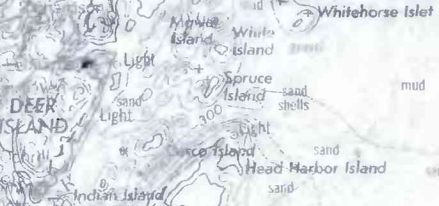
- Interactive map of White Horse Island

Geography
- Location: Bay of Fundy
- Coordinates: 44°59′31″N 66°52′18″W
- Area: 3 acres (1.2 ha)

Administration
- Canada
- Province: New Brunswick
- County: Charlotte
- Parish: West Isles Parish

White Horse Island (formerly Penguin Hors) is an undeveloped island in the West Isles Parish of Charlotte County, New Brunswick, Canada, where the Bay of Fundy enters Passamaquoddy Bay. It is provincially a Protected Natural Area.

The island is considered bare and rocky, 68' high It is considered a "Ecologically and Biologically Significant Area" and is administered by the Stewardship branch of the Department of Natural Resources. It is a Class 1 Protected Area, closed to the public.

Its name is a bastardization of "Penguin [White Head] Hors", meaning it was the Outward White Head Island. In the summer of 1986, benthic algae sublittoral research stations were set up across the region including on White Horse.

There is a geodetic triangulation station placed in 1863, which appeared to have disappeared by 1913. Ernest Ingersoll wrote about it being the entrance to Campobello, by steamship.

In 1929, author Frances Gillmor published "Thumbcap Weir" which was set on a West Isles Parish, New Brunswick island titled "Deadman's Island" which was connected at low tide to a "Thumbcap" which held a herring weir. The island appears to have been modeled off Jouett's Island and Hospital Island and situated impossibly north of Spectacle Islands but south of White Horse Island.

== History ==
The island has been identified as one of those written about in the 1604 writings of Samuel Champlain and Sieur de Monts.

Its original grant was to Samuel Bliss, who was also granted the Bliss Islands.

In December 1985, a study by Parks Canada assessed the island's value as $2,400.

Scallop-draggers turned up a slate ulu-knife.

In 1987 a two-seater plane went down in the ocean just south of White Horse Island, killing brothers Seldon and Prescott Smith. Its wreckage was only recovered seven years later when it became entangled in fishing nets.

== Flora and fauna ==
The island functions as a cormorant rookery.

Together with the nearby Wolf Islands, it is one of the southernmost black-legged kittiwake breeding colonies in the world. Nesting was first observed on the island in 1998. The presence of the colony was an important factor in the island's being declared a class 1 preserve in the New Brunswick Provincial Natural Areas (PNA) system.

As of 2008 it was the only northern gannet breeding site in the Bay of Fundy. Gannets were observed nesting there in 1990 for the first time since 1880.

Atlantic puffins were observed nesting on the island in 1999.

Researchers visiting the island prior to 1969 found that Ambrosia artemisiifolia (common ragweed) was one of the dominant flora.
