= Mohawk Island (New Brunswick) =

Island in New Brunswick, Canada

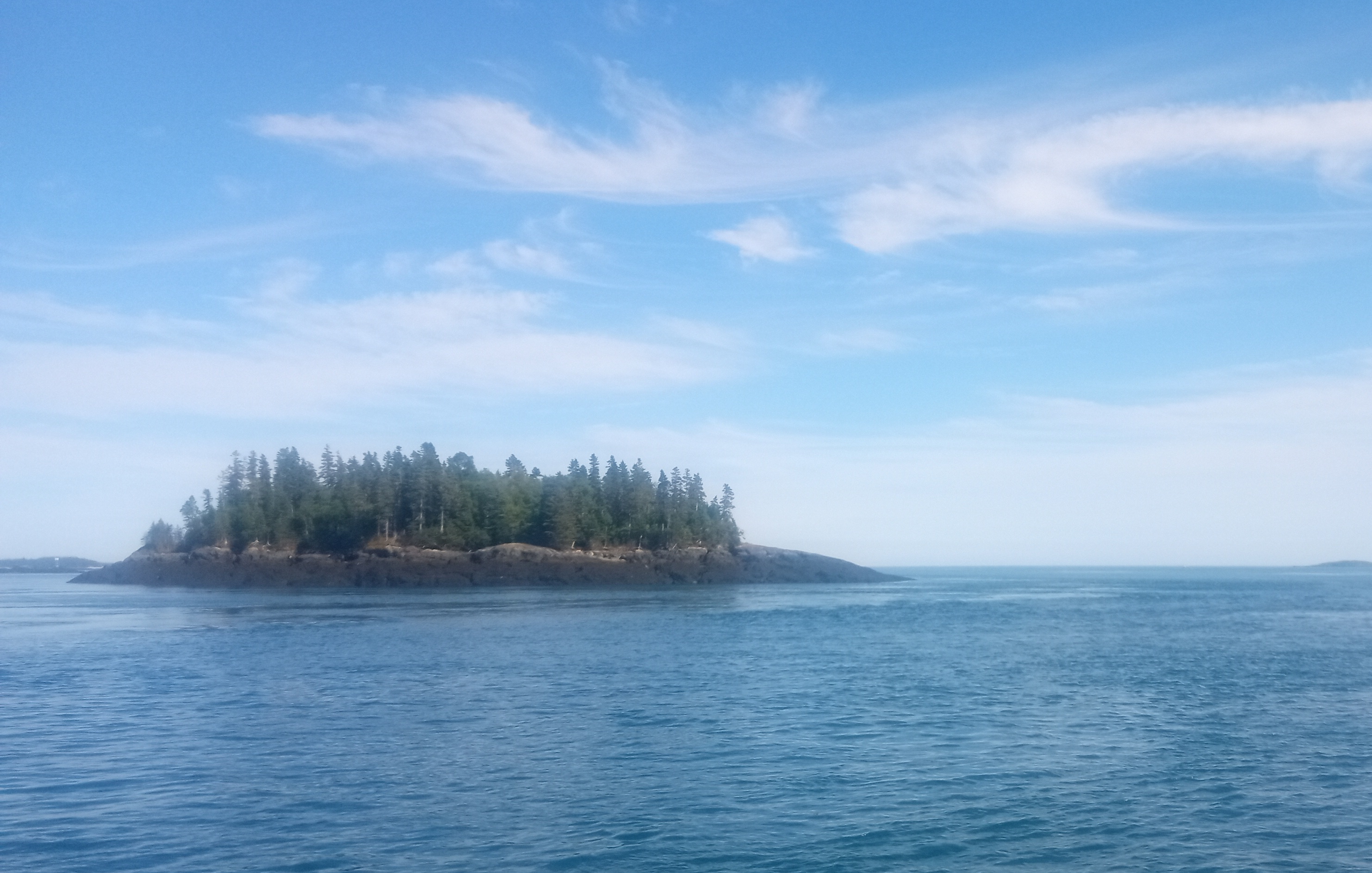
- Interactive map of Mohawk Island

Geography
- Location: Bay of Fundy
- Coordinates: 45°2′17″N 66°54′15″W
- Highest elevation: 22 m (72 ft)

Administration
- Canada
- Province: New Brunswick
- County: Charlotte
- Parish: West Isles Parish

Mohawk Island is an undeveloped island in the West Isles Parish of Charlotte County, New Brunswick, Canada, where the Bay of Fundy enters Passamaquoddy Bay.

In the summer of 1986, benthic algae sublittoral research stations were set up across the region including on Mohawk Island.
