= Bar Island (New South Wales) =

Island in the Hawkesbury River, New South Wales, Australia

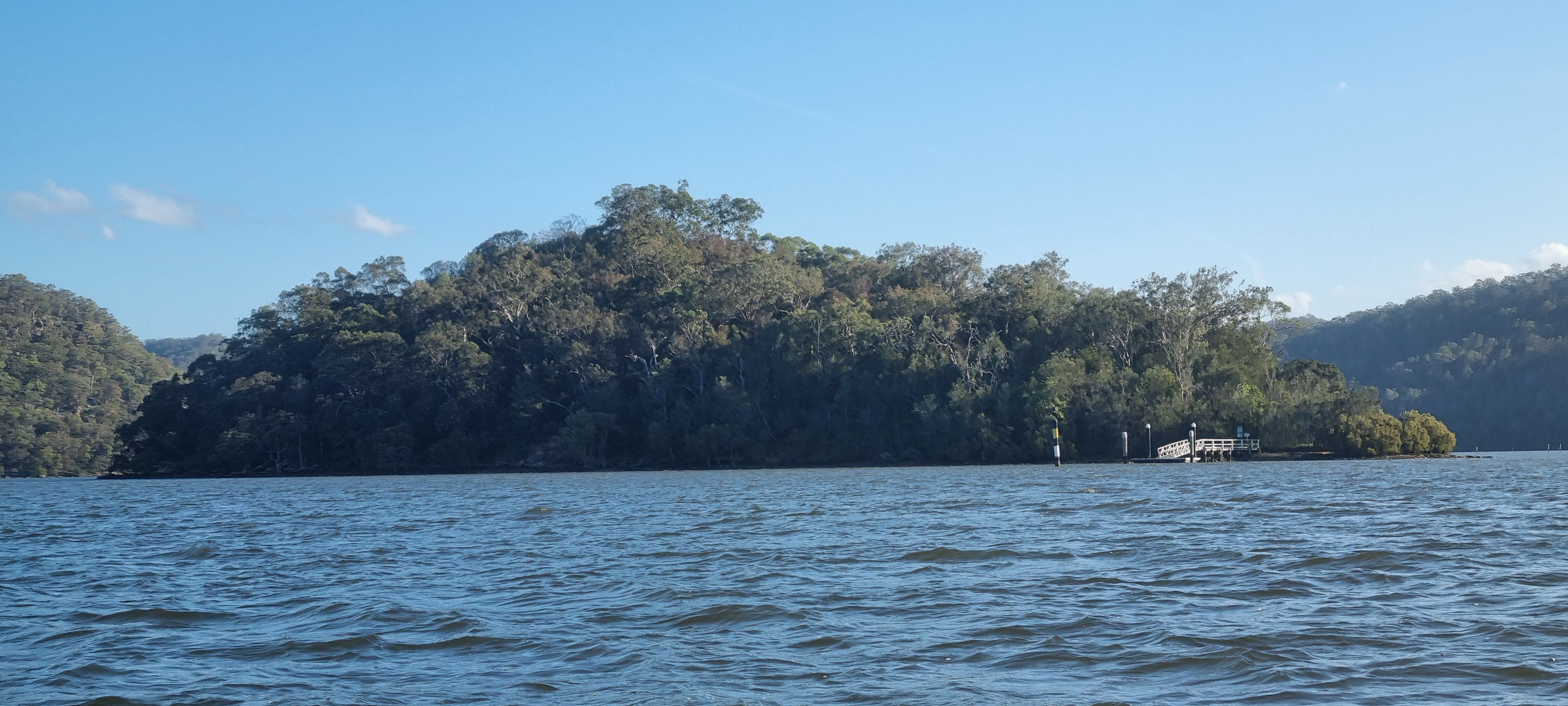
- View of the North-East side of Bar Island
- Interactive map of Bar Island

Geography
- Location: Berowra Waters, Hawkesbury River
- Coordinates: 33°31′35″S 151°9′11″E
- Highest elevation: 20 m (70 ft)

Administration
- Australia
- State: New South Wales

Demographics
- Population: 0

Bar Island (previously called Goville Island) is an uninhabited island located near Berowra Waters in the Hawkesbury River on the Central Coast of New South Wales, Australia. The island is located near Bar Point and is part of the Hornsby Shire local government area.

The name Bar Island may refer to the submerged sandbar which separates the north of the island from the mainland.

== Transport ==
There are no scheduled public transport services to the island. It can only be accessed by private boat, kayak, or water taxi. There is a public jetty maintained by the Hornsby Shire Council. The nearest public road is 6 kilometres (3.7 mi) downstream in Mooney Mooney.

== Aboriginal History ==
It is believed that the island was once a meeting place for the Dharug, Guringai, and Darkinjung people. Near the wharf is a shell midden.

== Church ==
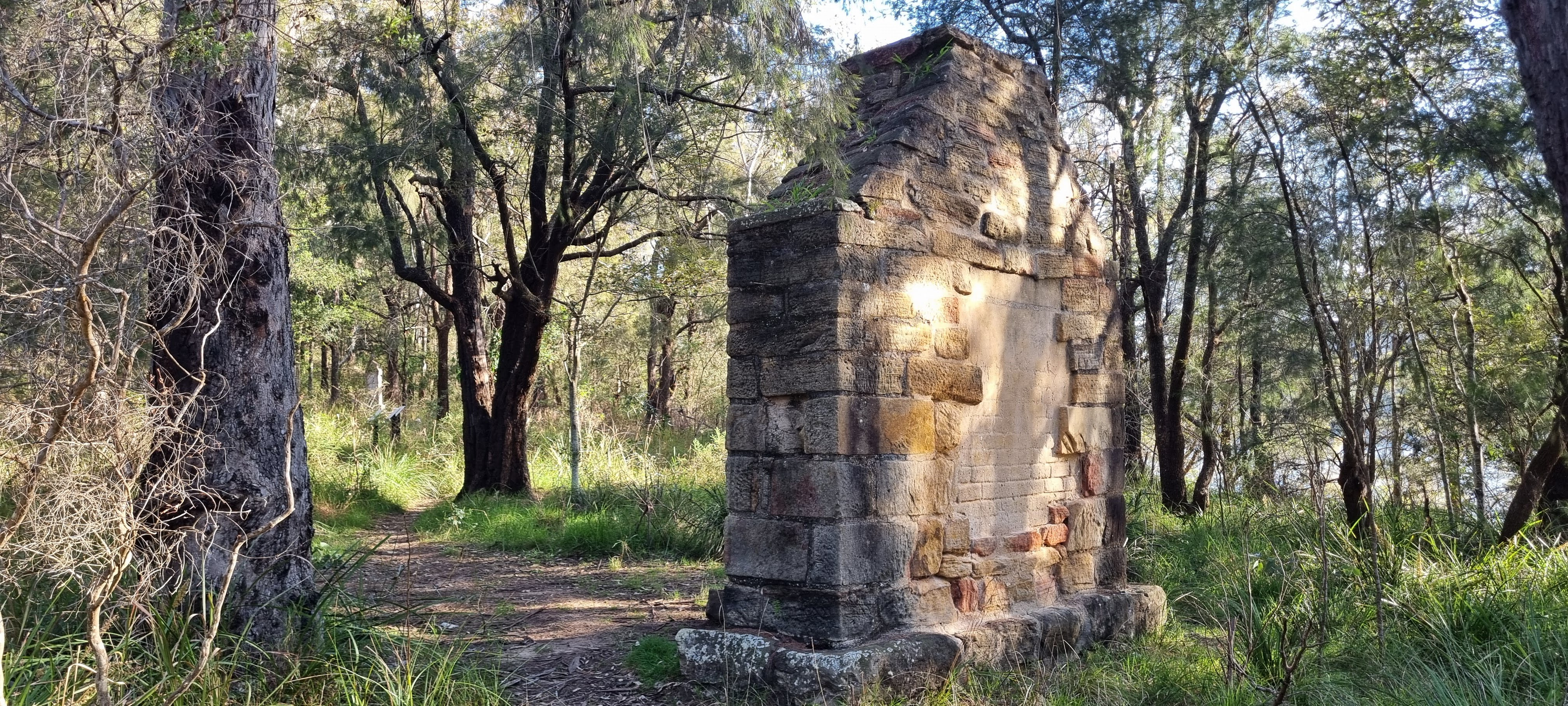
The church's fireplace, the only remaining structure

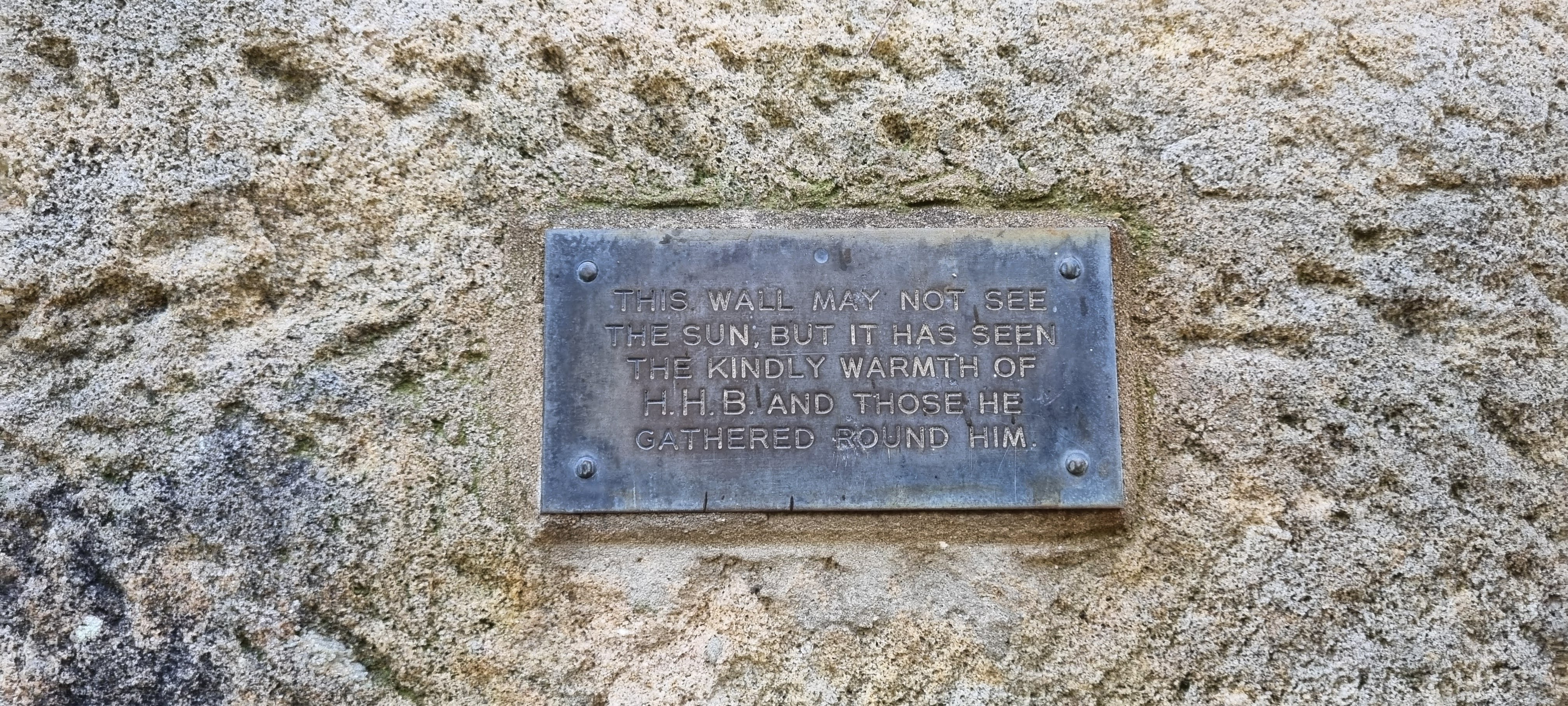
A plaque affixed to the ruin of the church, commemorating the church minister H.H. BRITTEN

An anglican church opened in 1876. The church building was also used by a half-time school between 1877-1892 and 1901–1903, known as Bar Point School. The building was destroyed by a bushfire in 1906, and only the stone fireplace remains. A cottage for the Church's groundskeeper was also build in circa 1875, and remained until 1915. Near the church is a slab of sandstone inscribed with H.E. BRITTEN, who is believed to have been the son of the church's minister.

== Cemetery ==
A cemetery with over 58 graves has existed since at least 1879, and it is believed that the last burial was in 1906.

Beyond the cemetery is a modern memorial installed in 1963, which commemorates J.O. Sandell and M.J. Buckman. They were instructors from Outward Bound who drowned while trying to rescue students from the Hume Weir in Albury.

== See also ==
- Media related to Bar Island at Wikimedia Commons
- Islands of New South Wales
