= Hospital Island (St. Andrews) =

Island near Saint Andrews, New Brunswick, Canada

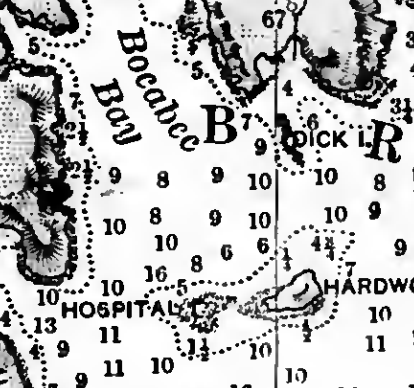
- Hospital Island and Hardwood Island, in an 1889 chart
- Interactive map of Hospital Island

Geography
- Location: Bay of Fundy
- Coordinates: 45°07′15″N 67°00′41″W

Administration
- Canada
- Province: New Brunswick
- County: Charlotte County

Hospital Island (previously Little Hardwood Island) is a small three-acre (12,000 m^{2}) island in the Passamaquoddy Bay located northeast of Saint Andrews, New Brunswick. In 1842 it was established as a quarantine port for newcomers to the region, predominantly Irish emigres fleeing the potato famine, with an estimated 400 patients having died on the island. The buildings and burial ground spread over 20% of the island's surface.

== Quarantine station ==
In 1832, a ship offloaded newcomers with Asiatic Cholera, leading to the demand for a quarantine island to be transferred to the Justices of Charlotte. On April 11–12, the Sessions of Charlotte County passed the resolution the island would be made a quarantine station and to finish construction on "the pest house" extant on the island. By May 1, the brig Susan put ashore to quarantine its Irish newcomers. At this time, the concern was smallpox.

In 1841, Boyd brought a petition from James Allanshaw seeking to authorise the sale of Hospital Island and a new piece of land purchased for a hospital.

When typhus became the main concern, by February 1842, a ship of European immigrants brought an epidemic of cholera, highlighting the need for a new quarantine station. Officials were further concerned since the local population depended on the many islands in the bay for their livelihood, and an earlier scare with cholera eight years earlier had seen the much larger 130-acre (0.53 km^{2}) Navy Island, then dubbed Saint Andrews Island, transmit the disease to the mainland. Little Hardwood Island, as Hospital Island was then known, was chosen for being distant from the mainland and of no apparent use, with the island having been dubbed a "miserable lump of reddish sand" and "the most worthless island" in the area at the time. Its trees were cut, and the first facility built which measured 49 by 26 feet (15 by 8 m).

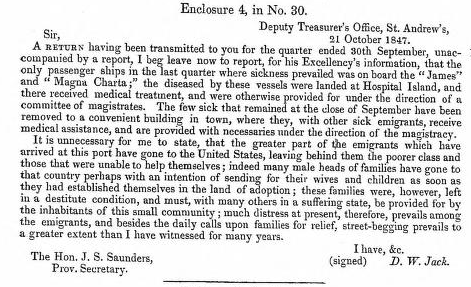
1847 letter from D. W. Jack, staffed on Hospital Island

On June 3 1847, the Elizabeth Grimmer was ordered to hold her 229 passengers at Hospital Island,

In July 1847, the ship Magna Charta disembarked its passengers at Hospital Island, and the St. Andrews Standard reported that of 77 passengers, 10 had managed to escape the ship, 30 were sick with cholera, and two adults and two children had recently died. A second, larger, facility on the island was also built in 1847 which was 59 by 26 feet (18 by 8 m) and two storeys plus a basement. A separate home was built for the island doctor, an island keeper's residence, a shed and it was furnished with a sailboat for their use. The original structure was relegated to overflow usage during busy summer months. Dr. Samuel Frye, who had been involved with the earlier failed quarantine station at Navy Island and also ran a quarry on Cailiff Island, died serving at Hospital Island in 1847.

In 1848, Margaret Baldwin, the widow of Thomas Baldwin, and Margaret Tufts, the widow of Benjamin Tufts, made successful petitions to the New Brunswick courts for financial assistance as their husbands had been employed on the island and died of typhus. In 1848, the barque Star again landed its Irish emigrants on Hospital Island, where 48 of them died and were buried. The chief Emigration Officer James Boyd travelled to the island in August 1848 to "break up the establishment at Hospital Island", taking away the final twelve residents to stay at a nearby farm.

The Susan brought Irish emigres in 1849 and 1850.

In 1857, the Health Board again petitioned to close the Hospital Island station and purchase more suitable land on a different island to serve as quarantine. In 1859, the island's chief keeper Lachlan Hanlyn died of jaundice.

In 1865, the Saint Croix Courier reported that the steamship Atlantic, arriving from Brest, France, saw 50 to 60 cholera cases develop on Hospital Island wherein 15 died.

Hospital Island was viewed but not visited, for the 1870 geological survey of the region.

== Legacy ==
In 1995, a stone Celtic cross memorial facing Hospital Island was erected on the mainland Saint Andrews, as a tribute to the Irish immigrants who died while being quarantined there. It is unclear whether the island has been used as a burial site for patients who died during quarantine.

By 1997, the island had been privately owned by George Matthews who, as well as cultural association members, had previously failed to find human remains. No portion of the historic buildings remain, and the island is now privately operated as a bird sanctuary.
