= White Head Island =

Island in New Brunswick, Canada

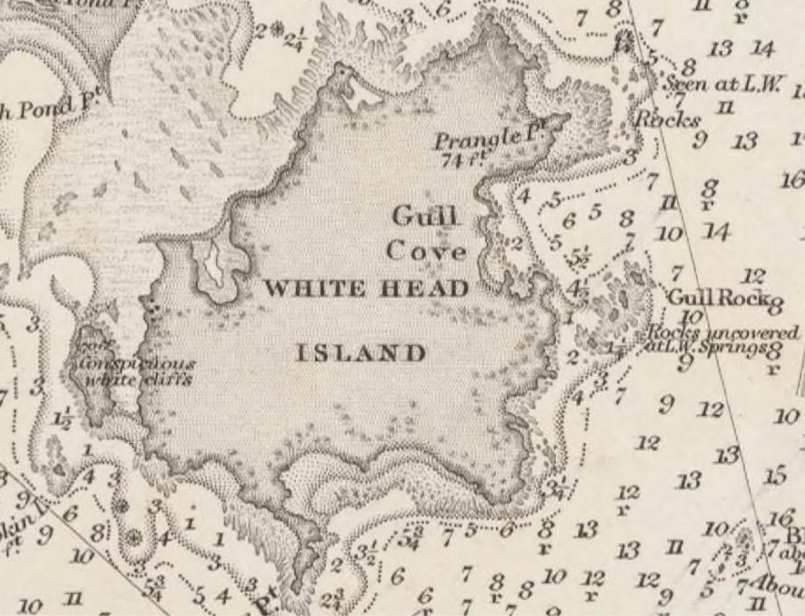
- An 1855 chart showing White Head Island.

- Location within New Brunswick

Geography
- Location: Bay of Fundy
- Coordinates: 44°37′52.6″N 66°42′28.63″W
- Archipelago: Grand Manan Archipelago
- Area: 5.96 km^{2} (2.30 sq mi)
- Highest elevation: 59 m (194 ft)

Administration
- Canada
- Province: New Brunswick
- County: Charlotte
- Parish: Grand Manan Parish

Demographics
- Population: 139 (2021)
- Pop. density: 23.3/km^{2} (60.3/sq mi)
- Long Point Lighthouse
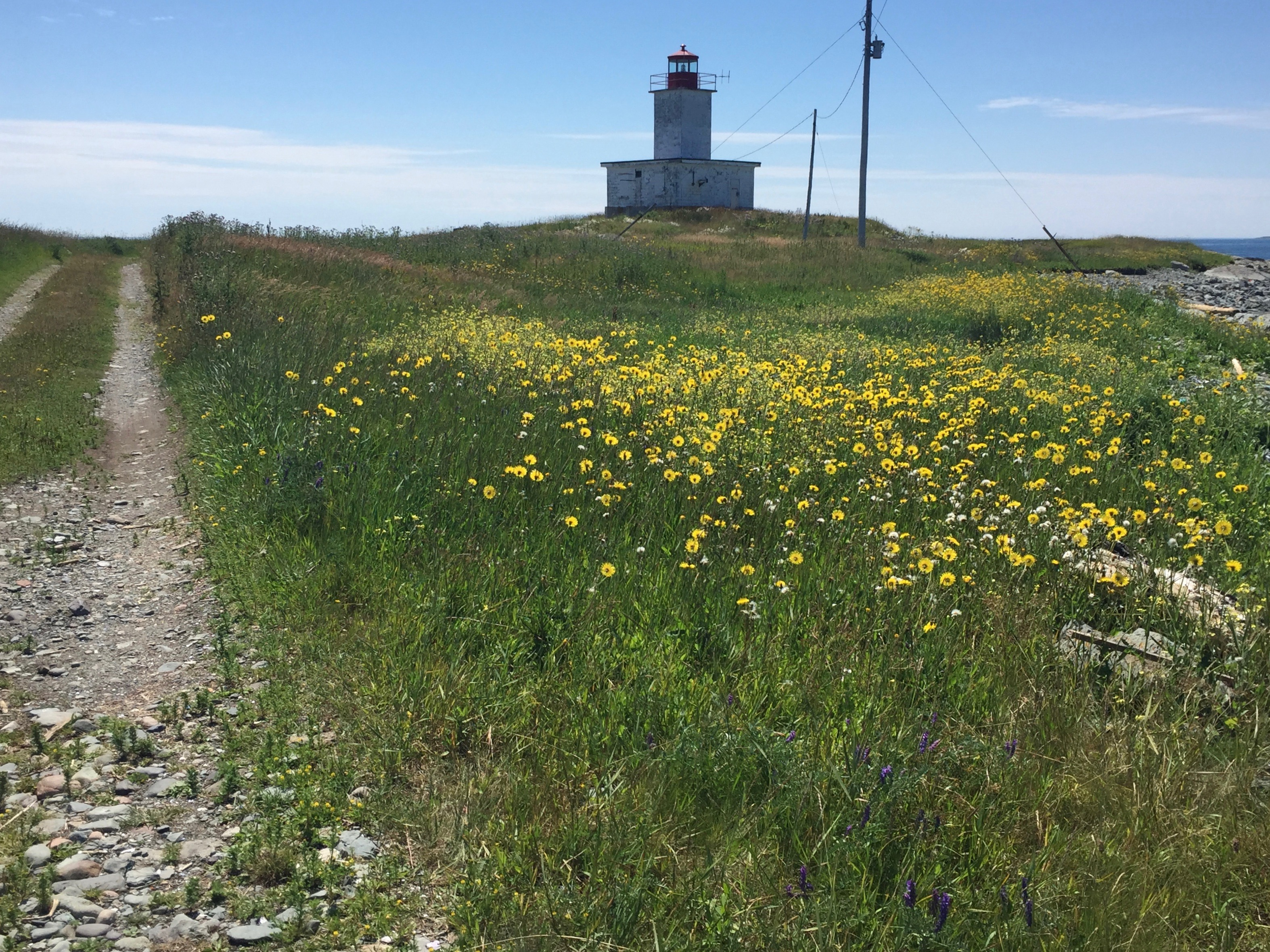
- Long Point Lighthouse at the southern tip of White Head Island
- Constructed: 1966
- Foundation: concrete base
- Construction: concrete tower
- Height: 11 m (36 ft)
- Shape: quadrangular tower with balcony and lantern rising from the fog signal building
- Markings: white tower, red lantern
- Power source: solar power
- Operator: Canadian Coast Guard
- Fog signal: 2s. blast every 20s.
- Focal height: 15.5 m (51 ft)
- Range: 12 nmi (22 km; 14 mi)
- Characteristic: Iso W 12s

White Head Island is located east of Grand Manan in the Bay of Fundy, New Brunswick. In 2011 the island had a population of 162. By 2021 it had decreased to 139. In 2023 the chair of the island's recreation committee estimated that the population, including summer residents, was 130. White Head Island was governed as a local service district prior to the 2023 New Brunswick local governance reform.

For approximately four hours surrounding low tide, the island can be reached on-foot from Grand Manan walking across sandbars and ledges through shallow water. A channel was dredged to allow fishing boats to reach the wharf to access White Head Village.

== Infrastructure ==
Its economy is based largely around aquaculture and fishing, historically through herring weirs.

The island had a two-classroom White Head Elementary School, until it was closed and students transferred to Grand Manan Community School. From 1976-2012, the island was served by the MV Lady White Head, until it was replaced by Coastal Transport Limited's William Frankland free car ferry between White Head and Grand Manan.

Until 2017 the island had a small general store. After it closed the White Head recreational council undertook a fundraising campaign to build a community centre and café, which opened in October 2023.

There is a Baptist church on the island that was completed in 1981. However, there are records of a religious house in use until 1928, when the second of three churches was dedicated.

There are 5km of paved roads circling the northern half of the island, while the southern portion has only gravel roads that are less accessible.

== History ==
The island has been identified as one of those written about in the 1604 writings of Samuel Champlain and Sieur de Monts.William Francis Ganong notes the Ile Gravee, "Beach Island", referenced in the works of Samuel Champlain and appearing on his 1612 map of the region is a reference to White Head.

The son of François Gravé Du Pont abandoned the ship left to his care and went to live among the indigenous tribes, adopting their customs for himself. He was arrested by Jean de Biencourt de Poutrincourt in 1610 but escaped captivity. The following year Jesuit priest Pierre Biard found the younger DuPont and brought him out on White Head Island to take public Confession, participate in Holy Mass and receive Communion reconciling himself to Poutrincourt. The younger DuPont asked Poutrincourt to dine with him as he reclaimed the ship left to his care, but during the meal Potrincourt lost his temper and seized the ship requiring Biard to come out again to make peace between the pair.

In October 1741, the brigantine Martha and Eliza wrecked in a storm and drifted to what is believed to be White Head Island, with approximately 200 passengers. Dozens of survivors were picked up in at least three separate rescues over the next six months, scattered across nearby islands.

The island was granted to Captain William Frankland who was for years its sole resident, Frankland invited J. J. Audubon to visit the island May 22 1833 to study the herring gulls whose eggs were harvested on the island. Frankland's journal later went to auction and was purchased by the New Brunswick Museum who created a copy to display at White Head.

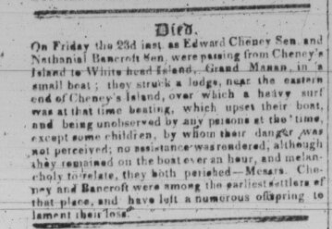
The 1835 death notice of Bancroft and Cheney, dashed to death on a ledge between the islands as children watched.

Edward Cheney died January 23, 1835 alongside Nathaniel Bancroft, when their small boat spent an hour crashing upon a rock between Cheney Island and White Head Island. In 1845, the Lighthouse approved £200 for a fog bell on White Head.

In 1912, the lighthouse keeper Patrick Conway was dismissed leading to years of Parliamentary inquiry. In 2010, its lighthouse was declared "surplus" by the Department of Fisheries which no longer wished to maintain it.

In 1930, a dead 37' great white shark was found in a herring weir at White Head. It was reported in 1936 by Vadim Dmitrij Vladykov who noted he had not seen it himself. The shark, "perhaps the largest great white shark ever caught", was recorded in the Guinness Book of World Records. A tooth from the specimen still existed as of 1988.

In 1969, five fishermen from the island were lost at sea when the Melissa Jean II capsized in the Cabot Strait above Cape Breton. A monument stands on the island to their memory.

== Gallery ==
White Head elementary school August, 2016

White Head Post Office

The car ferry William Frankland at Ingalls Head
