= Partridge Island (Charlotte County) =

Island in New Brunswick, Canada

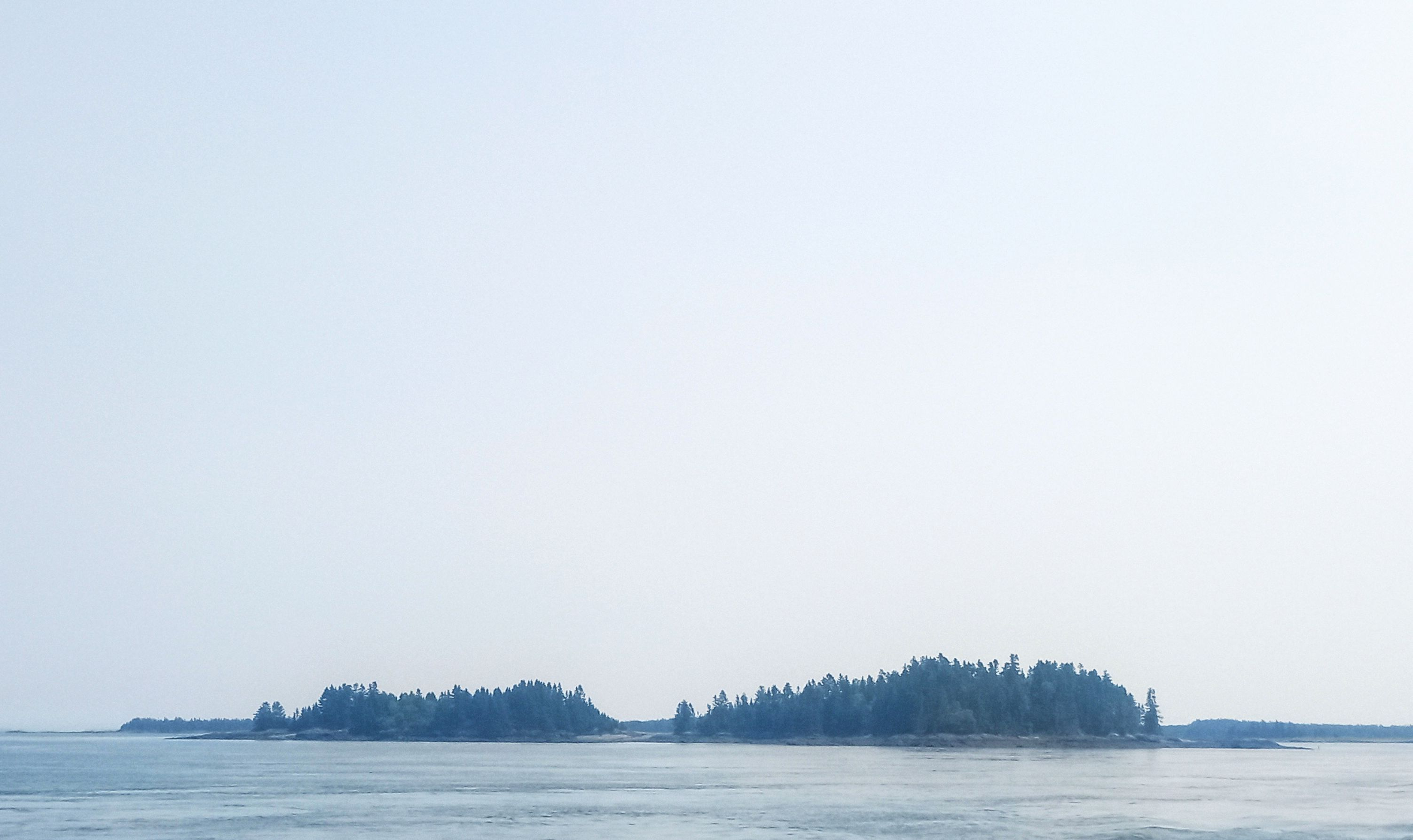
- Interactive map of Partridge Island

Geography
- Location: Bay of Fundy
- Coordinates: 45°1′27″N 66°55′42″W

Administration
- Canada
- Province: New Brunswick
- County: Charlotte
- Parish: West Isles Parish

Partridge Island is an undeveloped island in the West Isles Parish of Charlotte County, New Brunswick, Canada, where the Bay of Fundy enters Passamaquoddy Bay, off the northeast shore of Deer Island. As of 1983 the island was owned by Nellie Holmes.

It is the site of two shell middens, BgDr48 and BgDr49, that have been studied and dated between 400 BC to 500 AD. The time required for ancient natives to travel by canoe to the island has been measured.

The island has been identified as one of those written about in the 1604 writings of Samuel Champlain and Sieur de Monts.

== Geography and composition ==
Jameson, Crow, Hardwood, Parker and Partridge Island are all share a land shelf north of Deer Island, where the waters are generally less than 10m below mean sea level in depth. In 1869, Peter Galvin, Henry and John Dakin received a mining lease for Partridge Island.

The island has spruce and balsam fir, and is composed of dark-green fine-grained volcanic rocks. It has wild raspberry and gooseberry, and both mice and voles have been observed.
