= Grand Manan Parish =

Coordinates: 44.682813°N 66.787949°W

Grand Manan Parish Paroisse de Grand Manan
- Parish
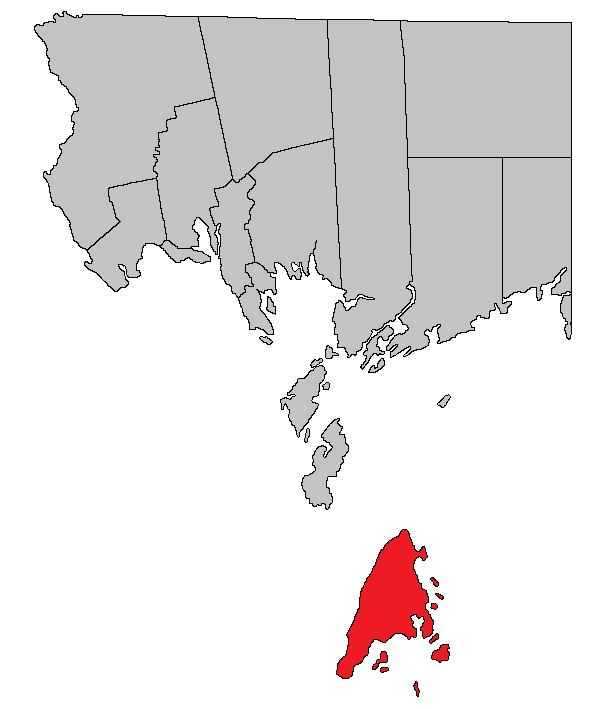
- Location within Charlotte County, New Brunswick
- Country: Canada
- Province: New Brunswick
- County: Charlotte
- Erected: 1816

Area
  - Land: 5.96 km^{2} (2.30 sq mi)

Population (2021)
  - Total: 139
  - Density: 23.3/km^{2} (60/sq mi)
  - Change 2016-2021: ▼4.1%
  - Dwellings: 106
- Time zone: UTC-4 (AST)
  - Summer (DST): UTC-3 (ADT)
- Figures do not include the village of Grand Manan, which includes all of the parish other than White Head Island

Grand Manan is a geographic parish in Charlotte County, New Brunswick, Canada, comprising one village and part of a rural district; the rural district portion was formerly a local service district (LSD); both of which are members of the Southwest New Brunswick Service Commission (SNBSC). The parish includes Grand Manan Island and numerous lesser islands, only one of which has permanent year-round inhabitants.

Confusion is sometimes caused by other uses of the name: epenthesis of Grand Manan Island to Grand Manan; the village of Grand Manan; the census subdivision of Grand Manan Parish, which includes only White Head Island; and the assumption of an LSD with the name of Grand Manan, which never existed.

== Origin of name ==
The parish takes its name from Grand Manan Island, which is often shortened to Grand Manan. Ganong gives the origin of the island's name as Mun-aa-nook', his transcription of the locative form of the Passamaquoddy word for island, combined with the French adjective grand used on some early French maps of the area.

== History ==
The parish was erected in 1816 from West Isles Parish as Grand-Manan, to include "Grand-Manan with its appurtenances".

The hyphen was dropped from the name in 1850 and appurtenances was clarified in 1877, implicitly adding Machias Seal Island to the parish. (Note: Machias Seal Island is 32 km from Grand Manan Island, perhaps a bit far to be considered an appurtenance.)

== Boundaries ==
Grand Manan Parish includes the main island and all islands to the south and west.

== Municipality ==
The village of Grand Manan was formed in 1995 and includes all of the parish except White Head Island.

== Former local service district ==
White Head Island comprised only that island.

The LSD was established in 1979 to assess for fire protection, making it the last inhabited part of the parish to become part of a village or LSD.

In 2021, the LSD assessed for only the basic LSD services of fire protection, police services, land use planning, emergency measures, and dog control. The taxing authority was 521.00 White Head Island.

Since the beginning of 2023, it forms part of the Southwest rural district.

== Former villages and local service districts ==
Before 1995 Grand Manan Island comprised three villages and two LSDs. Running clockwise from the northern end of the island, these were:

- North Head (village)
- Castalia (LSD)
- Woodwards Cove (LSD)
- Grand Harbour (village)
- Seal Cove (village)

== Communities ==
Communities within the parish. all communities except White Head are part of the village of Grand Manan

- Castalia
- Grand Harbour
- Ingalls Head
- Rocky Corner
- Seal Cove
- Tattons Corner
- White Head
- Woodwards Cove

== Bodies of water ==
Bodies of water (Note: Not including brooks, ponds or coves.) within the parish.

- Eel Lake
- Little Lake
- Bay of Fundy
- Long Island Bay
- Long Pond Bay
- Dark Harbour
- Grand Harbour
- Little Dark Harbour
- Three Island Harbour
- Wood Island Harbour
- Cheney Passage
- Grand Manan Channel
- The Thoroughfare

== Islands ==
Islands within the parish.

- Cheney Island
- Grand Manan Island
- Great Duck Island
- Hay Island
- High Duck Island
- Kent Island
- Long Island
- Low Duck Island
- Machias Seal Island
- Nantucket Island
- North Green Island
- Outer Wood Island
- Pumpkin Islet
- Rock Island
- Ross Island
- Sheep Island
- South Green Island
- West Pumpkin Island
- Western Green Island
- White Head Island
- White Horse Islet
- Wood Island
- numerous officially named rocks and ledges

== Other notable places ==
Parks, historic sites, and other noteworthy places within the parish.

- Castalia Provincial Park
- Grand Manan Airport
- High Duck Island Protected Natural Area
- North and South Green Islands Protected Natural Area
- The Anchorage Provincial Park
- Western Green Island Protected Natural Area

== Census data ==
Population totals do not include the village of Grand Manan

=== Population ===
Canada census – Grand Manan community profile

	2021	2016	2011
Population	139 (-4.1% from 2016)	145 (-10.5% from 2011)	162 (-14.7% from 2006)
Land area	5.96 km^{2} (2.30 sq mi)	6.05 km^{2} (2.34 sq mi)	6.20 km^{2} (2.39 sq mi)
Population density	23.3/km^{2} (60/sq mi)	24.0/km^{2} (62/sq mi)	26.1/km^{2} (68/sq mi)
Median age	49.2 (M: 53.6, F: 44.8)	52.5 (M: 50.2, F: 56.5)	49.0 (M: 45.5, F: 52.0)
Private dwellings	106 (total) 68 (occupied)	103 (total)	100 (total)
Median household income		$80,640	$.N/A

Notes: Income data
References: 2021 2016 2011

Historical Census Data
Grand Manan Parish, New Brunswick

Year	Pop.	±%
1991	189	—
1996	180	−4.8%

Year	Pop.	±%
2001	188	+4.4%
2006	190	+1.1%

Year	Pop.	±%
2011	162	−14.7%
2016	145	−10.5%

=== Language ===
Canada Census Mother Tongue - Grand Manan Parish, New Brunswick
Census	Total	English			French			English & French			Other		
Year	Responses	Count	Trend	Pop %	Count	Trend	Pop %	Count	Trend	Pop %	Count	Trend	Pop %
2011	170	160	▼17.9%	94.12%	5	▲ n/a%	2.94%	0	0.0%	0.00%	5	▲ n/a%	2.94%
2006	195	195	▲7.7%	100.00%	0	0.0%	0.00%	0	0.0%	0.00%	0	▼100.0%	0.00%
2001	190	180	▲27.8%	94.74%	0	0.0%	0.00%	0	0.0%	0.00%	10	▲ n/a%	5.26%
1996	130	130	n/a	100.00%	0	n/a	0.00%	0	n/a	0.00%	0	n/a	0.00%
