= Marble Island (New Brunswick) =

Island in New Brunswick, Canada

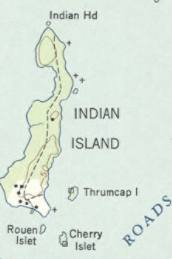
- Interactive map of Marble Island

Geography
- Location: Bay of Fundy
- Coordinates: 44°55′13″N 66°58′12″W

Administration
- Canada
- Province: New Brunswick
- County: Charlotte
- Parish: West Isles Parish

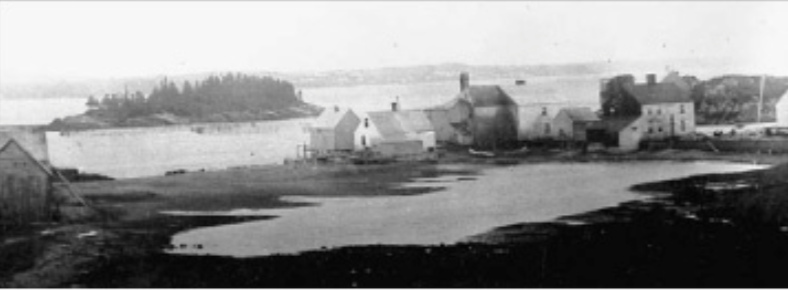
A pre-1900 photograph from Indian Island, showing Cherry Island on the left and Marble Island on the right; the white house in the centre is the Moses Residence.

Marble Island (also called Marvel Island, Rouen Islet or Rowan Islet) is an undeveloped island in the West Isles Parish of Charlotte County, New Brunswick, Canada, where the Bay of Fundy enters Passamaquoddy Bay.

It may have been occupied 3000 years ago. Archaeological excavation was done on the island by Stephen A. Davis and Albert Ferguson in the 1970s-80s. Four double-grooved stone axes of indeterminate age, possibly from the terminal archaic period, were recovered by Davis from Marble Island in 1982. BfDr8 is on the island.

As David Owen had rejected efforts to build a customs house on Campobello Island, objecting to its aesthetic value in sketches and coincidentally reducing his trouble shipping across the international border, the government was forced to build one on Marble Island which proved less than effective. Meanwhile Robert Pagan installed John Campbell on Marble Island to oversee his fisheries interests.

Three trading posts, belonging to James Simonds, William Hazen and White, are believed to have been built on Marble Island. In 1849, Marble Island merchant George N. Kay was wounded in the right lung, one of 120 people injured and dozens killed in New York's Astor Place Riot revolving around whether a British or American actor better cast in Shakespeare's roles.

On May 16, 1866 nine armed Fenians landed on Marble Island and took possession of Norwood's house until New Brunswick militia members dislodged them the following morning.

The island has been identified as one of those written about in the 1604 writings of Samuel Champlain and Sieur de Monts.
