= Bar Island (New Brunswick) =

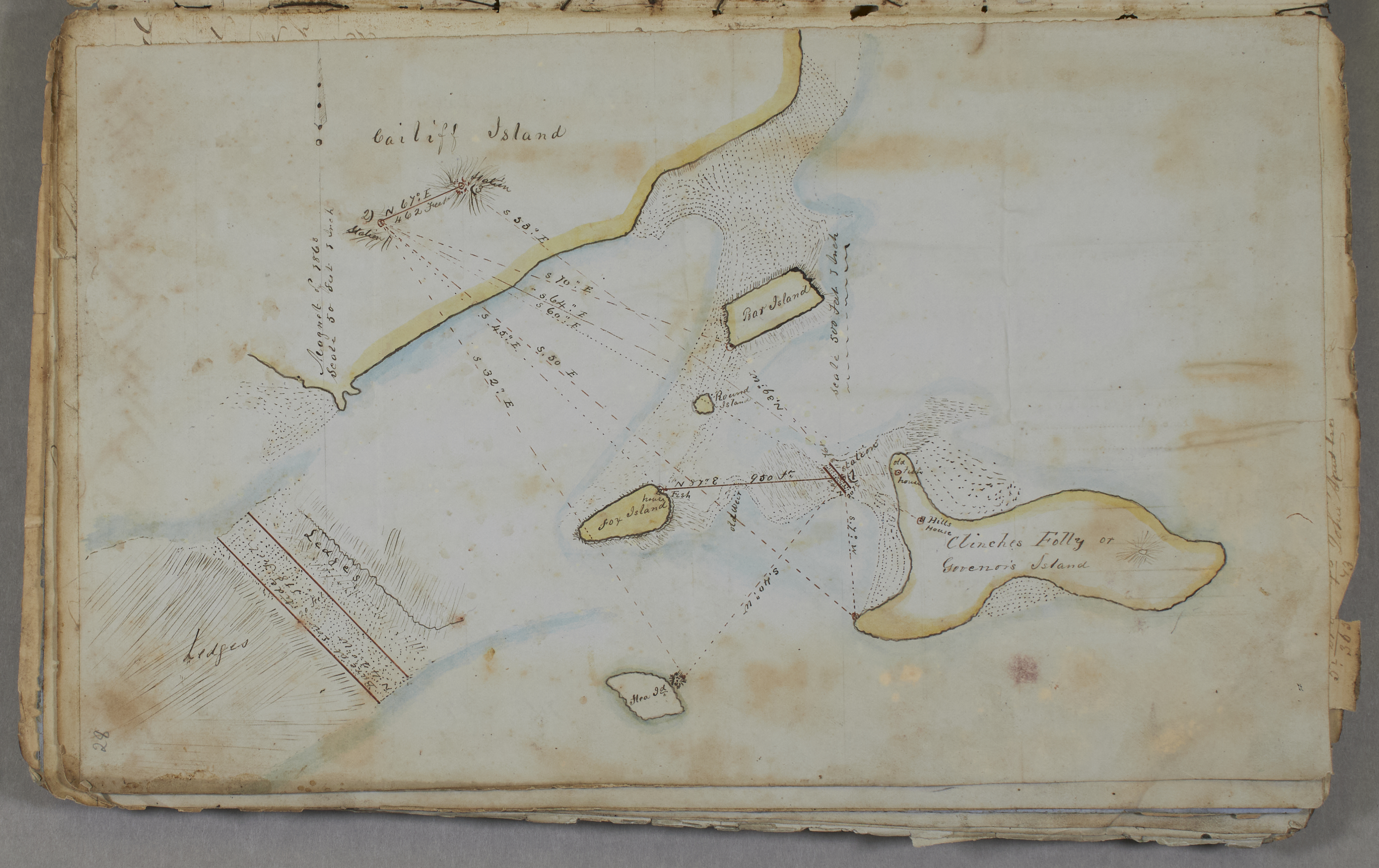
Bar Island, south of Frye Island

Bar Island is the name of two small islands in the Bay of Fundy, in New Brunswick, Canada.

- One lies off the south-east coast of Frye Island, at approximately 45.0501°N 66.8322°W. The southern end of the island is almost contiguous with Fox Island.
- The other lies off the south-east coast of Deer Island, at approximately 44.9668°N 66.9489°W. There is a historic cemetery on the island.
