= Cheney Island =

Island in New Brunswick, Canada

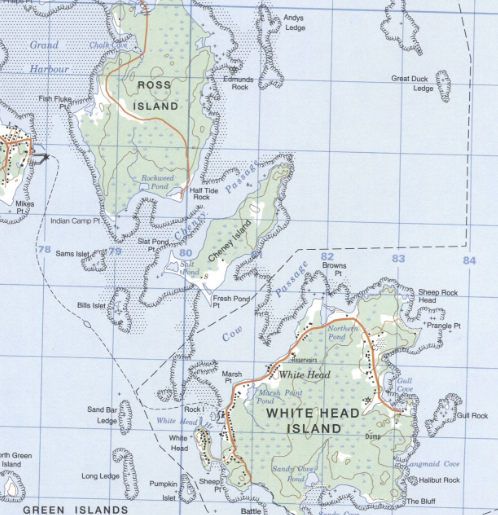

- Location within New Brunswick

Geography
- Location: Bay of Fundy
- Coordinates: 44°39′07″N 66°43′15″W
- Archipelago: Grand Manan Archipelago

Administration
- Canada
- Province: New Brunswick
- County: Charlotte
- Parish: Grand Manan Parish

Cheney Island is a tidal island located between Ross Island and White Head Island in the Grand Manan archipelago in the Bay of Fundy, New Brunswick. It is accessible by foot, at low tide. It is privately owned.

== History ==
In 1768, James Boyd of Newburyport published his legal intention to go into business with William Cheney and Joseph Connick in raising livestock on Indian Island, although there is not evidence they arrived despite an apparent Grant from Halifax possibly due to the influence of the American Revolution, and ultimately Cheney settled on Cheney Island in 1785 with his wife Elizabeth Swett who raised 13 children. William Cheney was murdered on the island in 1803.

Edward Cheney died January 23, 1835 alongside Nathaniel Bancroft, when their small boat spent an hour crashing upon a rock between Cheney Island and White Head Island.

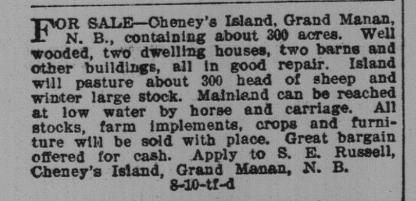
Russell's 1905 advertisement for the island

On November 27 1885, 35-year old Ophelia Cossaboom died on the island.

In May 1871, Cheney brought a legal suit against Guptill for placing a fishing weir alongside Cheney's, at the island's Whitehead Passage, but the matter was dismissed as Cheney had no claim to littoral waters past the high-water mark.

In 1875, four fishing weirs were licensed off the island to William Cheney.

In the 1890s, six eider ducks being raised by Simon F. Cheney, at his home on the island, were stolen by a visitor from Calais, Maine - but when they were later loosed from the thief's property in Calais, travelled the fifty miles of open sea to return to Mr. Cheney. In 1925, the Mourik family moved onto the island from the Netherlands until 1947.

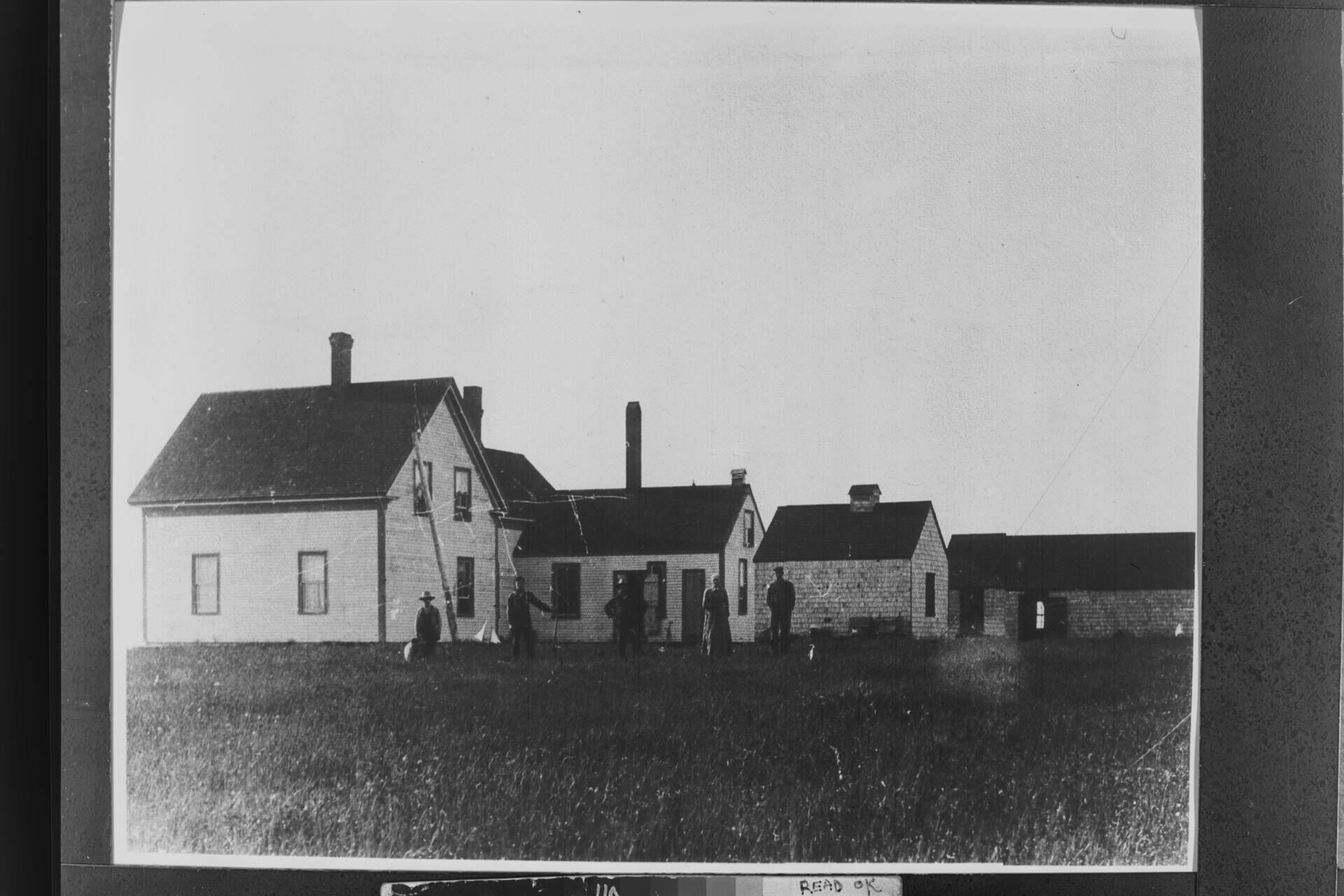
1925 photo of farm houses on Cheney Island

Capt. Warren Cheney sold the island to Edgar Russell, a native of Washington State, in April 1902. S. Edgar Russell began trying to sell the island in 1905.

It was purchased in the 1970s by Henri-François Gautrin Sr., the father of Quebec liberal politician Henri-François Gautrin, who built a new house on the island, as well as a smaller caretaker's home, as the former dwelling had not been used in twenty years.

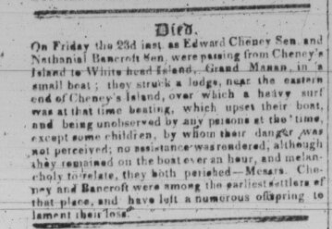
The 1835 death notice of Bancroft and Cheney, dashed to death on a ledge between the islands as children watched.

It had a telegraph station as of 1896, and its power is provided by NB Power. There is a remote-operated foghorn on Half Tide Rock, activated by any mariner clicking the radio microphone five times set to Channel 65A (156.275 MHz).
