= Frances Gillmor =

American folklorist, scholar, and novelist

- Born: 21 May 1903; Buffalo, New York, US
- Died: 28 October 1993 (aged 90); Tucson, Arizona, US
- Education: University of Chicago; University of Arizona; Universidad Nacional Autonoma de Mexico

Frances Gillmor (21 May 1903– 28 October 1993 ) was an American folklorist, scholar, and novelist.

== Early life and education ==
Born in Buffalo, New York, May 21, 1903 Frances Gillmor was the only child of Abner Churchill Gillmor and Annie McVicar Gillmor. Gillmor intended to be a writer publishing her first novel in 1929. She attended the University of Chicago in 1921 but left before graduation in 1923 and became a reporter. Her mother's ill health took the family to Arizona in 1926 and Gillmor returned to the University of Arizona where she completed a bachelor's and a masters in Arts, finishing in 1931. She became a Navajo expert, having done her master's thesis on John and Louisa Wade Wetherill in the Navajo reservation in Arizona.

== Career ==
Gillmor then taught in University of New Mexico and the University of Arizona. She went to Mexico to learn Spanish to improve her ability to engage with the Pueblo Indians, and in part because of a relationship with Ola Apenes. She also worked there as a freelance journalist covering the Dewey Commission in 1937 and interviewing Diego Rivera. While there, Gillmor became interested in the Aztecs and began research into Nezahualcoyotl which she later published as his biography. She studied with the Escuela Nacional de Antropologia e Historia in 1952 and Gillmor completed a doctorate, awarded with special distinction, in 1957 through Universidad Nacional Autonoma de Mexico. While undertaking study into the Aztec culture Gillmor was also investigating folklore, attending the University of Indiana's folklore institute in 1946 which led to the need to collect the oral traditions in the southwest of the US. In order to preserve the materials Gillmor set up the University of Arizona Folklore Archive which focused on the English and Spanish traditions. Gillmor was involved in the American Folklore Society and served as vice president in 1958 and 1964. She was given a Guggenheim Fellowship in 1959 to study folk drama in Spain and Mexico. Despite all her travel and research, Gillmor remained teaching in Arizona and was awarded the university's Creative Teaching award in 1970.

Gillmor died on 28 October 1993 in Tucson, Arizona. Her papers are held at the University of Arizona Libraries Special Collections.

== Bibliography ==
- Thumbcap Weir (1929)
- Windsinger (1930)
- Traders to the Navajos - The Story of the Wetherills of Kayenta (1934)
- Fruit Out of Rock (1940)
- Flute of the Smoking Mirror (1949)
- The King Danced in the Marketplace (1964)
