= Wood Island (New Brunswick) =

Island in New Brunswick, Canada

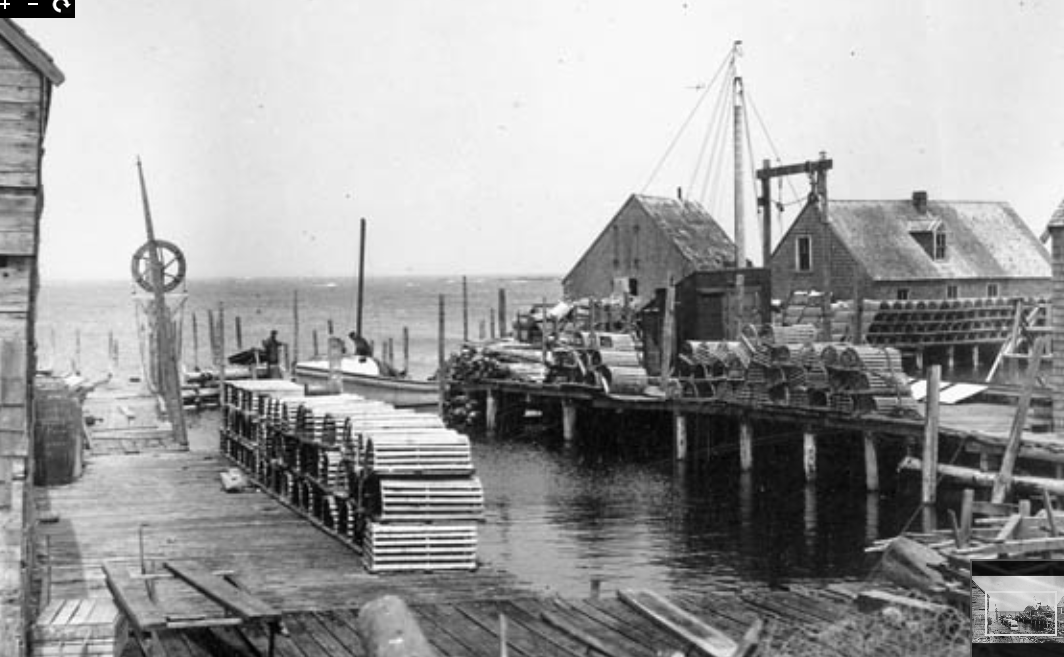
- Fishing wharves on Wood Island, 1926.
- Interactive map of Wood Island

Geography
- Location: Bay of Fundy
- Coordinates: 44°37′21″N 66°49′21″W
- Archipelago: Grand Manan Archipelago

Administration
- Canada
- Province: New Brunswick
- County: Charlotte
- Parish: Grand Manan Parish

Wood Island (also called Inner Wood Island) is an island located in the Grand Manan archipelago, in the Bay of Fundy of New Brunswick, Canada. It is distinct from its eastern neighbour Little Wood, or Outer Wood Island. Once home to hundreds of fishing families, it has been abandoned since the 1950s.

At its heyday in the 1950s, it housed a one-room schoolhouse, and a post office since at least 1926. The schoolhouse still stands, converted with solar panels and propane to a private summer cottage. The Reformed Baptist church was the only building with electricity, boasting its own generator.

== Geology ==
While most of the islands east of Grand Manan are stratified rock, Wood Island is conglomerate and fine-grained dark red sandstone.

== History ==
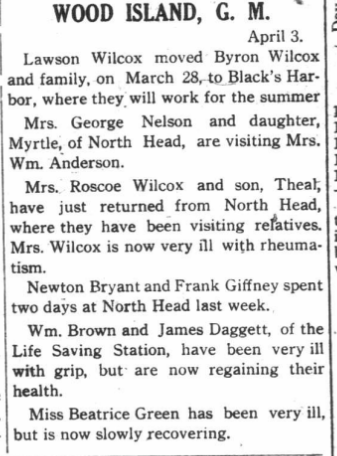
The social news of Wood Island in 1916.

In March 1606, François Gravé Du Pont ordered a barque to travel from the Bay of Fundy to Florida however after just one day it anchored in Seal Cove between Wood Island and Grand Manan, but the winds were so furious as to damage the 17-18 tonne ship throwing it on the shore of Wood Island where the crew repaired and reloaded it for four days before returning to the settlement of Samuel de Champlain near the St. Croix River for a couple weeks before Du Pont gave up on the expedition due to the fog and wind.

It was first settled by a man named Gerrald who also settled the outer island, and in time Wood Island became the property of William Ross who deputed William Green to oversee it, after Green had fallen from favour as an educator on Campobello. Green made a deliberate effort to introduce hares to the islands, and was baptised at the age of 80 by Rev. Joshua N. Barnes. Upon Ross' death, Green took ownership of the island. After Green's death, his sons inherited the island.

In the 1800s, it maintained a smoked herring industry.

On March 10 1871, the schooner Anna was wrecked on the island, with two crew killed. The William A. Black was wrecked on the southern tip of the island Dec 24 1840. The schooner Tiger was wrecked Dec 31 1893 on the northwestern coast.

In 1907, the population was approximately 150.

On July 1 1918, sapper Wilfred Shepherd of Wood island was killed in Mesopotamia as part of World War I and buried in Basra.

As of 1923, it had a buoy associated with the island.

Other incidents include the Quebec ship Laurentian (113641) running aground due to fog and wind on April 7 1926, and May 18 1926 the CGS Laurentian blowing its boilers while inspecting lighthouses and buoys and running aground on Wood Island.

=== Outer Little Wood Island ===
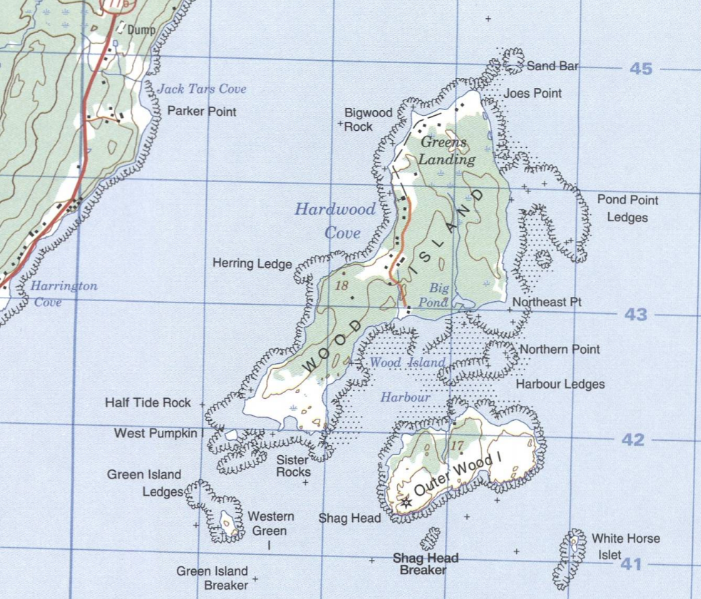
Wood Island and Outer Little Wood Island, east of Grand Manan

Outer Wood Island was not settled to a large degree, but saw naturalists such as Ernest Joy conduct species studies of its flora and fauna. In 1904, the relatives of Mrs Eliza Matthews Flagg were living on the island.

In 1911, the Department of Marine and Fisheries purchased a small plot on the southern tip to serve as a launching point for life-saving boats. A coxswain and five men operated a Sorel-Tracy twin -screw motorboat built at Sorel, and a Beebe-McLellan self-bailing boat. However in 1914 James Ingersoll noted the station was largely useless as the boats were not reliable in a gale, and had thus spent itself entirely on assisting fishermen who'd run out of fuel or had engine problems, but not once put out to save lives in a storm. After the station was abandoned, Luther Matthews wrecked the Mildred on Outer Wood Island in a storm, and found the life-saving station but couldn't get a fire started - but was rescued when Glenn Harvey on Inner Wood Island heard the commotion.

In 1970, Dr. Spacek owned the island and stocked it with fifty pheasants.

Telephone cable was laid from Grand Manan to Wood Island, to Outer Wood Island, to Gannet Rock Lighthouse.
