= Pain Island =

Island in New Brunswick, Canada

- Interactive map of Pain Island

Geography
- Location: Bay of Fundy
- Highest elevation: 33 m (108 ft)

Administration
- Canada
- Province: New Brunswick
- County: Charlotte
- Parish: Saint George Parish

Pain Island (formerly White Head Island, not to be confused with the current White Head Island several kilometres south toward Grand Manan) is an island in the Saint George Parish of Charlotte County, New Brunswick, Canada in the Bay of Fundy.

It is named for Dr. William Paine, who received the Crown Grant to the larger Frye Island directly north of it.

There was an osprey nest on the island for several decades.

It is very steep on its southern side.

The Arctica islandica quahog is noted as invasive between Pain Island to Bliss Islands.

In the summer of 1986, benthic algae sublittoral research stations were set up across the region including on Pain Island.
