= Nature Trust of New Brunswick =

Canadian non-profit agency

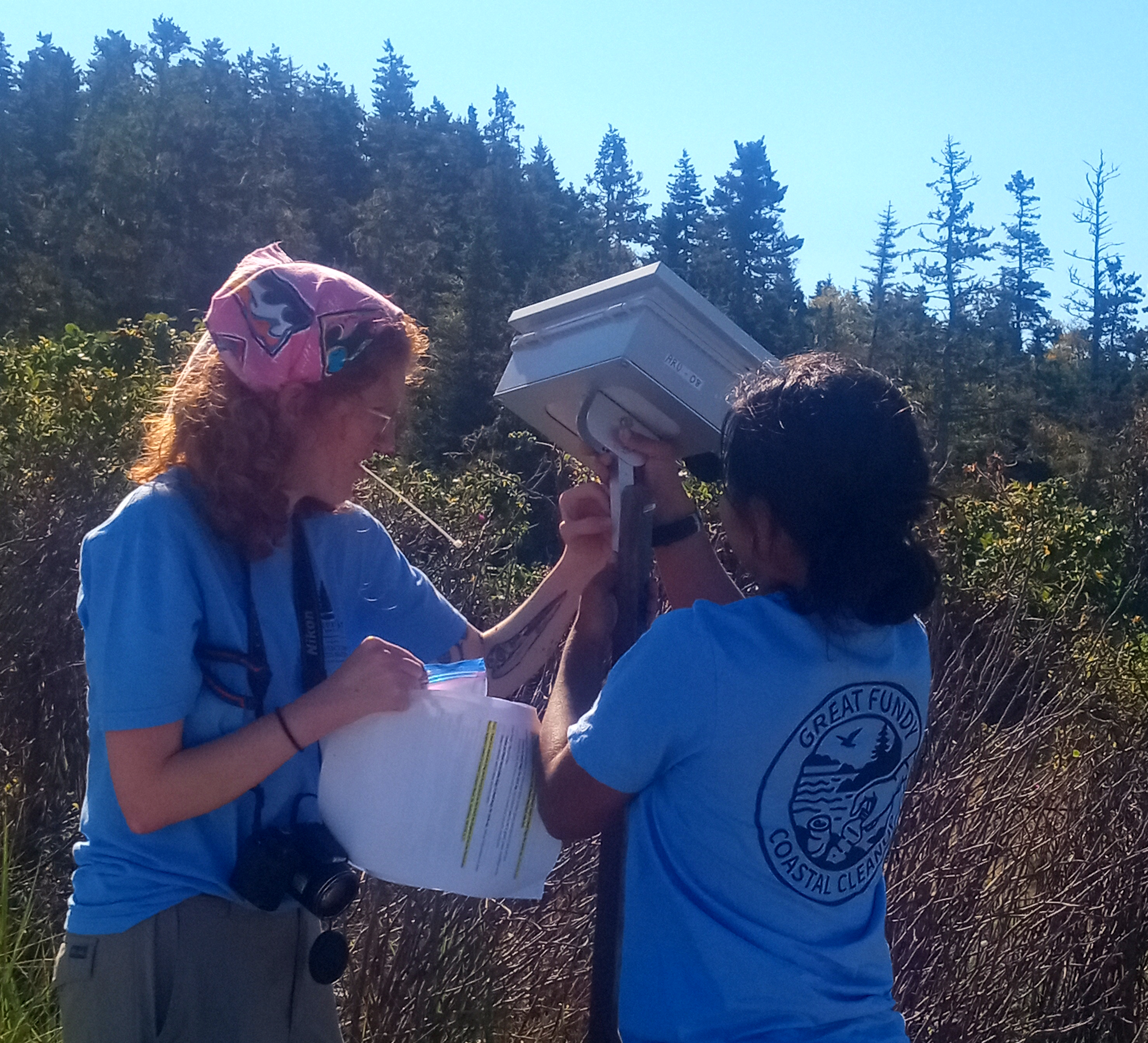
The Nature Trust installing a bird-monitoring recorder in West Isles Parish, New Brunswick.

Formed in 1987, the Nature Trust of New Brunswick is a non-profit agency working on conservationism in New Brunswick, Canada.

As of 2026, it holds more than 100 nature preserves and conserved lands, including fourteen entire islands in the Bay of Fundy.

Four of the lichen species they focus on since 2022 are scaly fringe lichen, wrinkled shingle lichen, blue felt lichen and white-rimmed shingle lichen.

== Advocacy ==
In 2021, the Nature Trust was one of the groups delivering a letter to the provincial government threatening to take them to court due to perceived negligence for not taking action on the 2012 Species at Risk Act.

== Projects ==
The Nature Trust has a land stewardship program with farmers and landowners, committing to certain conservationist measures to be taken on their land without handing any control the Nature Trust.

In 2024, the Nature Trust began its "Soundscape Project", with 10 solar powered recording units capturing bird calls that can later be identified.

The first Nature Trust protected property was Shea Lake Nature Preserve, which has 17 types of wild orchid.

The Nature Trust maintains a relationship with Keki’namuanen Msit Wen Wlo’tmnen Nmaqami’kminu, a Micmac land conservation group that holds over 4,000 acres in New Brunswick. In 2024, the Nature Trust donated 97 acres of land it owned near Blackville to the KMWWN.

In 2018, the Nature Trust began holding territory in-trust for the Passamaquoddy tribe which has recognition and federal-granted lands in the United States but not in Canada, helping to establish the Skutik conservation area across 11 sites in southwestern Charlotte County until the tribe is able to create a land trust of its own.

== List of protected areas ==
👣 = trail on property 𓅪 = Important Bird Area standards 🛇 = No public access

=== Northwest NB ===
1. Armstrong Woods Nature Preserve, Perth-Andover
2. Arthur Kyle Nature Preserve, Hartland
3. Balsam and Beyond (Official Name Pending), Victoria County
4. Beardsley Hill Nature Preserve,👣 Woodstock
5. Foster Family on Green Island Nature Preserve, Green Island (St. John River, near Florenceville)
6. George M. Stirrett Nature Preserve, near Tilley (Victoria County), acquired to protect an endangered population of Pedicularis furbishiae
7. Grand Tsuga Nature Preserve
8. Inglenook Wetlands Nature Preserve, Tobique River (northern NB)
9. James C. Yerxa Nature Preserve, Keswick River (near Fredericton) (borderline northwest along the river)
10. Kincardine Ridge Nature Preserve, near Perth-Andover
11. Louis W. Bassett Nature Preserve, Pokiok Settlement (York County)
12. MapleCross Demerchant Brook Nature Preserve
13. Mahsusuwi-monihkuk Nature Preserve, near Tobique
14. Rocky Forest Refuge (Official Name Pending)
15. Shea Lake Nature Preserve, near Shea Lake (Victoria County)
16. Speer Hillside Nature Preserve, Upper Woodstock (Carleton County)
17. Sugar Island Nature Preserve, Sugar Island (Keswick Islands, St. John River)
18. Warren Kent Coleman Nature Preserve,👣 Keswick River

=== Northeast NB ===
1. Bernie Bowie Sr. Nature Preserve, Miramichi region (Acadian Peninsula)
2. Dolan Woodlands Nature Preserve, Miramichi River area
3. Joseph Allain Nature Preserve, near Néguac (Acadian Peninsula)
4. Kingston Family Nature Preserve, Northwest Miramichi River
5. Mixed Woods of Bouctouche (Official Name Pending), Bouctouche area
6. Riparian Wilds of the Southwest Miramichi (Official Name Pending), Southwest Miramichi (near Doaktown)

=== Central NB ===
1. Baird Family Nature Preserve, in Taymouth north of Fredericton
2. Burpee Bar Nature Preserve
3. Butternut Island Nature Preserve (also called Taymouth Preserve), Nashwaak Bridge
4. Ferris Street Forest and Wetland Nature Preserve,👣 Fredericton
5. Hidden Lakes Nature Preserve (McWaid Lake area)
6. Hyla Park Nature Preserve,👣 owned by the City of Fredericton but stewarded by NTNB
7. James C. Yerxa Nature Preserve, Keswick River (near Fredericton)
8. Malsonawihkuk/ Malsənawihkok Nature Preserve, Maugerville
9. Margaret (Coburn) Cameron Woods Nature Preserve👣
10. Nələkwənəkek/Noloqonokek Nature Preserve, Middle Island (near Maugerville)
11. Nashwaak River Nature Preserve, Nashwaak River area
12. Welamokətok Cinerea Nature Preserve, Oromocto Island (St. John River)
13. Edwards-Jackson Nature Preserve
14. Forested Wetlands of Tracyville (Official Name Pending)
15. Hal Hinds Forest Nature Preserve
16. Leaning Cedar Nature Preserve
17. Leo Currie Nature Preserve
18. MacDonald Nature Preserve
19. Nighthawk Woods of Stanley (Official Name Pending)
20. Oak Mountain Nature Preserve
21. Paragon Woods Nature Preserve
22. Pickerel Pond Nature Preserve
23. Sasəkatəkok/ Sasokatokuk Nature Preserve
24. Seymour Woodlands Nature Preserve👣
25. Slippery Mitten Nature Preserve👣

=== Southwest NB ===
1. Bartlett Mills Nature Preserve, Bocabec
2. Beausoleil Nature Preserve, St. Croix River (near St. Stephen area)
3. Beldings Reef Nature Preserve,👣 Chance Harbour
4. Big Rock Nature Preserve, Springfield (Kings County)
5. Bliss Islands Nature Preserve, Passamaquoddy Bay (Charlotte County)
6. Blueberry Hill Nature Preserve,👣 Grand Bay-Westfield (Saint John area)
7. Boars Head Nature Preserve,👣 Millidgeville (Saint John)
8. Bonny River Nature Preserve
9. Caughey-Taylor Nature Preserve, Bocabec
10. Clark Gregory Nature Preserve,👣 Chocolate Cove (Deer Island)
11. Clark’s Point Nature Preserve, near Scotch Ridge (St. Stephen area)
12. Connors Bros. Nature Preserve at Pea Point,👣 Blacks Harbour
13. Dick’s Island Nature Preserve, Passamaquoddy Bay
14. Disher Conservation Easement, Bocabec
15. Frye Island Nature Preserve, St. George, comprising Cailiff Island, Hog Island, Douglas Island, Mink Island and Eagle Island.
16. Hampton Marsh Nature Preserve, Hampton area
17. Hidden Stream Forest (Official Name Pending)
18. Keiko & Errol Nature Preserve,👣 Ross Island𓅪
19. Letang Island Nature Preserve - A Stewart Family Preserve, L’Etang Islands (near St. Andrews)
20. MacNichol-Orser Conservation Easement, St. Croix River (Charlotte County)
21. Manawagonish Island Nature Preserve,𓅪 off Saint John (Bay of Fundy)
22. McPherson's Point Nature Preserve, nearLepreau
23. Minister’s Face Nature Preserve,👣 Long Island (Kennebecasis Bay)
24. Mount Misery Nature Preserve, on the Kingston Peninsula
25. Navy Island Nature Preserve and Conservation Easement,👣 (off St. Andrews)
26. New River Island Nature Preserve - A Stewart Family Preserve, Maces Bay (near New River Beach)
27. Noremac Nature Preserve,👣 near Grand Bay-Westfield
28. Pagan Point Nature Preserve,👣 St. Andrews
29. Penn Island Nature Preserve𓅪
30. Rayworth Beach Nature Preserve, Long Island (Kennebecasis Bay)
31. Reg Bonney Nature Preserve, Lower Kingston (Kingston Peninsula)
32. Saints Rest Marsh-F. Gordon Carvell Nature Preserve,𓅪👣 near Irving Nature Park (Saint John)
33. Sea Dog Cove Nature Preserve,👣 Kingston Peninsula
34. Seven Days Work Cliff Nature Preserve,👣 Grand Manan (north-eastern end)
35. South Wolf Island Nature Preserve,𓅪 (Wolf Islands, near Blacks Harbour)
36. Thomas B. Munro Memorial Shoreline,👣 Grand Manan Island (northern tip)
37. Thompson Marsh Nature Preserve, near Chance Harbour
38. Western Isles Nature Preserve - A Stewart Family Preserve, Mowat Island and its sister Little Mowat Island, Barnes Island (New Brunswick) and Nubble Island, east of Deer Island
39. White Island Nature Preserve𓅪
40. Long Island,
41. Meredith Houseworth Memorial Seashore,👣 Grand Manan
42. Cedar Crested Cascade,🛇 Mascarene
43. King Brook Nature Preserve
44. Von Ziegesar Conservation Easement

=== Southeast NB ===
1. Cape Enrage Nature Preserve,𓅪 near Alma
2. Grindstone Island Conservation Easement, Shepody Bay (Albert County)
3. Mapleton Acadian Forest Nature Preserve,3km👣 near Elgin (Albert County) created in 2017 with the Elgin Eco Association
4. Grande-Digue Nature Preserve,👣 Grande-Digue (near Shediac)
5. Malsonawihkuk/ Malsənawihkok Nature Preserve,𓅪 Maugerville (southeast along the Saint John River)
6. Wilson Family Nature Preserve, near Butternut Valley
