= List of shipwrecks in January 1851 =

The list of shipwrecks in January 1851 includes ships sunk, foundered, wrecked, grounded, or otherwise lost during January 1851.

== 1 January ==
List of shipwrecks: 1 January 1851
Ship	State	Description
Alessandro il Grande	Kingdom of the Two Sicilies	The ship was driven ashore and damaged in the Isles of Scilly, United Kingdom. She was on a voyage from Galway to Cardiff.
Henriette Royen	Kingdom of Hanover	The schooner foundered in the Atlantic Ocean. Her crew were rescued. She was on a voyage from Newport, Monmouthshire, United Kingdom to the Cape Verde Islands.
Middleton	United Kingdom	The ship was driven into an Ottoman Navy frigate and severely damaged at Beyrout, Ottoman Syria and was consequently beached.
Speedy	(United Kingdom of Great Britain and Ireland) Guernsey	The schooner was driven ashore at Margate, Kent. She was refloated the next day and taken in to Margate.

== 2 January ==
List of shipwrecks: 2 January 1851
Ship	State	Description
Campista	Brazil	The patache was wrecked on Victoria Island with the loss of nine of the thirteen people on board. She was on a voyage from Santa Catarina Island to Rio de Janeiro.
Clara	United Kingdom	The ship was wrecked on the Cobbler Rocks, off Barbados.
David Key	United Kingdom	The ship ran aground at Pittenweem, Fife. She was on a voyage from Newcastle upon Tyne, Northumberland to Pittenweem. She was refloated and taken in to port.
Freeman	United Kingdom	The ship was driven ashore at Crosby Point, Lancashire. She was on a voyage from Liverpool, Lancashire to Jamaica.
Lord Sandon	United Kingdom	The ship ran aground on the Eastern Bank, off the coast of Georgia, United States. She was refloated but drove onto the South Breaker Shoal and was wrecked. Her crew were rescued. She was on a voyage from Liverpool to New York and Savannah, Georgia.

== 3 January ==
List of shipwrecks: 3 January 1851
Ship	State	Description
Clara	United Kingdom	The ship was wrecked on the Cobbler Rocks, off the coast of Barbados.
Tasman	United Kingdom	The ship ran aground on the Lonsdale Reef, off the coast of South Australia. She was on a voyage from London to Sydney, New South Wales. She was refloated and taken in to Sydney in a leaky condition.

== 4 January ==
List of shipwrecks: 4 January 1851
Ship	State	Description
Cato	Hamburg	The ship ran aground on the coast of Spain. She was on a voyage from Hamburg to Trieste. She was refloated the next day and put in to Gibraltar.
Veran	Austrian Empire	The barque was driven ashore in Ringabella Bay, County Cork, United Kingdom. Her crew were rescued. She was on a voyage from Odesa to Queenstown, County Cork.

== 5 January ==
List of shipwrecks: 5 January 1851
Ship	State	Description
Albion	United Kingdom	The brig was driven ashore and wrecked near Charlestown, Cornwall. Her crew were rescued. She was on a voyage from Llanelly, Glamorgan to Charleston.
Cito	Denmark	The schooner struck rocks at Tarifa, Spain and was severely damaged. She was taken in to Gibraltar in a severely leaky condition.
Malvina	United Kingdom	The ship ran aground on the Shoebury Sand, in the North Sea off the coast of Essex. She was refloated and beached at Southend.
Minerva	United Kingdom	The ship was driven ashore at Shoreham-by-Sea, Sussex.
Union	United Kingdom	The ship ran aground on the Goodwin Sands, Kent. She was refloated and put in to Ramsgate, Kent in a leaky condition.

== 6 January ==
List of shipwrecks: 6 January 1851
Ship	State	Description
Allen King	United States	The brig was wrecked on the Ambergris Reef, off the coast of British Honduras. All on board were rescued. She was on a voyage from New York to Belize City, British Honduras.
Camerton	United Kingdom	The steamship ran aground on the Ross Sand, in the North Sea off the coast of Lincolnshire. She was on a voyage from Rotterdam, South Holland, Netherlands to Hull, Yorkshire. She was refloated and completed her voyage.
New York Trader	United States	The ship was wrecked on the Ambergris Reef, off the coast of British Honduras.

== 7 January ==
List of shipwrecks: 7 January 1851
Ship	State	Description
Ana	Chile	The barque was wrecked on the Chala coast, Peru. Her crew were rescued.
Daring	United Kingdom	The schooner was driven ashore on the Blackshaw Bank, in the Solway Firth. Her nine crew survived. She was on a voyage from Naples, Kingdom of the Two Sicilies to the Clyde. She was refloated on 26 January. She was refloated on 26 January.
Faedrenes Minde	Duchy of Holstein	The ship was driven ashore at Nyborg, Denmark. She was on a voyage from Flensburg to the West Indies.
Margaret	United Kingdom	The ship ran aground and sank at Lancaster, Lancashire.
Providence	(United Kingdom of Great Britain and Ireland) Jersey	The ship was driven ashore at the Mumbles, Glamorgan.

== 8 January ==
List of shipwrecks: 8 January 1851
Ship	State	Description
Arta	Greece	The brig ran aground off Falmouth, Cornwall, United Kingdom. She was on a voyage from Troon, Ayrshire, United Kingdom to Constantinople, Ottoman Empire. She was refloated.
Charles Hayle	United Kingdom	The ketch was wrecked on the Woolsterners, in the English Channel off the coast of Sussex with the loss of all hands.
Heroine	United Kingdom	The schooner was driven onto Carpenter's Rock, in the Cattewater. She was refloated.
Hope	United Kingdom	The schooner was in collision with the barque Superb (United Kingdom) 50 nautical miles (93 km) north of the Isles of Scilly and was abandoned by her crew. She was on a voyage from Tralee, County Kerry to London. She was reboarded the next day and taken in to Milford Haven, Pembrokeshire.
Lovely Lass	United Kingdom	The ship ran aground at Whitehaven, Cumberland. She was on a voyage from Liverpool, Lancashire to Whitehaven.
Three Brothers	United Kingdom	The ship was driven ashore in the Cattewater. She was on a voyage from Brăila, Ottoman Empire to Plymouth, Devon. She was refloated and taken in to Plymouth.
Traveller	United Kingdom	The ship was presumed to have foundered with the loss of all hands.
Union	United Kingdom	The full-rigged ship was lost in the Roman River, British Honduras. Her crew were rescued.
William Hogarth	United Kingdom	The ship was driven ashore and severely damaged at Lerwick, Shetland Islands. She was refloated on 11 January.

== 9 January ==
List of shipwrecks: 9 January 1851
Ship	State	Description
Ann	United Kingdom	The brig was abandoned in the Atlantic Ocean. Her crew were rescued by Union (United Kingdom). Ann was on a voyage from Newport, Monmouthshire to Saint Thomas, Virgin Islands.
Anna Maria	United Kingdom	The sloop foundered in the Bristol Channel. Her crew were rescued. She was on a voyage from Bullo Pill, Gloucestershire to Newport, Monmouthshire.
Ant	United Kingdom	The sloop was driven ashore at North Somercotes, Lincolnshire. She was refloated the next day and taken in to Grimsby.
Berbice	United Kingdom	The barque was driven ashore on the Nass Sands, Somerset. Her crew were rescued. She was on a voyage from Demerara, British Guiana to Aberdeen. She was refloated on 4 February and taken in to Bristol, Gloucestershire.
Caroline	United Kingdom	The schooner was wrecked on the West Hoyle Bank, in Liverpool Bay. Her crew were rescued by the Point of Ayre Lifeboat. She was on a voyage from Inverness to Liverpool, Lancashire.
Catherina Elizabeth	Norway	The ship was driven ashore south of Helsingør, Denmark. Her crew were rescued. She was on a voyage from Stettin to Leith, Lothian, United Kingdom.
Ceres	(United Kingdom of Great Britain and Ireland) Jersey	The ship was in collision with the barque Maidstone (United Kingdom) and foundered off Garrison Point, Sheerness, Kent.
Claydon	United Kingdom	The schooner was driven ashore in Llandudno Bay. She was on a voyage from Liverpool to Bangor, Caernarfonshire.
Courier	(United Kingdom of Great Britain and Ireland) Jersey	The ship was wrecked at Les Sables-d'Olonne, Vendée, France. Her crew were rescued. She was on a voyage from Jersey to Bordeaux, Gironde, France and Mauritius.
Dolphin	United Kingdom	The trow was driven ashore at the mouth of the River Avon. Her crew were rescued. She was on a voyage from Sydney, New South Wales to Bristol.
Eleanor	United Kingdom	The smack was driven ashore near Abergele, Flintshire. Her crew were rescued.
Hazard	United Kingdom	The brig was driven ashore on the Nass Sands. She was on a voyage from Messina, Sicily to Bristol, Gloucestershire. Hazard was refloated on 15 January and taken in to Bristol.
Hero	United Kingdom	The ship ran aground at Lindisfarne, Northumberland. Her crew were rescued by a pilot boat. She was on a voyage from Arbroath, Forfarshire to Seaham, County Durham.
James	United Kingdom	The flat was driven ashore near Rhyl, Flintshire. Her crew were rescued.
Jane Allison	United States	The ship was driven ashore and wrecked on Manawagonish Island, New Brunswick, British North America. She was on a voyage from Boston, Massachusetts to Digby, Nova Scotia and Saint John, New Brunswick, British North America.
John Daniel	United Kingdom	The schooner sank at Ilfracombe, Devon. She was on a voyage from Newport to Plymouth, Devon. She was subsequently raised and repaired.
John Sparks	United Kingdom	The ship ran aground and was wrecked in the Paracel Islands with the loss of six of her crew. She was on a voyage from China to Akyab, Burma.
Lady Sale	United Kingdom	The ship was driven ashore and severely damaged on Long Island New York, United States. She was on a voyage from Liverpool to New York City. She was refloated on 12 January and taken in to New York City.
Liskeard	United Kingdom	The schooner was wrecked on the Nass Sands with the loss of all hands. She was on a voyage from Bristol to Plymouth.
Lord Coke	United Kingdom	The ship was driven ashore at Redcar, Yorkshire. She was on a voyage from Rotterdam, South Holland, Netherlands to Stockton-on-Tees, County Durham. She was refloated on 13 January and resumed her voyage.
Lord Willoughby	United Kingdom	The schooner ran aground on the Brazil Bank, in the Irish Sea off the coast of Lancashire. She was on a voyage from Glasgow, Renfrewshire to Preston, Lancashire. She was refloated and taken in to Liverpool.
Raven	United Kingdom	The flat was driven ashore near Abergele. Her crew were rescued.
Rockshire	United Kingdom	The ship was wrecked on the South Breaker Shoal, off the coast of Georgia, United States. She was on a voyage from Liverpool, Lancashire to Charleston, South Carolina, United States.
Strop	United Kingdom	The sloop foundered in the Bristol Channel off the mouth of the River Avon. Her crew were rescued. She was on a voyage from Bullo Pill to Cardiff.
Terror	United Kingdom	The yawl foundered in the Bristol Channel with the loss of all hands.
Undercliff	United Kingdom	The flat was wrecked on Taylor's Bank, in Liverpool Bay. Her crew were rescued. She was on a voyage from Preston to Liverpool.
William Frederick	United Kingdom	The ship was in collision with two other vessels and was then driven ashore at Falmouth, Cornwall. She was on a voyage from Newport, Monmouthshire to Panama.

== 10 January ==
List of shipwrecks: 10 January 1851
Ship	State	Description
Edith	United Kingdom	The ship ran aground off Deal, Kent. Her crew were rescued by the lifeboat Northumberland (United Kingdom).
Essex Lass	United Kingdom	The schooner was abandoned in the Atlantic Ocean off Faro, Portugal. Her crew were rescued. She was on a voyage from Zakynthos, Greece to Queenstown, County Cork.
Euphemia	United Kingdom	The ship was wrecked on the Bahama Bank. She was on a voyage from Matanzas, Cuba to Newfoundland, British North America.
Hazard	United Kingdom	The ship was beached at Mogador, Morocco. She was on a voyage from London to Mogador. She had become a wreck by 2 February.
Lady Louisa Stewart	United Kingdom	The ship ran aground on the Long Rock, off Ballywalter, County Down. She was on a voyage from Nairn to Liverpool, Lancashire. She was refloated and put in to Donaghadee, County Down.
Louise	United Kingdom	The ship departed from Abrevach, Finistère France for Gloucester. No further trace, presumed foundered with the loss of all hands.
Perth	United Kingdom	The sloop was driven ashore and wrecked 5 nautical miles (9.3 km) west of Banff, Aberdeenshire. Her crew were rescued. She was on a voyage from Newcastle upon Tyne, Northumberland to Dingwall, Ross-shire.
Providence	United Kingdom	The ship was driven ashore at Ayr. She was on a voyage from Belfast, County Antrim to Ayr.
Sarah and Ann	United Kingdom	The schooner foundered off the coast of Cornwall. She was on a voyage from Cardiff, Glamorgan to Santa Cruz.
Scio	United Kingdom	The ship was driven onto the Burbo Bank, in Liverpool Bay. She was on a voyage from Naples, Kingdom of the Two Sicilies to Liverpool. She was refloated and taken in to Liverpool.
Victoria	United Kingdom	The ship foundered in the Kattegat. Her crew were rescued by Maria (Norway). Victoria was on a voyage from Danzig to London.

== 11 January ==
List of shipwrecks: 11 January 1851
Ship	State	Description
Alfred	United Kingdom	The ship was destroyed by fire at Quiriquina Island, Chile. Her crew were rescued. She was on a voyage from the Clyde to a port in Chile.
Beneficienza	Papal States	The schooner was wrecked at Sidi Mansour, Morocco. Her crew were rescued. She was on a voyage from Brăila, Ottoman Empire to Malta and Cork, United Kingdom.
London	United Kingdom	The brig was driven ashore in Pegwell Bay. Her crew were rescued by the lifeboat Northumberland (United Kingdom).
Maria	Norway	The ship was wrecked on the south coast of "Jedderen". All on board were rescued. She was on a voyage from Copenhagen, Denmark to Leith, Lothian, United Kingdom.
New Commercial	United Kingdom	The brig was wrecked on the Rocky Ledge, off the coast of Cornwall with the loss of eight of the ten people on board. Survivors were rescued by the Coast Guard. She was on a voyage from Liverpool, Lancashire to "Santa Martha", on the Spanish Main.
Susan	United Kingdom	The sloop struck the quayside and sank at Aberdeen. She was on a voyage from Glasgow, Renfrewshire to Aberdeen. She was refloated on 15 January and placed under repair.

== 12 January ==
List of shipwrecks: 12 January 1851
Ship	State	Description
Elizabeth	United Kingdom	The ship was wrecked on the south coast of "Jedderen". Her crew were rescued. She was on a voyage from Nysted, Denmark to London.
Franconia	United States	The ship was wrecked at Rhoscolyn, Anglesey, United Kingdom with the loss of eleven of the 21 people on board. She was on a voyage from Baltimore, Maryland to Liverpool, Lancashire, United Kingdom.
Ganges	United Kingdom	The ship was wrecked on Euboea, Greece. Her crew were rescued. She was on a voyage from Constantinople, Ottoman Empire to Hull, Yorkshire.
Queen of the Islands	United Kingdom	The ship was driven ashore at Overstrand, Norfolk. She was on a voyage from a Baltic port to Bristol, Gloucestershire. She was refloated and resumed her voyage.

== 13 January ==
List of shipwrecks: 13 January 1851
Ship	State	Description
Barco	United Kingdom	The brig was wrecked on The Shingles, off the Isle of Wight. Her crew were rescued. She was on a voyage from Newport, Monmouthshire to Southampton, Hampshire.
Colonia	Denmark	The brig was driven ashore at Fort St. Phillip, Gibraltar. She was refloated on 16 January and taken in to Gibraltar for repairs.
Geyser	Denmark	The ship was wrecked on the Danish coast. She was on a voyage from Copenhagen to Messina, Sicily.
Hebe	United Kingdom	The ship was driven ashore 5 nautical miles (9.3 km) south of Scarborough, Yorkshire. She was refloated and resumed her voyage.
Josephine	France	The schooner foundered off L'Orient, Morbihan with the loss of seven of her eight crew. The survivor was rescued on 16 January by HMS Vivid (Royal Navy). Josephine was on a voyage from Saint-Valery-sur-Somme, Somme to Bordeaux, Gironde.
Livingstone	United Kingdom	The ship ran aground on the Newcombe Sand, in the North Sea off the coast of Norfolk. She was on a voyage from London to Sunderland, County Durham. She was refloated and taken in to Great Yarmouth, Norfolk in a leaky condition.
Marie	France	The brig was driven ashore near Fort St. Phillip.
Père Eternel	France	The ship foundered off "Cape Lenco", Ottoman Empire. Her crew were rescued.
Philippine	France	The bombard was driven ashore at Gibraltar.
Robuste	France	The barque foundered off Algeciras, Spain with the loss of two of her crew. She was on a voyage from Marseille, Bouches-du-Rhône to Senegal.
Valiant	(United Kingdom of Great Britain and Ireland) British North America	The ship was driven ashore at Youghal, County Cork. She was on a voyage from Liverpool, Lancashire to Saint John, New Brunswick, British North America.

== 14 January ==
List of shipwrecks: 14 January 1851
Ship	State	Description
Camilla	(United Kingdom of Great Britain and Ireland) New Zealand	The ship ran aground on the Benn Rocks, in the Waikeki Channel. She was on a voyage from Auckland to Canterbury. She was refloated, resuming her voyage on 31 January.
Colonia	Denmark	The brig was driven ashore in Gibraltar Bay near "San Felipe", Spain.
Happy Return	United Kingdom	The ship was driven ashore at Redcar, Yorkshire. She was on a voyage from Lowestoft, Suffolk to South Shields, County Durham. She was refloated and put in to Hartlepool, County Durham in a leaky condition.
Incognita	(United Kingdom of Great Britain and Ireland) Barbados	The schooner was wrecked on the Weymouth Reef, off Sandy Cay, Virgin Islands. She was on a voyage from Barbados to Antigua.
Marie Rose	United Kingdom	The ship was driven ashore in Gibraltar Bay.
Majestic	United Kingdom	The ship sprang a leak and was abandoned in the Atlantic Ocean. Her crew were rescued. She was on a voyage from Odesa to Queenstown, County Cork or Falmouth, Cornwall.
Matilda	United Kingdom	The schooner was wrecked at Cruggleton Castle, Wigtownshire. Her crew were rescued. She was on a voyage from Garlieston to the Isle of Whithorn.
Olive	(United Kingdom of Great Britain and Ireland) British North America	The schooner was wrecked on the coast of Nova Scotia.
Philippine	United Kingdom	The ship was driven ashore in Gibraltar Bay.
Robuste	France	The ship was struck a sunken rock near Green Island, off Algeciras, Spain and foundered with the loss of two of her crew. She was on a voyage from Marseille, Bouches-du-Rhône to Senegal.
Sir Charles Napier	(United Kingdom of Great Britain and Ireland) Gibraltar	The ship was driven ashore and wrecked on the Islote de Sancti Petri. All on board were rescued. She was on a voyage from Gibraltar to Madeira.
Tentative	United Kingdom	The ship sank at Lisbon, Portugal.

== 15 January ==
List of shipwrecks: 15 January 1851
Ship	State	Description
Agnes	United Kingdom	The sloop was wrecked near Furness Point, Orkney Islands. Her crew were rescued. She was on a voyage from Loch Laxford to Banff, Aberdeenshire.
Constantino	Kingdom of Sardinia	The ship ran aground and was damaged off "Bandal". She was on a voyage from Newcastle upon Tyne, Northumberland, United Kingdom to Genoa.
Frances	United Kingdom	The ship foundered with the loss of all hands. She was on a voyage from Galaţi, Ottoman Empire to Queenstown, County Cork.
Happy Return	United Kingdom	The ship was driven ashore at the Mumbles, Glamorgan.
Lily	United Kingdom	The ship was driven ashore at the Mumbles.
Marie and Emilie	Flag unknown	The full-rigged ship ran aground on the Goodwin Sands, Kent, United Kingdom. She was refloated with assistance from the lugger Charlotte Ann (United Kingdom) and taken in to Ramsgate, Kent for repairs.
Narcisse	France	The ship was driven onto the Rocques à Deux Têtes, Guernsey, Channel Islands and was wrecked. Her crew were rescued. She was on a voyage from Rouen, Seine-Inférieure to Bordeaux, Gironde.
Nautilus	United Kingdom	The steamship was wrecked on the Platters, off the coast of Anglesey with the loss of nine of her fourteen crew. She was on a voyage from Dunkirk, Nord, France to Liverpool, Lancashire.
Thomas and Elizabeth	United Kingdom	The ship ran aground and was damaged at Ramsgate. She was on a voyage from Dordrecht, South Holland, Netherlands to London.
Thorn	United States	The ship was wrecked on the Great Key. All on board survived. She was on a voyage from Chagres, Panama to New Orleans, Louisiana.

== 16 January ==
List of shipwrecks: 16 January 1851
Ship	State	Description
Adele	United Kingdom	The ship was wrecked at Guernsey, Channel Islands. The wreck was taken in to "Salerie", Guernsey on 23 January.
American Eagle	United States	The ship ran aground on the Ouze Edge Sand, off the north coast of Kent, United Kingdom. She was on a voyage from New York to London, United Kingdom. She was refloated and completed taken in to Gravesend, Kent.
Ann	United Kingdom	The brig was severely damaged in a gale at South Shields, County Durham.
Ann	United Kingdom	The ship was driven ashore at Swansea, Glamorgan.
Antoine	France	The barque was wrecked near Cap-Haïtien, Haiti. Her crew were rescued. She was on a voyage from Port-au-Prince to Cap-Haïtien.
Canadienne	United Kingdom	The schooner was wrecked on Banal Isle. She was on a voyage from Runcorn, Cheshire to Galway.
Catherine O'Flanaghan	United Kingdom	The ship was driven ashore at Swansea.
Elizabeth Frith	United Kingdom	The ship was driven ashore and wrecked on Faial Island, Azores. Her crew were rescued.
Fletan	France	The brigantine was driven ashore and wrecked in Whitesand Bay with the loss of one life. She was on a voyage from Havre de Grâce, Seine-Inférieure to Morlaix, Finistère and Bayonne, Basses-Pyrénées.
George Kenneth	United Kingdom	The sloop was driven ashore near Ullapool, Ross-shire. she was refloated on 19 January and taken in to Ullapool.
Grace	United Kingdom	The ship was driven ashore in the Saltee Islands, County Wexford with the loss of two of her crew. She was on a voyage from Alexandria, Egypt to Preston, Lancashire. She was refloated by the Coast Guard and taken in to Wexford in a derelict condition.
Guerilla	United Kingdom	The pilot cutter was driven ashoreand wrecked at Newlyn, Cornwall.
Industry	(United Kingdom of Great Britain and Ireland) Jersey	The smack was wrecked between the Rennies and The Mewstone, Devon. Her crew were rescued. She was on a voyage from Jersey to Charlestown, Cornwall.
Josephine	France	The ship was driven ashore at "La Petite Eure". Her crew were rescued. She was on a voyage from Havre de Grâce, Seine-Inférieure to Honfleur, Calvados.
Margaret	United Kingdom	The unmanned schooner was driven ashore at Cushendall, County Antrim.
Princess Helena	India	The ship ran aground on the Pulicut Shoal. She was refloated but drove ashore 12 nautical miles (22 km) north of Madras and was wrecked. Her crew were rescued. She was on a voyage from Adelaide, South Australia to Calcutta.
Robert Watson	United Kingdom	The barque was damaged in a gale at South Shields.
Scipio	United Kingdom	The brig was wrecked near Warkworth, Northumberland. Her crew were rescued.
Stefano	United Kingdom	The barque ran aground at Falmouth, Cornwall. She was on a voyage from Queenstown, County Cork to London, United Kingdom.
Stern	Russia	The brig was abandoned in the Irish Sea with the loss of two of her crew. Survivors were rescued by Jessie (United Kingdom). Stern was on a voyage from Liverpool, Lancashire, United Kingdom to Messina, Sicily.
St. Lawrence	United Kingdom	The barque was driven into the brig Cobden ( Austrian Empire) and was abandoned at Queenstown, County Cork. She was later driven into the schooner Undine (United Kingdom). She was later reboarded.
Temperance	United Kingdom	The ship was driven ashore at Swansea.
Thomas Wright	United States	The ship was driven ashore between Swansea and the Mumbles, Glamorgan. She was on a voyage from Havre de Grâce, Seine-Inférieure, France to Cardiff, Glamorgan. Thomas Wright was refloated on 19 January and taken in to Swansea.
Wilsons	United Kingdom	The ship was driven ashore and wrecked north of Five Mile Point, County Dublin with the loss of four of her crew. Eight people were rescued; her captain was reported missing, feared dead. She was on a voyage from Demerara, British Guiana to Liverpool.
Witness	United Kingdom	The ship was driven ashore at Swansea.

== 17 January ==
List of shipwrecks: 17 January 1851
Ship	State	Description
Adèle	France	The ship struck rocks and sank at Guernsey, Channel Islands. She was on a voyage from Saint-Malo, Ille-et-Vilaine to Guernsey.
Eagle	United Kingdom	The ship was driven ashore at Sea Palling, Norfolk. She was on a voyage from Hartlepool, County Durham to Dover, Kent. She was later refloated and resumed her voyage.
Fottay	India	The ship sprang a leak and was beached at Madras. She was on a voyage from Coringa to Madras.
Jane Elizabeth	United Kingdom	The schooner was driven ashore at Sidmouth, Devon. Her crew were rescued. She was on a voyage from Poole, Dorset to Liverpool, Lancashire.
Jessie	United Kingdom	The smack foundered in the English Channel 6 nautical miles (11 km) off Bridport, Dorset.
Lilla	United States	The ship was driven ashore near "Faraneau". She was on a voyage from New York to Marseille, Bouches-du-Rhône. She was refloated and taken in to Marseille.
Mary Ann, or Mary Caroline	United Kingdom	The schooner was driven ashore near Lyme Regis, Dorset. Her crew were rescued. She was on a voyage from Sunderland, County Durham to Lyme Regis. She was refloated on 20 January and taken in to Lyme Regis.
Skylark	France	The ship ran aground on the Hat's Rocks, in the Isles of Scilly. She was on a voyage from Nantes, Loire-Inférieure to Waterford, United Kingdom. She was refloated the next day.
Vriendshap	Netherlands	The galiot was driven ashore and wrecked near Fleet, Dorset, United Kingdom. Her crew were rescued. She was on a voyage from Nantes, Loire-Inférieure, France to Harlingen, Friesland.

== 18 January ==
List of shipwrecks: 18 January 1851
Ship	State	Description
Elis	United Kingdom	The ship ran aground on the Elbow Sandbank, off the coast of County Waterford. She was on a voyage from Odesa to Cork.
Hellas	Greece	The brig ran aground at Dungarvan, county Waterford, United Kingdom. She was refloated in May, sailing on 31 May for Cork, United Kingdom for repairs.
Victoria	United Kingdom	The schooner was in collision with the brig Jovial (United Kingdom) and was abandoned off the coast of Essex. She was subsequently taken possession of by the fishing vessel Flying Fish (United Kingdom), reboarded by her crew and was taken in to Harwich, Essex in a leaky condition.

== 19 January ==
List of shipwrecks: 19 January 1851
Ship	State	Description
Flora	(United Kingdom of Great Britain and Ireland) Jersey	The ship was wrecked on the Corbière Rocks, Jersey. Her crew were rescued. She was on a voyage from Jersey to Guernsey, Channel Islands.
George Bennet	United Kingdom	The ship was driven ashore near Ullapool, Ross-shire. She was refloated and taken in to Ullapool.
Heroine	United Kingdom	The barque foundered off the coast of County Cork. She was on a voyage from Liverpool to Africa.
Parnitz	Stettin	The barque was discovered abandoned 12 nautical miles (22 km) south south west of The Lizard, Cornwall, United Kingdom by Frowning Beauty (United Kingdom). Four crew were put aboard; they took her in to Falmouth, Cornwall.
Troubadour	United Kingdom	The steamship was wrecked at Narberth, Pembrokeshire with the loss of two or three of her crew. She was on a voyage from Bristol, Gloucestershire to Liverpool, Lancashire.

== 20 January ==
List of shipwrecks: 20 January 1851
Ship	State	Description
Amalia	Russia	The ship was lost 20 nautical miles (37 km) south of Bergen, Norway. She was on a voyage from Stettin to Leith, Lothian, United Kingdom.
Charles Cooper	United States	The ship ran aground in the Hooghly River 5 nautical miles (9.3 km) downstream of Calcutta, India. She was on a voyage from Calcutta to London, United Kingdom.
Ellen Bryson	United Kingdom	The ship was wrecked off Cape São Roque, Brazil. Her crew were rescued. She was on a voyage from Cádiz, Spain to Pernambuco, Brazil.
Solid	United Kingdom	The ship ran aground at the entrance of the Carlingford Lough and was damaged. She was on a voyage from Newry, County Antrim to Newport, Monmouthshire. She put back to Newry in a leaky condition.
HMS Shearwater	Royal Navy	The ship ran aground in the River Avon. She was refloated.
Two Friends	United Kingdom	The ship was driven ashore near Cumberland Fort Hampshire. Her crew were rescued. She was on a voyage from Newcastle upon Tyne, Northumberland to Exeter, Devon. She was refloated on 17 February and taken in to Portsmouth, Hampshire.
Wanskapen	Flag unknown	The ship ran aground off the east coast of Kent, United Kingdom.

== 21 January ==
List of shipwrecks: 21 January 1851
Ship	State	Description
Barnaby	United Kingdom	The brig was driven ashore at Theddlethorpe, Lincolnshire. She was on a voyage from London to Goole, Yorkshire. She was refloated.
Mary Jane	(United Kingdom of Great Britain and Ireland) Jamaica	The schooner was wrecked in the Chagres River, Panama.
Restless	United Kingdom	The brig ran aground on the Cross Sand, in the North Sea off the coast of Norfolk, and sank. Her crew were rescued.

== 22 January ==
List of shipwrecks: 22 January 1851
Ship	State	Description
Charlotte	United States	The ship was driven ashore in the Bay of Yoff. She was on a voyage from New York to the Gambia River.
Favourite	(United Kingdom of Great Britain and Ireland) South Australia	The ship was driven ashore at Swan Point. She was on a voyage from Tahiti to Port Philip.
Johanna Christiana	Netherlands	The koff was driven ashore on Neuwerk. She was on a voyage from London, United Kingdom to a port in Jutland. She was refloated on 2 February and taken in to Cuxhaven.
Zurich	United States	The ship was driven ashore in the Cranberry Inlet. She was on a voyage from Havre de Grâce, Seine-Inférieure to New York. She was refloated the next day and completed her voyage.

== 23 January ==
List of shipwrecks: 23 January 1851
Ship	State	Description
Nostra Señora de la Merced	Spain	The ship ran aground at Dénia. She had been refloated by mid-February and taken in to Dénia.
Robert	Stettin	The brig was wrecked on the Goodwin Sands, Kent, United Kingdom. She was on a voyage from Dordrecht, South Holland, Netherlands to Rochefort, Charente-Maritime, France.
Sinbad	United Kingdom	The ship was driven ashore at Aberavon, Glamorgan. She was refloated the next day and taken in to Port Talbot.

== 24 January ==
List of shipwrecks: 24 January 1851
Ship	State	Description
Charles Cooper	United Kingdom	The ship ran aground in the Hooghly River. She was on a voyage from Calcutta, India to London. She was refloated on 27 January and put back to Calcutta.
Competitor	United Kingdom	The ship was abandoned off the Mull of Galloway. She was on a voyage from Liverpool, Lancashire to Leith, Lothian. She was subsequently towed in to Port William, Wigtownshire
Spy	United Kingdom	The schooner foundered in the Atlantic Ocean 20 nautical miles (37 km) west of the Rock of Lisbon, Portugal. Her crew were rescued. She was on a voyage from Odesa to Queenstown, County Cork or Falmouth, Cornwall.

== 25 January ==
List of shipwrecks: 25 January 1851
Ship	State	Description
Connaught Ranger	United Kingdom	The steamship was in collision with Sea Nymph (United Kingdom) in the River Mersey and was beached at Egremont, Lancashire. She was refloated the next day.
Emblem	(United Kingdom of Great Britain and Ireland) British North America	The brig was abandoned in the Atlantic Ocean (37°04′N 46°17′W). Three surviving crew were taken off by Anna Mary (United Kingdom). Six crew had been taken off on 19 January by an American ship. Emblem was on a voyage from Halifax, Nova Scotia to Barbados.
Flora Beaton	United Kingdom	The ship was driven ashore and wrecked at Kilnsea, Yorkshire. Her crew were rescued. She was on a voyage from Seaham, County Durham to King's Lynn, Norfolk.
Kauukualii	Kingdom of Hawaii	The schooner was lost in the large storm of 25/26 January being driven ashore at Koloa, Hawaii.
Philip Oakden	United Kingdom	The ship ran aground on the Hebe Reef, at the mouth of the Tamar River. She was on a voyage from London to Launceston, Van Diemen's Land.
Progressa	Kingdom of Sardinia	The ship was driven ashore on the Cromwels Rocks. She was on a voyage from Genoa to Bahia, Brazil. She was refloated and taken in to Waterford, United Kingdom in a leaky condition.
Thomas	United Kingdom	The sloop ran ashore at Port Talbot, Glamorgan. She was on a voyage from the Mumbles to Port Talbot.
Trident	United Kingdom	The barque was driven ashore at Berbice, British Guiana. She was refloated but had to be beached.

== 26 January ==
List of shipwrecks: 26 January 1851
Ship	State	Description
Ann and Mary	United Kingdom	The ship ran aground on the Burbo Bank, in Liverpool Bay. She was on a voyage from Runcorn, Cheshire to Aberystwyth, Cardiganshire. She was refloated the next day, anchored off the Rock Light and was abandoned by her crew. She was subsequently taken in to the Magazines.
Friends	United Kingdom	The sloop was driven ashore and wrecked at Donna Nook, Lincolnshire. She was on a voyage from Middlesbrough, Yorkshire to Ipswich, Suffolk.
Nisida Stewart	United States	The ship, under Captain Fales, was lying at anchor outside the port of Honolulu, Kingdom of Hawaii prepared to depart for Calcutta, India when a storm caused her to drag anchor and she went onto the reef. She was later refloated and placed under repair.
Noel	United Kingdom	The brig was driven ashore and wrecked in Four Acres Bay, near Aberthaw, Glamorgan. She was on a voyage from Appledore, Devon to Cardiff, Glamorgan.
Revanche	France	The ship ran aground and was damaged at Charleston, South Carolina, United States. She was on a voyage from Charleston to Havre de Grâce, Seine-Inférieure. She was refloated and put back to Charlest.
Swallow	United Kingdom	The ship was driven ashore in Studland Bay.
Thomas Tattershall	United Kingdom	The ship was in collision with an American ship off Skerries, County Dublin and was abandoned by her crew. She was on a voyage from Cardiff, Glamorgan to Liverpool, Lancashire.
Venus	United Kingdom	The ship was driven ashore and wrecked near Aberthaw. She was on a voyage from Appledore, Devon to Cardiff.
Victory	United Kingdom	The schooner was driven ashore in Pegwell Bay. Her crew were rescued by the lifeboat Northumberland (United Kingdom).

== 27 January ==
List of shipwrecks: 27 January 1851
Ship	State	Description
Ann	United Kingdom	The ship was driven ashore near Poole, Dorset. She was on a voyage from London to Llanelly, Glamorgan. She was refloated.
Emerald Isle	United Kingdom	The ship was run into by the tugboat Liver (United Kingdom) off the Magazines and was severely damaged. She was on a voyage from Liverpool, Lancashire to London. she was consequently beached at Liverpool.
Harmony	(United Kingdom of Great Britain and Ireland) British North America	The ship was driven ashore near Arichat, Nova Scotia.
Helene	Norway	The jacht was driven ashore and wrecked at Utsira. Her crew were rescued.
Jane	United Kingdom	The ship ran aground on the West Hoyle sandbank, in Liverpool Bay. She was refloated and taken in to Liverpool in a leaky condition.
John Adams	United States	The steamboat struck a sunken object and sank in the Mississippi River with the loss of 123 of the 230 people on board. Some of the survivors were rescued by Peyton United States.
Lord Howick	United Kingdom	The brig sank off Sea Palling, Norfolk. She was on a voyage from Sunderland, County Durham to Ipswich, Suffolk.
Maria Isabella	Portugal	The schooner ran aground off The Needles, Isle of Wight, United Kingdom. She was on a voyage from Lisbon to Newcastle upon Tyne, Northumberland, United Kingdom. She was later refloated and put in to Ramsgate, Kent, United Kingdom in a leaky condition.
Normond Maid	United Kingdom	The schooner struck The Manacles and capsized with the loss of six of the seven people on board. She was on a voyage from Nantes, Loire-Inférieure, France to Falmouth, Cornwall.
Peterel	United Kingdom	The ship was driven against the pier and sank at Bridlington, Yorkshire. She was on a voyage from Seaham, County Durham to London.
Sultana	(United Kingdom of Great Britain and Ireland) Jersey	The ship sprang a leak and was abandoned off Lihou, Channel Islands. She was on a voyage from Jersey to the Cape Coast Castle. She subsequently drove ashore in Coles Bay, Jersey.
Thorwaldsen	Denmark	The ship ran aground on the Hesseloe Reef, in the Kattegat. All on board were rescued. She was on a voyage from Rio de Janeiro, Brazil to Copenhagen. She had sunk by 1 February.
Trafalgar	United Kingdom	The smack was wrecked at Ballymacormick Point, County Down. She was on a voyage from Glasgow, Renfrewshire to Fleetwood, Lancashire.
Virgilia	United Kingdom	The ship ran aground between "Mysole Island" and "Popa Island" and was abandoned by her crew. She was on a voyage from Bombay, India to China.
Whitehaven	United Kingdom	The ship ran aground on the Burbo Bank, in Liverpool Bay. She was on a voyage from Cardiff, Glamorgan to Liverpool. She was refloated with assistance from the Liverpool Lifeboat and the tug Express (United Kingdom and taken in to Liverpool in a sinking condition.

== 28 January ==
List of shipwrecks: 28 January 1851
Ship	State	Description
Christoph	Netherlands	The ship was wrecked on the Goodwin Sands, Kent, United Kingdom with the loss of all hands. She was on a voyage from Rotterdam, South Holland to Liverpool, Lancashire, United Kingdom.
Gezina Terina	Netherlands	The koff was wrecked on the Longsand, in the North Sea off the coast of Essex, United Kingdom. All on board were rescued by Orwell (United Kingdom).She was on a voyage from Dordrecht, South Holland to Belfast, County Antrim, United Kingdom.
Victorie Jes Marie	France	The lugger was driven ashore and severely damaged at Blyth, Northumberland, United Kingdom. She was refloated and towed in to the River Tyne.

== 29 January ==
List of shipwrecks: 29 January 1851
Ship	State	Description
Constitution	United Kingdom	The brig was wrecked on Fisherman Island, Maine, United States. She was on a voyage from New York, United States to Saint John, New Brunswick, British North America.
Ferrett	United Kingdom	The schooner was in collision with a brig in the English Channel and was abandoned by her crew. She was on a voyage from Newcastle upon Tyne, Northumberland to Bordeaux, Gironde, France. She was later taken in tow by a smack but foundered off Dartmouth, Devon.
Skandinavien	Denmark	The brig was driven ashore south of Warkworth, Northumberland, United Kingdom. She was on a voyage from a Baltic port to Leith, Lothian, United Kingdom.

== 30 January ==
List of shipwrecks: 30 January 1851
Ship	State	Description
Christine Marie	Denmark	The ship was driven ashore at the entrance to the Agger Canal. She was on a voyage from Thisted to Hull, Yorkshire, United Kingdom.

== 31 January ==
List of shipwrecks: 31 January 1851
Ship	State	Description
Betsey	United Kingdom	The ship was in collision with Richard Watson (United Kingdom and was abandoned in the North Sea off the coast of Yorkshire. Her crew were rescued by Richard Watson.
Halcyon	United Kingdom	The ship ran aground at Launceston, Van Diemen's Land. She was on a voyage from Launceston to San Francisco, California, United States. She was refloated, and resumed her voyage the next day.
Patience	Russia	The ship was run into by Davenport (United States) and severely damaged at Cowes, Isle of Wight, United Kingdom. She was on a voyage from Hartlepool, County Durham, United Kingdom to Odesa. She was taken in to Cowes for repairs.

== Unknown date ==
List of shipwrecks: Unknown date in January 1851
Ship	State	Description
Aerd van Nes	Netherlands	The ship ran aground on the Dingfes Reef, in the Bali Strait before 26 January. She was on a voyage from "Passarouany", Netherlands East Indies to a Dutch port. She was refloated and put in to Surabaya, Netherlands East Indies.
Antona	France	The ship was driven ashore near Cap-Haïtien, Haiti. Her crew were rescued. She was on a voyage from Port-au-Prince to Cap-Haïtien.
Arsene	Belgium	The ship was abandoned off Cape St. Vincent, Portugal. Her crew were rescued by Eliza (Flag unknown).
Azenoria	United States	The brig was abandoned in the Atlantic Ocean before 10 January.
Edwin	United Kingdom	The ship departed from Nantes, Loire-Inférieure, France for Liverpool, Lancashire. No further trace, preusumed foundered with the loss of all hands.
Eugenie	France	The ship caught fire and sank in the Gironde River near "Puchard" before 15 January. She was on a voyage from Bordeaux, Gironde to the South Seas. The wreck was towed in to Royan, Charente-Maritime before 19 January
Hibernia	United Kingdom	The ship ran aground on the Friars, off the coast of Anglesey. She was on a voyage from Workington, Cumberland to Dublin. She was refloated on 5 January.
Ina	United Kingdom	The ship was driven ashore on Redonda, Leeward Islands in late January. She was on a voyage from Bristol, Gloucestershire to Jamaica. She was refloated and resumed her voyage.
Isabella	United Kingdom	The ship was abandoned in the Atlantic Ocean before 12 January. Her crew were rescued by Elizabeth Frith (United States)/ Isabella was on a voyage from South Shields, County Durham to Newhaven, Connecticut, United States.
Jessy	United Kingdom	The ship foundered in the English Channel off the coast of Dorset in mid-January.
John	United Kingdom	The ship was driven ashore at "Trefaday", Anglesey. She was on a voyage from Liverpool to Youghal, County Cork. She was refloated on 3 January and taken in to Holyhead, Anglesey.
Joseph Cristal	United Kingdom	The brig was wrecked at San Cataldo di Lecce, Kingdom of the Two Sicilies. She was on a voyage from the Gulf of Venice to Southampton, Hampshire.
Lady Wright	United Kingdom	The schooner was driven ashore Salé, Morocco before 15 January. She was on a voyage from Gibraltar to Rabat, Morocco. She was refloated.
Loyalty	United Kingdom	The ship was wrecked on the Whiting Sand, in the North Sea off the coast of Essex. Her crew were rescued by the smacks Aurora's Increase and Tryal (both United Kingdom).
Michele	Flag unknown	The ship was lost in the Sea of Marmora in early January. She was on a voyage from Galaţi, Ottoman Empire to London, United Kingdom.
Orezaba	United Kingdom	The ship was wrecked at Bonny, Africa. She was on a voyage from Bonny to Liverpool.
Prince Charlie	United Kingdom	The ship ran aground on a reef off "Cape Vilain". She was on a voyage from "Baby Egg Island" to London. She was refloated and put back to Baby Egg Island.
St. Apostolo	Ottoman Empire	The ship was lost near Mangalia in early January. She was on a voyage from Brăila to a British port.
Three Brothers	United Kingdom	The ship was driven ashore at the Mumbles, Glamorgan. She was refloated on 29 January.
Toronto	United States	The ship was damaged by fire and was abandoned off the Memory Rock. She was on a voyage from New Orleans, Louisiana to New York.
