= Bliss Islands =

Island in New Brunswick, Canada

Native name: Seebes'kook "High Tide Flows Through It"
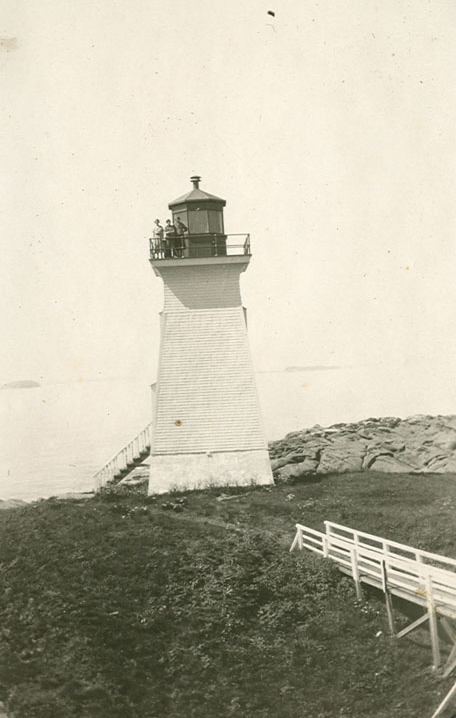
- Lighthouse on Bliss Island
- Interactive map of Bliss Islands

Geography
- Location: Bay of Fundy
- Coordinates: 45°01′1″N 66°51′0″W
- Area: 42.1 ha (104 acres)

Administration
- Canada
- Province: New Brunswick
- County: Charlotte
- Parish: Saint George Parish

The Bliss Islands (formerly L'etang Islands) are three adjacent islands in the Saint George Parish of Charlotte County, New Brunswick, Canada in the Bay of Fundy. They are named after Samuel Bliss, the original grantee in the 18th century who was also granted title to White Horse Island. They are commonly written as a single island, although technically there is a northeast ("Pentelow's Island"), central and southwest landmass.

The Bliss Islands have three shell middens, dubbed BgDq4, BgDq5 and BgDq6, as well as a site believe to be Bliss's original home. An arrowhead estimated to date to 600BC has also been recovered in the BgDg6 midden. Rum Beach has also yielded stones with signs of primitive human shaping.

There is a lighthouse on the west end of the island, on the southern side of the western entrance to Bliss Harbour.

== History ==
In 1784, Samuel Bliss was granted ownership of the islands for himself and several compatriots from the war, and he lived there with his family until his 1803 death, after which his family abandoned the islands.

Irish immigrant Timothy O'Connor had arrived in New Brunswick after serving in the British Army and was granted 4,000 acres on Whittier Ridge; he ultimately moved to the Bliss Islands, where he died – leading his family to relocate to a place called Connor's Beach on Frye Island. His grandsons Patrick and Lewis Jr formed the Connors Brothers Limited seafood company, on the mainland.

Ernest Ingersoll mentions passing the islands, en route to Lubec by steamship from Saint John.

Spencer Fullerton Baird carried out a 19th-century archaeological study of the islands.

During the Saxby Gale of 1869, the Rechab ship sank in Bliss Harbour; in 1850 she had been part of a "mysterious" journey to the Turks and Caicos hoping to retrieve pirate treasure.

In 1873, the G.F. Baird was wrecked in a snowstorm off the Bliss Islands. In 1874, a snowstorm also saw the wreck of the Levi Hart. In 1881, the Nota Bene was wrecked in thick fog.

As of 1879, Jarvis Clark and his family ran the lighthouse. In 1911, there was one family listed as living on the island.

At one point a headless sailor's body was found on Bliss Island, and locals buried it without ado - but over the years reported sightings of a headless ghost.

As of 1923, it had a buoy associated with the island.

In October 1925, Harry Stone's two-masted schooner Cora Gertie (purchased from the sons of Captain Crocker and built at Richardson's shipyard on Deer Island), sank with no lives lost, in a gale after being blown into Bliss Harbour and striking Man O War Islet. It had been parked 12 miles off the coast to sell smuggled White Horse whiskey which was salvaged from the sunken wreck. Prohibition inspectors found ten gallons of alcohol in a bog on Spruce Island where the crew had reached shore.

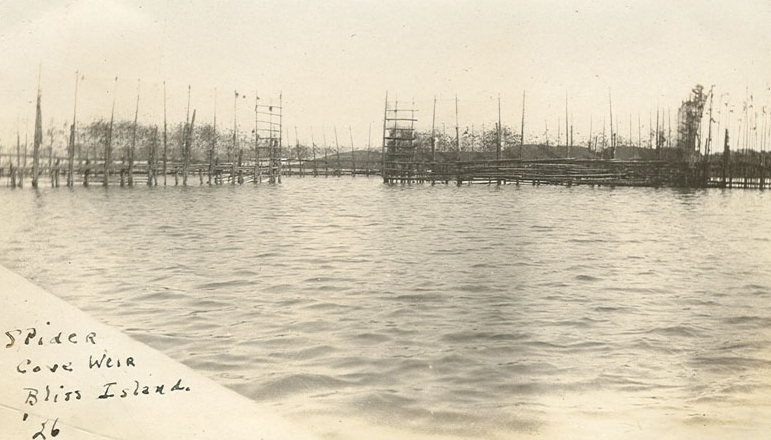
The Spider Cove fishing weir off the Bliss Islands

In 1982, archaeologist David Black excavated the original Bliss homestead.

In the summer of 1986, benthic algae sublittoral research stations were set up across the region, including on the Bliss islands.

In 2020, the Nature Trust of New Brunswick converted the island into a conservationist reserve.
