= Navy Island (disambiguation) =

Navy Island is a small uninhabited island in the Niagara River in Ontario, Canada.

Navy Island may also refer to:

- Navy Island (Saint John), formerly a small island in the inner harbour of Saint John, New Brunswick, Canada
- Navy Island (Saint Andrews), an island in the Bay of Fundy, New Brunswick, Canada
- Navy Island, Jamaica, a small uninhabited island off the coast of Port Antonio, Jamaica
- Navy Island (Minnesota), now Raspberry Island, in the Mississippi River in St. Paul, Minnesota, United States
