= Mink Island (St. George Parish) =

Island in New Brunswick, Canada

Geography
- Location: Bay of Fundy

Administration
- Canada
- Province: New Brunswick
- County: Charlotte
- Parish: Saint George Parish

Mink Island is an undeveloped island in the Saint George Parish of Charlotte County, New Brunswick, Canada in the Bay of Fundy.

It is one of four small islands surrounding Cailiff Island that make up the Frye Island Nature Preserve, administered by the Nature Trust of New Brunswick.

It is steep on its north side, and should not be approached within 200 metres on its Eastern side.

Southeast of Mink Island is "Mare Rock".

As of 1923, it had a buoy associated with the island.
