= Spruce Island (Bay of Fundy) =

Island in New Brunswick, Canada

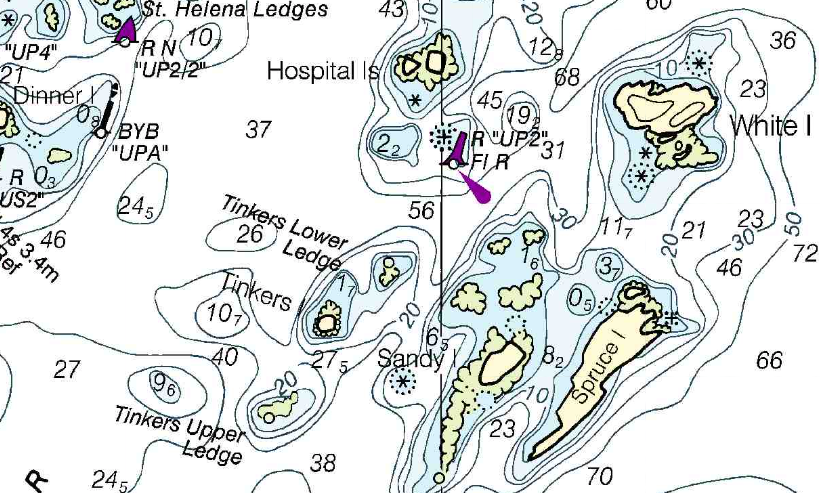
- Interactive map of Spruce Island

Geography
- Location: Bay of Fundy
- Coordinates: 44°58′21″N 66°54′27″W

Administration
- Canada
- Province: New Brunswick
- County: Charlotte
- Parish: West Isles Parish

Spruce Island is an undeveloped island in the West Isles Parish of Charlotte County, New Brunswick, Canada, where the Bay of Fundy enters Passamaquoddy Bay. Its name goes back to at least 1772, when it was titled Spruce Island on the survey of Thomas Wright.

It is one of the islands where a narrow belt of Devonian sandstone is found. Its eastern side is steep, and there are islets and shoals off its western side. It has been the subject of subtidal graduate studies. In 1978, Mackay noted a high species abundance and diversity here, and five other nearby islands.

As of 1839, the island was one of four belonging to the Campobello Mill and Manufacturing Company. It was one of five islands dismissed by author Abraham Gesner in 1847 as "small eminences of little importance".

In 1896, a fisherman's camp being used during lobster season on Spruce Island burned down; at the time the island belonged to Howard Johnston and Laurence Black.

On May 31st, 1911, the American schooner Fly Away and its cargo of salt was wrecked on Spruce Island, while travelling from Boston to Eastport, Maine. The schooner MK Rawley was wrecked on Spruce Island in 1914, with its six crew members rescued.

Following the 1925 wreck of the alcohol-smuggling Cora Gertie on the Bliss Islands where it struck Man O War Island, Prohibition inspectors found ten gallons of alcohol in a bog on Spruce Island where the crew had reached shore.

A 1985 study confirmed the presence of an unnamed shipwreck off the northeast corner of the island.

As of 2003, a weir was maintained at the island by Raymond Young.

The Pup is an islet to the northern side of Spruce Island.
