= Hog Island (St. George Parish) =

Island in New Brunswick, Canada

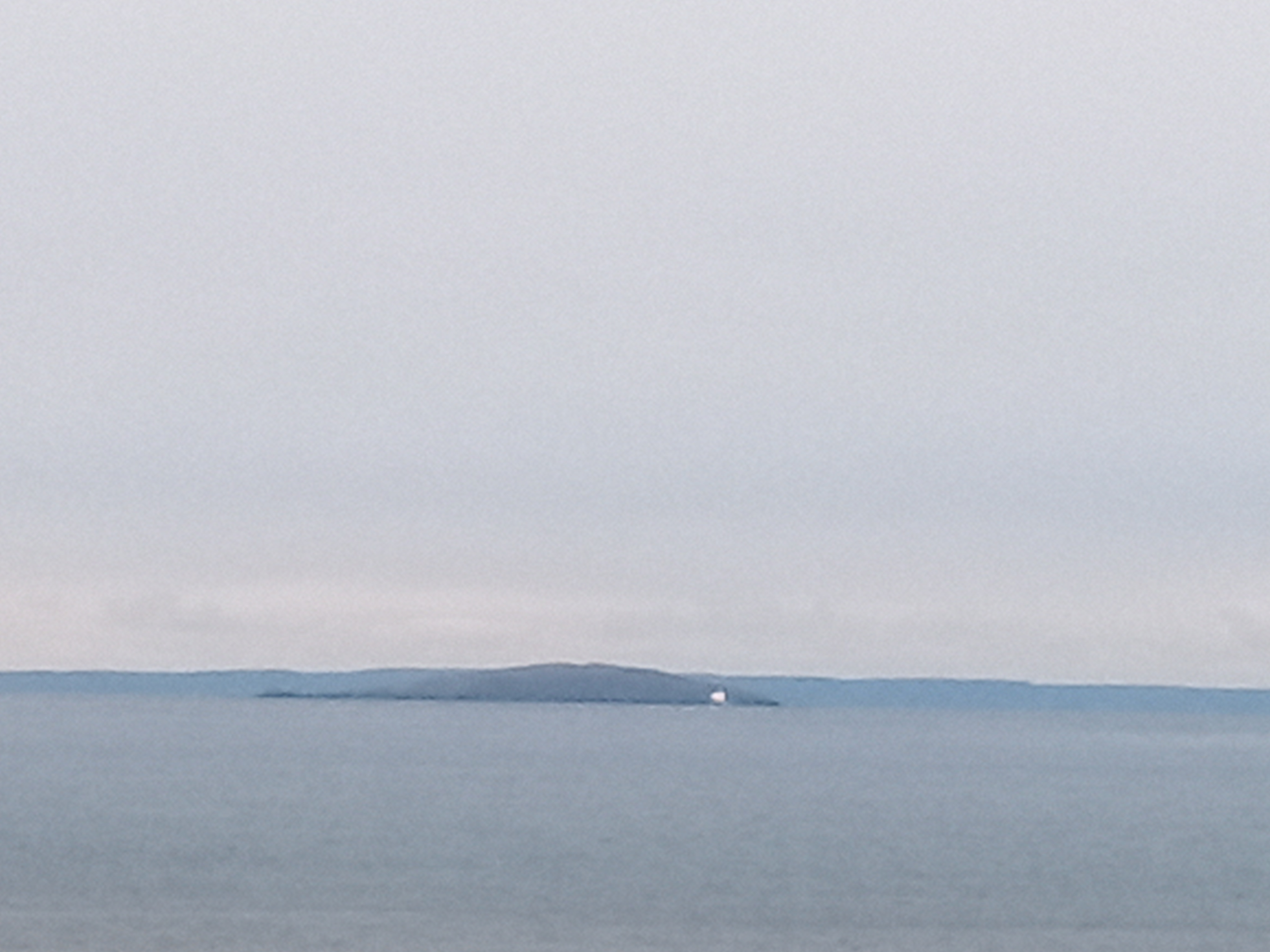
- Interactive map of Hog Island

Geography
- Location: Bay of Fundy
- Coordinates: 45°2′7″N 66°51′39″W
- Highest elevation: 12 m (39 ft)

Administration
- Canada
- Province: New Brunswick
- County: Charlotte
- Parish: Saint George Parish

Hog Island is an undeveloped island in the Saint George Parish of Charlotte County, New Brunswick, Canada in the Bay of Fundy.

It is one of four small islands surrounding Cailiff Island that make up the Frye Island Nature Preserve, administered by the Nature Trust of New Brunswick. It has Eider Duck and Cormorant populations.
