= Douglas Island (New Brunswick) =

Island in New Brunswick, Canada

Geography
- Location: Bay of Fundy

Administration
- Canada
- Province: New Brunswick
- County: Charlotte
- Parish: Saint George Parish

Douglas Island is an undeveloped island in the Saint George Parish of Charlotte County, New Brunswick, Canada in the Bay of Fundy.

It is one of four small islands surrounding Cailiff Island that make up the Frye Island Nature Preserve, administered by the Nature Trust of New Brunswick.
