= Barnes Island (New Brunswick) =

Island in New Brunswick, Canada

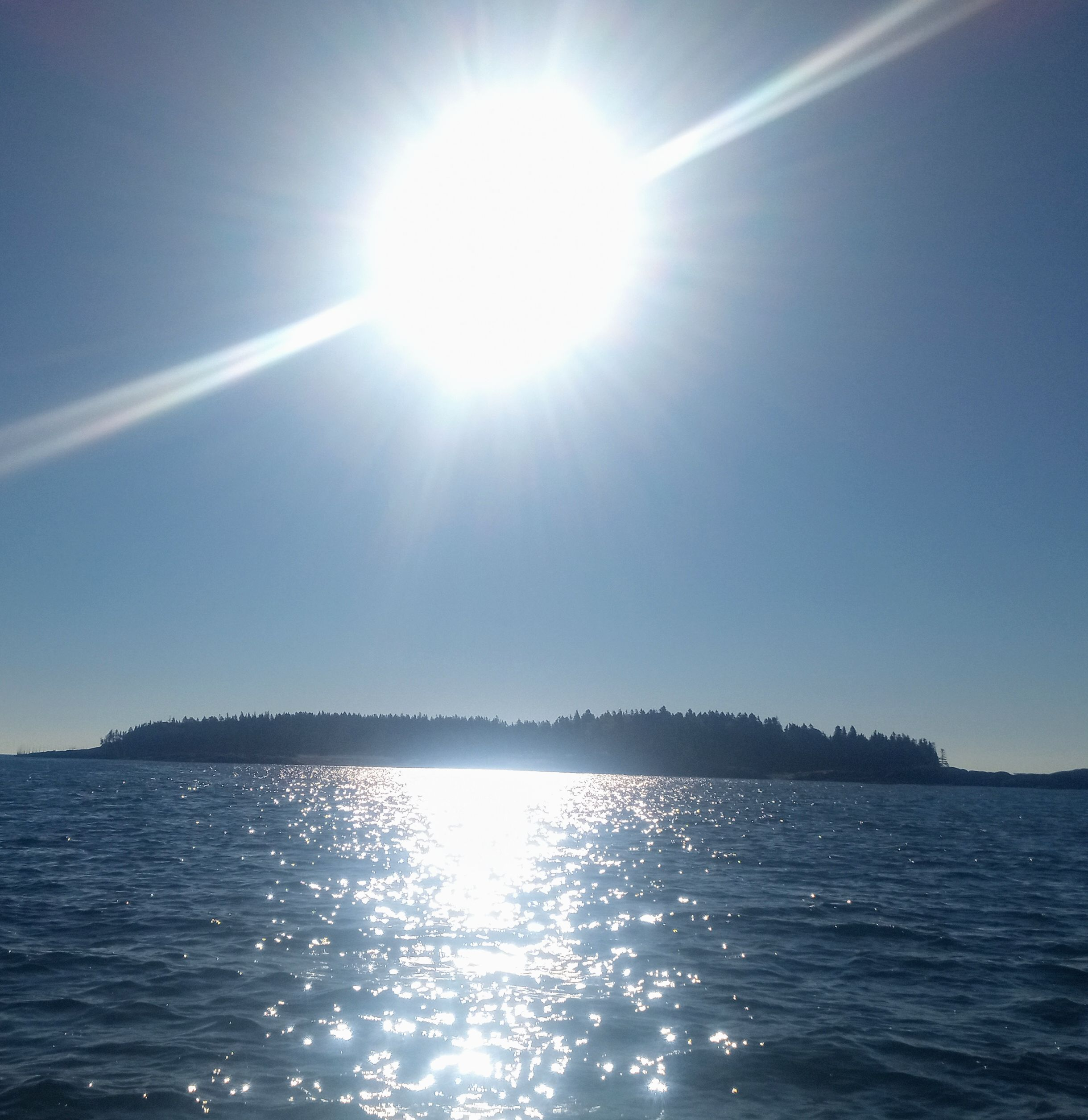
- Interactive map of Barnes Island

Geography
- Location: Bay of Fundy
- Coordinates: 45°00′18″N 66°53′59″W
- Area: 33 acres (13 ha)

Administration
- Canada
- Province: New Brunswick
- County: Charlotte
- Parish: West Isles Parish

Barnes Island (also called Barn Island) is an undeveloped 33-acre island in the West Isles Parish of Charlotte County, New Brunswick, Canada, where the Bay of Fundy enters Passamaquoddy Bay.

Covered in mixed soft and hardwood, and raspberries, the island is privately owned by the New Brunswick Land Trust with an easement for the Nature Trust of New Brunswick. It is under the protection of the Nature Conservancy of Canada.

It was closed to public camping in 1997. In 2016, 2022 and 2025 volunteers with the Trust helped clean the island's shores.

In 1974, a stranded white-sided dolphin was found on the island. In the late 1970s it was noted to no longer host previous nesting bald eagles, although it had kittiwake and osprey populations.

It was one of four islands studied in 1997 for the impact of sea kayaking on the Bay of Fundy environment. In Summer 2012, the island was one of four studied as a rockweed habitat.

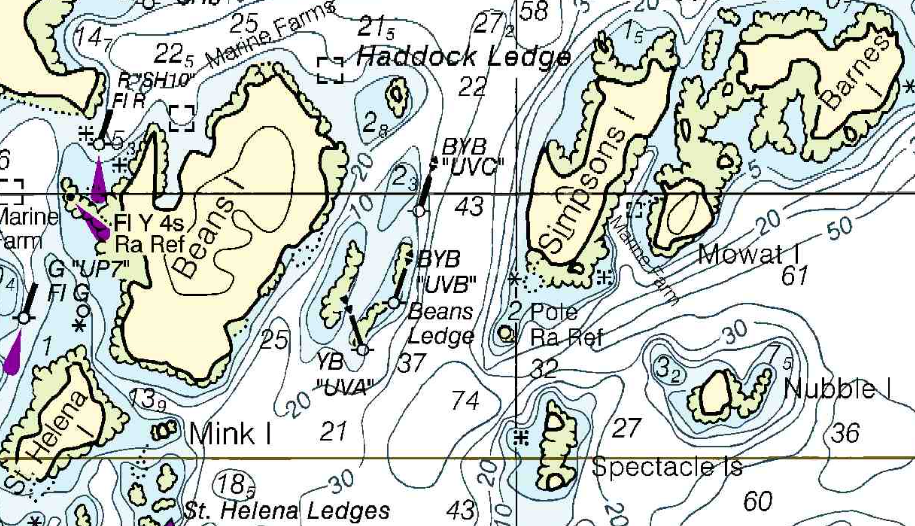
Map showing Barnes Island

Alonzo "Lon" Greenlaw was born on Barnes Island to Warren Greenlaw prior to the latter's move to Conley's Point in Leonardville. In 1884, 15-year old William Thornton died on Barnes Island after a "life marked by suffering". In 1911, US Civil War veteran Levi Call sent his sons to Deer Island for a doctor complaining of feeling ill, then retired to his bedroom on Barnes Island and killed himself with a shotgun blast to the face.

In December 1985, a study by Parks Canada assessed the island's value as $24,200.

In 2016, the island was one of the focuses of the Great Fundy Cleanup.
