= Grindstone Island (New Brunswick) =

Island in New Brunswick, Canada

- Interactive map of Grindstone Island

Geography
- Location: Bay of Fundy
- Coordinates: 45°43′24″N 64°37′0″W

Administration
- Canada
- Province: New Brunswick
- County: Albert
- Parish: Harvey

Lighthouse on Grindstone Island

Grindstone Island is an undeveloped island in the Harvey Parish, Albert County, New Brunswick, Canada.

Together with Mary's Point, it forms the Shepody Bay. Off the north end of the island was the natural anchorage for ships.

In 1823 it was granted to Saint Anne's Anglican Church.

It was part of the 1840 Second Report on the Geological Survey of New Brunswick by Abraham Gesner which found 40' long fossilized dicotyledonous trees.

There was once a quarry on the island for "superior, dark-red sandstone.

There is a conservation easement for the Nature Trust of New Brunswick.
