= William Paine (physician) =

American physician

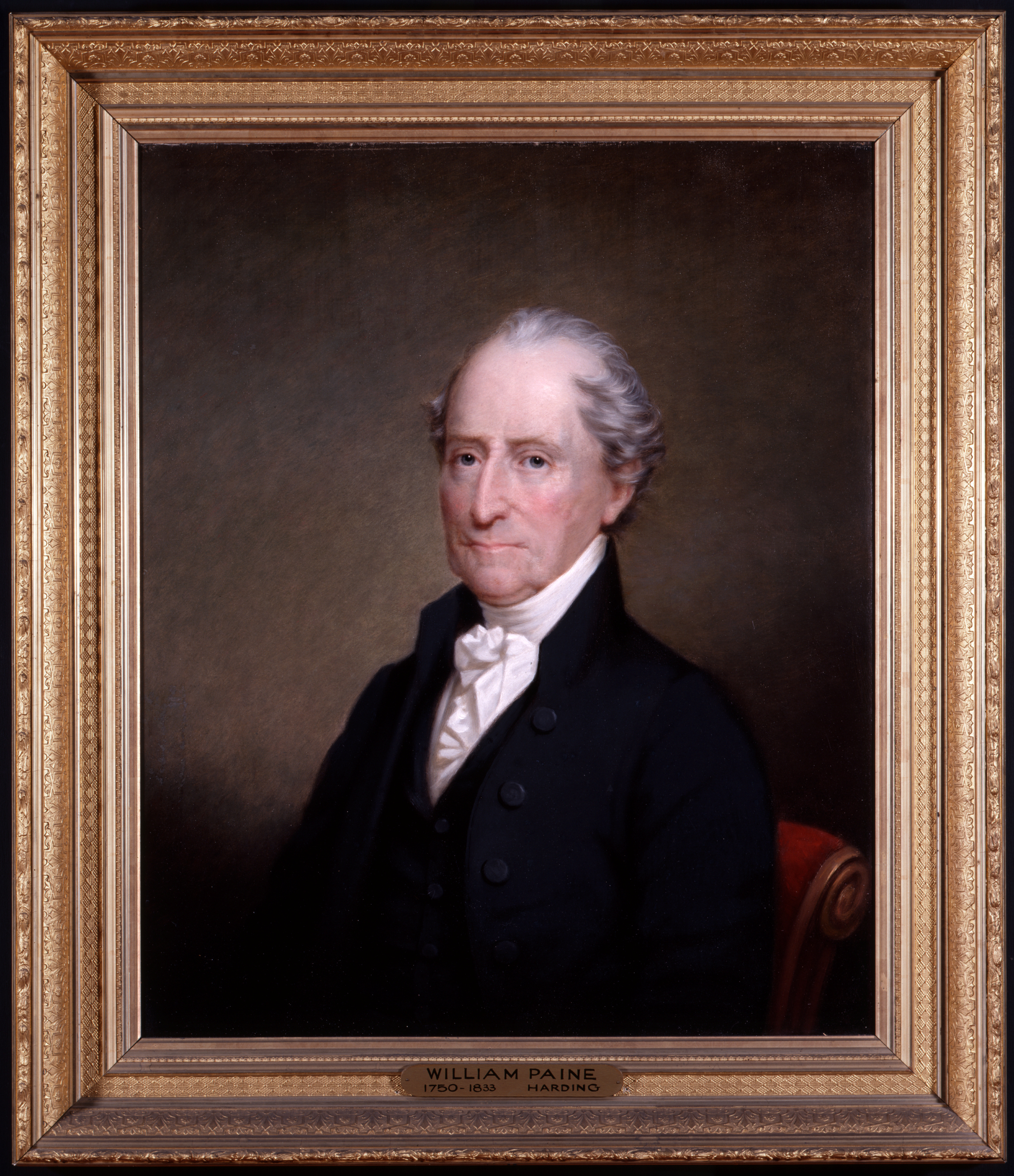
- Born: June 5, 1750; Worcester
- Died: April 19, 1833
- Education: Harvard University, Marischal College
- Occupations: Medical doctor, politician
- Awards: Fellow of the American Academy of Arts and Sciences (1791–)

William Paine (June 5, 1750 – April 19, 1833) was a medical doctor and political figure in New Brunswick. He represented Charlotte County in the Legislative Assembly of New Brunswick from 1786 to 1787. Paine was unusual in that he was a United Empire Loyalist who chose to return to the United States.

He was born in Worcester, Massachusetts, the son of Timothy Paine and Sarah Chandler. He was educated at Harvard College, then studied medicine with Doctor Edward Augustus Holyoke and set up practice in Worcester in 1771. In 1773, he married Lois Orne. In 1774, he signed a protest against the activities of the pre-revolutionary committees of correspondence. He was censured for his protest and, later that year, travelled to England to continue his medical studies. Paine received an M.D. from Marischal College in Scotland. He returned to North America and served as apothecary for the British forces.

In 1783, Paine received the Crown grant for Frye Island from Governor Parr, and in August 1784 wrote "The island will soon be a place of consequence and ultimately the principal port in British North America. But to make my situation desirable requires capital. My island must be stocked, boats must be employed in procuring lumber for the American and West India markets.

He returned to Massachusetts to settle his financial affairs there and decided to remain there, despite having been proscribed in the Massachusetts Banishment Act of 1778. He settled first at Salem and then Worcester. He was elected a Fellow of the American Academy of Arts and Sciences in 1791. In 1812, he became an American citizen. Paine became an honorary member of the Massachusetts Medical Society and was a founding member of the American Antiquarian Society. He died at Worcester at the age of 82.

He was a direct maternal ancestor to Alice Roosevelt Longworth.
