= Navy Island (Saint Andrews) =

Island in New Brunswick, Canada

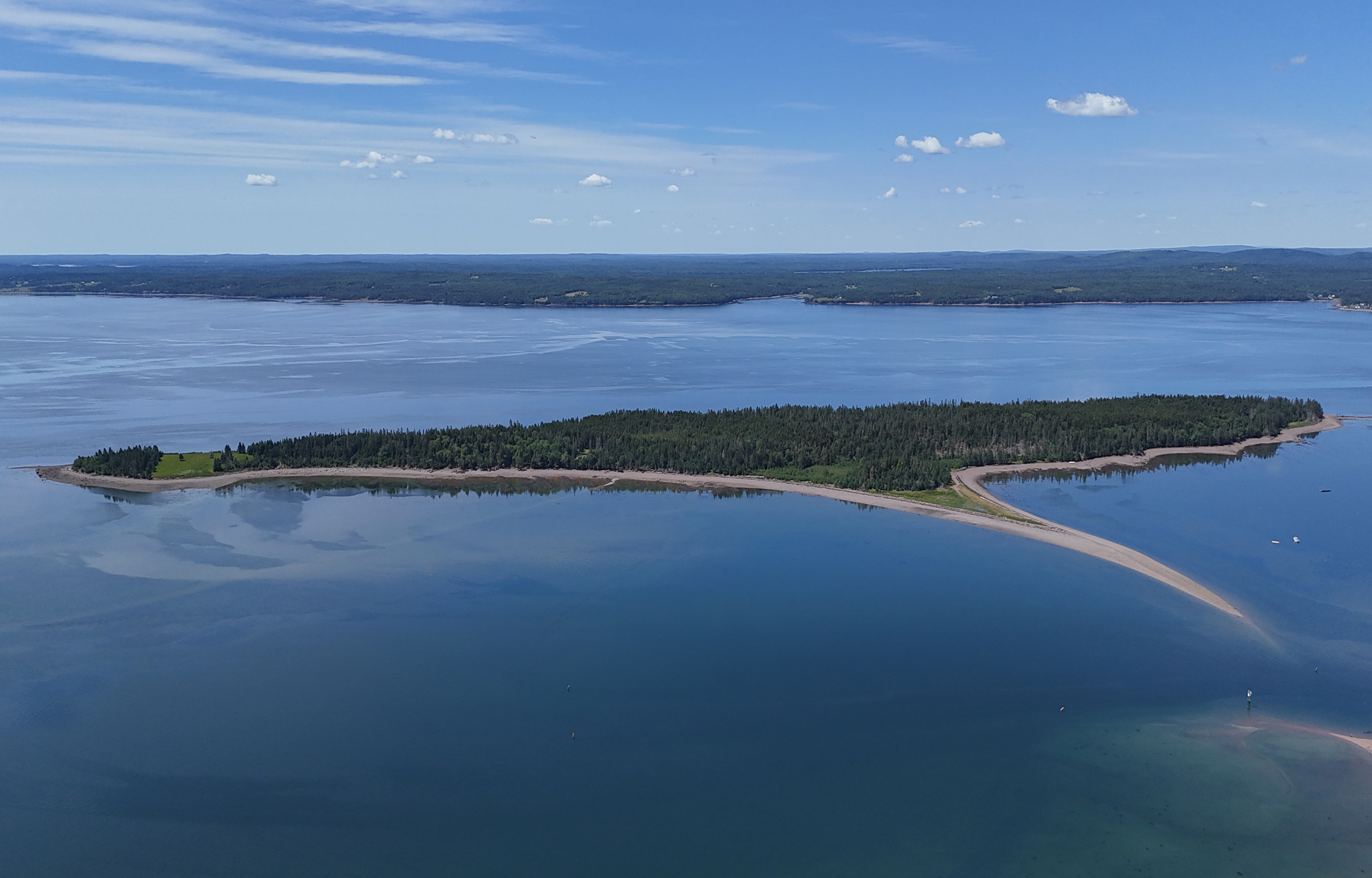
- Interactive map of Navy Island

Geography
- Location: Bay of Fundy
- Coordinates: 45°03′37″N 67°03′12″W

Administration
- Canada
- Province: New Brunswick
- County: Charlotte
- Parish: Saint Andrews Parish

Navy Island (previously termed St. Andrews Island) is an undeveloped island in the St. Andrews Parish of Charlotte County, New Brunswick, Canada in the Bay of Fundy.

Ganong noted in Mitchell's 1764 Fieldbook it was named Flatcher's Island in reference to the trader Fletcher, and on Wright's 1772 map it's labeled Saint Andrews Island, and that it "probably" had "some naval use".

In 1777, Matthew Thornton, the nephew of US founding father Matthew Thornton, spent a winter "alone with his dog and gun", on Navy Island "after fellow Freemasons helped him escape the United States and flee to Canada.

In 1821, the British Crown gave a land grant of the island to the Corporation of Saint Andrews.

A shoal extending from Navy Island was the site of a lighthouse.

There is a geodetic triangulation station on the island, 66 metres south of the ruins of a stone fence.

Approximately half the island is owned by the Nature Trust of New Brunswick, after funds were raised including through a public auction to support its purchase. In 2016, the island was one of the focuses of the Great Fundy Cleanup.

There is a cemetery on the northeast boundary of the preserve.
