= Frye Island (New Brunswick) =

Island in New Brunswick, Canada

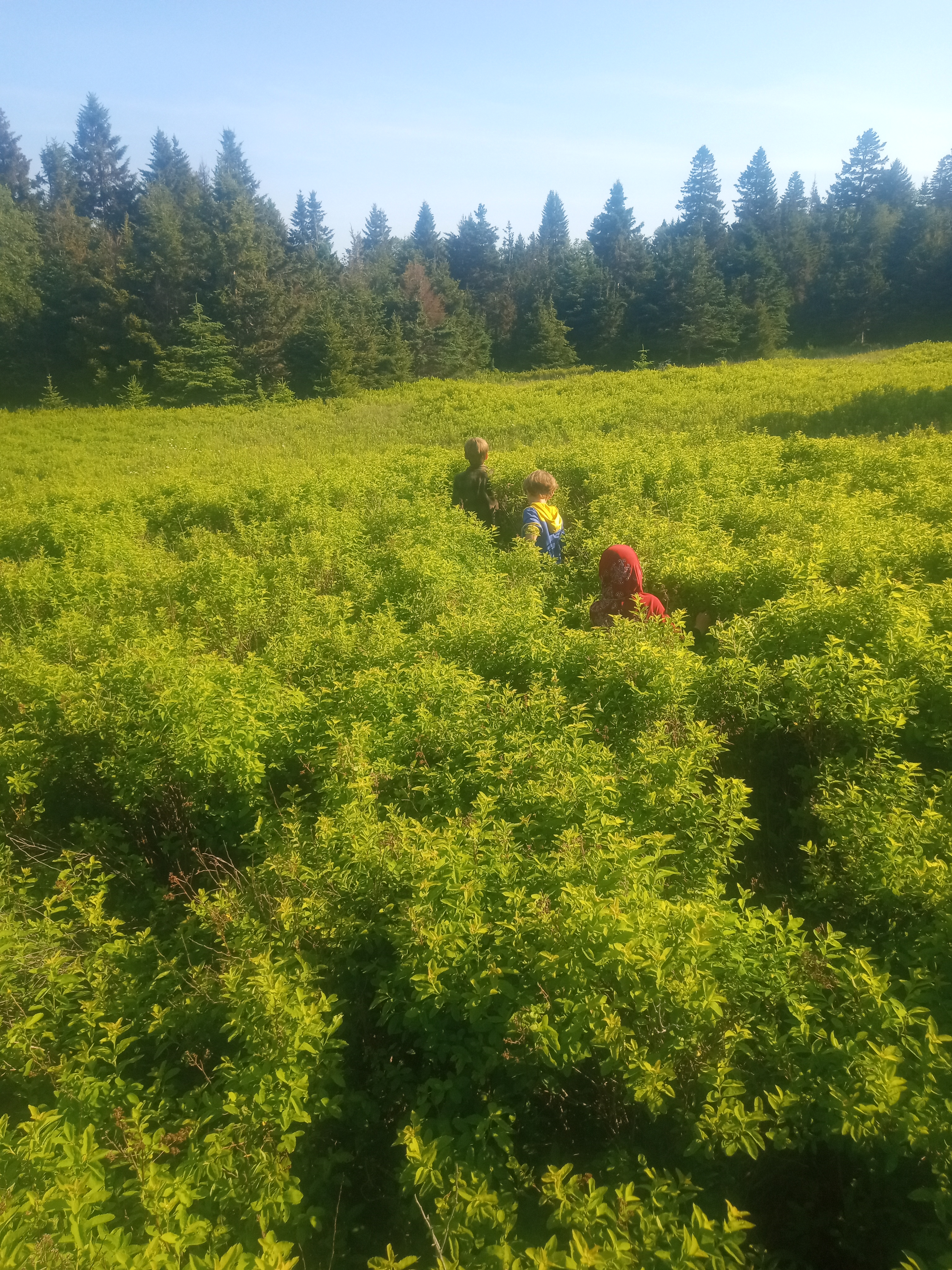
- Children on Frye Island

- Location within New Brunswick

Geography
- Location: Bay of Fundy
- Coordinates: 45°03′22″N 66°50′39″W
- Area: 381 ha (940 acres)

Administration
- Canada
- Province: New Brunswick
- County: Charlotte
- Parish: St. George Parish

Frye Island (formerly known as Letete Island, Paine's Island, Cailiff Island and L'Etang Island) is a 940-acre (380 ha) island situated in the Passamaquoddy Bay, between Blacks Harbour and Letang, in New Brunswick, Canada.

It is the largest uninhabited island in the Bay of Fundy.

== Geography ==
Its primary tree cover is red spruce and speckled alder, with white spruce, balsam fir, pin cherry and white birch also appearing. Off its southern tip, ledges connect Frye Island to Morans Island, which connects to Eagle Island and Spruce Island, the latter then connecting to Pain Island.

The southeastern edge of the island is sandstone with interbedded shale.

== History ==
In 1783, Dr. William Paine received the Crown grant for Frye Island from Governor Parr, and in August 1784 wrote "The island will soon be a place of consequence and ultimately the principal port in British North America. But to make my situation desirable requires capital. My island must be stocked, boats must be employed in procuring lumber for the American and West India markets.

Irish immigrant Timothy O'Connor had arrived in New Brunswick after serving in the British Army and was granted 4,000 acres on Whittier Ridge; he ultimately moved to Bliss Island, where he died – leading his family to relocate to a place called Connor's Beach on Frye Island (then called L'Etang Island). His grandsons Patrick and Lewis Jr formed the Connors Brothers Limited seafood company, on the mainland.

From 1820 onward Jedediah Cailiff lived on the island, which took on his name as an alternate name.

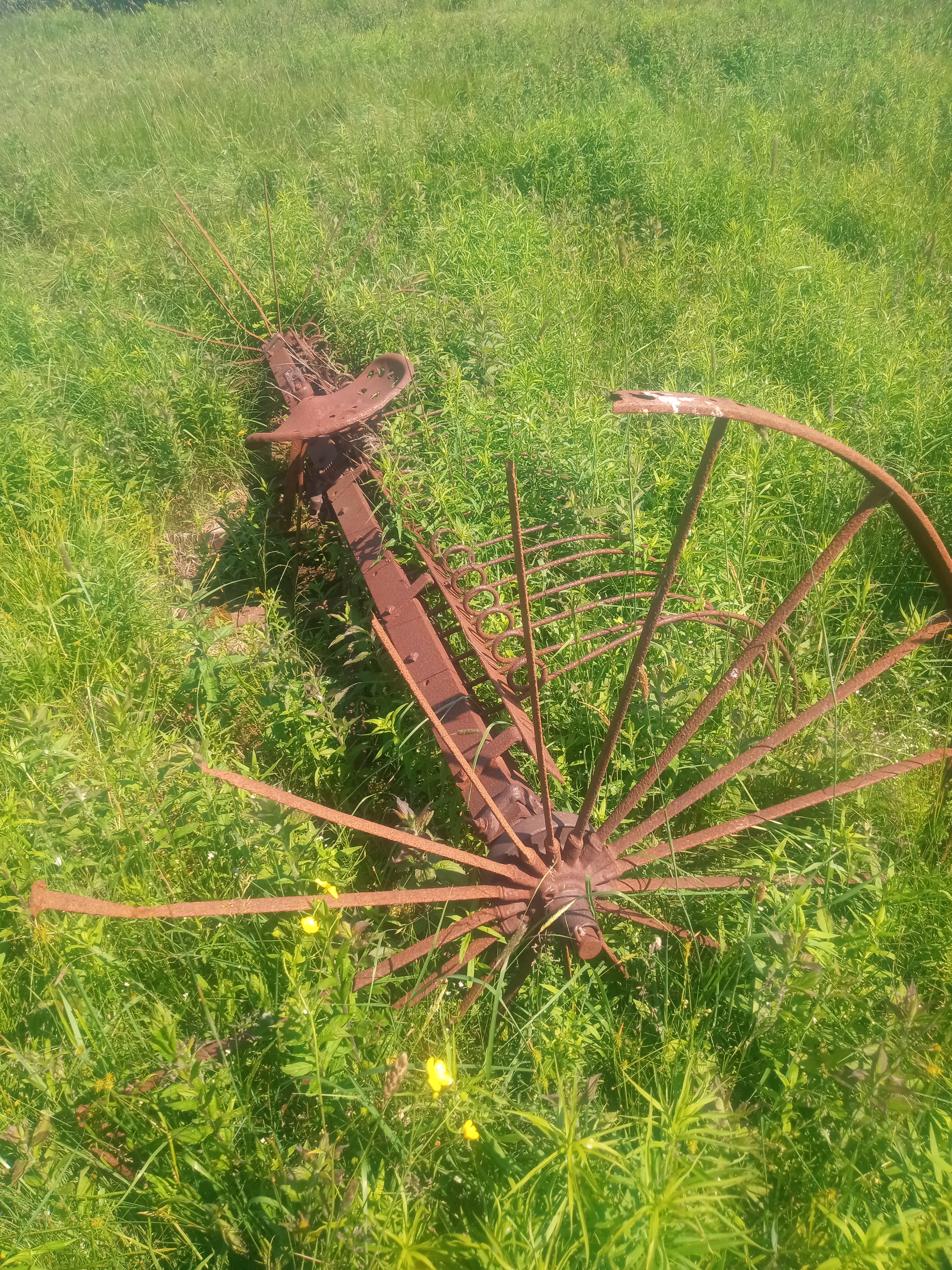
The ruins of antique farm equipment on Frye Island

Dr. Henry Frye, who served on Hospital Island, also built a quarry on the mineral-rich island, which is more easily accessible to the mainland during low tide, to accompany his kiln in Letang, and the island became alternatively named for him. Three lodes of lead ore were noted on the island, along with deposits of calc spar, heavy spar, fluor, serpentine, verde antique, asbestos, and iron pyrites. In 1869, Dr. Frye continued seeking ownership of the island landing in front of a Special Committee of legislature, along with the Attorney General.

The ruins of a homestead and an 1852 grave remain on the island. Spencer Fullerton Baird carried out a 19th century archaeological study of the island. It is noted to have "its share of mystery" involving alleged ghost sightings around the old home.

In 1871, Henry Frye of St. George gave permission for the gathering of "interesting suites of fossils" from the island.

In 1896 and 1900, the island was the site of the YMCA's Maritime Boys' Camp.

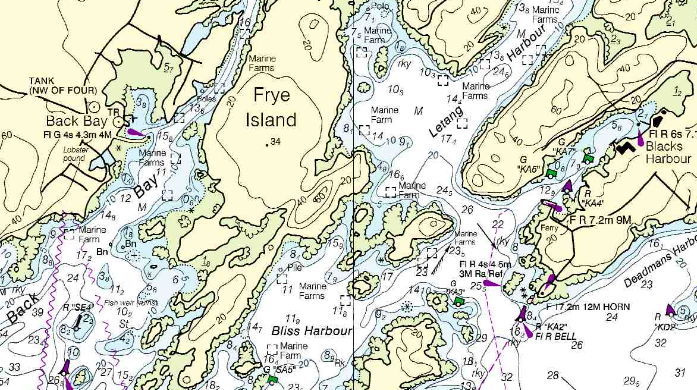
NOAA chart of Frye Island

Ten members of the Frye family disputed ownership of the island, and the Court ordered it auctioned with the proceeds evenly divided between them. In 1916, the chain of ownership was listed as having been granted to Dr. Cailiff, and afterward owned by William Paine who dubbed it Letete Island and conveyed i tto Samuel Frye, who left it to his son Samuel Frye in 1847 - and that it was Henry Frye who farmed extensively and raised animals.

In April 1928, the Connors Brothers Limited purchased the island for $51,200, and opened a new sister company, Frye's Island Corporation Ltd, also specializing in seafood based on the island and controlling the 20 weir licenses around the island. A large house was built on the island to entertain politicians and notable members of the sardine industry.

In 2010, Connors Brothers put Cailiff Island and 12 other islands up for sale, noting that they were no longer economically viable for aquaculture and fishing purposes. Ultimately half of the island, along with Hog, Douglas, Eagle and Mink islets off its shores, formed the Frye Island Nature Preserve in 2015 after the land was donated to the Nature Trust of New Brunswick by Connors Brothers.
