= Letang Island Nature Preserve =

Island in New Brunswick, Canada

Cochranes Island
- Interactive map of Cochranes Island

Geography
- Location: Bay of Fundy
- Coordinates: 45.083°N 66.798°W

Administration
- Canada
- Province: New Brunswick
- County: Charlotte
- Parish: Saint George Parish

The Letang Island Nature Preserve is a series of islands and coastal properties in the Letang Harbour in the Saint George Parish of Charlotte County, New Brunswick, Canada in the Bay of Fundy.

It specifically includes the six Park Islands and Cochrane Island.

The Park Islands were formerly known as the "Goat Islands".
