= Manawagonish Island =

Island in New Brunswick, Canada

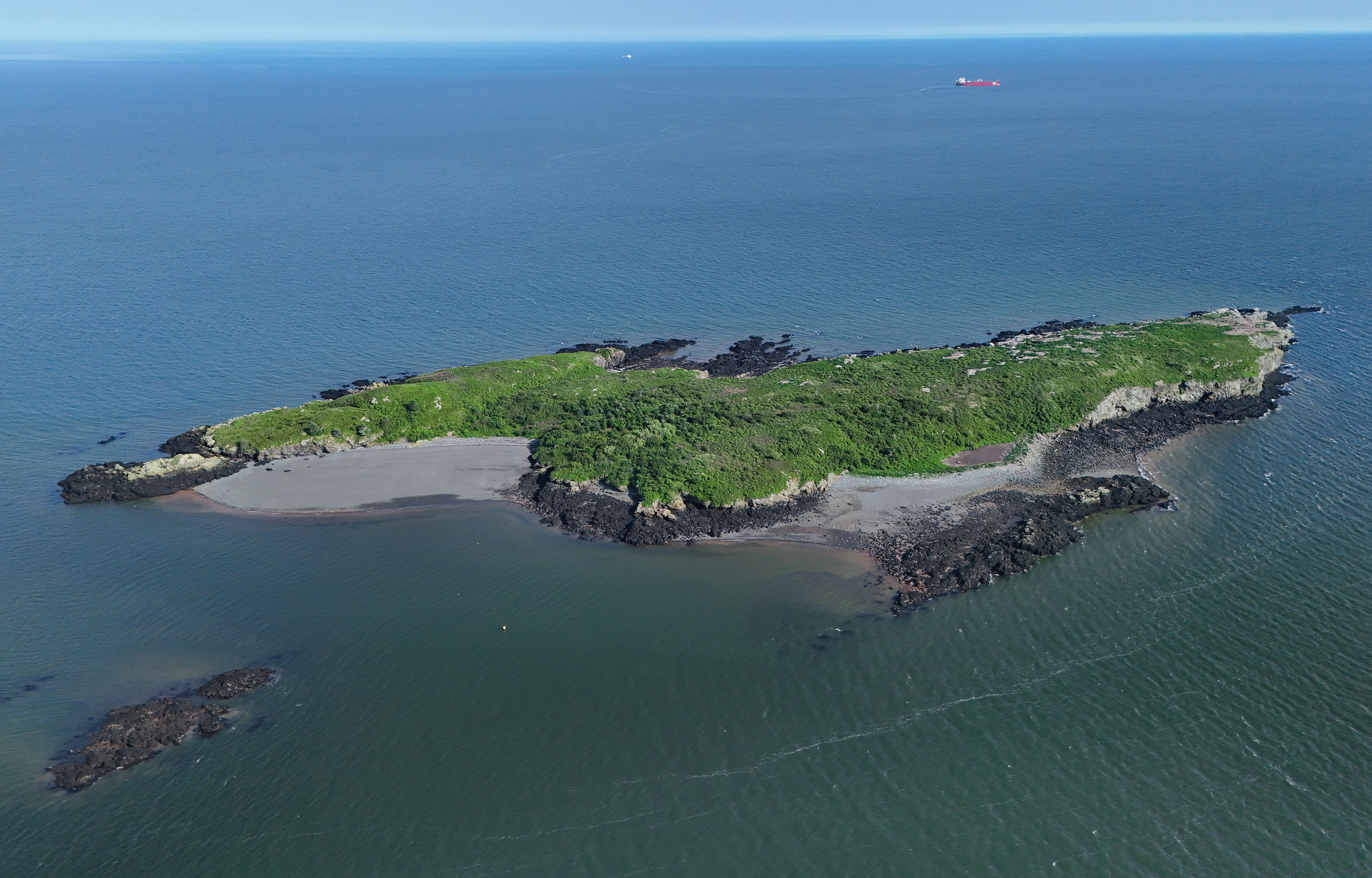
- Interactive map of Manawagonish Island

Geography
- Location: Bay of Fundy
- Coordinates: 45°12′29″N 66°06′31″W

Administration
- Canada
- Province: New Brunswick
- County: Saint John

Manawagonish Island (also known as Mahogany Island) is an island in the city of Saint John, Saint John County, New Brunswick, Canada.

Located 1.5km from Saint's Rest Beach, it is a protected bird sanctuary owned by the Nature Trust of New Brunswick. The Shag Rocks lie to the immediate west.

== History ==
In 1786 the island was granted to Loyalists John Coleville, Nahum Jones, William and Thomas Pagan. Its name Manawagonish was labeled as the Passamaquoddy term "Place for Clams" by William Francis Ganong.

After Thomas Pagan gave up his share for two doubloons, John Coleville sold his share to Andrew Crookshank, and it was later inherited by his son Robert and his grandson Otty, following which it was given in trust to Montgomery McDonald who put at public auction where it was purchased by A.A. Wilson with attached lobster-fishing rights, although there was legal dispute whether McDonald had the right to sell the island..

In 1851, police intercepted 400 gallons of smuggled American liquor at Manawagonish Island.

In 1878, a newspaper claimed it was the site of Captain Kidd's buried treasure, also locally rumored to be on Deer Island, New Brunswick a distance to the west. It was also claimed to have one abandoned house on it, allegedly haunted.

In 1887, the Rapid was wrecked. In 1888, the HS Taylor was wrecked off Manawagonish Island.

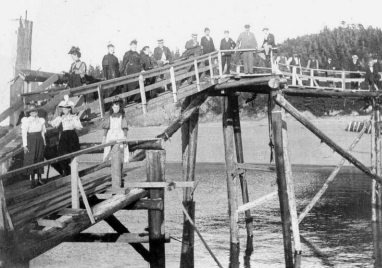
The boat-landing wharf on Manawagonish Island, circa 1900

In July 1916, T. E. Estabrooks president of Red Rose Tea took staff for a clam bake on the island.

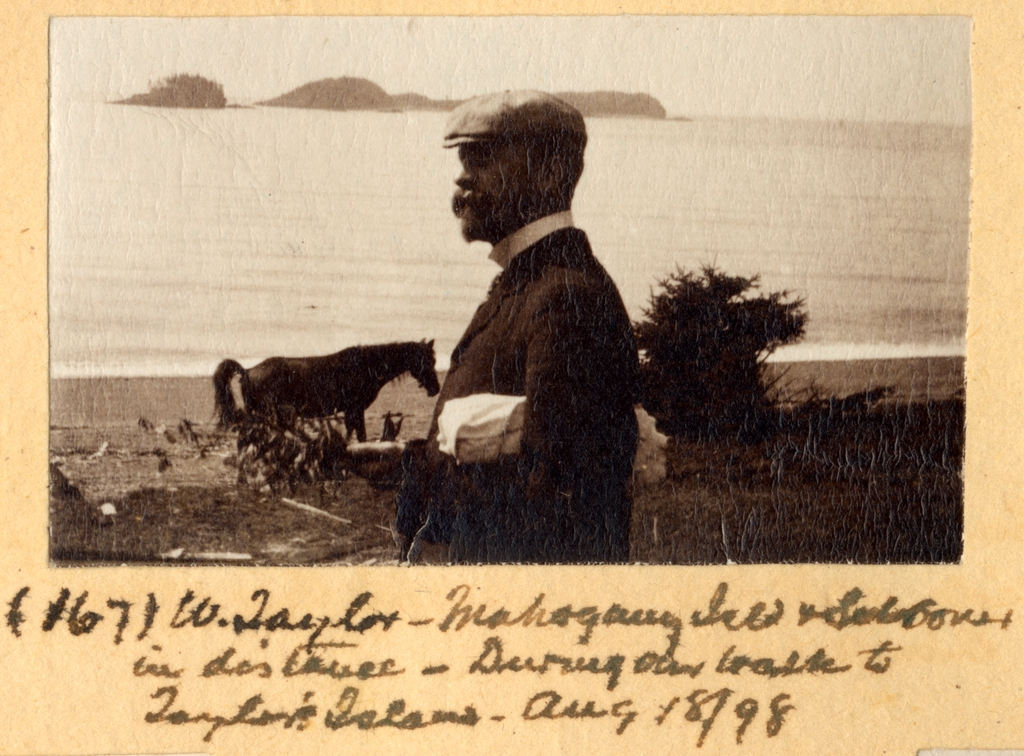
Walter Taylor photographed in 1898 with Manawagonish Island in the background

In 1987, more than 2% of the Atlantic population of double-crested cormorants were recorded on Manawagonish Island. In 1986, Glossy Ibis tried unsuccessfully to nest on the island, the only known time in Canada.

It was privately owned until 1991, when it was donated to the Nature Trust by the children of Dr. Kenneth and Miriam Wilson.
