= Man o'War Island =

Island in New Brunswick, Canada

- Interactive map of Man o'War Island

Geography
- Location: Bay of Fundy

Administration
- Canada
- Province: New Brunswick
- County: Charlotte
- Parish: Saint George Parish

Man o'War Island is an undeveloped island in the Saint George Parish of Charlotte County, New Brunswick, Canada in the Bay of Fundy. It is at the mouth of L'etang Harbour.

There are aquaculture sites off of Man o'War Island, including owned by Kelly Cove Aquaculture.

As of 1923, it had two buoys associated with the island.

In October 1925, Harry Stone's two-masted schooner Cora Gertie sank with no lives lost, in a gale after being blown into Bliss Harbour and striking Man o'War Island. It had been parked 12 miles off the coast to sell smuggled White Horse whiskey which was salvaged from the sunken wreck. Prohibition inspectors found ten gallons of alcohol in a bog on Spruce Island where the crew had reached shore.
