= Alfons Grieder =

Swiss drummer known for promoting the Basel Drumming style

- Born: 1939; Basel, Switzerland
- Died: April 13, 2003 (aged 63–64)
- Occupations: Insurance Advisor, Drummer, Music Teacher, Author
- Spouse: Vreni Grieder
- Children: Isabel, Evelyn
- Writing career
- Years active: 1960s - 2003
- Subject: Basel Drumming

Alfons Grieder was a Swiss rudimental drummer who spread awareness of the Basel Drumming style in America during the mid to late 20th century through his traveling, teaching, and publications.

== Biography ==
Grieder was born in Basel, Switzerland in 1939 and began studying Basel style snare drumming with Dr. Fritz Berger in 1949. He came to the United States in the 1950s to study classical percussion with teachers like Saul Goodman and Morris Goldenberg. Starting in 1957, Greider worked with Dutch drummer Rob Verhagen to organize Basel drumming workshops in The Netherlands.

In the 1960s he visited the Deep River Drum Corps's annual muster, reportedly inspiring the corps to start a subsidiary group called the Swiss Mariners. At the muster he noticed that the ancient American Fife and Drum Corps tradition was very similar to that of his native Basel. Grieder eventually took American Ancient drumming back to Switzerland and taught Swiss drummers to play in the American style. He would later tour around the United States visiting other drum corps teaching and promoting Fritz Berger's version of Swiss drumming.

In 1968, he had an article published in the Ludwig Drummer periodical about Swiss rudiments, which he followed in 1969 with a vinyl LP, demonstrating the Swiss Basel style of drumming, entitled, Das Basler Trommeln. Swiss rudiments have been incorporated into both the PAS 40 International Drum Rudiments of 1984, and into several Drum Corps International hybrid rudiments because of Grieder's and his mentor Berger's teaching and promotion of the Swiss style.

Grieder's goal in America was to become a professional orchestral percussionist, and he did indeed perform and record Rolf Liebermann's Geigy Festival Concerto several times, but was unable to sustain a career in percussion performance. He also worked as an insurance analyst to fill the gap. Back in Switzerland he became a member of the Fastnacht Society and was the director of their drum school for many years. In 1974, Greider performed at a Basel event called the Sticksland Meeting Two, which was captured as a live audio recording by George Gruntz. He also appeared at the Internationales Schlagzeug- und Percussion-festival in Metzingen, Germany in 1996 with the Basler Trommel-Ensemble.

Grieder performed at the Percussion Creativ Symposium and Hanover, and in November 2002, he performed at the Percussive Arts Society International Convention with the American Basel-style ensemble Americlique. A few months later, in April 2003, he died of cancer.

Among Grieder's students are drum book author and orchestral percussionist Steve Fitch, snare drummer, instructor, and composer Ben Dijkgraaf, President of The Pipes and Drums of Basel Gilbert Widmer, and Arkansas State University professor of percussion Craig Collison.

== Publications ==
- Dr Dudelsagg : e Marsch fir 3 Piccolo : [op. 7] Musical composition
- Das Basler Trommeln Book
- Das Basler Trommeln Vinyl Recording
- Monster Sticksland Meeting Two Vinyl recording
- Geigy Festival Concerto CD Recording
- Maître de tambour CD recording
