= Open, closed, open =

Technique of playing snare drum rudiments

Open, closed, open is a technique of playing snare drum rudiments, especially used during auditions or classical practice routines.

== Technique ==
"Open, closed, open," also referred to as "open to close to open," or "slow, fast, slow," consists of beginning a drum rudiment very slow and controlled, speeding up evenly until at the maximum speed for the drummer, then slowing back down after maintaining that speed. Optimally, the drummer should end on the opposite hand as started, in case of alternating rudiments such as paradiddles. The speed at which the exercise ends should be the same speed as the exercise began. The time taken to accelerate to maximum speed should be equal to the time taken to decelerate to the beginning speed so that the exercise is symmetrical. The exercise should last one to two minutes with each individual rudiment, depending on the skill and stamina of the player, so that 30 seconds to one minute consists of acceleration and then a corresponding 30 seconds to one minute consists of deceleration.

It is recommended that once a rudiment is learned, as far as the technical sticking and accents, that it be practiced regularly with the open, closed, open technique as well as at a moderate march tempo to ensure that a drummer or percussionist is able to play the rudiment accurately at any speed necessary for performance of musical repertoire.

The most difficult rudiments to play in this manner are those with continuous patterns (no breaks or rests) such as the single stroke roll, double stroke roll, and triple stroke roll, due to the requirement for the sound to stay smooth and even while the technique used for playing the strokes changes with speed.

== History ==
Rudiments were typically practiced open to closed in the early 19th century and before. Samuel Potter's book, The Art of Beating the Drum from 1817 recommends that rudiments be played "until perfectly close," but there is no mention of opening them back up again. It wasn't until 1862 that George Barrett Bruce recommended playing rudiments in the open, closed, open method. When the National Association of Rudimental Drummers was codifying their 26 rudiments in 1933, there was discussion amongst the original 13 members about whether to recommend open, closed, open or only open to closed in their teaching due to the presence of both methods in the existing literature of the time. Open, closed, open eventually won out and has been the standard practice ever since, also appearing on the Percussive Arts Society official rudiment sheet from 1984.
