= Jay Wanamaker =

American percussionist

- Born: 1955 (age 70–71); New York
- Education: BME - SUNY Potsdam, MM - Kansas University, Master of Management - Aquinas Grand Rapids
- Occupations: President and CEO Roland Americas
- Known for: PAS Rudiments Committee, Instructional Drum Books, Instrument Retail Management Expertise
- Notable work: Drum Rudiment Dictionary, Championship Corps-Style Contest Solos
- Style: Rudimental Drumming

Jay Wanamaker is a percussionist and the president and CEO of Roland Americas and formerly held executive positions at Fender and Guitar Center. He also worked for Yamaha, Alfred Publishing, and the University of Southern California, and was chair of the Percussive Arts Society rudimental committee that published the 40 PAS Drum rudiments. He has also published over 50 music books and instructional DVDs.

== Biography ==
Jay Wanamaker was given a drum set by his uncle and by 4th grade was playing in a local drum corps in Utica, New York He earned his bachelor's of music education at the Crane School of Music at SUNY Potsdam in 1977 and went on to earn his Masters of Music at the University of Kansas in 1980. He then took a job teaching the marching band at the University of Southern California's Thornton School of Music from 1981 to 1985. Concurrently, in the early 80s Wanamaker was working for Alfred Publishing as an editor of musical instruction materials and was serving on the Percussive Arts Society's rudimental percussion committee. In 1984, while serving as chair of the committee, he and the other members published the PAS 40 International Snare Drum Rudiments, which are currently the standard American drum rudiments for teaching and learning the drums. Other prominent committee members included Fred Sanford, Marty Hurley, John H. Beck, Anthony Cirone, William F. Ludwig Jr., Rob Carson, and other music professors, industry executives, and notable percussionists. Also in 1984, he published one of his most popular books, Championship Corps-Style Contest Solos. From 1985 to 2000, Wanamaker worked for Yamaha in various divisions, eventually becoming a Vice President. He then moved to Guitar Center for 10 years, where he worked as an Executive Vice President for Merchandise. He then spent 2 years with Fender and 6 months with Amati before attaining his current position in 2015 as the CEO and President of Roland Americas. After entering the corporate world he continued to publish drum books with Alfred, including rudimental solo collections and drum rudiment guides. Wanamaker has worked on Super Bowl halftime shows and his music is featured in the film Drumline.

== Publications ==
- Championship Auxiliary Units
- Championship Corps-Style Contest Solos
- International Drum Rudiments Book
- International Drum Rudiments DVD
- Alfred's Rudimental Duets
- Alfred's Rudimental Contest Solos
- Alfred's Intermediate Snare Drum Solos
- Drum Rudiment Dictionary
- Corps-Style Drum Dictionary
- Corps-Style Cadences
