= Gardiner A. Strube =

- Occupations: Drummer, Drum Major, Author, U.S. Army NCO
- Writing career
- Period: 19th Century
- Genre: drum instruction
- Notable works: Strube's Drum and Fife Instructor

Gardiner A. Strube was an American drum major in the New York National Guard and the author of a fife and drum manual.

== Career ==
Gardiner Strube served as a drummer in Duryee's Zouaves, also known as the 5th New York Volunteer Infantry, during the Civil War. After the war, he served in the Twelfth Regiment, Infantry, N.G.S.N.Y as the Drum Major. While in the 12th, he wrote Strube's Drum and Fife Instructor which was approved by the Secretary of War John A. Rawlins in 1869 for use in the Army of the United States. Strube would later serve as an election inspector for the City of New York in 1874.

William F. Ludwig held Strube's Instructor in high regard, along with Bruce and Emmett's 1862 book saying, "Both of these instructors should receive equal credit for the firm establishment of the drum rudiments we have today." The National Association of Rudimental Drummers, which Ludwig helped found, based their 26 Standard American Rudiments on Strube's 25 Lessons from the Instructor with just a single additional rudiment. Strube's 25 Lessons, while influential, were actually a truncated version of Bruce and Emmett who themselves had removed several traditional American rudiments from the vocabulary they presented in their book. Nonetheless, the Strube rudiments were also the basis for the Percussive Arts Society's 1984 list of 40 International Drum Rudiments.

== Publications ==
- Strube's Drum and Fife Instructor
