= John S. Pratt =

American drummer

- Born: John Sterling Pratt; January 13, 1931; Seneca Falls, New York
- Died: April 6, 2020 (age 89)
- Occupations: Author, Drum Instructor - US Military Academy, English teacher
- Writing career
- Period: 1949-2009
- Genres: Drum and Percussion Instruction
- Notable work: 14 Modern Contest Solos for Snare Drum
- Notable awards: PAS Hall of Fame, World Drum Corps Hall of Fame

John Sterling "Jack" Pratt (1931–2020) was an American Army drum instructor at West Point as well as a celebrated rudimental book author. Pratt produced several volumes of rudimental solos and instructional materials and was also the founder of the International Association of Traditional Drummers (IATD), a member of the National Association of Rudimental Drummers (NARD), a member of the United States Association of Rudimental Drummers (USARD), and was inducted into the Percussive Arts Society (PAS) Hall of Fame and the World Drum Corps Hall of Fame.

== Biography ==
John Pratt was born in 1931 at Seneca Falls, New York, started playing the drums at the age of 10, and began his rudimental training at a local VFW post in 1947. In 1949, he officially became a member of NARD by playing the 13 essential drum rudiments in front of an existing member. He joined the US Army in 1950 and received Army musical training at Fort Knox with the 3rd Armored Division Band training program. Pratt then auditioned and was accepted into the West Point Field Music Unit, also known as the Hellcats Drum and Bugle Corps, for which he became the Rudimental Drum Instructor and Arranger in 1959. Also in 1959 he was accepted as a National Examiner for rudimental contests and published his first 3 books including his most famous work, 14 Modern Contest Solos for Snare Drum, following those first three closely with another book, 26 Standard American Drum Rudiments in 1960. In addition to teaching at West Point he worked with the Interstatesmen and Gray Knights drum corps during this period. Pratt retired from the Army and graduated with a degree in English from Fairleigh Dickinson University in 1969. He would then start a second career as an English teacher in Hackensack, New Jersey, that would last until 1995. From 1972 to 1981 he taught the drum line of the Hawthorne Caballeros Drum and Bugle Corps and won many major drum line awards. He published several more books through the 1980s and 1990s. Despite triple-bypass heart surgery in 2000, he performed at the PASIC convention in 2001 and was inducted into the Percussive Arts Society Hall of Fame in 2002. Pratt founded the International Association of Rudimental Drummers in 2004 to combat what he felt was an influx of foreign rudiments into American drumming. In 2009, Pratt was awarded a lifetime membership to the United States Association of Rudimental Drummers. Pratt died on April 6, 2020, from an unknown cause. Among his famous and influential students are Dennis DeLucia and Leopold Stokowski. Although he was a strong proponent of rudimental drumming he was quoted as saying, "Drum rudiments are exercises. The rudiments of drumming are strokes," giving deference to the basic 4 drum strokes over any rudimental patterns.

== Publications ==
- 14 Modern Contest Solos for Snare Drum
- Ancient Rudimental Snare and Bass Drum Solos
- 128 Rudimental Street Beats
- 26 Standard American Drum Rudiments
- The Solo Snare Drummer
- The New Pratt Book
- Rudimental Solos for Accomplished Drummers
