= Fritz Berger (percussionist) =

Swiss drum teacher (b. 1895, d. 1963)

- Born: 1895; Switzerland
- Died: 1963, (aged 68)
- Occupations: Author, Drummer, Teacher
- Writing career
- Period: 1928-1963
- Genres: Drum and Percussion Instruction

Fritz Berger was a Swiss drum teacher and drum method book author. He wrote several influential books on Swiss rudimental drumming, or Basler Trommeln, that are still thought of as the authoritative sources for Swiss drumming in America.

== Biography ==
Dr. Fritz Robert Berger was born in 1895 in Switzerland and is sometimes referred to as the "Drummel-Doggter". His middle name is sometimes given as Rudolf. He studied the Basel style of snare drumming, called Basler Trommeln or Basle Trommel, and published his book Das Basler Trommeln : nebst vollständigem Lehrgang und einer Sammlung aller Basler Trommelmärsche in 1928. He also published article called Das Basler Trommeln, Werden und Wesen in 1936. His books and other publications outlined the Swiss Basel rudimental system in a novel notation system that was much easier to read for drummers from outside of the Basel tradition. Previously, Basel notation had been either onomatopoetic, using syllables written out in letters to represent the rhythms, or later a set of symbols or hieroglyphics. Neither system used the normal elements of western music notation. Berger's monolinear notation system used established musical note values and symbols and placed them on a single-line staff. Similarly to other rudimental notation systems in America, and France, Scotland, and other parts of Switzerland, his system placed right hand notes above the line and the left hand notes below it so that the sticking was obvious.

In the 1930s, Berger exchanged ideas with drummers in North America and Scotland, promoting his Basel rudimental style to various drum corps, marching bands, and rudimental percussionists who had largely not been familiar with Basel drumming before. Berger's Swiss student Alfons Grieder continued to promote Berger's interpretation of Basel drumming in North America, starting in the 1960s.

Berger is known to have performed Liberman's Geigy Festival Concerto for Basle Trommel and Orchestra several times, including a performance as late as 1961 at Royal Albert Hall in England for the BBC Festival of Light.

Later in life, Berger wrote additional books on Basel drumming such as Das Basler Trommeln in 1956 for the Swiss audience and Instructor for Basle Drumming, which was published in 1964, just after his death, and circulated widely in American Ancient Drumming circles. He also published several pieces of music, including 3 volumes of Trommelmärsche between 1959 and 1965.

The Berger Lesson 25 is a Hybrid Rudiment named for Fritz Berger. It is primarily due to Berger's (and later Grieder's) influence that the Percussive Arts Society 40 International Rudiments sheet includes the Swiss rudiments the Single Flammed Mill and Swiss Army Triplet. These inclusions appear to be a point of contention for Jack Pratt and the International Association of Traditional Drummers who vocally object to the Swiss influence on American rudiments

== Publications ==
- Das Basler Trommeln nebst vollständigem Lehrgang und einer Sammlung aller Basler Trommelmärsche - 1928
- Das Basler Trommeln, Werden und Wesen - c. 1936
- Das Basler Trommeln - 1956
- Instructor for Basle Drumming - 1964
- Trommelmärsche Vols 1-3 - 1959-1965
