= Drum rudiment =

Rhythm exercise

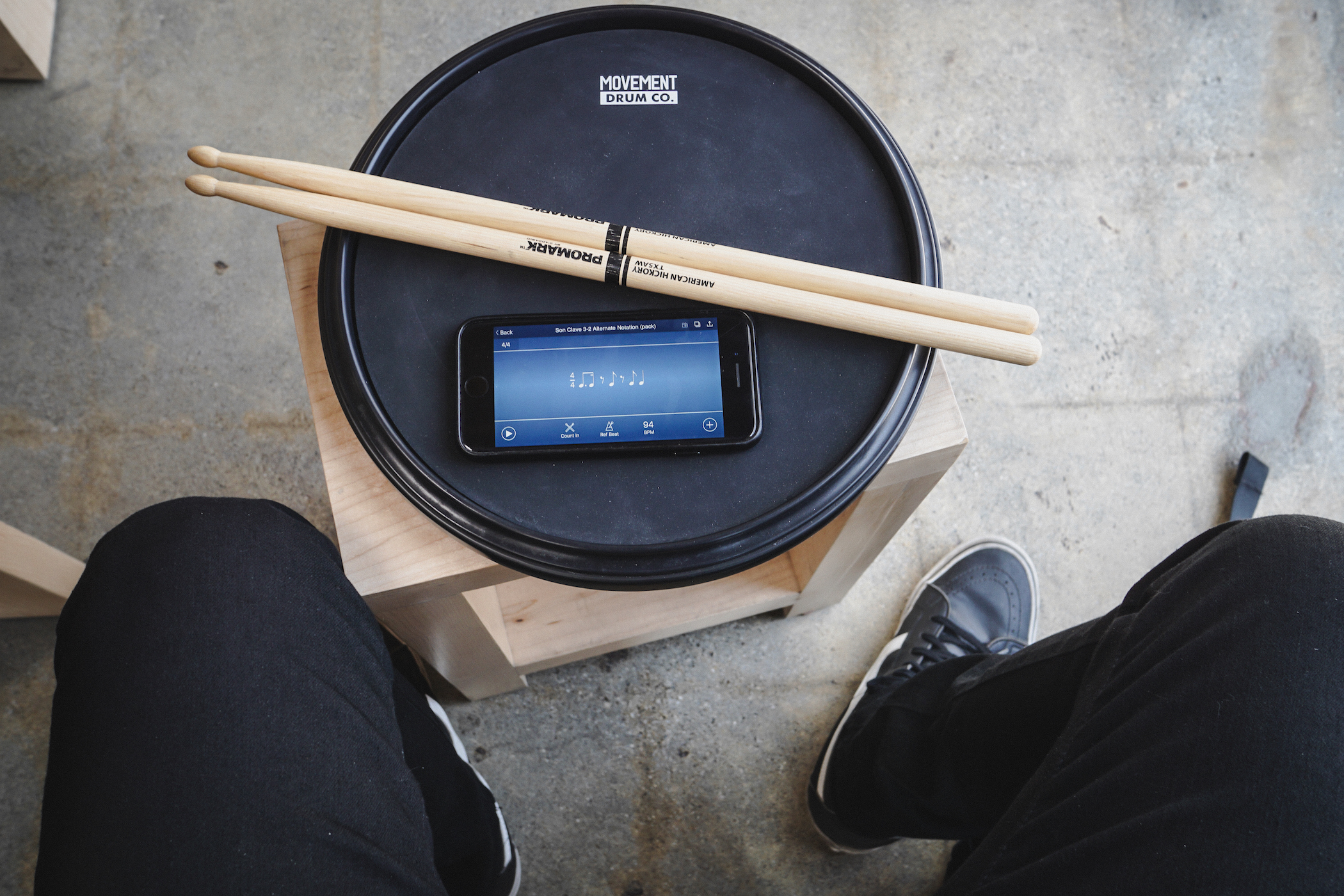
Using a metronome with a practice pad is a common way to practice drum rudiments.

A drum rudiment is one of a number of relatively small patterns in drumming, a form of percussion music. Drum rudiments form the foundation for more extended and complex patterns.

The term "drum rudiment" is most closely associated with various forms of field drumming, where the snare drum plays a prominent role. In this context "rudiment" means not only "basic", but also fundamental. This tradition of drumming originates in military drumming and it is a central component of martial music.

== Definition ==
A drum rudiment is defined by the Encyclopedia Rudimentia as a short pattern of strokes, using John Pratt's logic that "the rudiments of drumming are strokes," in reference to the four basic drum strokes.

Rudimental drumming lacks an agreed formal definition among groups dedicated to drumming or percussion.

Camp Duty Update defines a drum rudiment as an excerpt from a military call with a definite rhythm, definite sticking, definite dynamic structure (accents), and a defined nomenclature.

The Percussive Arts Society defines it as a particular method for learning the drums—beginning with rudiments, and gradually building up speed and complexity through practicing those rudiments.

RudimentalDrumming.com defines it as "the study of coordination".

== History ==
The origin of snare drum rudiments can be traced back to fourteenth century Swiss mercenaries armed with long polearms. The use of pikes in close formation required a great deal of coordination. The sound of the tabor was used to set the tempo and communicate commands with distinct drumming patterns. These drumming patterns became the basis of the snare drum rudiments.

=== Swiss ===
The earliest instance of rudimental fife and drum is often cited as the Swiss military at the battle of Sempach in 1386. There is evidence, however, that the Swiss were already using drums in battle in 1315 at the Battle of Morgarten. Initially, Swiss rudiments were very influential to the French system, which in turn was the basis for many other rudimental systems. Switzerland produced two distinct rudimental cultures, the wider Swiss Ordonnanz Trommel practiced in Zurich, Valais, and Geneva, and the Basel version or Basler Trommeln.

The Basler Trommeln rudiments, in contrast to the Swiss Ordonnanz Trommel, are much more widely known and practiced outside of Switzerland due to Fritz Berger's publications, Das Basler Trommeln, Werden und Wesen and Instructor for Basle Drumming, and travels to the United States in the 1930s. His student Alfons Grieder continued to promote Basel style drumming in North America for many years. The two Swiss systems differ in several ways, including that Basel drumming rudiments draw heavily from the French system while Swiss rudiments are indigenous, and that Basel drumming was notated in a set of symbols until the 20th century (Berger devised his own notation system for export that was much more legible) while Swiss rudiments were written in standard notation centuries earlier. Swiss Ordonnanz rudiments are nearly unknown outside of Switzerland, while Basel rudiments are featured (after the 1930s) in other systems around the world, such as the Scottish, American, and Hybrid. The Top Secret Drum Corps is a prominent organization from Basel, Switzerland that utilizes traditional Basel rudimental drumming along with other rudimental influences.

=== French ===
French rudiments were influenced by the Swiss and then later contributed back to the specific Basel culture in a two-way exchange. Thoinot Arbeau's Orchesographie of 1588 is commonly cited as one of the first "rudimental" texts, though its actual use of notation is limited. French professional drummers became part of the king's honor guard in the 17th and 18th centuries. In 1754 Joseph-Henri de Bombelles published Instruction pour les Tambours, which was one of the earliest military drum manuals to codify a specific national duty in legible drum notation. The craft was improved during the reign of Napoleon I. The French dance known as Le Rigodon is one of the cornerstones of modern rudimental drumming. Kastner's Manuel Général de Musique Militaire a L’Usage des Armées Françaises from 1848 details the rudimental signals starting as far back as the 17th century and works up through the variations to his contemporary mid-19th century usage, showing that the complexity of French drumming increased significantly over time.

At least 5 French military manuals appeared between 1870 and 1900, beginning with Félix Carnaud's École du Tambour from 1870 and N. Pita's Methode de Tambour from 1885, followed closely and expanded upon by H. Broutin (1889), Théophile Dureau (1895), and E. Reveillé (1897).

In the 20th century, Henri Kling published his Méthode de Tambour in 1901. Robert Tourte's Méthode de Tambour et Caisse Claire d'Orchestre was published in 1946 and combined a selection of 34 rudiments and the classic French military calls with studies of common orchestral excerpts such as Nikolai Rimsky-Korsakov's Scheherazade and Maurice Ravel's Bolero. The French system is complex and expansive, rivaled in scope only by the Swiss, American, and Scottish systems. Between 30 and 34 rudiments have normally been taught from the mid-20th century onward, from a historical catalog of over 70 rudiment variations.

=== Spanish ===
Spain used its own rudimental system, documented as far back as 1761, with Manuel de Espinosa publication of Toques de Guerra. Composed mostly of single strokes, the system is extremely simple with only around eight to ten named patterns.

=== Italian ===
The Italian peninsula was home to fife and drum traditions as far back as the 1400s. During the 19th century, at least 3 distinct styles of drumming were practiced: Austrian style drumming in the northern regions adjacent to the Austrian Empire, a central Italian style in Sardinia, Piedmont, and the Papal States, and a southern style in Naples and Sicily. With the unification of the Kingdom of Italy in the 1870s, the central Italian style was adopted over the Austrian or Sicilian as the official pan-Italian rudimental system.

=== German ===
German speaking regions of Europe, often referred to historically as Prussian, had developed their own unique rudimental system by the late 18th century, as evidenced by Wittwe's 1777 publication Kurze Anweisung zum Trommel-Spiel The system was dominated by the right hand and featured only about 14 standard rudiments, such as the druckruf and doppelwirbel. The Prussian drumming style was distinct from the regional rudimental practices of Bavaria, despite Bavaria being a part of modern Germany. It also did not apply in Hannover – which was effectively part of the British Empire for a significant period and thus used British drumming idioms.

=== Swedish ===
Sweden had drummers on military payrolls as early as 1528. The Swedish rudimental style has some unique features and rhythmic interpretations, however it draws significant influence from both French and Prussian sources. The first written manual dates from 1836 with little variation in style until the 20th century. After the 1960s the drum parts in standard military music became simplified compared to their earlier incarnations.

=== Dutch ===
The military tradition of the Netherlands has a distinct rudimental system. Drummers are known to have participated in military functions from possibly as far back as 1570. Military units paid the drummers from their own commanders' budget until 1688 when the military began paying musicians directly. The rudimental term "Tattoo," a term for a meeting of drum corps and a signal from the standard camp duty, derives from the Dutch "Taptoe" Tamboers. Manuals go back at least as far as 1809 with the publication of Over Het Tromslaan – Met Marschen En Andere Muziekstukken Voor Den Trom which indicates some basic rolls and a few military signals. Marsen en Signalen voor de Koninklijke Nederlandsche Armee by Jacob Rauscher was published in 1815 and shows about nine basic rudiments. Several manuals are known from the late 1800s and early 1900s, such as Voorschrift voor den seargent of korporaaltamboer of 1893, Tamboers- and Hoornblazersschool of 1896, and Tamboers- and Hoornblazersschool from 1901. The system was simplified and many embellishments removed in the 1930s. The system was again refined following WWII in 1945 and 1946. Now, only the Dutch Marines continue the official military tradition actively, along with a few civilian groups. There are currently only about 14 Dutch rudiments.

=== Russian ===
Russian drumming was originally brought in from abroad specifically to emulate the drumming of other nations. Dutch drumming was used verbatim in the 17th century. This gave way to a more distinct Russian style in the 18th century under Peter I. Imperial Russian military units stopped using drummers around 1909 but the USSR reintroduced drumming to the military in the 1920s. Russia actually has no names or specific sticking for rudimental patterns but a selection of rolls and ruffs of various lengths are present in military music. Youth Pioneer groups use simplified military signals, though the rudiments taught in these groups use American terms.

=== British ===
British rudimental manuals with decipherable rudiments date back as far as 1634 with the publication of Thomas Fisher's Warlike Directions or the Soldiers Practice which shows at least 4 ruff-based rudiments. A more thorough manual appeared in 1760, Spencer's The Drummer's Instructor. British military drumming had already been exported to the American Colonies by the time of the American Revolution in the 1770s. The anonymously authored Young Drummers Assistant was published around 1780 and was an influential book on both sides of the Atlantic. The British system was further refined for the 19th century by Samuel Potter in 1817 with his book The Art of Beating the Drum. In the 18th century, drummers uniforms were reverse color from the rest of their military unit, but after the War of 1812, and coincidentally during Samuel Potter's service, their uniforms were switched to the standard color scheme so as not to stand out in battle. Samuel's son, Henry Potter, a noted instrument maker, would later publish an updated drum manual called Authorised Sergeant Drummers' Manual. In 1887, the War Office published Drum and Flute Duty for the Infantry Branch of the Army which is one of only a few pre-20th century publications to feature the 17 stroke roll. In modern times, every infantry battalion in the British military has a rudimental Corps of Drums except for Irish, Scottish, and Rifle Battalions which feature Pipe Bands and their associated style of Scottish drumming.

=== Scottish ===
Scottish drum and fife signals (those differing significantly from the English) date back to at least the 17th century, when the English referred to them as the "Scots Duty." The old Scottish calls used similar rudimental patterns and drumming idioms to the English, but featured slightly different drum arrangements and fife tunes, rather than the distinctively snappy dot-cut triplet shuffle sound that pipe band drumming would use later. The Scotch Reveille that would normally accompany The Mother and the Three Camps was adapted from, or at least inspired by, the Scotch Reveilly [sic] from this pre-pipe band era. Scottish pipe bands, in their modern form, were created by the British Army around 1830. British regiments made up of Scottish clansmen married rudimental drumming with the Highland bagpipes and kilts in order to regain their independent culture. The drum rudiments were modified from British and European sources to fit with the piping idioms that had been in place for several hundred years prior. Pipe bands, and their stylistically unique drummers, saw their first widespread use during the Crimean War. They continued to be an active part of battle until World War I, after which they assumed a ceremonial role. There are currently around 60–75 Scottish rudiments played in pipe bands around the commonwealth countries and former British colonies, taking influence from Swiss, French, and American Hybrid drumming as well as traditional Scottish rhythms.

=== American ===
Many attempts at formalizing a standard list of American snare drum rudiments have been made. The first publication to formally organize American drumming was by Friedrich Wilhelm von Steuben during the American Revolutionary War while he was at Valley Forge. He included camp duty signals in his general manual on military practices for George Washington’s troops, the “blue book” written in 1778–79, though the drum parts were listed in prose. The first America rudimental manual to have prescribed rudimental exercises in notation was A Revolutionary War Drummers Book, also from 1778, which displayed 20 exercises that can be taken as rudiments as well as "drum beatings" such as the piece Valley Forg [sic]. This was followed by Ben Clark's manual on military drumming in 1797 and David Hazeltine's book Instructor in Martial Music in 1810. Charles Stewart Ashworth was the first person to actually label short drum exercises as "Rudiments" in 1812.

Several more manuals of note were printed between 1812 and 1860, including those by Charles Robbins (1812), Rumrille and Holton (1817), Alvan Robinson (1818), Levi Lovering (1819), and George Klinehanse (1853).

A number of manuals next appeared during the American Civil War, including those by Elias Howe (1861), Keach, Burditt, and Cassidy (1861), Bruce and Emmett (1862), H.C. Hart (1862), Simpson and Canterbury (1862), William Nevins (1864). Adjutant-General Samuel Cooper's general military manual of 1861 also contained a small section on rudimental drumming, but in a very simplified form, as did Brigadier General Silas Casey’s tactics manual of 1862.

Gardiner A. Strube published his influential distillation of Civil War practices in 1870. Between the Civil War and the 20th century, Fifes and Drums were phased out in favor of bugles for official signals, though military music continued to be taught and practiced for ceremonial purposes. John Philip Sousa produced a manual in 1886 that would later be revised several times by the U.S. Army. Walter Smith also produced a manual in 1897 for the Army and Navy, though he was a bandleader in the Marines. In 1912, just 42 years after Strube's Lessons, Harry Bower, in his book The Harry A. Bower System for Drums Bells Xylophone and Tympani, calls the military rudiments "ancient," "old fashioned," and "old style beats, rolls, and flourishes," to be played only when emulating a military sound. The Bower book offers several competing versions of many rudiments taken from multiple competing 19th century manuals.

During World War I, V.F. Safranek published a manual in 1916 (based on Smith's 1897 work), while Carl E. Gardner released another in 1918. Sanford Moeller put a list in his 1925 book, which is one of the few books here intended for civilian drummers. The Moeller method advocated for a return to the "ancient" traditions of military drumming technique and rudiments.

The National Association of Rudimental Drummers (NARD), an organization established to promote rudimental drumming that included George Lawrence Stone and William F. Ludwig, Sr., organized a list of 13 essential rudiments and second set of 13 additional rudiments to form the Standard NARD 26 in 1933. This was largely based on Strube's 25 rudiments from 1870, with a single addition, the single stroke roll.

During World War II, the War Department used a manual from 1940, TM 20–250 Field Music Technical Manual, that clearly echoes Smith and Safranek. The Marine Corps had a competing manual, essentially mirroring Sousa but updated in 1942, Manual for Drummers, Trumpeters, and Fifers.

Later in the 20th century there were several notable variations and extensions of rudimental drumming from teachers like Charles Wilcoxon, author of All-American Drummer and Modern Rudimental Swing Solos, and Alan Dawson, whose "Rudimental Ritual" was popular at Berklee College of Music in the 1970s.

Drum Corps International was founded in 1971 bringing together drum corps from around North America to compete, some of which had been in existence since the 1930s or 1940s (though many others were formed as late as the mid-1960s). From the outset, the drummers steadily expanded the rudimental vocabulary from the traditional American military and NARD repertoire to include Swiss rudiments as well as Hybrid rudiments that combined elements of multiple unrelated rudiments into new, more complex patterns.

In 1984, a Percussive Arts Society committee led by Jay Wanamaker reorganized, and reinterpreted, the NARD 26 and added another 14 to form the current 40 International Snare Drum Rudiments.

Beginning in the early 1990s, rudimental instruction began to focus heavily on hybrid rudiments. Edward Freytag's 1993 Rudimental Cookbook and Dennis Delucia's 1995 Percussion Discussion both feature significant hybrid rudiment instruction. This trend continued into the 21st century with John Wooton's 2010 Rudimental Remedies, Bill Bachman's 2010 Rudimental Logic, and Ryan Bloom's 2019 Encyclopedia Rudimentia significantly focusing on hybrid corps-style rudiments as well as older standards.

=== Present day ===
In the 21st century there are four principal rudimental drumming cultures: Swiss Basler Trommeln, Scottish pipe drumming, Anglo-American ancient drumming, and American modern drumming (or DCI hybrid drumming). Other organized rudimental systems include the French, Dutch, German (Prussian), Swedish, Trommeslått, Bavarian, Austro-Hungarian, Italian, Belgian, Mexican, Russian, Swiss Ordonnanz Trommel (non-Basel, poorly understood outside of Switzerland), and Bajoaragonés systems, which are still studied and performed on a small scale in their home countries. There is also a distinct historic Spanish military rudimental culture, though this system is no longer widely used, as well as a similarly defunct Sicilian system.

Recently, the International Association of Traditional Drummers (IATD) has been working to once again promote the 26 NARD rudiments of 1933 (1870 Strube list of 25 plus 1). One of the chief issues the IATD has with the PAS 40 is the "Swiss influence," though only eight of the extra 14 rudiments (that do not appear in the Standard 26) are foreign or not found in American military manuals prior to Strube. Only two of those eight non-traditional rudiments can be traced to a Swiss origin.

There is a movement in the German-speaking areas of Europe, led by Claus Hessler and Percussion Creativ, to revise rudimental practices and combine the French and Basel systems with some of the modern American rudiments into a single Rudimental Codex of 42 rudiments. The Rudimental Codex has been submitted to UNESCO as an intangible World Heritage Site.

== Terminology ==
=== Single stroke ===
A stroke performs a single percussive note. There are four basic single strokes.

=== Double stroke ===
A double stroke consists of two single strokes played by the same hand (either RR or LL).

=== Diddle ===
A diddle is a double stroke played at the current prevailing speed of the piece. For example, if a sixteenth-note passage is being played, then any diddles in that passage would consist of sixteenth notes.

=== Paradiddle ===
A paradiddle consists of two single strokes followed by a double stroke, i.e., RLRR or LRLL. When multiple paradiddles are played in succession, the first note always alternates between right and left. Therefore, a single paradiddle is often used to switch the "lead hand" in drumming music.

=== Mill stroke ===
A mill stroke is essentially a reversed paradiddle with the sticking RRLR or LLRL with an accent on the first note. The single flammed mill is the most common mill stroke variant in American playing.

=== Drag ===
A drag is a double stroke played at twice the speed of the context in which it is placed. For example, if a sixteenth-note passage is being played then any drags in that passage would consist of thirty-second notes. Drags can also be notated as grace notes, in which case the spacing between the notes can be interpreted by the player. On timpani, drags are often played with alternating sticking (lrL or rlR).

In Scottish pipe band snare drumming, a drag consists of a flam where the grace note is played as a "deadstick" (staccato note).

=== Ruff ===
Historically, 2 grace notes preceding a beat were known as a Ruff (or Rough) llR if played closed and a Half Drag llR when played open. Ruff can also refer to a single stroked set of grace notes preceding a regular note. In American playing the 3 Stroke Ruff has 2 single stroked grace notes before the primary or full note rlR and a 4 Stroke Ruff has 3 singles before the primary note lrlR. Other rudimental systems have differing sticking methods and names for similar notation figures. Though still used and taught by drummers and drum teachers in practice, the 3 Stroke Ruff and 4 Stroke Ruff are not officially listed on the NARD or PAS rudiment sheets and the term Drag has eclipsed Ruff (or Rough) for the double stroked rudiments, in both open or closed execution, according to the current PAS standard terminology.

=== Flam ===
A flam consists of two single strokes played by alternating hands (rL or lR). The first stroke is a quieter grace note followed by a louder primary stroke on the opposite hand. The two notes are played almost simultaneously, and are intended to sound like a single, broader note. The temporal distance between the grace note and the primary note can vary depending on the style and context of the piece being played. In the past, or in some European systems, open flams and closed flams were listed as separate rudiments.

=== Charge stroke ===
A charge stroke is a special variation on an open flam in which one or both of the notes are accented to provide a driving feel that can create the illusion that the downbeat has moved earlier in time. The two major types are French Lr or Rl and Swiss LR or RL with the first note preceding the downbeat, which falls on the second note, in both types. Charge strokes can be combined with flams or drags to create complex grace note figures preceding a downbeat.

=== Double stop ===
A double stop consists of two single strokes played simultaneously, one on each hand. It differs from a flam or charge stroke in that there is no space between the notes and both hands fall exactly at the same time. This is not considered an American rudiment on any common list, but is a staple of several European systems. Alternative names include Flat Flam, Unison, or Both and the technique is used in modern corps style snare drumming as well as drum kit and classical percussion applications.

=== Roll ===
Drum rolls are various techniques employed to produce a sustained, continuous sound.

== Percussive Arts Society rudiments ==
Rudiments according to the Percussive Arts Society. There are more than 850 rudiments worldwide, but these 40 are the current American standards, referred to as “international” because they mix rudiments traditionally used in Anglo-American drumming with several drawn from the Swiss Basel drumming tradition. They were compiled by a committee led by Jay Wanamaker in 1984 that also happened to include William F. Ludwig Jr., son of the founder of NARD in 1933. In contrast, there are 26 rudiments between the NARD 13 Essential and 13 Rudiments to Complete sheets, 46 rudiments on the Scottish Drumming Rudiments sheet, and 42 rudiments on the French/Swiss Rudimental Codex sheet.

=== Roll rudiments ===
==== Single stroke rudiments ====
The single-stroke roll consists of alternating sticking (i.e., RLRL, etc.) of indeterminate speed and length.

Name	Notation	Example	Description
Single stroke roll			Evenly-spaced notes played with alternating sticking. Though usually played fast, even half notes with alternating sticking would be considered a single stroke roll.
Single stroke four		Example of the drum rudiment single stroke four	Four notes played with alternating sticking, usually as a triplet followed by an eighth note (as in the picture) or as three grace notes before a downbeat (like a ruff)
Single stroke seven			Seven notes played with alternating sticking, usually as sextuplet followed by a quarter note

==== Multiple bounce roll rudiments ====
Name	Notation	Example	Description
Multiple bounce roll			Alternate-handed strokes with no specific number of bounces. Sounds even and continuous. Also called a "buzz roll," "closed roll," or "press roll" (most often when referred to in the context of drum-set playing).
Triple stroke roll		Example of the drum rudiment triple stroke roll	Alternate-handed strokes with three specific strokes. Each stroke can be bounced or wristed. Also called a "French roll".

==== Double stroke open roll rudiments ====
There are 10 official variants of the double-stroke roll.

Name	Notation	Example	Description
Double stroke (open roll or long roll)			Like the single-stroke roll, usually played fast, but even when played slowly, alternating diddles are considered a double stroke roll. Played so each individual note can be heard distinctly.
Five stroke roll			Two diddles followed by an accented note
Six stroke roll		Example of the drum rudiment six stroke roll	Unlike most other double stroke rudiments, the six stroke roll begins with an accented single note. It is followed by two diddles and another accented note.
Seven stroke roll			Three diddles followed by an accented note
Nine stroke roll			Four diddles followed by an accented note
Ten stroke roll			Four diddles followed by two accented notes
Eleven stroke roll			Five diddles followed by an accented note
Thirteen stroke roll			Six diddles followed by an accented note
Fifteen stroke roll			Seven diddles followed by an accented note
Seventeen stroke roll			Eight diddles followed by an accented note

=== Diddle rudiments ===
Name	Notation	Example	Description
Single paradiddle		Example of the drum rudiment single paradiddle	Two alternating notes followed by a diddle
Double paradiddle			Four alternating notes followed by a diddle
Triple paradiddle			Six alternating notes followed by a diddle
Paradiddle-diddle			Two alternating taps followed by two alternating diddles

=== Flam rudiments ===
Four flams (drums)
Four flams drum cadence by the United States Navy Band

Name	Notation	Example	Description
Flam			Two taps (a grace note followed by a full volume tap) played very close together in order to sound like one slightly longer note. In the Hudson Music DVD Great Hands For a Lifetime, drummer Tommy Igoe describes flams as "the easiest rudiment to play wrong" and goes on to say "...think of the syllable 'lam'. It's one syllable. 'Flam' is still only one syllable, but it's slightly longer." This is a good way for a beginner to conceptualize a "correct" flam.
Flam accent			Alternating groups of three notes of the form [flam – tap – tap]
Flam tap			Alternating diddles with flams on the first note of each diddle
Flamacue			A group of four notes and an ending downbeat, where the first note and the down beat are flammed, and the second note is accented
Flam Paradiddle			A paradiddle with a flam on the first note. Also known as a "flamadiddle".
Single flammed mill			An inverted paradiddle (RRLR, LLRL) with a flam on the first note of each diddle
Flam paradiddle-diddle			Alternating paradiddle-diddles with flams on the first note of each
Pataflafla		Example of the drum rudiment pataflafla	A four-note pattern with flams on the first and last notes
Swiss Army triplet			A right hand flam followed by a right tap and a left tap, or (using a left hand lead) a left hand flam followed by a left tap and a right tap. It is often used in the place of a flam accent, since repeated flam accents will have three taps on the same hand in a row, where repeated Swiss army triplets only involve two taps on the same hand.
Inverted flam tap			Alternating diddles (offset by one sixteenth note) with a flam on the second note of each diddle. Also known as a "tap flam".
Flam drag		Example of the drum rudiment flam drag	Alternating groups of three notes of the form [flam – drag – tap]

=== Drag rudiments ===
Name	Notation	Description
Drag (half drag or ruff)		Two diddled grace notes before a tap, which is usually accented
Single drag tap (single drag)		Two alternating notes where the first note has drag grace notes and the second is accented
Double drag tap (double drag)		A single drag tap with another grace note drag before it
Lesson 25 (two and three)		A lesson 25 is three alternating notes where the first note has drag grace notes and the third is accented
Single dragadiddle		A paradiddle where the first note is a drag
Drag paradiddle No. 1		The first drag paradiddle is an accented note followed by a paradiddle with drag grace notes on the first note.
Drag paradiddle No. 2		The second drag paradiddle is two accented notes followed by a paradiddle, with drag grace notes on the second accented note and the first note of the paradiddle.
Single ratamacue		Four notes where the first note has drag grace notes and the fourth is accented
Double ratamacue		A single ratamacue with a drag before it
Triple ratamacue		A single ratamacue with two drags before it

== Historical organization ==
Strube's Drum and Fife Instructor lists the snare drum rudiments needed to play the camp duty. These then became the NARD standard rudiments.

=== Strube (1870) ===
1. The Long Roll (i.e. double stroke open roll)^{[Note1]}
2. The Five-Stroke Roll
3. The Seven-Stroke Roll
4. The Nine-Stroke Roll
5. The Ten-Stroke Roll
6. The Eleven-Stroke Roll
7. The Thirteen-Stroke Roll
8. The Fifteen-Stroke Roll
9. The Flam
10. The Ruff (i.e. drag)
11. The Single Drag (i.e. single drag tap)
12. The Double Drag (i.e. double drag tap)
13. The Single Ratamacue
14. The Double Ratamacue
15. The Triple Ratamacue
16. The Flam Accent
17. The Flamacue
18. The Flam Tap
19. The Single Paradiddle
20. The Double Paradiddle
21. The Flam Paradiddle
22. The Flam Paradiddle-Diddle
23. The Drag Paradiddle, No. 1
24. The Drag Paradiddle, No. 2
25. (No name given)^{[Note2]}

The Single-Stroke Roll is given in a footnote
As each rudiment is introduced with "Lesson, No. X", this became known as the Lesson 25

=== 26 NARD Standard Rudiments (1933) ===
==== Thirteen "essential" rudiments ====
- The double stroke open roll
- The five stroke roll
- The seven stroke roll
- The flam
- The flam accent
- The flam paradiddle
- The flamacue
- The drag (half drag or ruff)
- The single drag tap
- The double drag tap
- The double paradiddle
- The single ratamacue
- The triple ratamacue

==== Second thirteen rudiments ====
- The single stroke roll
- The nine stroke roll
- The ten stroke roll
- The eleven stroke roll
- The thirteen stroke roll
- The fifteen stroke roll
- The flam tap
- The single paradiddle
- The drag paradiddle No. 1
- The drag paradiddle No. 2
- The flam paradiddle-diddle
- The lesson 25
- The double ratamacue

=== The last fourteen rudiments (1984) ===
In 1984, the Percussive Arts Society added 14 more rudiments to extend the list to the current 40 International Snare Drum Rudiments. The ordering was completely changed during this last re-organization, in some places restoring the Strube order.

- The single stroke four
- The single stroke seven
- The multiple bounce roll
- The triple stroke roll
- The six stroke roll
- The seventeen stroke roll
- The triple paradiddle
- The single paradiddle-diddle
- The single flammed mill
- The pataflafla
- The Swiss Army triplet
- The inverted flam tap
- The flam drag
- The single dragadiddle

== Notable contributors ==
- Charles Stewart Ashworth: drum major and author, United States Marine Corps Band
- Samuel Potter: drum major and author, Band of the Coldstream Guards
- H.C. Hart: drum major and author, 71st New York Infantry
- George Barrett Bruce: drum major and author, 7th New York Militia, 22nd New York Infantry Regiment, 5th Maryland Infantry Regiment, 69th New York Infantry Regiment.
- Gardiner A. Strube: drum major and author, Duryeé's Zouaves, 12th Regiment NGSNY.
- J. Burns Moore: champion drummer, contributor to the 26 rudiments, former president of NARD, New Haven Symphony Orchestra and Governor's Guards
- William F. Ludwig: contributor to the selection of the standard 26 rudiments, owner of Ludwig Drums Company, former president of NARD
- George Lawrence Stone: author and teacher, contributor to the selection of the standard 26 rudiments, former president of NARD
- Charley Wilcoxon: author and teacher
- Fritz Berger: author and teacher, promoter of Swiss rudiments
- Frank Arsenault: teacher known for his official recording of The 26 Standard American Drum Rudiments and Selected Solos, former president of NARD
- John S. Pratt: author, instructor, and arranger, West Point Band, Interstatesmen, Gray Knights, and Hawthorne Caballeros Drum and Bugle Corps, and founder of IATD
- Marty Hurley: contributor to the PAS 40 rudiments, instructor and arranger, Phantom Regiment Drum and Bugle Corps
- Mitch Markovich: composer, clinician, former president of NARD, The Cavaliers Drum and Bugle Corps
- Fred Sanford: contributor to the PAS 40 rudiments, instructor and arranger, Santa Clara Vanguard Drum and Bugle Corps
- Jay Wanamaker: author, contributor to the PAS 40 rudiments, president Roland Corporation
- Ralph Hardimon: instructor and arranger, Santa Clara Vanguard Drum and Bugle Corps
- Claus Heßler: president of Percussion Creativ, contributor to the Rudimental Codex

== Hybrid rudiments ==
A hybrid drum rudiment is when two rudiments are combined into one rudiment. For example, the PAS #30 Flam Drag is a simple hybrid combining the traditional PAS rudiments #20 Flam and #31 Drag. A hybrid can also be created by adding a prefix before a rudiment or a suffix at the end of the rudiment in the form of extra notes or a rudimental pattern.

There are certain characteristics that make a reasonable hybrid rudiment:

- The Rudiment cannot be too long as to where it extends beyond one measure (bar).
- The Rudiment needs to be symmetrical meaning that it may be played on the right or left. As an example; the rock beat cannot be a rudiment because the right-hand plays something completely different from the left.

A few examples are the "Herta" which is a drag played with alternating sticking; the "cheese", a diddle with a grace note; and the "eggbeater", a five-tuplet with the sticking "rrrll." These hybrids have themselves given way to further hybrids; the "cheese invert" (an inverted flam tap with cheeses instead of flams) and the "diddle-egg-five" (a paradiddle-diddle followed by an eggbeater and two diddles, one on each hand). Other hybrid rudiments include: "book reports", "ninjas", and "flam dragons" (formerly known as "double flam drags").

Hybrid rudiments have been historically associated with modern marching band repertoire, especially Drum Corps International. The number of hybrid rudiments expanded rapidly starting in the 1990s. Today there are an indeterminate number, with more than 500 published and documented hybrid rudiments or unique variations.

The latest innovation in hybrid rudiments has been "The Grid", which is a method for producing variations on a simple rudimental pattern by moving the individual elements of the rudiment (for example flams, accents, or diddles) through the notes of basic rhythm of the rudiment. One example of a Grid technique would be to play the PAS Flam Accent (a grace note and accent on the first of 3 single strokes) with the accent on the first note, then the second note, then the third note, producing 3 variations of the pattern and exhausting the placement options for the accent within the rhythm. The same could then be done with the grace note for the flam, producing 3 more patterns. The resulting 6 patterns could then be combined in a sequential way, producing further variations until all combinations of elements are exhausted. Not all of the resulting combinations are named or officially listed as rudiments, but are useful in developing a player's skills.

== See also ==
- Drum cadence
