= John Wooton =

American drummer

Dr. John Wooton DMA
- Born: Eugene, Oregon
- Occupation: Director of Percussion Studies - University of Southern Mississippi
- Known for: Rudimental drumming, steel pans and total percussion
- Board member of: P.A.S. Marching Percussion Committee, Education Committee
- Children: Andrew and Olivia

Academic background
- Education: DMA, MM, BM
- Alma mater: University of Iowa, University of North Texas, University of Louisiana at Lafayette

Academic work
- Discipline: Percussion
- Sub-discipline: Rudimental and Marching Percussion, Steel Drum
- Institutions: University of Southern Mississippi, University of Iowa, Phantom Regiment Drum and Bugle Corps
- Website: http://www.johnwooton.com

John Wooton is an American percussionist, drummer, and professor of percussion. He is the director of percussion studies at the University of Southern Mississippi and has written two books on rudimental drumming.

== Career ==
John Wooton marched in the snare line of the Phantom Regiment from 1981 to 1984. During his time in the corps he won the Drum Corps Midwest Individual Snare Drum title and the Percussive Arts Society Snare Drum Individual title in 1983. He attended the University of Louisiana Lafayette and earned a Bachelor of Music in 1985. Wooton returned to the Phantom Regiment to be the percussion caption head from 1987 to 1989. He received his Masters of Music from the University of North Texas in 1988 and his Doctor of Musical Arts in 1994 from University of Iowa. From 1988 to 1992, Wooton served as percussion coordinator/pep band director for the University of Iowa.

Wooton has served as the president of the Mississippi chapter of the Percussive Arts Society and was a member of the Marching Percussion Committee from 1990 to 2012.

He has been a professor of music at the University of Southern Mississippi since 1992, where he teaches Applied Percussion, Percussion Ensemble, Steel Pan Orchestra, Percussion Methods, Percussion Arranging and Composing, Percussion Pedagogy, Graduate Percussion Ensemble, and Samba Band. He currently serves as the Director of Percussion Studies.

In 1992 he published his book, The Drummer's Rudimental Reference Book. He followed with a book and DVD combo in 2010 called Dr. Throwdown's Rudimental Remedies. He has published around 10 other musical works for percussion with Row Loff Productions over his career.

Wooton leads a steel band called Kaiso and frequently plays with the Southern Miss Jazz Quintet. He has been associated with five National Champion drum lines, including the University of Louisiana at Lafayette and the University of North Texas.

He is a former endorser of Sabian cymbals and current endorser of Zildjian cymbals, Pearl drums, Remo drum heads, and Vic Firth sticks; he is also a member of the Vic Firth Education Team.
