= Carl E. Gardner =

American musician

- Born: April 13, 1885 East Bridgewater, Massachusetts, U.S.
- Died: Unknown
- Occupation: Author, Percussionist, Drum Maker
- Genre: Percussion Instruction, Music Theory

Carl E. Gardner was an American percussionist, drum maker, and method book author.

== Career ==
Carlton Edward Gardner was born in 1885 in Massachusetts. He published a book called Music Composition sometime before his book on music theory, Essentials of Music Theory, in 1912. Gardner was the timpanist for the Boston Symphony Orchestra from 1915-1920. During this time he also published a rudimental drumming manual called The Military Drummer (1918), which was "indorsed [sic] by the U.S. Army and Navy authorities," Music Composition: A New Method of Harmony (1918), and The Gardner Modern Method for the Instruments of Percussion (1919). In 1919, Gardner partnered with BSO trombonist Fortunato Sordillo to form the Sordillo-Gardner Music Company, which manufactured Gardner-designed Free Tension Drums. After leaving the Symphony in 1920, Gardner helped form the Boston Society of Musical Instrument Manufacturers in 1922. In 1925, he contributed to Carl Fischer's Drum Fife and Bugle Corps Leaflets along with Francis Findlay and W.A. Maynard. 3 of the 8 lessons in the leaflets were on the snare drum and each leaflet cost 10 cents. Gardner wrote several volumes of Progressive Studies for the Snare Drum, the first of which was published in 1928. Gardner was the program director for the Music Supervisor's National Band Conference Band Festival on Boston Common at least 4 times, the 4th being in 1928. He went on to serve as the Supervisor of Bands and Orchestras for Boston Public Schools in the 1920s, 1930s and 1940s, where he taught de:Joe Cocuzzo. Gardner published a timpani method in 1944, a percussion method in 1945 called Drums, Cymbals, Accessories, and a book called Reading Lessons for the First Year Drummer in 1950. His book Modern Method for Bells, Xylophone, Marimba, and Chimes is a recommended volume for teachers of percussion.

== Publications ==
All of Gardner's publications were released with Carl Fischer Music

- Music Composition
- Essentials of Music Theory
- The Military Drummer
- Music Composition: A New Method of Harmony
- The Gardner Modern Method for the Instruments of Percussion
- Carl Fischer's Drum Fife and Bugle Corps Leaflets
- Progressive Studies for the Snare Drum Book 1 - Elementary
- Progressive Studies for the Snare Drum Book 2 - Intermediate
- Progressive Studies for the Snare Drum Book III - Advanced
- Progressive Studies for the Snare Drum Book IV - Post-Graduate
- The Gardner Method for the Timpani
- Drums, Cymbals, Accessories
- Reading Lessons for the First Year Drummer
- Modern Method for Bells, Xylophone, Marimba, and Chimes
