= Charles Stewart Ashworth =

American drummer

- Born: c. 1777; England
- Occupations: U.S. marine, drummer, drum major, author
- Writing career
- Period: 1802–1816

Charles Stewart Ashworth was drum major of the United States Marine Band in the early 1800s and the author of an influential rudimental drum manual.

== Bio ==
Charles Stewart Ashworth was born in England but had emigrated to the United States by December 13, 1802, when he enlisted in the U.S. Marine Corps in Boston. He had been a Marine for just 2 years when, based on his previous drumming experience in England, he was promoted to drum major at the Washington Barracks.

January 14, 1812 Ashworth published his book A New, Useful and Complete System of Drum Beating. Though not the first American drum manual detailing short rudimental exercises, it was the first to use the term Rudiments in a drumming context, calling them "Rudiments for Beating in General." This book standardized the teaching of military drumming in the Army, Navy, and Marine Corps. It also preserved the camp duty practices, or standard drum signals for military units, from the time of the American Revolutionary War by reiterating the calls and signals utilized by Friedrich Wilhelm von Steuben at Valley Forge. The book would be utilized through the War of 1812. It was also used as the basis for many other later drum manuals, including those by George Klinehanse, William Nevins, George Barrett Bruce and Dan Emmett, and Ryan. The rudimental system used was very similar to that of the British Army, owing to Ashworth's birth in England and the relative youth of the United States as an independent country. Many similarities can be seen with Samuel Potter's 1815 book Art of Beating the Drum, a standard of British drumming published in London, though there are also some marked differences. Elias Howe later called Ashworth's rudiments "the old English style used in 1812."

Ashworth left his post on October 16, 1816, prompting this quote from Commandant Lieutenant Colonel Franklin Wharton: “The late Drum Major, Ashworth, having declined longer service in the Corps, I shall have to obtain some other person. I wish you therefore to Advertise for one and after receiving all the recommendations of the Applicants report them—but make no agreement with anyone—I must, having required enquiry to be made at other places, reserve to myself the right of selecting. The pay is $12 per month and $2 per [Music ] Boy taught.”

== Publications ==
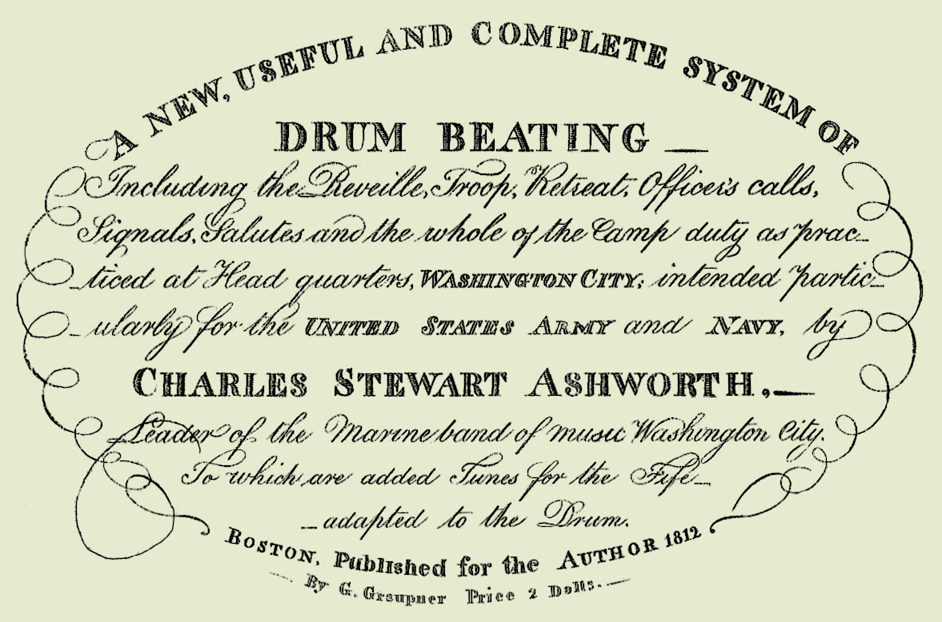
Cover of the "Drum Beating" book by Charles Stewart Ashworth, 1812

A New, Useful and Complete System of Drum Beating Including The Reveille, The Troop, Retreat, Officers Calls, Signals, Salutes and the whole of the Camp Duty as practiced at Head Quarters, Washington City, intended particularly for the United States Army and Navy by Charles Stewart Ashworth Director of the Marine Band of music, Washington City. To which are added tunes for the fife – adapted to the drum – 1812,
