= Fritz Berger =

Fritz Berger may refer to:

- Fritz Berger (painter) (1916–2002), German painter
- Fritz Berger (officer) (1900–1973), German naval officer
- Fritz Berger (skier), Swiss para-alpine skier
- Fritz Berger (percussionist) (1895–1963), Swiss drummer
