= Samuel Potter =

Samuel Potter may refer to:

- Samuel Potter (drum major) (1772–1838), British drum major
- Samuel J. Potter (1753–1804), United States senator from Rhode Island
