= Drum cadence =

Work played exclusively by a modern marching percussion section

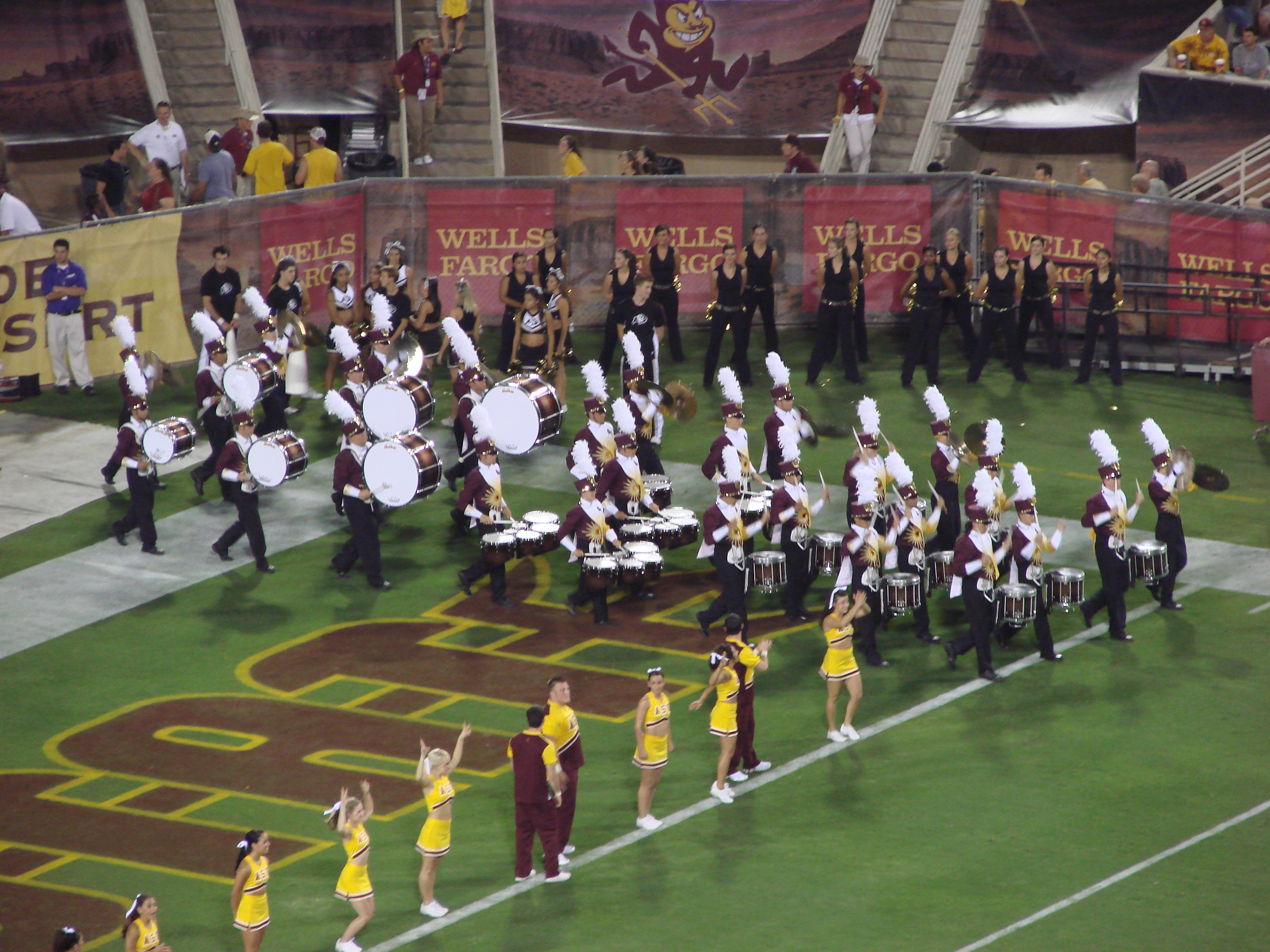
The Sun Devil Marching Band marching to their pregame cadence

Drum - Cadence A

Drum - Cadence B

Drum - Four Flams
Snare drum cadences performed by the United States Navy Band

In music, a drum cadence or street beat is a work played exclusively by the percussion section of a modern marching band or drum and bugle corps (see marching percussion). It is stylistically descended from early military marches, and related to military cadences, as both are a means of providing a beat while marching.

According to Hiro Songsblog a drum cadence is "'a drumline piece played in a parading marching band between or in place of full-band pieces'. Cadences are also: 'a chant that is sung by military personnel while parading or marching'."

Cadences employ the four basic drum strokes and often directly include drum rudiments. They have a wide range of difficulty, from simple accent patterns to complex rhythms including hybrid rudiments, and are played by virtually every modern drum line. Cadences are important from a performance standpoint, as a good drum cadence can make the band stand out from the rest in competition. Field shows are often preceded by the band marching to the beat of the cadence.

Marching percussion generally consists of at least snare drums, tenor drums, cymbals, and bass drums, and may include timpani.

== See also ==
- Cadence (music)
- Military drum
- wikt:drum cadence
