= Ralph Hardimon =

American drummer

- Born: March 22, 1952 Oklahoma City, Oklahoma, United States
- Genres: drum and bugle corps, marching band, rhythm and blues, and jazz
- Occupation: musician
- Instrument: percussion

Ralph Hardimon is a percussionist, teacher, composer, and clinician. He is best known for his work in the areas of marching percussion, rudimental drumming, drum & bugle corps, and marching band.

== Career ==
Hardimon's performance experience started in the late sixties with the Los Angeles Police Band, and later the Velvet Knights and Anaheim Kingsmen drum & bugle corps. He taught and studied with Fred Sanford and studied with Charles Dowd at the University of Oregon.

Following Fred Sanford's departure after the 1980 season, Hardimon became Director of Percussion for the Santa Clara Vanguard from 1981 through 1990. During this time, SCV won four High Percussion awards (1978, 1979, 1988, 1989) and three DCI World Championships. Hardimon served as a consultant for SCV from 1997 to 2000. He has scored music for many other corps (including Blue Knights from 1990 to 2001) as well as college percussion ensembles and marching bands. He has worked for Disney and bowl games such as the Citrus Bowl, Orange Bowl, and Super Bowl.

Hardimon received Grammy nominations for Jazz and Rhythm and Blues. He was inducted into the DCI hall of fame in 2000, inducted into the Santa Clara Vanguard Hall of Fame in 2014, and received the “Life Time Achievement Award” from Sabian Cymbals in 2005.

== Fraternity ==
Ralph Hardimon is also a member of Mu Phi Sigma national percussion fraternity, and an Honorary Member of Snare Si Phi percussion organization.

== Endorsements ==
The popular drum stick company Vic Firth manufactures multiple signature Ralph Hardimon drumsticks. These sticks include the standard SRH and SRHN models, the Ralphie Jr., Ralph Hardimon Indoor, Ralph Hardimon "Hammer," Ralph Hardimon "Chop-Out," Ralph Hardimon Tenor Stick, and Ralph Hardimon Tenor Swizzle.
