= Charles Wilcoxon =

American drummer

- Born: November 26, 1894 Coshocton, OH, U.S.
- Died: 1978, age 84
- Occupation: Author, Drummer, Teacher, Entrepreneur
- Period: 1916–1978
- Genre: Drum and Percussion Instruction
- Notable awards: PAS Hall Of Fame

Charles "Charley" Wilcoxon was an American drum teacher and drum method book writer. He wrote several influential books on rudimental drumming that are still used by drum teachers today. He is a member of the Percussive Arts Society Hall of Fame.

== Bio ==
Charles Wilcoxon was born November 26, 1894, in Coshocton, Ohio, or possibly Newark, Ohio. He received his first drum in 1899 at the age of 5 and was taught basic music reading by his mother, a piano teacher. He began performing at the age of 8 in movie theaters around Coshocton. He started teaching at 12 and was touring at 14 with the vaudeville show "Spring Maid". Charles was a member of the touring orchestra for the D.W. Griffith movie “Intolerance.” From 1922 to 1933 he played at The Palace in Cleveland, as the house drummer. He then founded his own music store in the 1930s, where he lathed custom drum sticks. His books were originally written by hand as an aid for teaching private students at Wilcoxon's Drum Shop and Studio at the Arcade in Cleveland, and many of the solos were dedicated to specific students. Wilcoxon reportedly wrote all 150 solos for All-American Drummer in just six weeks. In addition to his several snare drum and drum kit publications, he wrote mallet etudes and solos for vibraphone and marimba, though these were never published. He played, including with the Cleveland Symphony Orchestra, taught, and authored instructional books until his death in Cleveland in 1978. He is quoted as often saying, "don't copy, be original." Charley was inducted into the Percussive Arts Society Hall of Fame in 1981 in the categories of Author, Education, Radio/TV, Rudimental, and Industry. William J. Schinstine dedicated a solo to Wilcoxon in 1968 called Charlie's Horse. Also in 1968, Philly Joe Jones recorded the first 8 bars of the Wilcoxon solo “Rolling in Rhythm” as a break in the track “Trailways Express” on a solo album.

== Notable students ==
Wilcoxon's students include drum set players like Philly Joe Jones, Joe Morello, John Bernard Riley, and Sadiq Abdu Shahid (formerly Archie Taylor Jr.), and orchestral percussionists such as Alan Abel (musician), Joseph Parlink and Robert Hohner.

== Publications ==
His books and solos are currently distributed by Ludwig Music

- The All American Drummer
- Modern Rudimental Swing Solos
- Wrist and Finger Stroke Control
- The Drummer on Parade
- Drum Method
- Rolling in Rhythm
- The Junior Drummer
- Drumming! Plus Hummin' a Tune
