= Percussion Creativ =

German percussion organization

- Percussion Creativ e.V.
- Predecessor: Association for the Promotion and Maintenance of Percussion
- Formation: December 11, 1986; 39 years ago
- Founder: Hermann Schwander
- VAT ID no.: VR 700661
- Purpose: Drums and Percussion Instruments Network
- Location: Freiburg, Germany
- Current President: Claus Hessler
- Managing Director: Michael Zöller
- Second Chairman: Jörg Fabig
- Treasurer: Stefan G. Schmid
- Board of directors: Domenico Russo, Johannes Fischer, Stefan Schwarzenberger, Ellen Meyer, Patrick Metzger, Stefan Landes
- Website: percussion-creativ.de

Percussion Creativ is a non-profit organization founded as a network for German-speaking drummers and percussionists, based in Freiburg im Breisgau. Their goal is to promote the music for percussion instruments and their interpreters through exchange, and networking, regardless of stylistic orientation. The association currently has around 1,000 members who come mostly from Germany. Percussion Creativ is the only association of its kind based in the German-speaking area and is similar to the Percussive Arts Society in the United States.

== History ==
Hermann Schwander founded the "Association for the Promotion and Maintenance of Percussion" in Nuremberg in 1986 in order to create a forum for exchanging views and encounters and to have an official sponsor for funding, donations and grants. [1] The founding members were beside Hermann Schwander director of the Nuremberg Meistersinger Conservatory Wolfgang Graetschel, Hans-Günter Brodmann, Tilo Heider, Sandor, the marimbist Mari Honda, and Renate Schwander. During a conference on December 11, 1986, in the Bavarian Music Academy in Hammelburg, "Percussion Creativ" was chosen as the new name for the association. Werner Thärichen, a former first solo timpanist of the Berlin Philharmonic, was elected the club's first president.

Claus Hessler has been president since 2016. In addition, Jörg Fabig as second chairman, Stefan G. Schmid as treasurer, Florian Alexandru-Zorn for marketing and Cord Radke as secretary are currently on the board. The managing director is Michael Zöller. The association's advisory board currently consists of Domenico Russo, Johannes Fischer, Stefan Schwarzenberger, Ellen Meyer, Patrick Metzger, and Stefan Landes.

Percussion Creativ, under the direction of Claus Hessler, released a set of drum rudiments called the Rudimental Codex in order to challenge the Percussive Arts Society interpretation of many rudiments of European origin, as well as promote the cultural heritage of French, German, and Swiss rudimental drumming. The Codex consists of 42 rudimental patterns, some of which are present in the American rudimental vocabulary (but with a guide for ancient interpretation) and some of which are unique to French or Swiss drumming. The Codex has been submitted to UNESCO as a vital piece of Europe's musical cultural heritage.
