= Claus Hessler =

German drummer, author, and teacher

Claus Hessler Claus Heßler
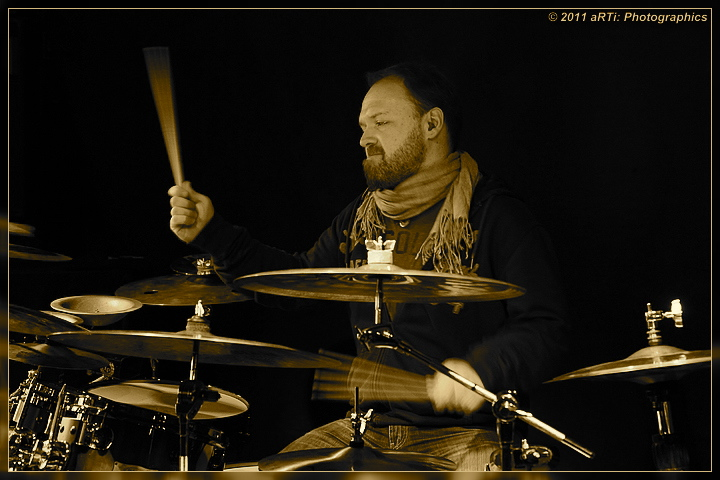
- A German drummer, author, and teacher

Background information
- Born: June 23, 1969 (age 56); Laufach, Germany
- Occupations: Musician, Teacher, Author
- Instruments: Drums, percussion
- Labels: Alfred Publishing, Wizdom Media
- Website: ClausHessler.com

Claus Hessler, also spelled Claus Heßler, is a German drummer, author, and teacher. He is a clinician who specializes in Open-handed drumming and rudimental drumming, especially Basel Drumming and Moeller method.

== Biography ==
Claus Hessler was born in Laufach, Bavaria, Germany, in 1969 and started playing the drums in 1973 at the age of 4. He studied the Moeller Method with Jim Chapin starting in 1990 and also developed an Open-Handed playing technique.

He published his first book with Dom Famularo in 2008, Open-Handed Playing Vol. 1, He followed its success with Daily Drumset Workout in 2011, which was nominated for a "Drummie" award in DRUM! magazine and also nominated for "Best Educational Book" in Modern Drummer magazine. In 2011, Hessler worked with Dom Famularo again to publish Open-Handed Playing Vol. 2 - A Step Beyond. He followed the success of his early books with a book/DVD combo called Drumming Kairos in 2013. Hessler received his second nomination for "Best Educational Book" in Modern Drummer magazine for his Camp Duty Update published in 2014 in German and 2017 in English, which explained, interpreted, and modernized the classic military rudimental camp duty calls. In 2018 Hessler published Taladiddle, a book comparing konnakol and rudiments.

Hessler works as a session musician and has played with artists such as Mike Stern, Herb Ellis, Randy Brecker, Ack van Rooyen, Matt Smith, Albert Mangelsdorff, Michael Sagmeister, Larry Coryell, Barbara Dennerlein, and the New York Voices, with whom he toured Europe. He has his own organ trio called Flux which released the CD "On Fire" in 2016. The trio is known to play in odd time signatures and use complex arrangements.

Hessler has been president of the organization Percussion Creativ since 2015. Percussion Creativ is based in Germany and seeks to promote percussion in German speaking areas of Europe, such as Germany, Austria, and Switzerland. Their Rudimental Codex, published in 2018 and supervised by Hessler, contains 42 rudiments that are indigenous to continental Europe along with an interpretations guide. Hessler teaches at Hochschule für Musik und Darstellende Kunst in Frankfurt and other higher education institutions. He is also a member of the Modern Drummer Education Team, a contributor to Drumscene Magazine and Drums and Percussion, and an endorser of Ahead products, Sabian Cymbals, Mapex Drums and Cooperman Drums, and Promark sticks where he has a signature stick.

== Publications ==
- Open-Handed Playing Vol. 1
- Open-Handed Playing Vol. 2 - A Step Beyond
- Daily Drumset Workout
- Drumming Kairos
- Camp Duty Update
- Flux - On Fire
- Taladiddle
