= Single-stroke =

Single-stroke may refer to:

- Single-stroke pneumatic rifle, an air gun for which one motion of the cocking lever is all that is needed to compress the air for propulsion
- Single-stroke roll, alternating sticking of indeterminate speed and length in rudimental drumming
