= H. C. Hart =

American drum major

H. C. Hart was an American drum major in the 71st New York Infantry during the American Civil War and an influential fife and drum manual author.

== Biography ==
Colonel H. C. Hart was educated as a military drummer at the military academy in Middletown, Connecticut under Professor Partridge. Hart was later praised for his instruction of the 102nd Regiment by its Drum Major Levi Elmendorf. Near the beginning of the Civil War (dates differ among sources) he was hired by Quartermaster George W. Rosevelt of the 71st Regiment of the New York State Militia to form a regimental band. Hart then set out to hire the best musicians he could find. In Connecticut, he hired Henry Chatfield, who he made leader and instructor, and fifers Hezekiah and Leslie Todd from the Wolcott Drum Band along with several other drummers and fifers. The balance of the band was gathered from around the state and several further members came from New York City.

The 71st was then attached to the Army of the Potomac, where General Grant saw them perform and reportedly commented: "Well boys, I never heard such a Hell of a racket from so few drums in my life." In order to help with the training of new musicians, Hart wrote and published his book, Col. H. C. Hart's New and Improved Instructor for the Drum with Original Notation, in either 1861 or 1862 (again, sources differ on the date). The book used a relatively obscure rudimental notation system that he learned from Wolcott Drum Band member Samuel Wilcox. Wolcox's notation system is a unique code that appears in no other known publication of any era. Despite the strange look of the notation, the book was well received by contemporary critics and colleagues, and continued to be used by the Wolcott Drum Band and the Moodus Fife and Drum Corps after the war.

Hart's Instructor also contained standard instruction for the fife, bugle, and uniquely for its era, bass drum, plus a number of popular tunes outside of the pure camp duty calls. The book was notable for its wide range of drum rudiments, some of which were unique to Hart, and its attention to the details necessary for complete beginners and students of otherwise low initial skill level.

== Publications ==
- Col. H. C. Hart's New and Improved Instructor for the Drum with Original Notation
