= Levi Lovering =

American drummer

- Born: December 22, 1776; Holliston, MA
- Died: 1857 (aged 80–81); Massachusetts
- Spouse: Sally Eames
- Writing career
- Years active: 1805-1823
- Genre: Drum Instruction
- Notable work: Drummer's Assistant or Art of Drumming Made Easy

Levi Lovering (1776–1857) was an American drummer and early rudimental drum manual author. His books helped bridge the gap between colonial British military drumming and post-revolutionary American drumming.

== Biography ==
Lovering was born in 1776 in Holliston, MA and was the son of Revolutionary War militia member Lieutenant Jesse Lovering and Marcie Jennings. He learned to play the drum from his father and cataloged 60 unique drum beatings between 1792 and 1805. He published this collection in a book called The Rule of the First Roll or Gamut for the Drum.

Lovering moved around between Massachusetts, Connecticut, and New York during his adult life, rarely able to maintain steady work. He married Sally Eames in 1802. Lovering and many of his family members suffered from a form of muscular atrophy known as Charcot-Marie-Tooth syndrome that limited their ability to walk. They referred to it as the "Lovering Curse."

In 1819, Lovering published his most famous work, Drummer's Assistant or Art of Drumming Made Easy, with Philadelphia's Bacon & Co. It featured what he called a "mode of notes" that he claimed to have invented. It consisted of a set of two staves on which he notated the rhythms for the right and left hands independently. Despite his claim, the notation style is actually quite similar to that of George Robbins, Isaac Day, and other sources from the late 18th and early 19th century, though not likely directly stolen or infringed upon. It was simply the standard practice of the time. The book was issued in a second edition in 1823 by J.G. Klemm.

Lovering's books have been referred to as sloppy and full of errors, and since he did not play the fife nor refer to fife tunes in his works, the drum beatings are not directly correlated to any precise version of the tunes they are based upon. The books were useful tools, however, since they were intended for self-taught drummers and contain information on technique. Other sources in this era sometimes relied on prose descriptions of drum beatings, so notation of any kind was helpful.

Later in life, Lovering and his sister reportedly scammed the U.S. government for their father's pension, which they received some portion of in 1856. Lovering died in 1857 in Massachusetts at the age of 80.

== Publications ==
- The Rule of the First Roll or Gamut for the Drum
- Drummer's Assistant or Art of Drumming Made Easy
