= Marty Hurley =

American drummer (1946-2011)

- Born: June 6, 1946; Neptune, New Jersey, United States
- Died: September 12, 2011 (aged 65) New Orleans, Louisiana
- Genres: drum and bugle corps, marching band
- Occupation: musician
- Instrument: percussion
- Years active: 1953–2011

Marty Hurley was an American percussionist, teacher, composer, and music clinician. He is best known for his work in the areas of marching percussion, rudimental drumming, drum & bugle corps, and marching band.

== Instruction ==
Since 1974, Marty had been the Director of Bands at Brother Martin High School in New Orleans, Louisiana. Hurley's bands have been consistent winners of sweepstakes awards at regional concert and marching competitions. During his time at Brother Martin, he has led 71 percussion students from his beginning percussion class to eventually become All State performers, and he received the Teacher of the Year award in 1999.

Marty had also acted as percussion instructor at Nicholls State University in Thibodaux, Louisiana, and twice judged the national finals of the Marching Bands of America contest, and the Percussive Arts Society National Marching Forum.

== Drum Corps ==
A former member of New Jersey's Blessed Sacrament's Golden Knights (he aged out in 1967) and of Hawthorne Caballeros in 1968, Marty served as percussion instructor for the Stardusters (Arabi, Louisiana) in 1971, the Bleu Raeders (Metairie, Louisiana) from 1972 to 1973, and the Black Knights (Belleville, Illinois) from 1973 to 1975. During his tenure as percussion instructor and arranger with the Phantom Regiment (Rockford, Illinois), the corps placed in the top ten nationally for 14 years at Drum Corps International finals competition in Denver, Philadelphia, Birmingham, Montreal, Miami, Madison, Kansas City, Buffalo and Dallas. In November 2002, Marty performed as a soloist on The Drummer's Heritage Concert at the Percussive Arts Society International Convention in Columbus, Ohio.

Marty was affiliated with various other corps over time, including the Neptune Shoreliners, the Asbury Park Hurricanes, the St. Joseph Modernaires, and the Jersey Cyclones.

== Death ==
At the time of his death, Marty was a Marching Percussion Clinician for Pearl Percussion, Sabian Cymbals, and his music and instructional videos are published by Row-Loff Productions. Mr. Hurley was the band director at Brother Martin High School in New Orleans, Louisiana until his death on September 12, 2011. Marty died on September 12, 2011, after suffering from a stroke and approximately a month of intensive care in the hospital.

Publishers of obituaries include the following: Drum Corps International, Percussive Arts Society, and Drum Corps Planet.

== Honors ==
In September 2004, Marty Hurley was inducted into the World Drum Corps Hall of Fame in Scranton, Pennsylvania. In 2010, Mr. Hurley was inducted into the Louisiana Music Educator's Association Hall of Fame based on his fine work at Brother Martin High School.

In August 2012, Marty Hurley was posthumously inducted into the Drum Corps International Hall of Fame at a ceremony in Indianapolis.

== Selected works ==
Title	Description	Grade	Source
"Phancy Phantom"	Snare Drum Solo	Medium Advanced	
"Phantom of the Phield"	Snare Drum Solo	Advanced	
"Phantom Phrenzy"	Snare Drum Solo	Advanced	
"Phantom Phire"	Snare Drum Solo	Extremely Advanced	

For all of Marty's compositions, go to Row-Loff's web site and search for "Marty Hurley".
