= George Barrett Bruce =

American drummer

- Born: George Bruce Barrett; 1815 or 1816; Baltimore City, Maryland
- Died: June 23, 1884; Baltimore, Maryland
- Occupations: Author, Drum Major, Union Army Soldier, Silversmith, Printer
- Writing career
- Period: American Civil War
- Genres: Drum and Percussion Instruction
- Notable works: The Drummers' and Fifers' Guide

George B. Bruce was an American Army drum major during the Civil War. Bruce is best known for co-writing The Drummer's and Fifer's Guide with Daniel Decatur Emmett.

== Career ==
George Bruce, real name George Barrett, was taught to play the drum by drum major Riggs in the Baltimore area. Bruce served in the Maryland Dragoons under tumultuous circumstances between 1836 and 1843. Bruce's book, The Guide was published in 1862, and remains well known as a source for music for the fife and drum. It was the second book in history to use the word "rudiment" in conjunction with short, named exercises for the snare drum, the first being Charles Stewart Ashworth's A New Useful and Complete System of Drum Beating. The book also was one of the first to advocate playing rudiments Open, closed, open, a practice method popular today, and the first to record the Flamacue. According to the cover of his book Bruce (potentially dubiously) served in the 7th Regiment N.Y.S.M. (National Guard) Band and he is also listed as the Principal Drum Instructor at Bedloe's and the U.S. Army at the Eastern School of Practice on Governor's Island in New York Harbor. See Controversy section below. Bruce was a player of the drums, banjo, violin and mandolin. Bruce served as the drum major for the 22nd New York Infantry Regiment in 1863 and as the drum major for the 5th Maryland Infantry Regiment. He died in 1884 in Baltimore City, MD at the age of 68.

His work influenced Sanford A. Moeller of the Moeller Method of drumming, in the publisher's note of Moeller's own book he speaks highly Bruce's method of drum instruction, and indeed, Moeller's book has some similarity to Bruce and Emmett's The Drummers' and Fifers' Guide, in that both have lengthy treatments of the rudiments, and many of the pieces in Bruce's book also appear in Moeller's. Moeller is quoted as having said that Bruce and Emmett, "saved American drumming."

== Controversy ==
George Bruce's resume and qualifications have been questioned by some modern groups, and he appears to have regularly interchanged his middle name with his surname, though many publications on rudimental drumming adhere to Bruce's own fictitious account of his qualifications. Bruce's birth name was George B. Barrett (b. 1815 or 1816 in Baltimore) and he changed his name after deserting his post in Maryland's 2nd Regiment of Dragoons in 1836. He was later "apprehended" in 1842. A soldier named George Barrett served in the 7th Regiment N.Y.S.M. as Bruce had claimed to do, but this was unlikely to be the same man as the age and rank of the potential soldier are incorrect. Bruce served under his new name as a drum major in the 22nd Regiment N.Y.S.M. in 1863, though his post with the 22nd is not listed in his book. The drum and fife instructors on Governor's Island during the Civil War were known to be Sergeant Henke and Sergeant Michael Moore, of the eponymous Henke-Moore Manuscript, and not George Bruce as he claimed. Moore had been at Governor's Island since 1841. Fort Wood on Bedloe's Island, now known as Liberty Island, was an ordinance depot during the Civil War. George's position with the 5th Regiment was under the name Barrett, even though the Regiment acknowledged that he was the author of the book written under the name Bruce. After his military career, all references to him, including his obituary, use the name Barrett. The question as to Bruce's backstory had been raised in the 1920s but was largely ignored by contemporary drummers.
