= Sanford A. Moeller =

American drummer (1878–1960)

Sanford Augustus Moeller (1878–1960) was an American rudimental drummer, national champion, educator, and author. He was born in Albany, New York on February 16, 1878, and he began his music education by studying the piano.

While still a young man, Moeller also learned the snare drum and studied with August Helmicke. He served in the Spanish–American War. Later, Moeller moved to New York, playing vaudeville shows with George M. Cohan. He also played for the Metropolitan Opera House and the Seventh Regimental Army Band.

He is known for the Moeller method, which primarily documents the way of playing snare drum in the army, particularly in the Civil War.

Moeller's pupils included Gene Krupa and Jim Chapin.

== Drum instruction ==
"The belief that anyone can beat a drum is discouragingly popular!" - Sanford Augustus "Gus" Moeller

Gus Moeller is usually associated with the "Moeller method" or "Moeller technique" (considered by some to be a misnomer), which advocates the use of "ancient" snare drumming techniques that can be used by drummers when playing a drum kit.

In 1925, Moeller compiled and wrote "Instructor in the art of snare drumming". It was reprinted in June 1950 by Leedy and Ludwig under the name "The Moeller Book: The art of snare drumming". A heavily revised and abridged edition of The Moeller Book is still available from Ludwig Masters and a much longer first edition of Instructor in the Art of Snare Drumming has also been reproduced and published independently.

Moeller's unique point of view was that he considered drum students, who were learning to drum correctly, to be students of eurhythmics. Moeller based his lessons and instruction around a playing style used by drummers who had served in the American Civil War.

Moeller's book speaks highly, in the publisher's note, of George Bruce's method of drum instruction, and indeed, the book has some similarity to Bruce and Emmett's The Drummers' and Fifers' Guide, in that both have lengthy treatments of the rudiments, and many of the pieces in Bruce's book also appear in Moeller's.

This particular field drumming style arrived in the United States during the time of the American Revolutionary War. The "open style" approach and little finger stick grip are the trademarks regarding this "ancient" style of drumming. The roots of this approach stem from Europe, and go back to before the 18th century.

One of Moeller's pupils, Allen Paley, said, "Moeller... understood the instrument, as well as a surgeon, does the human body. His system, which you had to modify to play sitting down — he normally stood — was a matter of three strokes that you brought together in a smooth flow. Gene [Krupa] warned me not to let Moeller's method to overpower me; it originally was fashioned for parade and concert drummers. To play with dance and jazz bands, you had to modify what Moeller taught and proceed from there."

The two primary modifications that most drummers make regarding Moeller's method are to use the thumb fulcrum for both hands (matched grip) and to level the snare, instead of continuing to play the snare drum set up slanted or on an angle.

Though Moeller recommended standing when practicing, he shows that some of his pupils, such as concert and jazz band members, opted for sitting. These facts show that Moeller allowed for two right-hand grips in his lessons (his book shows a picture of him seated at a snare drum showing a right-hand thumb fulcrum grip). In other words, the little finger grip was not the only grip Moeller recognized when working with his pupils.

== Drum building ==
Moeller was also an expert drum builder. He made several deep marching snares and matching bass drums. Today, his vintage-style rope drums are still being played by marching organizations.

The Mount Kisco Ancient Fife and Drum Corps has the best-known collection of Moeller drums, which are still being played today.

The Lancraft Fife and Drum Corps, of which Moeller was a member from 1930 to 1935, purchased five snare drums at $85.00 each (~$830.00 each in 2021 dollars) from Moeller, who delivered them personally on August 8, 1954. These drums are still in use today and have merged with "Buck" Soistman and Bill Reamer drums since then, "showing a definite on-going drum building style and lineage that was initiated by Moeller". Gus Moeller built Grand Army of the Republic drums for the United States Army Band. The Army's drums were used in President Kennedy's funeral. One of the drums used is on display at the Smithsonian Museum in Washington D.C.

== Moeller's pupils ==
Moeller's pupils included jazz drummers such Gene Krupa and Jim Chapin. Chapin's book, Advanced Techniques for the Modern Drummer, Vol 1, Coordinated Independence includes a dedication to Moeller. He also taught William F. Ludwig, Sr.
