= Grip (percussion) =

Percussion playing technique

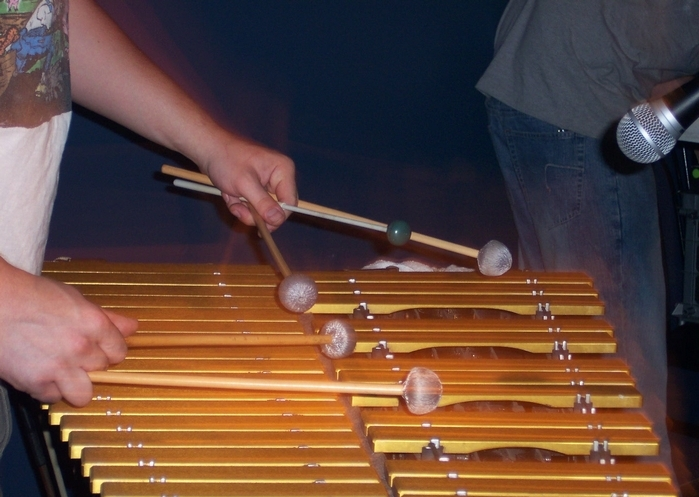
Five mallets in use on a vibraphone

In percussion, grip refers to the manner in which the player holds the sticks or mallets, whether drum sticks or other mallets.

For some instruments, such as triangles and gongs, only a single mallet or beater is normally used, held either in one hand or both for larger beaters. For others, such as snare drums, two beaters are often used, one in each hand. More rarely, more than one beater may be held in one hand. For example, when four mallets are used on a vibraphone, or when a kit drummer performs a cymbal roll by holding two soft sticks in one hand while keeping a rhythm with the other.

== Matched or unmatched ==
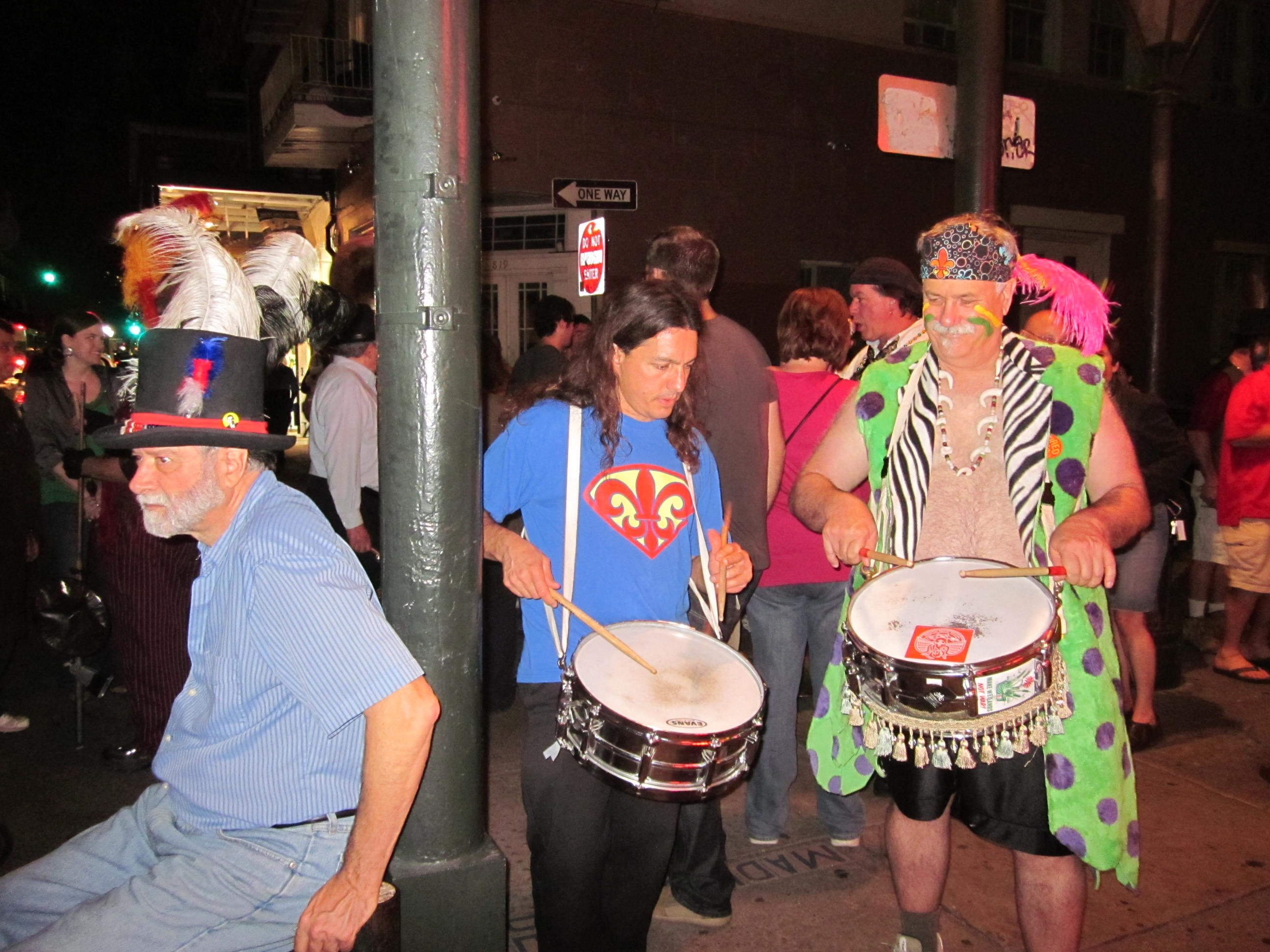
Traditional grip (left) and matched grip (right) in use by side drummers

When two identical beaters are used, one in each hand, there are two main varieties of grip:

- Unmatched grips, known as traditional grips because of their association with traditional snare drum and drum kit playing, in which the right and left hands grip the sticks in different ways, often one underhand and one overhand.
- Matched grips in which the hands hold the sticks in similar, mirror image fashion.

== Traditional grip ==
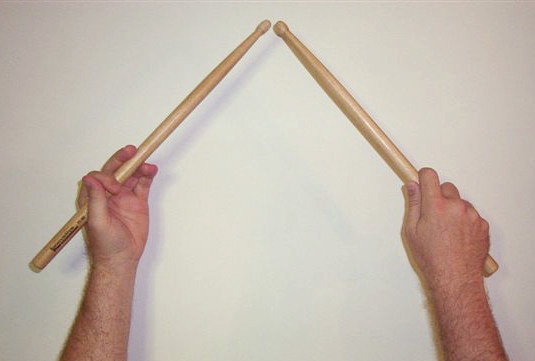
Traditional grip

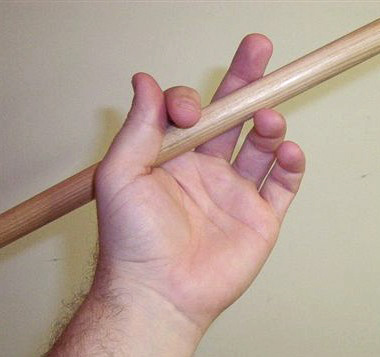
detail, highlighting the signature 'underhand' grip of the style

Traditional grip (also known as orthodox grip or conventional grip, fundamental grip and, to a lesser extent, the jazz grip) is a technique used to hold drum sticks while playing percussion instruments. Unlike matched grip, each hand holds the stick differently. Commonly, the right hand uses an overhand grip and the left hand uses an underhand grip. Traditional grip is almost exclusively used to play the snare drum, especially the marching snare drum, and the jazz drum kit. Traditional grip is more popular in jazz drumming than in other drum kit styles due to the early jazz drummers evolving their style from marching and military styles and instrumentation, although it is also used by several rock drummers.

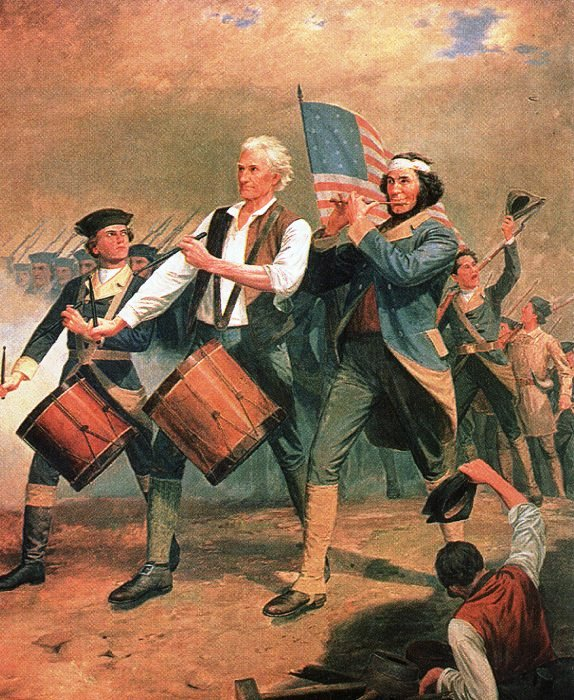
Traditional grip. This is a good example of the ancient style that Moeller describes. Note the angle of the snare drum, which makes the traditional grip of the left hand necessary, since matched grip would be difficult to use. Also note the positioning of the right hand, which looks like the little finger grip (See Moeller's book for more information, as well as George B. Bruce).

This grip is called traditional because it originates from military marching drummers who carried a snare drum on a sling hung from the neck or one shoulder, with the drum riding closer to one hip than the other and tilted slightly for easier reach. This allowed the drummer to play the drum and march without banging their knees or thighs into the drum. Due to that drum position, using an overhand grip on the high (left) side of the drum would force the elbow into a very awkward position while an underhand grip is much more comfortable. Even when the drum is on a stand, many drummers will tilt their drum when using traditional grip. Although tilting is not required, it helps align the shoulders and spine thus being more ergonomic. Many drummers use traditional grip on drums that are perfectly horizontal, especially in marching percussion.

With the underhand grip, there are several different techniques employed which involve slight variations in finger positioning and usage. Common with all techniques is the usage of the wrist in rotating (a motion like turning a door knob) as the fundamental motion of the stick. Once the stick has started moving, more involved techniques require the exclusive use of the thumb for bouncing the stick when playing at a faster tempo. The stick then rests in the space between the thumb and index finger, and the two fingers close around the stick with the thumb atop the index at the first knuckle. The middle finger then rests slightly on the top side of the stick (typically the side fingertip is the only contact made). The stick then rests on the cuticle of the ring finger with the little finger supporting the ring finger from below.

Sanford A. Moeller (whose book discusses the Moeller method or Moeller technique) suggests that one should learn the traditional grip 'ancient style', as well ... where the overhand grip should hold or grip the drumstick almost entirely with the little finger.

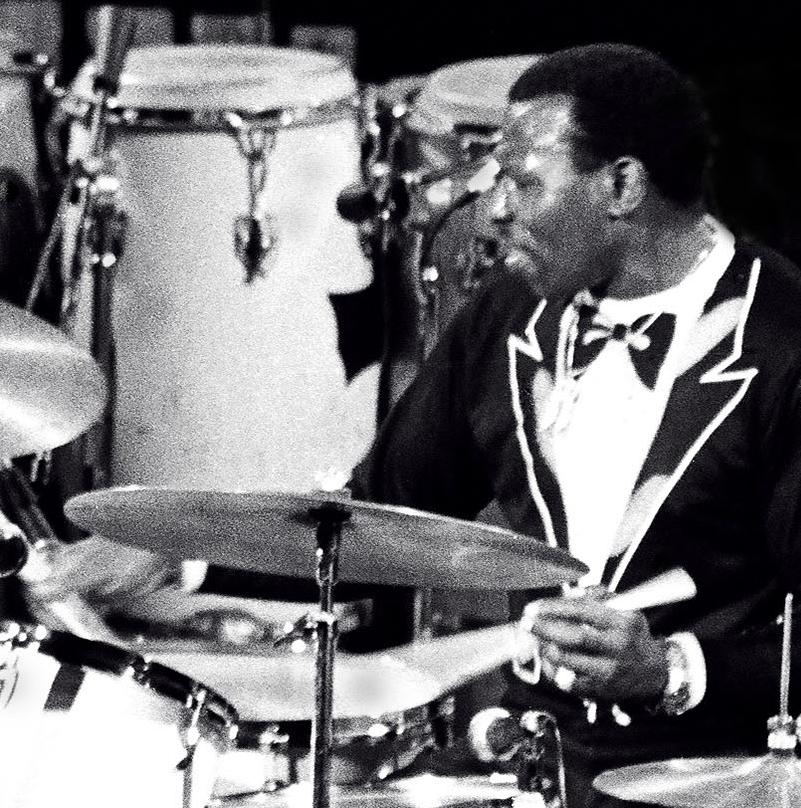
Elvin Jones playing drum kit using traditional grip, 1976

Some Scottish pipe band players have a variation on the traditional left hand grip in which the underhand grip is played entirely with the thumb on top of the stick, utilizing no other fingers for downward pressure. This suits the pipe band's light and snappy style of playing well, but is not as suitable for American style drum corps playing or jazz drumming on a full kit.

Traditional grip can also be useful when playing with brushes in a stirring motion. Normally this style is used in a jazz context. The underhand grip naturally angles the left hand further away from the right hand than would matched grip and allows more room for crossovers and sweeping maneuvers across the surface of the drum.

Physiologically, the traditional left underhand grip uses fewer muscles than the right overhand grip and this causes each muscle to do a larger percentage of the work. Matched grip is therefore technically easier to play, though for reasons stated above, it is not always the superior choice for every application.

== Matched grip ==
Matched grip (also known as parallel grip) is a method of holding drum sticks and mallets to play percussion instruments. In the matched grip, each hand holds the stick in the same way, whereas in the traditional grip, each hand holds the stick differently. Almost all commonly used matched grips are overhand grips. Specific forms of the grip are French grip, German grip, and American grip.

The matched grip is performed by gripping the drum sticks with one's index finger and middle finger curling around the bottom of the stick and the thumb on the top. This allows the stick to move freely and bounce after striking a percussion instrument. Any of the major grips below can be played with an index finger fulcrum, a middle finger fulcrum, or a combination of both. The fulcrum can also be placed on the first or second knuckles of the primary fulcrum finger. These options lead to many technical variations in playing position. All of the grips, with all of the fulcrum variations, apply to the right hand of traditional grip as well.

=== French grip ===
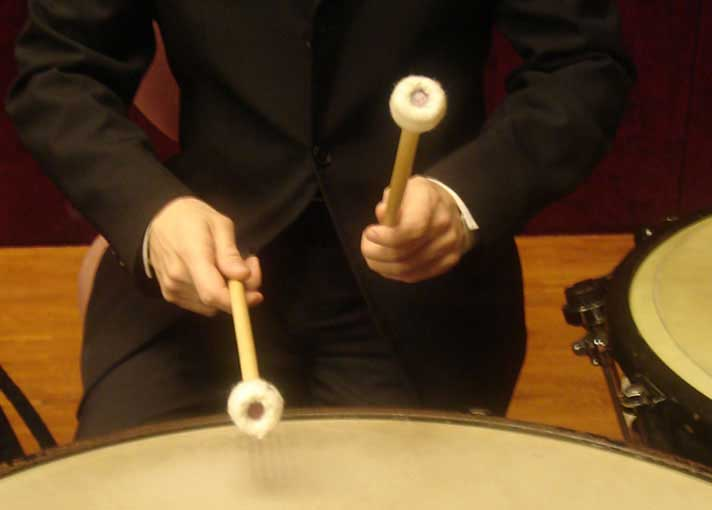
French grip in use by a timpanist

In French grip, the palms of the hands face directly toward each other and the stick is moved primarily with the fingers rather than the wrist as in German grip. This allows a greater degree of finesse and the addition of forearm rotation to the stroke, which is why many timpanists prefer French grip. This grip uses the smaller and faster finger muscles. It also comes in handy for playing fast tempos, including for swing or jazz on the ride cymbal. For louder strokes, the wrist rotates much in the same way as when hammering a nail.

=== German grip ===
In German grip, the palms of the hands are parallel to the drumhead or other playing surface, and the stick is moved primarily with the wrist. German grip provides a large amount of power, but sacrifices the speed provided by the use of the fingers as in French grip. It is used when power is the primary concern, such as when playing a bass drum. This is also the primary grip for the Moeller method. German grip provides a wide dynamic range, achieving the control necessary for pianissimo passages without the need for much rebound from the drum and also allowing for very loud fortissimo strokes from the arm.

=== American grip ===
American grip is a hybrid of the French grip and German grip. The palms of the hands typically are at about a 45-degree angle to the drum and both the fingers and wrist are used to move the stick. This grip is considered a general-purpose grip by percussionists because it combines the power and larger wrist motion of the German grip with the quick finger strokes of the French grip. Each element of the stroke, finger or wrist motion, can be isolated as needed. It is widely used on membranophone instruments (drums).

== Usage ==
Single-beater grips are common for:

- Gongs
- Triangle
- Bass drum

Unmatched grips are common for:

- Marching snare drum
- Drum kit
- Korean janggu drum (using dissimilar beaters)
- Orchestral and Concert Bass Drum (Gran Cassa or Große Trommel), but only for sustained rolls or while sitting.

Matched grips are common for:

- Snare drum
- Drum kit
- Glockenspiel, Xylophone and Vibraphone
- Tenor drum
- Bass drum
- Timpani
