= Basel drum =

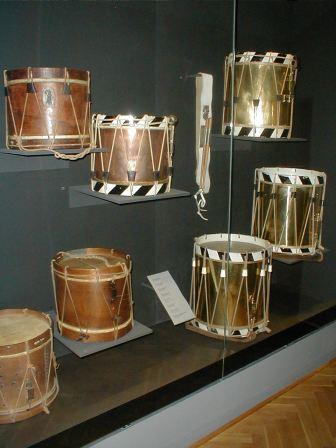
Different kinds of Basler drums

The Basel drum (also known as the Basler or Basle drum) is a two-headed rope-tension drum. It takes its name from its origin in Basel, Switzerland. This percussion instrument is best known from the Carnival of Basel, where it is played by more than 2,000 drummers. They are called Tambouren in Swiss German or Tambours in French. There is no typical number of players for marching-bands including this instrument. Anything between three and fifty drummers may be seen in such a formation.

Drums of the same pattern are used throughout Switzerland in fife and drum (or drum only) societies as well as in Swiss Army bands. They are also known as 'Swiss drums' or 'Ordonance 82'.

== Method of construction ==
Until the late 18th century drums were primarily made of wood. However, it has been demonstrated that brass frames were in use in Prussia since the early 18th century. In the 19th century, copper, tin, and nickel silver were also used. Nowadays, the frame is usually made of chromed brass. There are also frames made from non-chromed brass, aluminum (weight advantage), and recently even carbon fiber. For some time, the wooden drum has been gaining popularity. Not only because of the look, but also because of its much lower weight. In addition, the drier sound of the wooden drum is perceived as pleasant by many drummers.

The counterhoops of the metal drums are mostly painted in black and white diagonal stripes – black and white being the heraldic colors of Basel. In other cantons (districts) of Switzerland other colors are used accordingly. The Swiss army uses red and white striped hoops. Colors of guilds or family crests are only rarely used today. The hoops on wooden drums are usually left natural. While the color scheme formerly strictly obeyed heraldry and an exception was tolerated only for wooden drums, today anything goes. However, chrome frames with black and white tires and black or white tugs continue to dominate the scene.

There are two drumheads, which are stretched over the two open ends of the frame (also called "kettle" or "bucket" in Basel). The heads are made of plastic or calfskin parchment. Calf skins are enjoyable to play on due to their softer rebound. However, natural drumheads can be used only in dry weather, otherwise they will be flabby. In practice, therefore, the player of a calfskin-headed drum needs to have access to a second drum with plastic heads.

The drumheads are held together and tuned by a rope, made of polyester or hemp, which passes through the holes in the hoops. Today, the hemp rope has a carbon core to minimize weather-related tension differences. In earlier times the rope was simply wrapped around the tires or attached by means of an iron hook on it. To tension the ropes, the hoops are compressed in a special 'manual, pneumatic press-system'.

Until the 19th century marching drums in Europe and the colonies in general had this type of construction. In the course of time, the ropes were replaced by tuning screws called "tension rods".

In the snare drums, the snare-sound is produced by gut and metal strings, which vibrate against the bottom drumhead. The top batter head can be damped with a felt pad which is fixed under the skin. With the help of a wheel on the outside of the frame, the intensity of the damping can be adjusted. Another damping method involves a strip of felt, which is clamped transversely under the batter head. The Basel drum in tenor configuration removes the snares at the bottom.

The diameter of the drum is measured on the outside of the frame and is usually 40 or 41 cm (about 16 inches), sometimes 42 or even 43 cm (up to 17 inches). The height of the frame generally corresponds to the diameter.

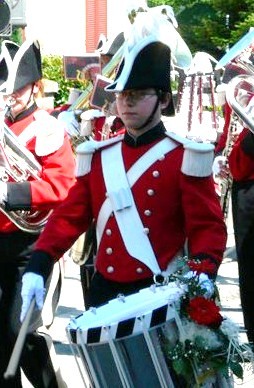
A Swiss drummer marking time with a Basel drum

== History ==
The oldest drum of this type dates back to 1571. It can be seen in the Basel Music Museum. In Switzerland church festivals, carnival parades, guild ceremonies, and public events incorporating dancing, games and entertainment have traditionally been accompanied by the sound of the Basel snare drums.

== Playing ==
The drum is worn traditionally on a sling, which is carried over the right shoulder, down to the left hip. By mounting the drum on its hoop, it hangs down diagonally to the right, as seen by the drummer. Owing to the diagonal position of the drum, the traditional grip must be applied regardless of stick used.

The Basel drum is configured into a marching snare drum, which is played by sticks and the common type used by Swiss fife and drum corps, or a marching single tenor drum played with the soft mallets or drum sticks.
