= Snare drum =

Type of percussion instrument

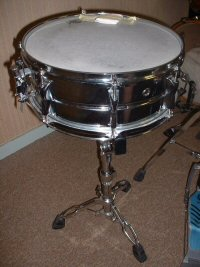
- A drum kit snare drum

Percussion instrument
- Other names: Field drum, side drum
- Classification: Percussion; Drum; Unpitched
- Hornbostel–Sachs classification: 211.212.11 (Individual double-skin cylindrical drums, one skin used for playing)
- Developed: 13th century

Related instruments
- Tabor

The snare drum (or side drum) is a percussion instrument that produces a sharp staccato sound when the top head is struck with a drum stick which is held under tension against the lower head. Snare drums are often used in orchestras, concert bands, marching bands, parades, drumlines, drum corps, and more. It is one of the central pieces in a drum set, a collection of percussion instruments designed to be played by a seated drummer and used in many genres of music. Because basic rhythms are very easy to learn to play on a snare drum even for children, the instrument is also suitable for the music education for young children and for a rhythm band.

Snare drums are usually played with drum sticks, but other beaters, such as the brush or the rute, can be used to achieve different tones. Its sensitivity and responsiveness make the snare a versatile, expressive instrument, able to respond audibly to the softest strokes, even with a wire brush. It can be used for complex rhythmic patterns and engaging solos at moderate volumes. Its high dynamic range allows the player to produce powerful accents with vigorous strokes and a loud metallic click with the rimshot.

The snare drum originates from the tabor, a drum first used to accompany the flute. The tabor evolved into more modern versions, such as the kit snare (the type usually included in a drum kit), marching snare, tarol snare, soprano snare, and piccolo snare. Each type is of a different size, and there are different playing styles associated with each of them. The snare drum that one might see in a popular music concert is usually played on the backbeat (counts 2 and 4 or in slower tempi on count 3). In marching bands, snare drummers play only the snare, unlike kit drummers, so their playing is often more involved; for example, they may play accent patterns of 16th and triplet eighth notes.

The rope-tension field drum is the tallest and heaviest kind. The kit and the concert snare drums are each generally 14" across and 5" to 8" deep, while the soprano snare is about 7" deep but only 12" across. The piccolo snare has a shell 13" to 14" across but only around 4" tall and a higher pitch than the others, excepting the occasionally seen "firecracker" or “pancake” snare, an even smaller, auxiliary snare drum as shallow as the piccolo and just 10" to 12" across. The snare drum is easily recognizable by its loud cracking sound when struck firmly with a drumstick or mallet. The depth of the sound varies from one drum to another because of the different playing techniques and types of beaters used, as well as differences in the drum's construction, as in head material and tension, dimensions, and rim and drum shell materials and manufacture.

The snare drum is constructed of two heads—both usually made of Mylar plastic in modern drums but historically made from calf or goat skin—along with a rattle of beads (metal, plastic, nylon, or gut) called "snares" in close contact with it, on the bottom head, which vibrate when the drum is struck. The snares can also be on the top, as in the tarol snare drum, or on both heads as in the case of the Highland snare drum. The top head is typically called the batter head because that is where the drummer strikes it; the bottom head can also be called the snare head if the snares are located there. The tension of each head is held constant by tension rods. Tension rod adjustment allows the pitch and tonal character of the drum to be customized by the player. Most snare drums have a lever (the strainer) to engage or disengage contact between the snares and the head, which also permits adjustment of the snare tension. When the snares are disengaged, the sound of the drum resembles that of a floor tom-tom. The rim is the metal or wooden ring around the batter head that holds the head onto the drum and provides tension to the head; the rim can also be used in some playing techniques, notably the rimshot, in which the head and rim are struck together with a single stick to create a strong, accented tone, and the cross-stick, in which the rim is struck with a stick held across the head to produce a high-pitched click.

== Playing ==
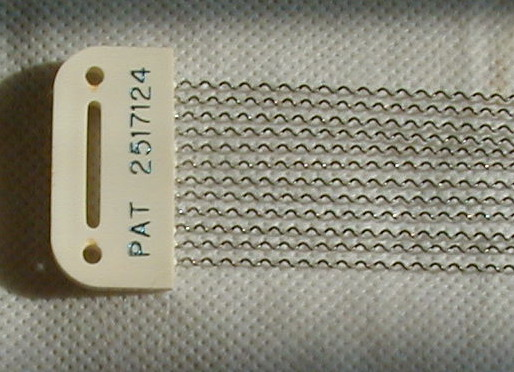
Snare wires, removed from the drum

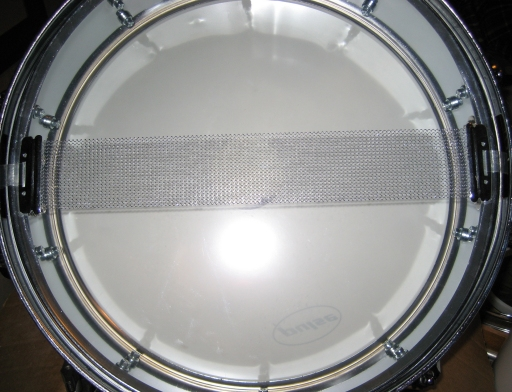
Snare wires, attached

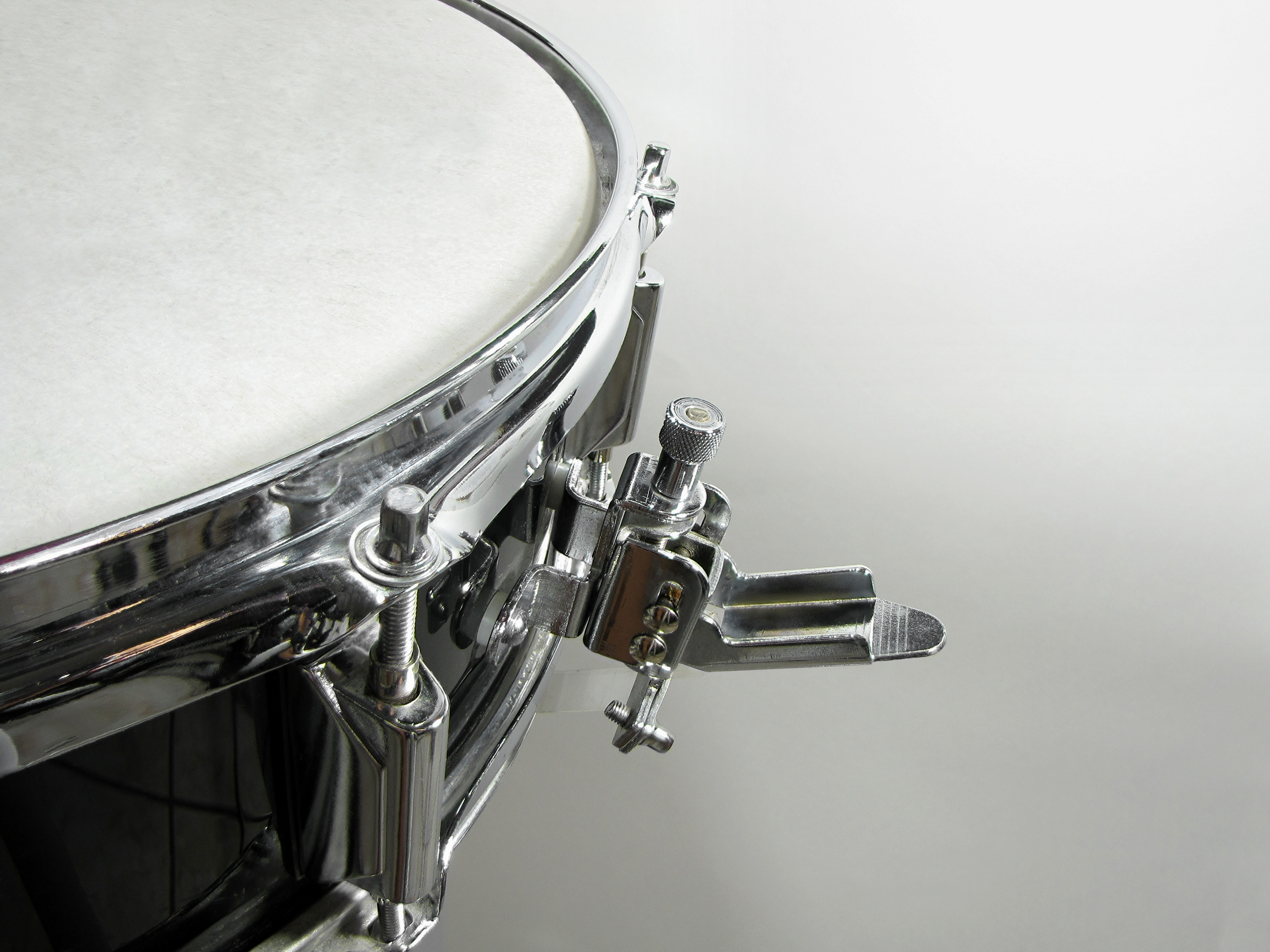
Snare strainer

When the top head is struck, the bottom (resonant) head vibrates in tandem, which in turn stimulates the snares and produces a cracking sound.

The drum can be played by striking it with a drum stick or any other form of beater, including brushes, rute and hands, all of which produce a softer-sounding vibration from the snare wires. When using a stick, the drummer may strike the head of the drum, the rim (counterhoop), or the shell.

The snares can be thrown off (disengaged) with a lever on the strainer so that the drum produces a sound reminiscent of a tom-tom. Rimshots are a technique associated with snare drums in which the head and rim are struck simultaneously with one stick (or in orchestral concert playing, a stick placed on the head and the rim struck by the opposite stick). In contemporary and/or pop and rock music, where the snare drum is used as a part of a drum kit, many of the backbeats and accented notes on the snare drum are played as rimshots, due to the ever-increasing demand for their typical sharp and high-volume sound.

A commonly used alternative way to play the snare drum is known as "cross-stick", "rim click", or "side-stick". This is done by holding the tip of the drumstick against the drum head and striking the stick's other end (the butt) against the rim, using the hand to mute the head. This produces a dry high-pitched click, similar to a set of claves, and is especially common in Latin and jazz music. So-called "ghost notes" are very light "filler notes" played in between the backbeats in genres such as funk and rhythm and blues. The iconic drum roll is produced by alternately bouncing the sticks on the drum head, striving for a controlled rebound. A similar effect can be achieved by playing alternating double strokes on the drum, creating a double stroke roll, or very fast single strokes, creating a single stroke roll. The snares are a fundamental ingredient in the pressed (buzz) drum roll, as they help to blend together distinct strokes that are then perceived as a single, sustained sound. The snare drum is the first instrument to learn in preparing to play a full drum kit. Rudiments are sets of basic patterns often played on a snare drum.

== Construction ==
Snare drums may be made from various wood, metal, acrylic, or composite, e.g., fiberglass materials. A typical diameter for snare drums is 14 in (36 cm). Marching snare drums are deeper (taller) in size than snare drums normally used for orchestral or drum kit purposes, often measuring 12 in deep (tall). Orchestral and drum kit snare drum shells are about 6 in (15 cm) deep. Piccolo snare drums are even shallower at about 3 in (7.6 cm) deep. Soprano, popcorn, and firecracker snare drums have diameters as small as 8 in (20 cm) and are often used for higher-pitched special effects.

Most wooden snare drum shells are constructed in plies (layers) that are heat- and compression-moulded into a cylinder. Steam-bent shells consist of one ply of wood that is gradually rounded into a cylinder and glued at one seam. Reinforcement rings, so-called "re-rings", are often incorporated on the inside surface of the drum shell to keep it perfectly round. Segment shells are made of multiple stacks of segmented wood rings. The segments are glued together and rounded out by a lathe. Similarly, stave shells are constructed of vertically glued pieces of wood into a cylinder (much like a barrel) that is also rounded out by a lathe. Solid shells are constructed of one solid piece of hollowed wood.

The heads or skins used are a batter head (the playing surface on the top of the drum) and a resonant (bottom) head. The resonant head is usually much thinner than the batter head and is not beaten while playing. Rather than calfskin, most modern drums use plastic (Mylar) skins of around 10 mils thickness, sometimes with multiple plies (usually two) of around 7 mils for the batter head. In addition, tone control rings or dots can be applied, either on the outer or inner surface of the head, to control overtones and ringing, and can be found positioned in the centre or close to the edge hoops or both. Resonant heads are usually only a few mils thick, to enable them to respond to the movement of the batter head as it is played. Pipe band requirements have led to the development of a Kevlar-based head, enabling very high tuning, thus producing a very high-pitched cracking snare sound.

A new technique used to improve the sound quality during snare drum construction is symmetrical venting. In contrast to a standard single vent hole, air can easily travel through and around the instrument without getting caught. This rapid movement creates a smoother, stronger sound.

== History ==
The snare drum seems to have descended from a medieval drum called the tabor, which was a drum with a single-gut snare strung across the bottom. It is a little bigger than a medium tom and was first used in war, often played with a fife (pipe); the player would play both the fife and drum (see also Pipe and tabor). Tabors were not always double-headed and not all may have had snares. By the 15th century, the size of the snare drum had increased and had a cylindrical shape. This simple drum with a simple snare became popular with the Swiss mercenary troops who used the fife and drum from the 15th to 16th centuries. The drum was made deeper and carried along the side of the body. Further developments appeared in the 17th century, with the use of screws to hold down the snares, giving a brighter sound than the rattle of a loose snare. During the 18th century, the snare drum underwent changes which improved its characteristic sound. Metal snares appeared in the 20th century. Today the snare drum is used in jazz, pop music, and modern orchestral music.

Drum – Cadence A

Drum – Cadence B

Drum – Four Flams
Snare drum cadences performed by the United States Navy Band

Much of the development of the snare drum and its rudiments is closely tied to the use of the snare drum in the military. In his book, The Art of Snare Drumming, Sanford A. Moeller (of the "Moeller method" of drumming) states, "To acquire a knowledge of the true nature of the [snare] drum, it is absolutely necessary to study military drumming, for it is essentially a military instrument and its true character cannot be brought out with an incorrect method. When a composer wants a martial effect, he instinctively turns to the drums."

Before the advent of radio and electronic communications, the snare drum was often used to communicate orders to soldiers. American troops were woken up by drum and fife playing about five minutes of music, for example, the well-known Three Camps. Troops were called for meals by certain drum pieces, such as "Peas on a Trencher" or "Roast Beef". A piece called the "Tattoo" was used to signal that all soldiers should be in their tents, and the "Fatigue Call" was used to police the quarters or drum unruly women out of the camp.

Many of these military pieces required a thorough grounding in rudimental drumming; indeed Moeller states that: "They [the rudimental drummers] were the only ones who could do it [play the military camp duty pieces]". He says further, "No matter how well a drummer can read, if he does not know the rudimental system of drumming, it is impossible for him to play 'The Three Camps', 'Breakfast Call', or in fact any of the Duty except the simple beats such as 'The Troop'."

During the late 18th and 19th centuries, the military bugle largely supplanted the snare and fife for signals. Most modern militaries and scouting groups use the bugle alone to make bugle calls that announce scheduled and unscheduled events of the organization (from First Call to Taps). While most modern military signals use only the bugle, the snare is still retained for some signals, for example, the Adjutant's Call.

Snare drumheads were originally made from calfskin. The invention of the plastic (Mylar) drumhead is credited to a drummer named Marion "Chick" Evans, who made the first plastic drumhead in 1956.

Drum rudiments seem to have developed with the snare drum; the Swiss fife and drum groups are sometimes credited with their invention. The first written rudiment was drawn up in Basel, Switzerland in 1610. Rudiments with familiar names—such as the single paradiddle, flam, drag, ratamacue, and double stroke roll, also called the "ma-ma da-da" roll—are listed in Charles Ashworth's book in 1812.

== Definitions ==
- Military drum/field drum: a snare drum with a diameter of 14–16 in and 9–16 in deep, with a wood or metal shell and the two heads stretched by tensioning screws. It has a snare-release lever to activate or deactivate a minimum of eight metal, gut, or plastic snares. The term came into use in 1837 with the invention of the tensioning-screw mechanism. While it frequently placed on a stand, it can also be played without the stand, screws and the lever in marching configuration. Also called a Tamburo Militare in Italian, a Militär-Trommel in German, a Tambor in Spanish, a Tamboer in Dutch or a Tambour Militaire or Tambour D'ordonannce in French, or uncommonly a Street Drum in English.
- Side drum: a common British and Scottish Highlands term for a snare drum. Also known as a Piccolo Cassa or Tamburo Piccolo in Italian, Kleine Trommel in German, Caja in Spanish, or Caisse Claire in French. Refers commonly to an orchestral snare drum in America, while in the Commonwealth it refers to a marching snare.
- Tabor: a large drum with a single snare on the batter head used in the Middle Ages and sometimes called for in orchestral repertoire. Also known as a Tenor Drum, a Tamburello in Italian, a Tamburin in German, or a Tambourin Provençal in French. Not to be confused with the Scottish pipe band tenor drum which has no snare.

== Types ==
There are many types of snare drums, for example:

- Marching snare ("regular" and "high tension")

Marching snares are typically 12 in (30 cm) deep and 14 in (36 cm) wide. The larger design allows for a deeper-sounding tone, one that is effective for marching bands. Many marching snares are built to withstand high amounts of tension, tightened by a drum key. They are often played with a heavier and thicker stick, more commonly referred to as "marching sticks". Snares are often nylon or gut.

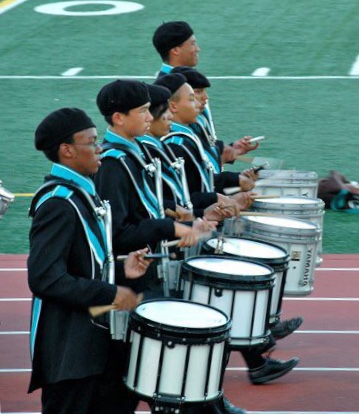
A line of marching snare drums in a high school marching band

- Pipe band snare

Similar to a marching snare, pipe band snares are deep and tuned quite tightly. The major difference is that they feature a second set of snare wires beneath the batter head, along with the normal set on the resonant head. This gives them an even more crisp and snappy sound. Snare drummers form an integral part of pipe bands, accompanying the bagpipes, and playing music written to fit the pipe tunes. A bass drummer and several tenor drummers, who also perform visual representations of the music, known as flourishing, add to the percussion section of a pipe band. The music played by pipe band snare drummers can be technically difficult, and requires a high degree of rudimental ability, similar to that of marching bands. Pipe Band snare normally use the traditional grip.

- Drum kit snare

Drum kit snares are usually about a third to half the depth of a marching snare. They are typically 14 in (36 cm) in diameter and 5, 5 1/2, 6, 6 1/2 or 7 in (13, 14, 15, 17 or 18 cm), with 8 in (20 cm) depths also available. Typically uses coiled metal snare wires.

- Piccolo snare

The piccolo snare is a type of snare used by drummers seeking a higher-pitched sound from their snare. Because the piccolo snare has a narrower depth than that of the marching snare or set snare, a higher-pitched "pop" is more widely associated with it. Although the piccolo snare has a more distinctive, unique sound, it has some downsides. Because of the "sharper" sound of the piccolo, its sound travels further and is picked up by microphones further away during recording, making it difficult to record effectively. There are many kinds of piccolo snare which can be piccolos, including the popcorn, soprano and standard snares. Popcorn snares typically have a diameter of 10 in (25 cm), sopranos 12–13 in (30–33 cm), and standard piccolos 14 in (36 cm). A well-known user of the piccolo snare was Neil Peart, the drummer of Rush, who used a 13 in (33 cm) X Shell Series Piccolo.

- Orchestral snare

Orchestral snare drums usually conform to the dimensions of drum kit snares, but often have a calf skin head or a synthetic approximation of a natural head material. They also typically use snares made of metal cable, gut, synthetic cord, or nylon, with some orchestral snare strainers supporting 3 different materials simultaneously and the ability to tune each bundle of snare material independently.

- Tabor

The tabor snare dates back to around the 14th century, and was used for marching beats in wars. It is a double-headed drum with a single snare strand, and was often played along with the three-holed pipe flute. The dimensions vary with the different types of tabor. It is typically 4 1/2 in (11 cm) wide and around 11–13 in (28–33 cm) in diameter.

- Tarol

The tarol snare has similar dimensions to the kit snare. The major distinction is that the snares in this type are on the top head rather than the bottom one.

- Caixa malacacheta

"Caixa" meaning "box". This is a simple 12 or 14 in (30 or 36 cm) diameter, 8 in (20 cm) deep snare typical of Samba played in Southern Brasil. Made from aluminum or steel with the snare wires on top, it can be played from a sling or "em cima" – on the shoulder to project the sound.

== Famous solo works ==
- "Three Dances for Solo Snare Drum" by Warren Benson
- "Trommel Suite" by Siegfried Fink
- "American Suite for Solo Snare Drum" by Guy Gauthreaux II
- "Prím" by Áskell Másson
- "March-Cadenza" by Gert Mortensen
- "Douze Études pour Caisse Claire" by Jacques Delécluse

== Famous orchestral repertoire ==
- Lieutenant Kije by Sergei Prokofiev
- Scheherazade by Rimsky-Korsakov
- "The Stars and Stripes Forever" by John Philip Sousa
- Polovetsian Dances by Alexander Borodin
- Carl Nielsen's Fifth Symphony
- Ionisation by Edgard Varese
- Bolero by Maurice Ravel
- Dmitri Shostakovich's Seventh Symphony, "Leningrad" and Eleventh Symphony, "The Year 1905"
- Béla Bartók's Concerto for Orchestra
- "Mars, the Bringer of War" by Gustav Holst

== Popular brands ==
- Brady Drum Company
- DW
- Fibes
- Gretsch
- Ludwig
- Mapex
- Pearl Drums
- Pork Pie Percussion
- Premier
- Remo
- Rogers
- Slingerland
- Sonor
- Tama
- Yamaha

== See also ==
- Snare drum hardware
- Double-drumming
- St. Anger by Metallica

== Sources ==
- Beck, John (1995). Encyclopedia of percussion instruments. New York: Garland Publishing. ISBN 0-8240-4788-5. Google Books preview. Accessed 8 September 2009.
