= Fred Sanford (musician) =

American drummer

Fred Sanford (1947–2000) was a percussionist, teacher, composer, and clinician. He is best known for his work in the areas of marching percussion, drum & bugle corps, and marching band.

Raised in Casper, Wyoming, Fred followed his older brother Ken, also a drummer, into the Casper Troopers Drum & Bugle Corps at the age of 12 in 1959. He was a member of the Troopers for ten years until he aged out following his 21st birthday in 1968. Although he attended school at California State University in Fullerton and taught the newly organized Anaheim Kingsmen from 1965 to 1967, each summer he would return to teach and perform with his hometown corps.

In 1968, Fred moved to northern California where he attended San Jose State University and studied percussion with Tony Cirone. During this time he also began to instruct and write for another new drum corps – the Santa Clara Vanguard, with whom he would work for 12 seasons. During his tenure there, the Vanguard drumline won an unprecedented five national DCI "high drums" titles; years 1973, 1974, 1975, 1978, and 1979.

Following his graduation from San Jose State in 1970, he taught high school music programs in Bergenfield, New Jersey where he met Dennis DeLucia. "Fred Sanford made his mark on the world of percussion with his extraordinary arrangements for the Santa Clara Vanguard," recalls DeLucia. "For the first time in drum corps, percussion charts were magnificent orchestrations that beautifully captured the style and elegance of the music and made the horn line sound much better than it would have sounded by itself! My personal favorite – "Young Person's Guide to the Orchestra" (1974) – was a landmark in voicing, rhythmic interest and accompaniment that featured the drumline in the most musical way imaginable."

The '70s also saw Fred begin his association with the Slingerland Drum Company where he was instrumental in designing the TDR snare, Cut-a-way tenor drums, Tonal bass drums and fiberglass vest/harnesses to carry marching percussion. He also began another important aspect of his career, teaching educational clinics on marching percussion around the country and eventually around the world. During that decade, Sanford also worked with the Madison Scouts, the Alberta All-Girls Drum & Bugle Band, and The Blue Devils.

During the early 1980s, Sanford joined the Ludwig Drum Company as a Product Development Manager and Staff Clinician. In addition to his drum & bugle corps experiences, Sanford was the percussion coordinator for the 1984 Olympic Games in Los Angeles and also worked with the McDonald's All-American Band at various national parades.

Since 1985, he served as a marching percussion consultant for the Yamaha Corporation of America and developed the SFZ marching snare drum and the Power Lite Marching Series. Fred developed the Yamaha Sounds of Summer band camps which each summer attracted over 10,000 students who studied under Fred's direction.

Fred Sanford was also active in the Percussive Arts Society, serving on the PAS Marching Percussion Committee as well as being the "voice" of the Marching Percussion Festival for almost two decades. Sanford is a member of the DCI Hall of Fame. He died in 2000.

The Percussion Championship trophy at the Drum Corps International World Championships is named in his honor.
