= Drum stroke =

Movement which produces a single or multiple notes on drums

Ghost note drumming features various drum strokes including accented, sixteenth-note subdivision, closed hi-hat, and ghost notes.

In music, a drum stroke is a movement which produces a single or multiple notes on drums or other percussion instruments such as cymbals. There are several types of strokes: five basic single strokes (noted below), double strokes, and other multiple strokes such as triples, quadruples, or buzzes of indeterminate number.

== Basic strokes ==
The basic strokes produce a single hit or notes while resulting in different sounds. They are produced by different movements. While the basic strokes are fundamental sequences, the basic strokes are composed of three positions: up position (maximum height of the wrist), the tap position (minimum height of the wrist), and the rest position (when the wrist is still). Each of the basic strokes are a combination of the three positions.

- The full stroke begins with the tip of the drumstick up or held near vertically above the striking surface. The drummer strikes the drum and then returns the stick back up to its original position.
- The down stroke begins with the tip up, but upon striking the drum head, the drummer keeps the stick low (about an inch above the striking surface).
- The up stroke begins with the tip of the stick hovering low above the head of the drum. The drummer strikes the surface and brings the stick up, or to full stroke position.
- In the tap, the stick begins low and remains low after striking.
- The buzz stroke starts at a specified position; then, the stick travels towards the drum. As the stick hits the drum, the wrist and elbow press the stick into the drum, causing the stick to bounce multiple times creating a buzzing sound. After a specified length of time or number of bounces, the stick is returned to rest position.

The five basic strokes are used to produce a variety of accented and unaccented beat combinations.

== Other strokes ==
- Push/Pull or Push-Pull Strokes: dual fulcrum strokes with alternated wrist and finger motions.
- Moeller Method Strokes: the same 4 basic strokes as above, but with a dual fulcrum whipping motion.
- Gladstone Free Strokes: with a completely uninhibited rebound in full, half, or low varieties.
- Freehand or Gravity Strokes: a dual fulcrum stroke using the rim for alternating up and down halves.
- Ghost Notes: basic taps or up strokes played at a lower volume than the surrounding notes, the inverse of an accent.

== See also ==
- Drum rudiment
- Ghost note
- Beat (music)
- Backbeat
