= Samuel Potter (drum major) =

- Born: 1772; England
- Died: 1838, age 66
- Occupations: British Soldier, drum major, musician, author, instrument maker
- Writing career
- Period: 1786-1838

Samuel L. Potter (1772–1838) was a British drum major in the Band of the Coldstream Guards and an influential fife and drum manual author.

== Biography ==
Potter was born in 1772 and in 1786, at the age of 14, he enlisted in the Coldstream Regiment of Foot Guards. In 1800 he published a set of slow marches, waltzes and quicksteps. By 1815, Potter had ascended to the rank of Head Regimental Drum Major. During his service he was unhappy with the training and quality of the musical recruits coming into the regiment. He took it upon himself to write bugle, fife, and drum manuals to train his musicians. In 1817 he published three books: The Art of Beating the Drum; The Art of Playing the Fife and The Bugle Horn Major's Companion. His drum manual was especially influential in both Britain and America, with its legacy easily identified in such works as Walter F. Smith's 1897 manual Instructions for Trumpet and Drum and V.F. Safranek's 1916 publication Complete Instruction Manual for Bugle, Trumpet, and Drum, which both feature drum rudiments and calls that are obviously taken from Potter's work. Potter set up an instrument-making shop in King Street, Westminster in 1810 where he made horns, bugles, drums, trumpets, and fifes for military use under his son Henry's (b. 1810) name. Military rules prevented him from establishing his own company. He resigned from the Guards in 1817 after 30 years of service to run his business. Henry followed his father into the instrument making business and became a well-known flute-maker and owner of Henry Potter & Co. Ltd with his brother William. Samuel's third son George opened his own military instrument making shop and founded the company George Potter & Co., which bought his brothers' business in 1918 and continues to produce instruments in Aldershot under the Henry Potter name.

== Publications ==
- A Sett of New Slow Marches, Waltzes, and Quicksteps for Fifes and Bugle Horns etc.
- Method for Playing the Fife
- The Art of Beating the Drum
- The Art of Playing the Fife
- The Bugle Horn Major's Companion
