= Moeller method =

Percussive stroke method

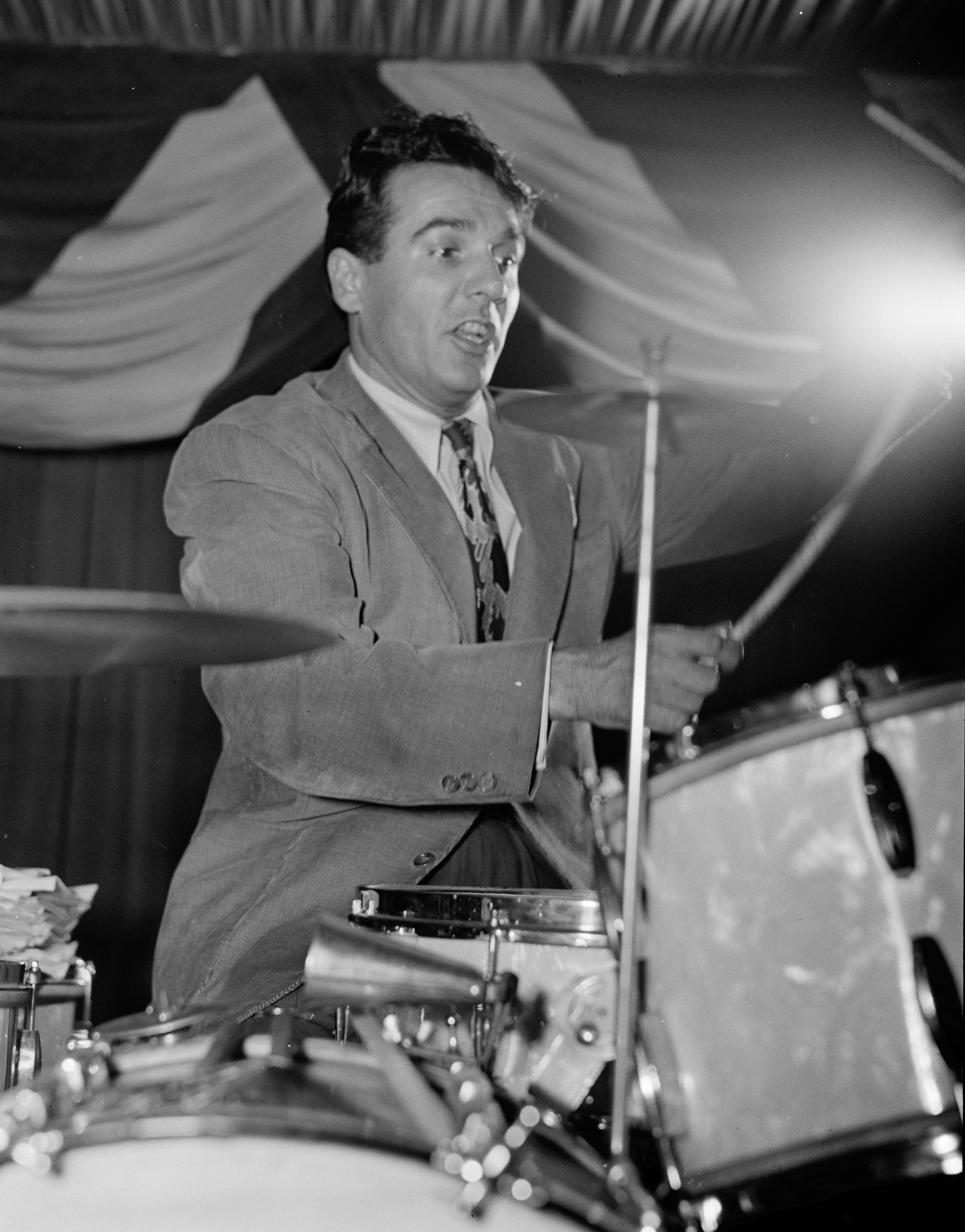

The Moeller method, Moeller technique or whipping technique is a percussive stroke method for drumming that combines a variety of techniques with the goal of improving hand speed, power, and control while offering the flexibility to add accented notes at will.

It is named for drummer Sanford A. Moeller, as described in his book The Art of Snare Drumming, also called The Moeller Book. It is believed that he described the method after observing drummers who had fought in the Civil War in the 19th century. Moeller was impressed at their ability to play at high volumes for long periods without tiring. He later taught the system to Jim Chapin in 1938 and 1939. Chapin worked to popularize this method until his death in 2009.

== Whipping motion ==
The technique uses a specific "whipping motion", also sometimes referred to as a "wave motion," for the right hand (or both hands in matched grip) and a motion described as flicking water off the finger tips for the left hand of traditional grip, that uses gravity and a dual-fulcrum motion to do the work, allowing the drummer to play faster, and louder, by staying relaxed. It has been promoted as requiring significantly less effort and carrying less risk of injury than other methods.

Chapin asserts in his video that the technique does not rely on the rebound—that the drummer must master the hand motion while playing each note as an actual stroke, while Dave Weckl in another video says that it does rely on the rebound.

== Strokes ==
The Moeller Method uses the whipping motion, described above, and applies it to the 4 basic strokes of drumming, the Full, Up, Down, and Tap strokes. Using a combination of the basic strokes, in the whipping Moeller style it is possible to play extremely quickly with minimal effort, or to introduce a series of accents into a stream of notes with relative ease. Moeller strokes are often grouped into doubles, using alternating Up and Down strokes, and triples, using Down, Tap, and Up strokes in succession. In practice, any combination of strokes can be used to play any rhythm or accent pattern needed.

== Grips ==
The Moeller book discusses two different right hand grips for traditional grip: the little finger or vintage grip, and the modern thumb fulcrum grip. The pinky fulcrum is pictured on page 4 of his book. His two-grip concept, missed and overlooked by many, was pointed out by Moeller advocate Tommy William Hanson, in a 2004 online article reviewing Moeller's book.

Gripping the right drumstick with the little finger was normally associated with "ancient style" drumming, aka a pre-1920s grip style that was normally taught to military drummers going back to the American Revolution. The "vintage" grip consisted of pressing or gripping the drumstick predominantly with the little finger. The other fingers would then be curled gently around the drumstick without pressing tightly. With this approach, the fulcrum is situated at the back of the hand. This allows for less vibration to be imparted to the hand during a loud stroke.

In contrast, the thumb fulcrum right hand grip (the second recognized grip in The Moeller Book) works better for a jazz drum set, rendering closed rolls and playing cymbal rhythms that require a more delicate touch.

The left hand grip that Moeller advocates is an open, loose grip. This contrasts with the "band and orchestra" grip popular in his era, which was closed and stiff. It is also entirely different, and more relaxed than the Alan Dawson "thumb back" grip and less thumb-centered than the Scottish "thumb on top" grip.
