= Percussive Arts Society =

US-based non-profit organization

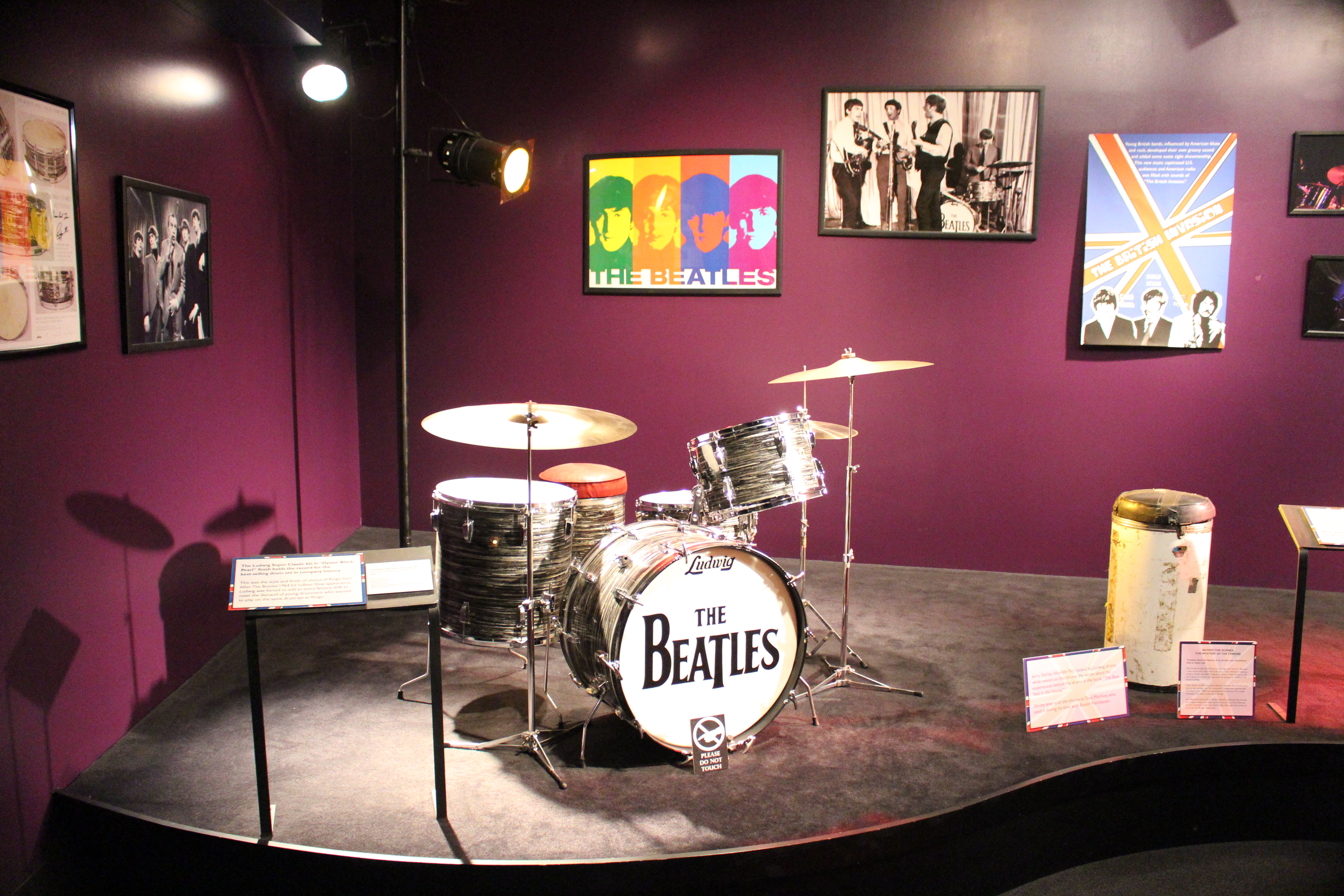
The Ludwig kit used by Beatles drummer Ringo Starr on display at the Rhythm! Discovery Center

The Percussive Arts Society (PAS) is a non-profit organization for professional percussionists and percussion educators. It was founded in 1961 in the United States and has over 5,000 members in 40 American chapters, with another 28 chapters abroad. It is headquartered in Indianapolis, Indiana. Since 1976, the organization hosts the annual Percussive Arts Society International Convention (PASIC) which is the largest convention for drummers and percussionists in the world.

PAS developed an influential list of drum rudiments called the PAS 40 International Snare Drum Rudiments, which are considered to be the current standard reference on the subject.

The Percussive Arts Society publishes Percussive Notes, a bimonthly professional journal started in 1963, and previously published the magazine Rhythm! Scene from 2014 until it became the official blog of the organization starting in 2020. It also previously published Percussionist (later renamed Percussive Notes Research Edition) until its functions were combined with Percussive Notes.

== Rhythm! Discovery Center ==
The Percussive Arts Society owns and manages the Rhythm! Discovery Center at its downtown Indianapolis headquarters. Opened in 2009, the 15,000-square-foot (1,400 m^{2}) museum houses an 800-piece collection, with rotating exhibits and interactive programming.

== See also ==
- List of music museums
- List of attractions and events in Indianapolis
