= J. Burns Moore =

American musician

Joseph Burns Moore
- Born: 1872
- Origin: Nova Scotia
- Died: 1951; Connecticut
- Genres: rudimental drumming, classical
- Occupation(s): Connecticut National Guardsman, Orchestra Musician, drum teacher, drum corps instructor
- Instrument(s): snare drum, timpani
- Years active: 1888–1951

Joseph Burns Moore (1872–1951) was a champion rudimental snare drummer, member of the Connecticut National Guard, instructional author, and founding member of the National Association of Rudimental Drummers.

== Career ==
J. Burns Moore was born in 1872 in North Sydney, Nova Scotia, Canada. His family moved to New Haven, Connecticut in 1888 when he was sixteen years old, and he studied drums with Jack Lynehan. He played in his first snare drumming competition while a sergeant in the New Haven Grays. Moore also played in the Morris Drum Corps during the 1890s. He would go on to win the Connecticut Championship in 1891, 1895, 1897, and 1900. He also placed 3rd in 1893, which outraged him. He took out an ad in the paper challenging the 1st and 2nd-place finishers to a drum-off. In 1905 Moore joined the New Haven Symphony Orchestra as a percussionist, a post he held for over 45 years. He was also a drummer in the 2nd Company of the Governor's Foot Guards.

In 1933 Moore was invited to be a judge at the American Legion National Convention in Chicago. While at the convention he participated in the formation of the National Association of Rudimental Drummers with William F. Ludwig, Sr., George Lawrence Stone, and 10 other prominent rudimental drummers that eventually organized the 26 Standard American Drum rudiments. Moore served as the first president of the new organization from 1933 to 1945.

In the 1930s Moore was known as a tough teacher, reportedly throwing out students who had not practiced and using profanity around them during lessons, which cost 25 cents per half hour. According to the CPI Inflation Calculator, this would have been equivalent to about $5 in 2019, extremely inexpensive by today's standards.

Moore had a strong relationship with William F. Ludwig and the W.F.L. Drum Company published his rudimental drum book Art of Drumming in 1937, which includes 27 rudiments despite his involvement with the selection of the Standard 26, and produced a signature model marching snare drum for him. The company also ran an ad in 1941 calling Moore the "World's Greatest Drummer" and touting his 54 years of experience at the time. Moore and Ludwig judged a NARD and Ludwig Drums sponsored competition together in 1940 called "East Meets West" where drummers from different regions of the USA competed.

Moore recorded the drum solos "Connecticut Halftime" and "Old Dan Tucker" in 1940 for the WFL Drums album Wm. F. Ludwig Rudimental Drum Album No. 1. "Connecticut Halftime" would later be re-released on an album called Ruffles and flourishes : music for field trumpets and drums in 1957.

Among Moore's students was Hanaford Fife and Drum Corps founder Gerd Sommer, noted rudimental teacher Carl Frolich, champion snare drummer Frank Fancher, noted teacher, drum shop owner, and contributor to Modern Drummer and Downbeat magazines Jimmie Stavris, and champion snare drummer (and namesake of the Dan English Trophy) Daniel English.

In 2013, Moore was awarded the USARD Lifetime Achievement Award.
