= Edward B. Straight =

American musician

- Occupations: Drummer, Author, Drum Teacher, Military
- Writing career
- Language: English
- Years active: 1908-1951
- Genre: Drum Instruction

Edward B. Straight was an American drummer, founding member of the National Association of Rudimental Drummers, and author of several instructional drum books in the early days of drum kit playing.

== Career ==
Straight was known to be a theater drummer in Chicago as well as an author, Sergeant in the US military, and a staff instructor at the Ludwig Drums company. He was a proponent of natural sticking on the drum set, as opposed to alternate sticking or purely rudimental sticking. His first publication was Edward B. Straight's The American drummer in 1908, which would be reissued in several further editions. He followed this in 1922 with Edward B. Straight system of modern drumming : the easiest and most natural way to play drums : ragtime jazz and syncopation. In 1923 he published his Analysis 6/8 Time and his Lesson File. At the American Legion National Convention in 1933, Straight helped to found the National Association of Rudimental Drummers with 12 other notable drummers, including William F. Ludwig, Sr. and George Lawrence Stone. In 1934 he published a solo called Etude No. 1: drum solo and in 1936 he released his Drum Corps Method. In 1951 he contributed drum tracks to the Ludwig recording The thirteen essential drum rudiments; Nine drums solos.

Straight's students included Percussive Arts Society Hall of Fame members John P. Noonan and Gene Krupa.

== Publications ==
- Edward B. Straight's The American drummer
- American School of Double Drumming
- Straight's Modern Syncopated Rhythms for Drums
- Edward B. Straight system of modern drumming : the easiest and most natural way to play drums : ragtime jazz and syncopation
- Edward B. Straight system of modern drumming : the easiest and most natural way to play drums : Lesson File
- The Straight system, a modern method : the "natural way" to play drums : analysis 6/8 time
- Edward B. Straight's drum corps method : the natural way to play
- Etude No. 1: drum solo
- The thirteen essential drum rudiments; Nine drums solos. (LP)
