= Slingerland Drum Company =

US drum manufacturing company

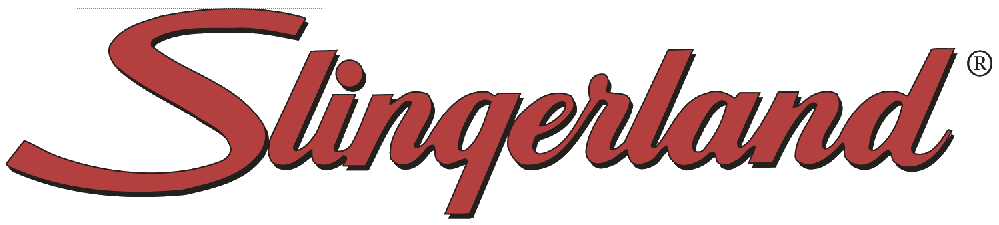
- Formerly: Slingerland Banjo Company
- Type: Privately held company (1913–late 1970s); Brand (late 1970s–present)
- Industry: Musical instruments
- Founded: 1913; 113 years ago in Kalamazoo, Michigan, USA
- Founder: Henry Heanon Slingerland
- Headquarters: Oxnard, California, United States
- Area served: Worldwide
- Products: Drum kits, electric & acoustic guitars, violins, mandolins, banjos, ukuleles
- Owner: Drum Workshop

Slingerland is a United States manufacturer of drums and formerly bugles. The company was founded in 1912 and enjoyed several decades of prominence in the industry before the 1980s. After ceasing operation in the early 1980s, Slingerland was acquired by Gibson, who briefly revived it and owned it until November 2019, before selling Slingerland to DW Drums, who announced the intention of re-launching the brand. Slingerland is strongly associated with jazz drummers, such as Gene Krupa and Buddy Rich, who played signature instruments made by the company. Although primarily known for its drums, in the 1930s Slingerland also produced electric and acoustic guitars, violins, mandolins, banjos and ukuleles.

== History ==
The "Slingerland Banjo Company" was founded by Henry Heanon (H.H.) Slingerland (1875–1946) in 1912. Slingerland had won a correspondence school of music in a card game aboard one of the gaming boats that once cruised Lake Michigan. He then opened a music school in Chicago, and soon turned to manufacturing musical instruments as well. As its name indicated, the company started out producing banjos while importing ukuleles from Germany, but set up its own production because it could not meet demand. they next produced guitars (including electric guitars from 1936 or earlier). Manufacture of snare drums was started in 1926 in answer to the entry of the American Ludwig & Ludwig drum company into the banjo market.

A resourceful and energetic businessman, H.H. established an extensive dealer network throughout the U.S., the then-territory of Hawaii (in the early 1930s) and China. After H.H.'s death from a stroke, the company was run by his wife, Nona, and one of their children, Henry Jr. The company's manufacturing plant was later moved from Chicago proper to Niles, a suburb in Cook County, Illinois.

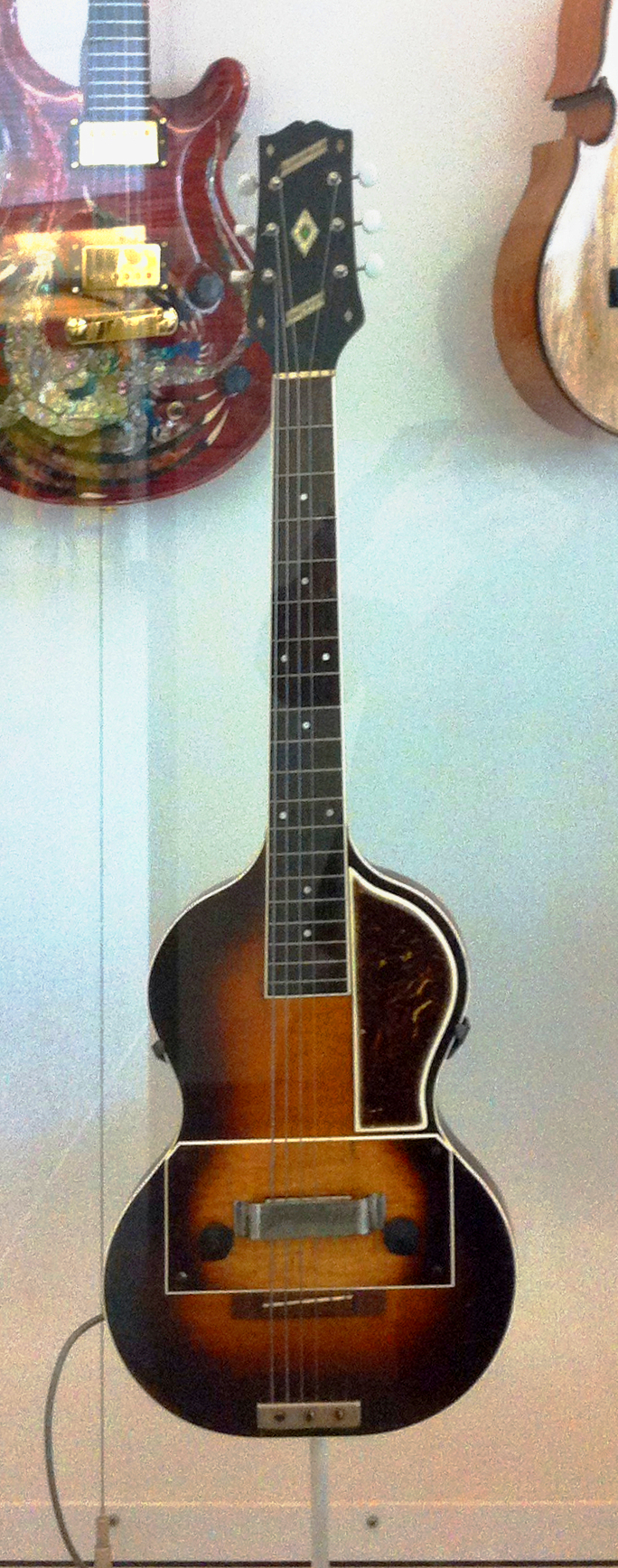
Slingerland Songster electric guitar (1936-39)

Although the Slingerland company was best known as a drum kit manufacturer, it also made guitars in the 1930s. The Songster electric guitar, featured in a 1939 company catalog, pre-dates Les Paul's "log" guitar and is probably the earliest Spanish-style solid-body electric guitar model. The guitar's pickup includes individual string magnets as well as a large horseshoe magnet. Slingerland ceased making electric instruments in 1940 in order to exclusively focus on producing percussion instruments.

Slingerland began producing bugles in the mid‑1930s, after expanding beyond drums into school and military band instruments. Their bugles were marketed heavily from the late 1930s through the 1950s, under the Slingerland Band Instruments division, and were widely used by Boy Scouts, drum & bugle corps, and parade units.

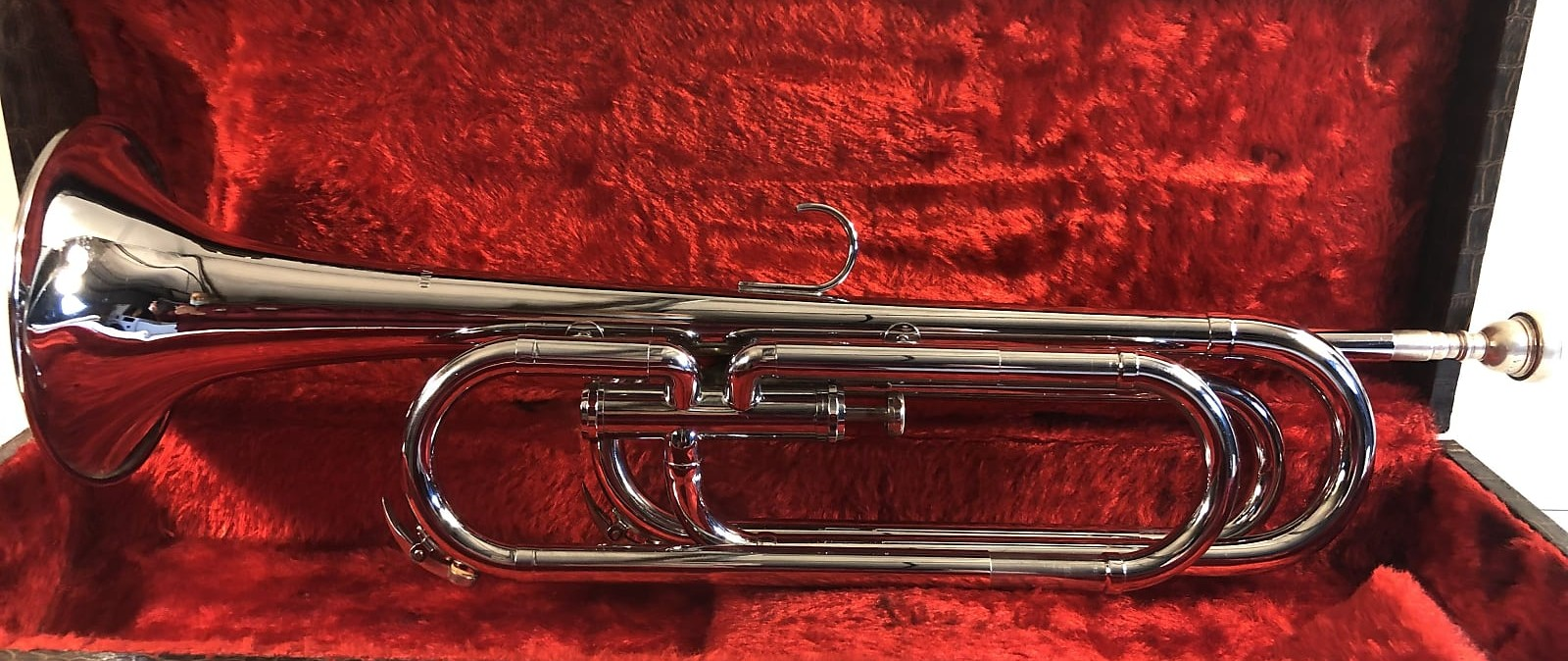
Slingerland Howard Knobel Model One Valve Bugle

Slingerland bugle production began mid‑1930s under the Band Instruments division, peaked in the 1940s–50s with regulation G bugles for scouts and corps, and declined by the 1960s as the company refocused on drums.

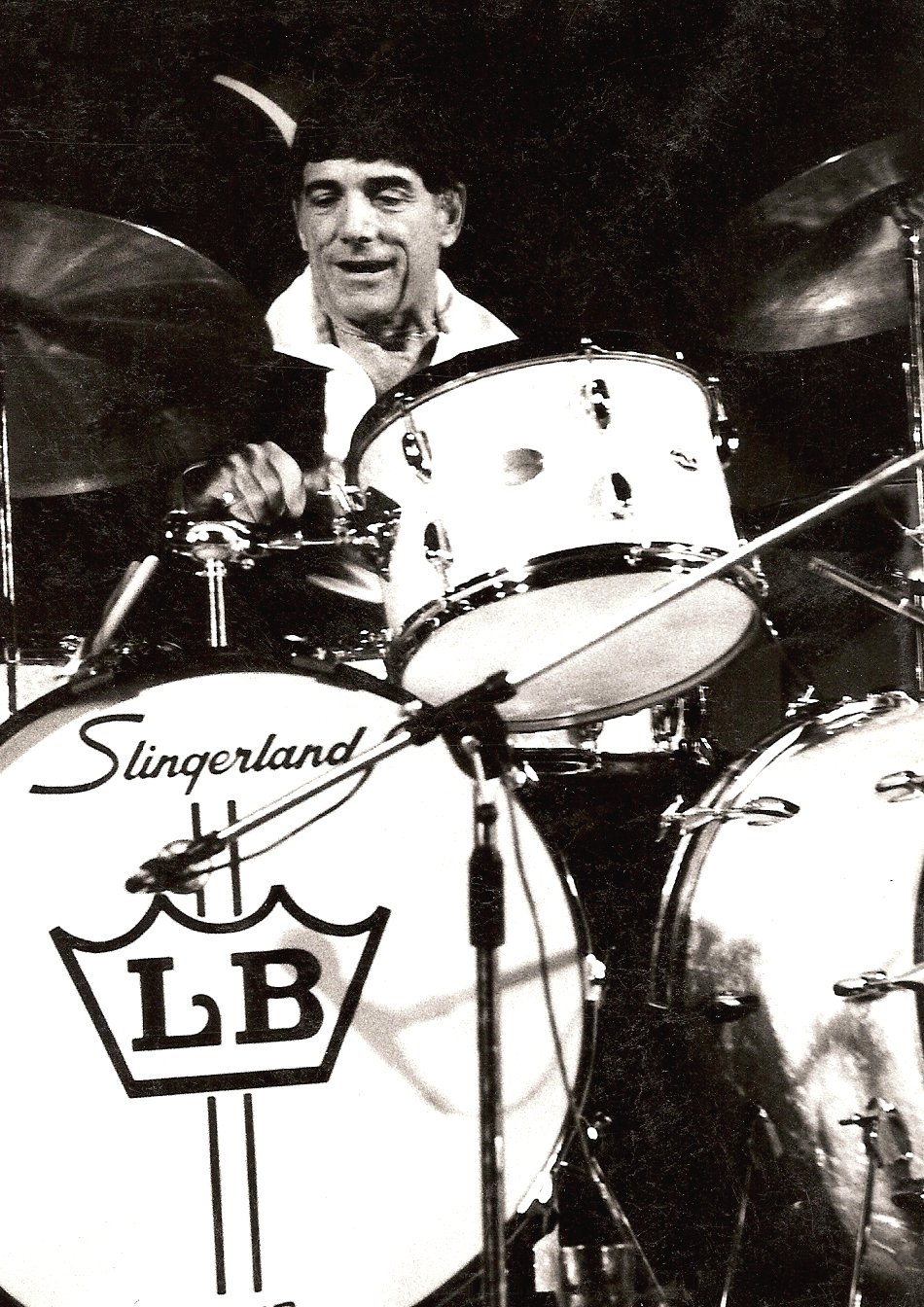
Louie Bellson playing his Slingerland kit in 1980

The company remained in the Slingerland family until 1970, but continued to be a prominent drum manufacturer throughout the 1970s. After introducing the Magnum series in 1982, Slingerland lost its footing, and the company folded in 1986. Slingerland changed ownership multiple times until it was acquired from Gretsch (part of the Gibson Guitar Corporation by then) in 1994. Gibson revived the brand, but had limited success, due to premium pricing and poor economic conditions.

In 1998, Slingerland released a model based on its Gene Krupa signature drum kit.

In 2018, much if not all of the remaining warehouse stock of Slingerland drums, including bare shells, hardware and complete drum sets, were sold as a result of Gibson's bankruptcy auction to a private individual who proceeded to liquidate the remaining stock via eBay. This included drums produced in Nashville and in Taiwan.

On November 25, 2019, it was announced that DW Drums had taken over ownership of the Slingerland brand from Gibson. At the January 2025 NAMM show, the revamped Slingerland premiered a pair of limited Radio King replica snare drums (14"x5" and 14"x7,) both handcrafted in Oxnard, California.

== Products ==
=== Radio King ===
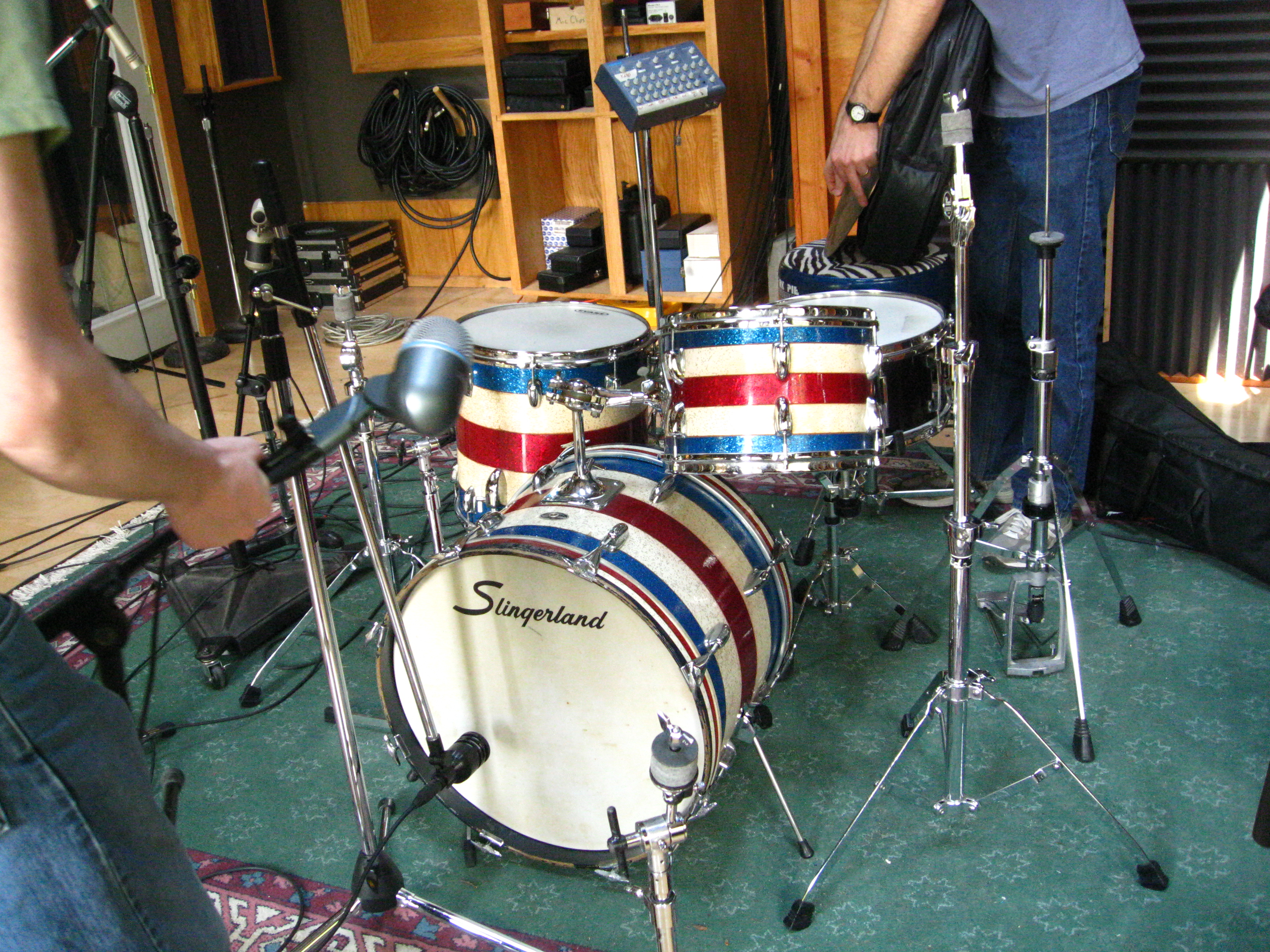
A Slingerland drum kit

Slingerland's most famous product line is the Radio King series of drums. These drums were introduced in 1936–37, and remained Slingerland's flagship snare drums and drum sets until 1957, when the Radio King model briefly disappeared from the product line. Between 1960 and 1962, Radio Kings were reintroduced. Older Radio Kings are obsessively collected by vintage drum enthusiasts. Gene Krupa and Buddy Rich were both Radio King endorsers.

The original Radio King snare drum is distinguished by its construction: rather than several plies of mahogany, like most snare drums of the era, a Radio King drum was created from a single piece of steam-bent maple with solid maple reinforcement rings to assist in keeping the drum round under the pressure of the metal hardware attached to it. Single-ply wood drums are known for their resonance and bright tone.

Radio King bass drums and tom-toms were made from mahogany, with maple reinforcement hoops. These drums are known for their "thuddy" sound; very warm, with quick decay.

The popularity of the old Slingerland Radio King snare drum is evidenced by myriad professional drummers who still used the snare in 2017, despite endorsing other brands.

=== Rolling Bomber ===
A departure from the standard Slingerland product line occurred during World War II when wood was used to manufacture drum parts that had traditionally been made of brass, chrome, nickel, and steel. This was due to the high demand for metals needed for the war effort. These drums were named the "Rolling Bomber" series, and are highly collectible.

=== Rock and Roll ===
The Rock and Roll era of the 1960s and 1970s was a good time for many American drum companies, including Slingerland, although its main competitor, Ludwig, had the advantage of being endorsed by Ringo Starr, but Slingerland, too, produced drums in that era and had robust sales. Beside long time endorser Buddy Rich, Slingerland in the 1970s garnered drummers Danny Seraphine with Chicago and Nigel Olsson, the drummer for Elton John, and Neil Peart of Rush. Short-lived in the 1970s was Slingerland's version of Ludwig Vistalite drums. They stopped production quickly after their introduction due to a patent infringement suit and a cease and desist warrant from Ludwig regarding Slingerland's foray into acrylic drums. These drums today remain collectible.

=== Marching drums ===
Slingerland marching drums were produced as early as the 1920s. By the 1970s, the Slingerland line of marching equipment had become very popular in marching bands, colleges, and drum corps. During the late 1970s, Slingerland introduced its TDR marching snare drum, with a novel strainer and synthetic-gut snare that produced a distinctive sound. Another late-70s innovation was the Slingerland cutaway multi-tenors that were carried in trio, quad, or quint arrangements. The cutaway design was first used in 1977 by the Santa Clara Vanguard under drum captain Fred Sanford and the Oakland Crusaders under Tom Float. Famous drum corps such as the 27th Lancers Drum and Bugle Corps of Revere, Massachusetts under Charlie Poole, the Bridgemen of Bayonne, New Jersey under Dennis Delucia, the Chicago Cavaliers under Gus Barbaro and Brian Callahan, the Pittsburgh Royal Crusaders and the General Butler Vagabonds all used Slingerland equipment in the late 1970s and early 1980s. In the early 1980s, Slingerland was gaining significant market share, but the company was sold, and corporate finances fell apart. By the late 1980s, Slingerland had fallen behind technologically, and Ludwig-Musser, and especially Pearl drums, began to pick up its market share.

== Manufacturing ==
For most of the company's pre-1970s history, Slingerland's manufacturing processes were not standardized in the way that modern large-scale manufacturing companies' are. Exceptions to nearly every strict product taxonomy existed. This is due in large part to the fact that parts would often be left over from year to year and would be used by workers even though some of those parts had been officially discontinued from the line.

== Legacy ==
Jean-Paul Gaster of the American rock band Clutch uses Slingerland drums, and is described as one of the last drummers to play rock using "vintage weapons," besides Neil Hennessy of the punk rock band the Lawrence Arms.

Jamie Oliver, veteran drummer of English punk rock band UK Subs, frequently appears live with his vintage silver tone Slingerland. In addition, drummer Jean-Marc Butty uses vintage Slingerland Drums with PJ Harvey.

== Notable artists ==
- Artimus Pyle - Lynyrd Skynyrd
- Barrett Deems
- Bev Bevan - Electric Light Orchestra
- Bill Ward - Black Sabbath
- Bill Stevenson - Descendents, Black Flag
- Buddy Rich
- Bun E. Carlos - Cheap Trick
- Carmine Appice
- Chad Wackerman
- Danny Seraphine - Chicago
- Gene Krupa
- Irving Cottler
- Jay Bellerose
- Jean-Paul Gaster - Clutch
- Johnathan Norton - Eels
- Lee Kerslake - Uriah Heep
- Levon Helm - The Band
- Louie Bellson
- Neal Smith - Alice Cooper
- Neil Hennessy - The Lawrence Arms
- Neil Peart - Rush
- Nigel Olsson - Elton John
- Peter Erskine
- Phil Rudd - AC/DC
- Ray McKinley
- Remu Aaltonen
- Sigurður Steinar Reynisson - Drýsill
