= List of percussionists =

A percussionist is a musician who plays a percussion instrument. Although drummers and vibraphonists are considered percussionists, this list only includes percussionists known for playing a variety of percussion instruments. There is a separate list of drummers and list of vibraphonists. If a percussionist specializes in a particular instrument, it is listed in parentheses.

== A ==
- Keiko Abe (marimba)
- Alex Acuña
- Charlie Adams
- Marc Anderson
- José Areas
- Frank Arsenault
- Okyerema Asante

== B ==
- Lekan Babalola
- Manolo Badrena
- Ginger Baker
- Cyro Baptista
- Michael Alden Bayard
- John Bergamo
- Cindy Blackman Santana
- Richard Bona
- John Bonham
- Gary Burton

== C ==
- Cándido Camero
- Michael Carabello
- Pedro Carneiro (marimba)
- Christoph Caskel
- Lenny Castro
- Pius Cheung (marimba)
- Mino Cinélu
- Frank Colón
- Luis Conte
- Bob Conti
- Ray Cooper
- Mayuto Correa
- Shawn Crahan (Slipknot)
- Colin Currie

== D ==
- Paulinho da Costa
- Rubem Dantas
- Mike Dillon
- Debra Dobkin
- Josh Dun (Twenty One Pilots)

== E ==
- Coke Escovedo
- Pete Escovedo
- Peter Michael Escovedo
- Sheila Escovedo
- Tony Esposito

== F ==
- Jan Faulkner
- Chris Fehn (Slipknot)
- Victor Feldman
- Will Ferrell (Cowbell)
- Vic Firth
- Tristan Fry

== G ==
- Steve Gadd
- Guille Garcia
- Peter Giger
- Evelyn Glennie
- Martin Grubinger
- Trilok Gurtu

== H ==
- Jamey Haddad
- Bobbye Hall
- Lionel Hampton (vibraphone)
- Ralph Hardimon
- Mickey Hart (Drum)
- Giovanni Hidalgo (congas)
- Taku Hirano
- Marty Hurley
- Zakir Hussain

== J ==
- Alex Jacobowitz (xylophone)

== K ==
- Kalani
- Donald Knaack

== L ==
- Joe Lala
- Jody Linscott
- Pete Lockett

== M ==
- Ralph MacDonald
- Ed Mann
- Mitch Markovich
- Marilyn Mazur
- Othello Molineaux (steel drums)
- Moondog
- Airto Moreira
- Luigi Morleo
- Katarzyna Mycka

== N ==
- Andy Narell
- Hani Naser
- Max Neuhaus

== O ==
- Babatunde Olatunji
- Laudir de Oliveira

== P ==
- Morris Pert
- Morris Palter
- Neil Peart
- Lisa Pegher
- Richard Pelham
- Armando Peraza
- Mitchell Peters
- Joe Porcaro
- Chano Pozo
- Tito Puente

== Q ==
- Taufiq Qureshi
- Tim Quy

== R ==
- Layne Redmond
- Daniel de los Reyes
- Walfredo de los Reyes (also known as Walfredo de los Reyes Sr.)
- Walfredo Reyes Jr. (also known as Walfredo de los Reyes Jr.)
- Emil Richards
- Frank Ricotti
- John Bernard Riley
- Dom Um Romão

== S ==
- Bobby Sanabria
- Poncho Sanchez
- Mongo Santamaría
- Joe Saylor
- Steven Schick
- Rainer Seegers (timpani)
- Sheila E.
- Ramesh Shotham
- Rick Shutter
- Sivamani
- Stuart Saunders Smith
- Leigh Howard Stevens
- Latyr Sy

== T ==
- Crystal Taliefero
- Third Coast Percussion
- Cal Tjader
- Arto Tunçboyacıyan

== U ==
- Ruth Underwood (Frank Zappa) (Marimba)

== V ==
- David Van Tieghem
- Nana Vasconcelos
- Glen Velez
- Tommy Vig
- Paolo Vinaccia
- T. H. Vinayakram

== W ==
- Beibei Wang (1986 - ) Chinese multi-percussionist living in London
- Stokley Williams (1989–present) (Mint Condition)
- Melanie Woods

== Y ==
- Stomu Yamashta

== Z ==
- Yatta Zoe
