= John P. Noonan =

American musical percussionist, retailer and educator

Background information
- Born: September 28, 1904; Lincoln, Illinois
- Died: January 18, 1984 (aged 79) Normal, Illinois
- Occupations: Musician, music educator, musical instrument retailer
- Years active: 1920-1983
- Spouse: Ethel "Pi" Little

John Patrick Noonan (September 28, 1904 – January 18, 1984) was an American percussionist, music educator and musical instrument retailer. He wrote for several publications including DownBeat, Metronome, The Instrumentalist, The School Musician and The Ludwig Drummer. Over his career, he performed under several prominent conductors including John Philip Sousa, Edwin Franko Goldman, and William Revelli.

== Early life and education ==
Noonan was born on September 28, 1904, in Lincoln, Illinois, a son of Thomas E. and Birdie Murray Noonan. In 1922 he graduated from Holy Trinity High School in Bloomington and Illinois Wesleyan University College of Law in 1927 with a Bachelor of Laws degree.

Noonan began playing the drums at age 14. His father, a trumpet player, led the family's mini-orchestra. "One sister played the fiddle, another the piano. We didn't have a drummer, so I became the drummer...I hit the thing once and I was hooked." At first he taught himself to play the drums but later found a teacher, Edward B. Straight. He studied snare drum with Max Nickell of the San Francisco Symphony, tympani with Edward M. Metzinger of the Chicago Symphony Orchestra and all percussion instruments with Roy C. Knapp.

== Career ==
Early in his career Noonan scouted for work in California where he said he performed everywhere, "...from saloons to symphony halls", playing drums for silent movies in theaters, burlesque and Vaudeville houses. In the mid-1920s, he toured the United States with a dance band. Due to health issues he was unable to take positions with large symphonies. He returned to Illinois and in 1935 was an assistant supervisor of the Works Progress Administration (WPA) musical projects in the 4th district interviewing amateur and professional musicians who wished to participate in their Jobs and Income for the Unemployed Program during the Great Depression.

In 1943 Noonan opened a full-line band instrument retail store called the Noonan Music Company in downtown Bloomington. He also taught drums privately, coached local school percussion sections, and performed with the Bloomington-Normal Symphony Orchestra, the Bloomington Municipal Band and area dance bands.

Shortly before World War II, Noonan became a technical advisor and Educational Director for Ludwig & Ludwig Drum Company (later Leedy & Ludwig, and then the WFL Drum Company) in Chicago. While there Leopold Stokowski called on Noonan for advice leading to the creation of two special "outsized suspended tympani" sets by Ludwig, which Noonan delivered.

While at Ludwig, Noonan traveled throughout the United States giving perhaps the first drum clinics at high schools, universities and music schools to demonstrate the latest in percussion instruments and their performance techniques. Noonan joined Roy C. Knapp's School of Percussion in 1946 as a teacher and Vice President/Associate Director and became the first editor of the Percussion Clinic column for The Instrumentalist where he wrote percussion articles intermittently until 1960. In 1945 he joined the Illinois Wesleyan University music faculty (his Alma Mater - Bachelor of Laws degree, 1927) where he taught percussion until 1954.

In 1961, Noonan sold The Noonan Music Company while continuing to teach and sell drums and percussion instruments from his home studio and drum shop until he retired in 1973.

In October 1978, Noonan received two celebrated visitors to his home in Normal, Illinois, Roy C. Knapp and William F. Ludwig, Jr.:

== Awards, memberships and honors ==
Noonan was a charter member of the Percussive Arts Society (PAS) and inducted into their inaugural class Hall of Fame in 1972.

Noonan was a member of Phi Alpha Delta Legal Fraternity, the American Federation of Musicians Local 102, an honorary member of Phi Mu Alpha Sinfonia Professional Music Fraternity, and a long-standing member of the National Association of Rudimental Drummers (NARD).

Seven months before his death, on June 12, 1983, Noonan was the honored guest at a testimonial dinner held at IWU to acknowledge his contributions to percussion and percussionists.

== Publications and writings ==
- DownBeat:
  - "The Secrets of Chick Webb's Drumming Technique" (September 1938). Vol 5 No. 9, p. 23
  - "Lionel Hampton Tinkered With Xylophone - And a Vibe Artist Was Born" (November 1938). Vol. 5, No. 11, p. 25
- "The School Drummers' Manual" (1941) with Jow Berryman and Clark Hammitt, Ludwig & Ludwig
- Percussive Notes (Bimonthly academic journal published by the Percussive Arts Society):
  - "The Perfect Concert Snare Drum" (Fall, 1975). Vol. 14., No. 1, p. 40
  - "Once Upon A Time" (Spring/Summer 1976). Vol. 14, No. 3, p. 43
- The Ludwig Drummer:
  - "12 Basic Swing Beats" (undated)
  - "Slants on the Modern Drummer" (Spring, 1948)
  - "The 'New' Drumstick Grip?" (Spring, 1964)
  - "Yesterday, Today and Tomorrow" (Fall 1965)

== Personal life and death ==
Noonan married Ethel "Pi" Little of Oakland, California, in May 1945. She preceded him in death on May 27, 1973. He died on January 18, 1984 at age 79, and was buried at Park Hill Cemetery in Bloomington, Illinois.
