= Frank Arsenault =

American percussionist, teacher

Background information
- Born: May 21, 1919; Chelsea, Massachusetts, United States
- Died: December 26, 1974 (aged 55)
- Genres: drum and bugle corps, marching band
- Occupations: clinician, teacher, competitor
- Instrument: percussion
- Years active: 1929 – 1974

Frank Arsenault (May 21, 1919 – December 26, 1974) was an internationally known American percussionist, teacher, and clinician in the areas of marching percussion, rudimental drumming, drum and bugle corps, and marching band. He was a full-time Staff Clinician and Educational Field Representative for the Ludwig Drum Company. He is also well known in his field for his signature playing style, for his many championship titles, and for his recording of The 26 Standard American Drum Rudiments and Selected Solos.

== Career ==
A recap of Frank Arsenault's formative years describes a progressive sequence of superior achievements.

— William F. Ludwig

Frank Arsenault played rudimental snare drum in the field of competitive drum and bugle marching corps in the 1950s. He was associated with the Skokie Indians and the Chicago Cavaliers, being credited with both groups having risen to national prominence. He was a member of the Lancraft Fife and Drum Corps in North Haven, Connecticut.

Arsenault retired from competition in the 1950s. He then became a full-time Staff Clinician and Educational Field Representative for the Ludwig Drum Company, traveling extensively. He was inducted into the Percussive Arts Society's Hall of Fame in 1975.

Frank Arsenault gained the title of National Rudimental Champion at the New York World's Fair in 1939 after winning the coveted National Solo Snare Drum Championship. Having defended his title numerous times, Mr Arsenault retired from solo competition undefeated to instruct others in the art of rudimental drumming.

=== The 26 Standard American Drum Rudiments and Selected Solos ===
The 26 Standard American Drum Rudiments and Selected Solos

Studio album by Frank Arsenault
- Released: 1958
- Recorded: 1950s
- Genre: instructional rudimental percussion
- Language: English
- Producer: Ludwig Drum Co.

These are the selected solos from the album:

- "Connecticut Halftime"
- "The Downfall of Paris"
- "Hell on the Wabash"
- "Old Dan Tucker"
- "The Three Camps"
- "Grandfather's Clock"
- "The General"

Frank Arsenault received longstanding celebration in his lifetime and beyond, by being featured prominently as the solo performer on the 1950s traditional recording titled The 26 Standard American Drum Rudiments and Selected Solos. The rudimental percussion community granted him a generally iconic status, in the forms of both his audio performance on the record, and in his portrait as a marching corps figure on its cover. A colorful illustration of this portrait would later be featured on the covers of the Rudimental Contest Series by Arsenault's eventual student, Mitch Markovich. As the rudiments became commonplace musical practice over the decades, the general rudimental notation was printed and distributed widely and usually free of charge by the National Association of Rudimental Drummers, sometimes featuring Arsenault's portrait.

Originally produced in the 1950s on vinyl record, the recording was updated with a 1982 cassette format and a 2003 compact disc format, each featuring the same contents as on the original vinyl. These albums are distributed with their own printed copies of the respective rudiments and solos. Audio samples are available online from the Lancraft Fife & Drum Corps.

In 1960, there was an unrelated publication done by Arsenault's fellow contemporary master educator, John S. Pratt, consisting of the sheet music of just the standard 26 rudiments.

=== Critical reception ===
A 1962 Ludwig Drummer Magazine article hailed, "The Frank Arsenault recording of The 26 Standard American Drum Rudiments has become the basic guide for building percussionists in school music programs across the nation." In 1975, William F. Ludwig called it, "the acknowledged 'Bible' of rudimental drumming" and added, "A recap of Frank Arsenault's formative years describes a progressive sequence of superior achievements."

Now, what have we done with our American NARD rudiments? Well, for one, I am very proud of the fact that we have the best drummers in the world—be it dance, concert or military. ... I could name many more of the famous percussionists who are rudimentally trained—such as Bobby Christian, his son Norman Christian, Frank Arsenault, Mitch Markovich, etc., etc.

— William F. Ludwig, Sr., then President of the National Association of Rudimental Drummers, The Importance of Drum Rudiments

He was a perfectionist. Frank Arsenault had big arm motion but was very fast—a very open style with high attacks. He was a human machine.

— Ken Mazur, The Perfectionists: The History of Rudimental Snare Drumming From Military Code to Field Competition

Though never translating the rudimental range with original architecture like John S. Pratt or Mitch Markovich Arsenault nonetheless chronicled the accessible 26 Standard with sharp procedure adaptability, creating proficiency criteria—benchmarks—for generations of drummers.

— FutureRhythms.com

I was fortunate to be in the audience for this special night [in 1968] at the Civic Opera House. The Glenview (Chicago), IL-based Drum Corps Digest magazine presented this showcase featuring 10 outstanding drum and bugle corps, along with two featured soloists—Mitch Markovich and Frank Arsenault.

— Steve Vickers, publisher, Drum Corps World newspaper

=== Teaching ===
Notable students of Arsenault have included the following:

- Mitch Markovich: internationally famed author of traditional standard percussion classics "Tornado", "Stamina", "Four Horsemen", and more. He is the only person to ever become three-time consecutive undefeated National Champion, and to become five-time consecutive undefeated Illinois State snare champion. Markovich briefly took lessons from Arsenault. Reaching many achievements and accolades similar to Arsenault's, Markovich likewise served in The Cavaliers Drum and Bugle Corps.

== Family ==
Frank Arsenault's late brother, Eldrick J. Arsenault (1923–2004), was also a skilled and respected percussionist, as a fellow member of the Lancraft Fife and Drum Corps.

== Death ==
Frank Arsenault died on December 26, 1974, due to a sudden heart attack. An obituary written by William F. Ludwig was sent to members of the National Association of Rudimental Drummers. Another obituary was written by the Percussive Arts Society.
