= Roy C. Knapp =

Musical artist and educator

- Born: October 26, 1891; Waterloo, Iowa
- Died: June 16, 1979 (aged 87) Chicago, Illinois
- Occupations: Musician, music educator
- Years active: 1905–1960
- Spouse: Betty

Roy Cecil Knapp (October 26, 1891 – June 16, 1979) was an American drummer and music educator. Known as "The Dean of American Drum Teachers", he founded the Roy C. Knapp School of Percussion in 1938. He was a longtime network orchestra member and sought-after studio musician skilled as a tympanist, percussionist and xylophone soloist. He performed on shows broadcast during radio's golden age in Chicago, Illinois, and was a founding member of the National Association of Rudimental Drummers (N.A.R.D.), which was formed in 1933.

== Early life and career ==
Born October 26, 1891 in Waterloo, Iowa, Knapp learned to play various instruments through his father Jerry who owned a theater. After working in New York for a year, he moved to Duluth, Minnesota, where he studied under Casey Kasolowsky of the Duluth Symphony, now the Duluth Superior Symphony Orchestra. He also studied under William Faetkenheuer of the Minneapolis Symphony. Knapp moved to Chicago in 1921 and became a sought-after drummer, percussionist, and xylophone soloist. Working for the WLS radio station starting in 1928, he played on shows such as the National Barn Dance and the Don McNeil's Breakfast Club. Knapp also taught percussion in various private studios and at the old Dixie Music House (est. 1902).

== Roy C. Knapp School of Percussion ==
In 1938 Knapp opened his own studio in Kimball Hall and, with the help of his wife, Betty, started one of the first schools of percussion in the United States. This school was a private affair, specializing in professional performance, but with no accreditation in the educational world.

In 1946, Knapp founded his second School of Percussion, but with the addition of piano, voice, composition, string and wind instruments receiving full accreditation to grant the bachelor's degree and the performer's certificate in voice, orchestral instruments and piano, including approval for veterans under the G.I. Bill the same year. He chose John P. Noonan, widely known percussionist, formerly Educational Director of the Ludwig & Ludwig Drum Company, as teacher and Vice President/Associate Director. Within a short time, Knapp had assembled a faculty of top people including twelve artist-percussionists hand-picked for their teaching skills. It was the first full-time percussion school, the first to require percussion ensemble participation, and the first to emphasize drum set study which at that time was not offered in any music school. At one point the school had 500 students with 22 teachers.

Knapp retired from performing in 1960 and closed his school in 1966. From then until his death he taught at Frank’s Drum Shop, owned by Maurie Lishon since 1959.

== Honors and death ==
In May 1966, The Dal Segno Musicians Club of Chicago honored Knapp with the Dal Segno Man of the Year award in recognition of his outstanding contributions as the teacher of more top-flight percussionists than any other person in the business. Knapp was inducted into the Percussive Arts Society's inaugural class Hall of Fame in 1972.

Knapp's friends, associates and students honored in September 1974 at the Roy C. Knapp Testimonial Day, "...for the full and talented life of Roy Knapp, his patient drawing-out of students' skills and his care to foster art above applause and honest creativity above quick dollars" and his original WLS drum set is on permanent display at the Percussive Arts Society's museum in Indianapolis, Indiana.

Knapp died in Chicago on June 16, 1979.

== Notable students ==
Knapp became widely recognized as a teacher. His roster of former students includes:

- Gene Krupa
- Louie Bellson
- Hal Blaine
- Dave Tough
- Sid Catlett
- John P. Noonan
- George Wettling
- Fred Below
- Abe Lyman
- Ben Pollack
- Bobby Rosengarden
- Red Saunders (musician)
- Odie Payne
- Buddy Harman
- Warren "Baby" Dodds
- Mousey Alexander
- Alan Abel
- Fred Anderson
- Elgin Evans
- Ray Bauduc
- Al Trace

== Publications ==
- The Fundamentals of Modern Drumming (1939). Stanger, Philip. Collection, Box 6, Folder 11, Special Collections Research Center, University of Chicago, Illinois.
- Fundamental Rudiments of Mallet Technique and Tympani Tuning Excerpt from Lesson Studies (1939) Ludwig & Ludwig (4-page brochure)
- The Grandaddy of Percussion with Young Ideas *The Ludwig Drummer (publ. by Ludwig Drums) (1968). Vol. 8, No. 1, pp. 18 - 20
