= National Association of Rudimental Drummers =

- Nickname: NARD
- Formation: June 20, 1932; 94 years ago
- Founded at: Chicago
- Dissolved: December 31, 1977; 48 years ago
- Legal status: active as of December 31, 2008; 17 years ago
- Purpose: promote the study of rudimental drumming
- Headquarters: Havertown, PA
- Leader: Mark Beecher

The National Association of Rudimental Drummers (N.A.R.D. or NARD) is an organization created to encourage the study of rudimental drumming. NARD is responsible for the creation of the Standard 26 American Rudiments.

== History ==
The National Association of Rudimental Drummers was formed at the American Legion National Convention of 1932. According to the official NARD website: "It is the purpose, aim and object of the N.A.R.D. to standardize drum rudiments and to encourage their adoption by all earnest students of drums; also to dispel the erroneous idea that the rudiments are only for the drum corps drummer." The founding members of NARD included William F. Ludwig, Sr., George Lawrence Stone, Harry Thompson, George A. Robertson, William M. Flowers, Heinie Gerlac, W.W. Kieffer, J. Burns Moore, W. F. Hammond, Joe A. Hathaway, Billy Miller, Edward B. Straight, and Roy C. Knapp. These original 13 members decided upon "The 13 Essential Rudiments," published in 1933, for American drumming in their first meeting. Potential members of NARD are expected to play the 13 essential rudiments in front of an existing NARD member in order to join the organization. William F. Ludwig said of that first meeting, "We talked and played the rudiments six hours well into the morning. But we felt that we had saved the drum rudiments by adopting a practical set of rudiments without deviation from any of the then recognized and established methods." Many of the founders had studied with Civil War veterans and felt that traditional rudimental drumming was becoming endangered. There was also a perceived discrepancy between the way that the rudiments were taught between the most popular rudimental books of the day, Bruce and Emmett's Guide and Gardiner A. Strube's Instructor. The chief concern with some of the rudiments was the placement of the accents, particularly on the double stroke roll.

NARD followed their "Essential 13" rudiments with "The 13 Rudiments to Complete the 26 Standard American Drum Rudiments" in 1936, after polling their 246 members to see which rudiment should be included. These two sheets of rudiments, totaling just 26, are the only American rudiments recognized by NARD. Despite this, founding member William Ludwig later included 30 rudiments in his book WFL Complete Drum Instructor in 1942. The 26 NARD rudiments correspond exactly the 25 Lessons found in Gardiner A. Strube's Drum and Fife Instructor of 1870 with the single addition of The Single Stroke Roll.

Frank Arsenault, president of NARD from 1954-1966 and eventual Percussive Arts Society Hall of Fame inductee, made a recording of the 26 NARD rudiments and selected solos from the NARD solo book in the 1950s.

NARD officially closed in 1977, though its rudiments continued to be the American standard until 1984 with the Percussive Arts Society's publication of the PAS 40 International Drum Rudiments. 31 years later, in 2008, NARD was reformed under president Mark Beecher, with the support of William F. Ludwig II and the Ludwig Drums Company.

== Publications ==
- The 13 Essential Rudiments
- The 13 Rudiments to Complete the 26 Standard American Drum Rudiments
- America's NARD Drum Solos (the green book)

== Past presidents ==
- J. Burns Moore 1933-1945
- George L. Stone 1945-1954
- Frank Arsenault 1954-1966
- William F. Ludwig 1966-1975
- Mitch Markovich 1976-1977
- Mark Beecher 2008 to present
