= Elizabeth Randles =

Welsh musician (1800–1829)

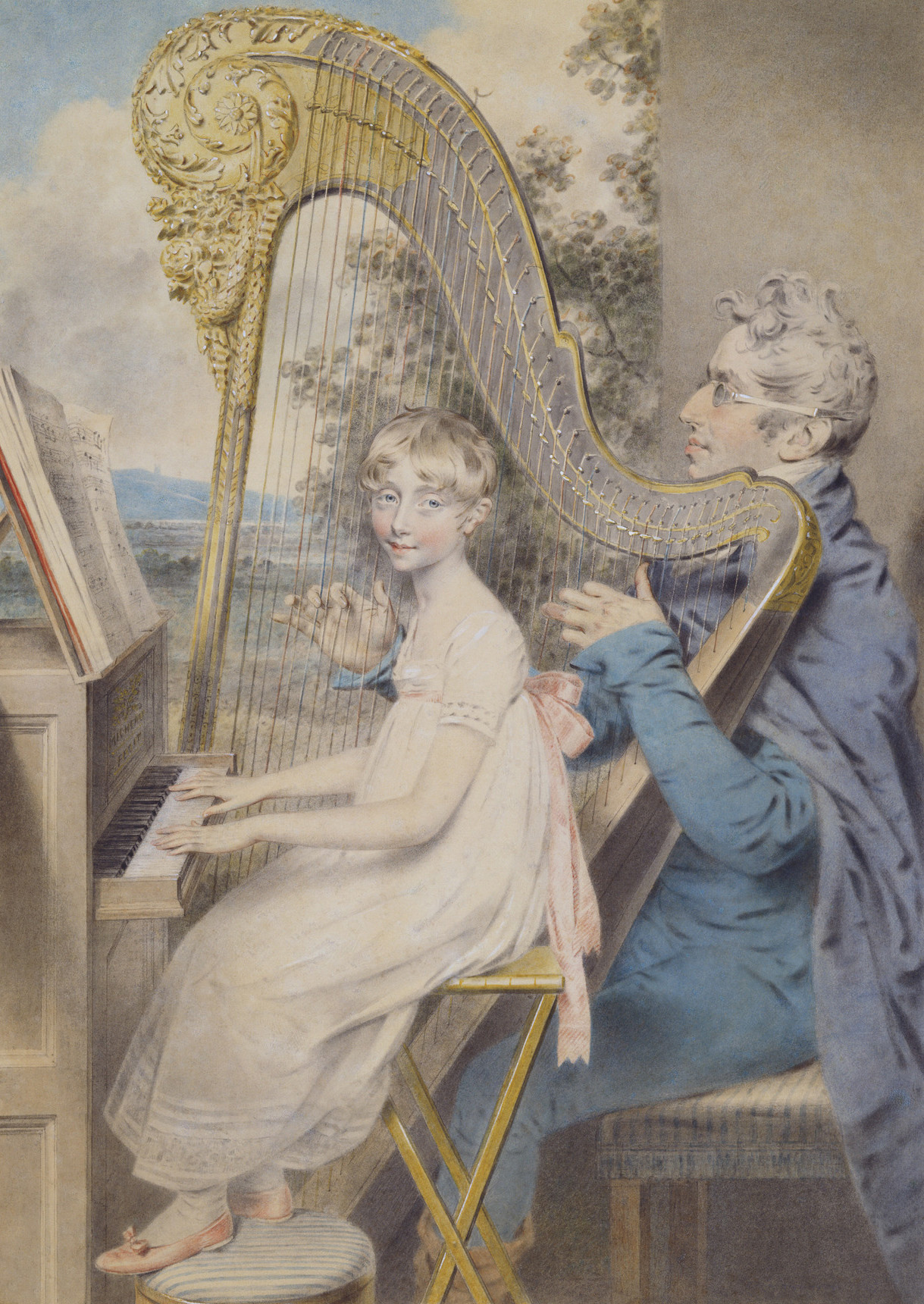
- John Downman portrait of Elizabeth and her father
- Born: 1 August 1800; Wrexham, Wales
- Died: 6 May 1829 (aged 28); Liverpool, England
- Occupations: Harpist; pianist

Elizabeth Randles (1 August 1800 – 6 May 1829), also known as "Little Cambrian Prodigy", was a Welsh harpist and pianist. A child prodigy, she started playing the piano at the age of sixteen months, and performed in public for the first time before she was two years old. Randles was taught by her blind father who was organist at the Holywell parish church. She performed for local aristocracy, leading to a performance for King George III and his royal family when she was three and a half. Caroline, Princess of Wales, hoped to adopt her but her father did not allow it. She did, however, spend a few days at the Princess of Wales' summer home, often playing with Princess Charlotte of Wales. Randles went on to tour the country as a child, performing with John Parry. In 1808, she returned home and learned the harp. She went on to take lessons from Friedrich Kalkbrenner before moving to Liverpool and becoming a teacher.

== Biography ==
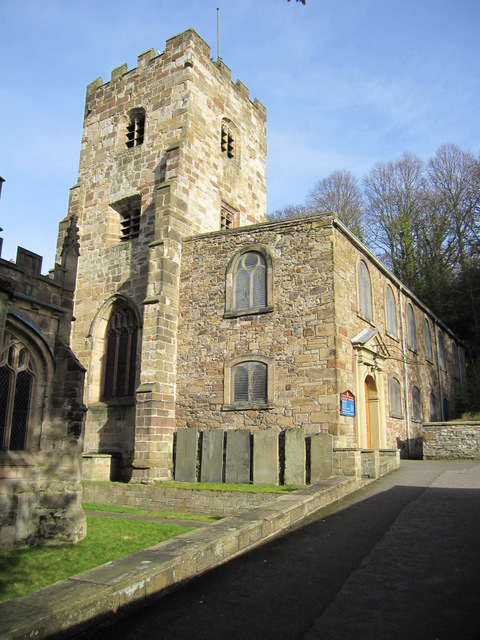
St. James Parish Church, where Edward Randles was organist

Elizabeth Randles, also known as Bessy, was born on 1 August 1800 in Wrexham, north Wales. Her father, Edward Randles, the organist at the Holywell parish church of St. James, lost his sight at the age of three as a result of small pox. Perhaps due to his lack of sight, his parents placed him to be trained under the blind harpist John Parry, (Note: The John Parry with whom Randles and her father subsequently went on tour was a different man: the blind harpist died before Randles was born.) under whom he excelled. Elizabeth was the youngest of Edward's several children including her brother, also named Edward, who would become a subsequent organist at the parish church.

At the age of sixteen months, Randles enjoyed pressing keys on the piano and attempting to "pick out a melody". One day, while Randles was ill, he noticed someone attempting to play Blue Bells of Scotland on the nearby piano. Assuming it was one of his older children, he requested they stopped and was surprised to find it was Randles who was playing. Due to her age, she needed to hit each key with the side of the hand. He discovered that she could play the basic melody for both the Blue Bells of Scotland and Charley over the water. Her father decided to start teaching her some other simple tunes and the musical notes. Before she could talk, she had the ability to recognise notes and press the piano keys which related to them. Her father went on to teach Randles the melody to the Welsh folk song, Ar hyd y nos. Randles also attempted to play the chords so her father ended up teaching her the full piece.

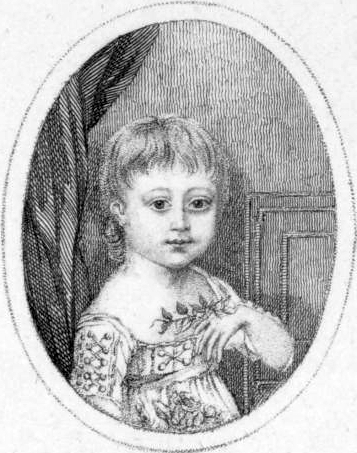
Portrait of Elizabeth Randles

During the summer of 1802, Wrexham was visited by a troupe of travelling comedians. One of the leaders, who had heard Randles play, requested that she performed with them. Before the age of two, she joined the troupe at Wrexham theatre to play Ar hyd y nos and The Downfall of Paris. There, she played her pieces with an apple and slice of cake on either side of the piano, receiving both when she finished for playing well. Over the next nine months, Randles played at the houses of Sir Watkin Williams-Wynn, Lady Dungannon and Lady Cunliffe. Williams-Wynn proposed that Randles play in a Wrexham concert during the spring of 1803, under the direction of the Welsh harpist John Parry. (Note: The blind harpist John Parry who had trained Randles' father died in 1782, before Randles was born) The concert was postponed a number of times due to the illness of Randles' mother, who insisted they carry on without her. On the night of the concert, Randles' mother died, after hearing that it was a success.

By the time Randles was three and a half, she was invited to play for King George III, Queen Charlotte, and other members of the Royal Family. The recital was a success and the king presented Randles with 100 guineas (worth approximately £96,000 in 2014). (Note: Comparing average earnings between 1803 and 2014, 100 guineas is valued at £95,950.00 by MeasuringWorth.com) She created such a sensation that Caroline, Princess of Wales, wished to adopt her though her father would not allow it. The publicity of the royal concert led to a subsequent breakfast concert for the public, with tickets costing 1 guinea each (approximately £960 in 2014). (Note: Comparing average earnings between 1803 and 2014, 1 guineas is valued at £959.50 by MeasuringWorth.com) The concert was held at Cumberland Gardens, with approximately 500 people "of first rank" attending. All profits of the breakfast, as well as donations by the attendees, were given to Randles in the form of various trusts.

"Do you know that my grandfather is King of England, and my father is Prince of Wales?"

"Well, and my father is organist at Wrexham."

— Conversation between Princess Charlotte of Wales aged 8 and Randles aged 4.

Randles spent a few days under the care of the Princess of Wales, at her summer home, the Pagoda in Blackheath. There, she spent time playing with a young Princess Charlotte of Wales, To ensure that she had sufficient funds for her education, Randles, her father, and Parry toured the rest of the United Kingdom between 1805 until 1808. In June 1808, she returned to London to perform at the Hanover Square Rooms, sponsored by the Prince of Wales and the Marchioness of Downshire. Parry remained in London, whilst Randles and her father returned home. There she learned to play the harp and by the age of fourteen she was proficient in both instruments, as well as the organ. She returned to London in 1818 to take harp lessons from François-Joseph Dizi and piano lessons from Friedrich Kalkbrenner.

Randles moved to Liverpool, teaching harp, piano and singing regularly at a school in Ellesmere, and returning each weekend to attend to her father until his death in 1823. Randles' health was described as "delicate" and she died of "decline" on 6 May 1829 in Liverpool. Her musical skill at such a young age left her known as the "Little Cambrian Prodigy".
