= William Ludwig =

William Ludwig may refer to:

- William Ludwig (screenwriter)
- William Ludwig (baritone)
- William F. Ludwig, Sr., American percussionist and founder of Ludwig Drums
