= Alan Abel (musician) =

American percussionist (1928–2020)

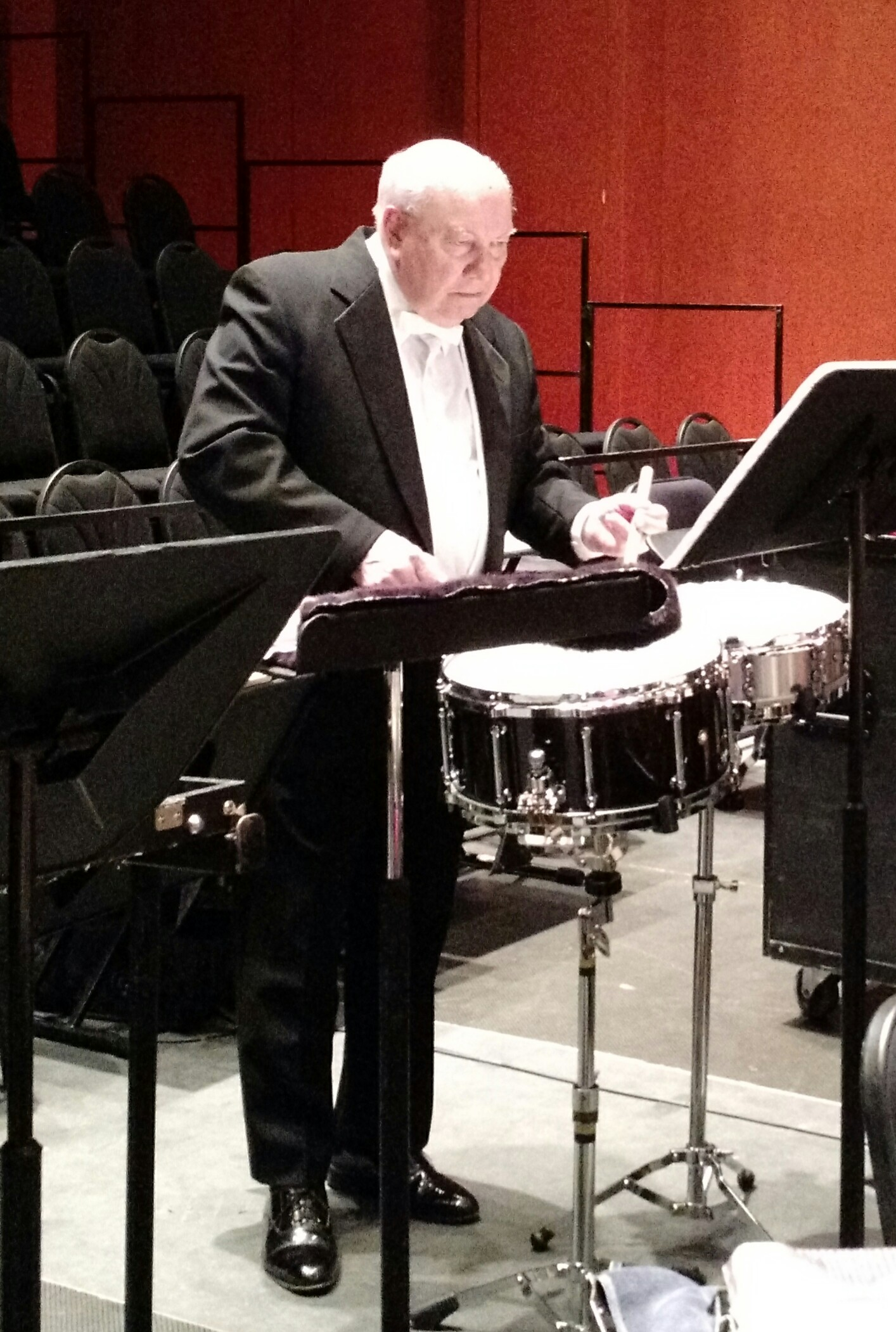
- Alan Abel performing in 2015

Background information
- Born: December 6, 1928; Hobart, Indiana, U.S.
- Died: April 25, 2020 (aged 91) Wynnewood, Pennsylvania, U.S.
- Genres: Classical music
- Occupation: Percussionist
- Years active: 1951–2020
- Formerly of: Rochester Philharmonic Orchestra, Oklahoma City Philharmonic, Philadelphia Orchestra

Alan Abel (December 6, 1928 – April 25, 2020) was an American percussionist, music educator, and inventor of musical instruments. He was the associate principal percussionist of the Philadelphia Orchestra from 1959 until his retirement in 1997. He is widely regarded as one of the most important percussion educators of the twentieth century, having taught at Temple University beginning in 1972. Abel's inventions include several unique and ubiquitous triangles and a bass drum stand that allowed the instrument to be suspended with the use of rubber bands.

== Early life and education ==
Abel was born in Hobart, Indiana, in 1928. He studied with Clarence Carlson at the Roy Knapp School and then with Haskell Harr and William Street at the Eastman School of Music from 1947 to 1951, where he earned a performance degree and played part-time with the Rochester Philharmonic Orchestra.

== Career ==
After enlisting and playing in the United States Air Force Band from 1951 to 1953, he performed with the Oklahoma City Symphony from 1953 to 1959. In 1959, he became a member of the Philadelphia Orchestra and remained there until the end of his career in 1997. He was named Associate Principal Percussionist of the orchestra in 1972.

In 1998, he was inducted into the Percussive Arts Society Hall of Fame. In 2012, he was awarded an honorary Doctorate of Music by the New England Conservatory of Music.

Abel was also a teacher at Rutgers University, Rowan University, and Temple University.

=== Musical instruments ===
Abel's predecessor at the Philadelphia Orchestra, James Valerio, had a custom-made triangle which was coveted by his peers. After Valerio loaned it to Abel for two years, Abel devised a way to recreate the sound and created the "Alan Abel triangle", which uses a piece of chromed brass. Used because of its overtone-rich sound, the triangle has been manufactured since 1963.

Abel also invented the "suspended" bass drum stand in the early 1960s, which he manufactured himself until 2013, when he handed manufacturing to Andrew Reamer, who had previously supplied the drums. The stand allows the bass drum to be suspended on a ring that swivels. The suspended bass drum stand is used by most American symphonic orchestras, and the concept has been copied and imitated by multiple drum hardware manufacturers worldwide.

== Death ==
Abel died of complications from COVID-19 on April 25, 2020, during the COVID-19 pandemic in Pennsylvania.
