= Mitch Markovich =

American musician (born 1944)

- Born: Mitch Markovich Jr. August 19, 1944 (age 81); Chicago, Illinois, U.S.
- Genres: drum and bugle corps, marching band, rock, Latin, jazz, gospel, and Contemporary christian music
- Occupations: Musical artist, educator, clinician, and composer
- Years active: 1957–present

Mitch Markovich (born August 19, 1944) is an American percussionist, composer, educator, and clinician in the areas of rudimental drumming, marching percussion, drum and bugle corps, and marching band. He is best known for his intensive marching snare drum solo compositions and record-setting performances, entitled "Tornado" and "Stamina", and for his percussion quartet composition entitled "Four Horsemen". Markovich's contributions to the style, notation, composition, and performance of percussion have endured over the last five decades.

He is the only person to have ever become both three-time consecutive undefeated National Champion, and the five-time consecutive undefeated Illinois State snare champion. He contributed to, or was directly responsible for twelve National and twenty-three State, Individual, and Group Championships in the drum and bugle corps marching percussion field. He was a marching member of the National Champion Chicago Cavaliers, and he has instructed, composed, and consulted with them and with other drum corps including the following: National Champion Chicago Royal Airs; the National Champion Argonne Rebels from Great Bend, Kansas; the Santa Clara Vanguard from California;the Nisei Ambassadors from Chicago and the Millstadt Crusaders from Illinois.

Markovich is currently a clinician and concert artist for Pearl Drums and the Evans Drum Head Company. He is a drum set specialist in many styles including rock, Latin, jazz, gospel, and Contemporary christian music.

== Career ==
=== Student career ===
Mitch Markovich studied music at Indiana University under George Gaber, and at The American Conservatory of Music in Chicago under James Dutton. He studied briefly under Ludwig Drum Company Clinician and National Champion Frank Arsenault, whose likeness would be later depicted upon the covers of Markovich's Rudimental Contest Series. He received his Bachelor of Music Degree from Fort Hays State University.

== Teaching career ==
Mitch Markovich first developed his international reputation in percussion, as a clinician and educational representative for the Ludwig Drum Company. He has taught and performed at major universities throughout the United States including Indiana University, Ohio State University, the University of Southern California, the University of Texas, the University of Missouri at Kansas City Conservatory of Music, the University of Wisconsin, and Northwestern University. He was the Head of the Percussion Department at Fort Hays State University. He has been on the faculty of the Joy School of Performing Arts.

He has headed clinics and performances at the International Festival of Percussion Art in Warsaw, Poland in 2004, and 2005. He was a featured clinician at the Percussive Arts Society International Conventions in Columbus, Ohio and at Nashville, Tennessee. He was clinician and guest soloist at the 2002 High School All-State Festival of Performance at Arizona State University. He was guest clinician and judge at the University of Texas at El Paso.

Mitch Markovich was a member of the National Championship winning Chicago Cavaliers Drum and Bugle Corps in the 1960s. He was the President of the National Association of Rudimental Drummers (N.A.R.D.) from 1976 to 1977. He has performed at the Civic Opera House, and with Dick Schory's Percussion Pops Orchestra at Chicago's Orchestra Hall. Today, he conducts private lessons, is a Pearl clinician, is an endorser of Evans drum heads, and serves in a number of Christian church bands and projects.

== Bibliography ==
=== Musical ===
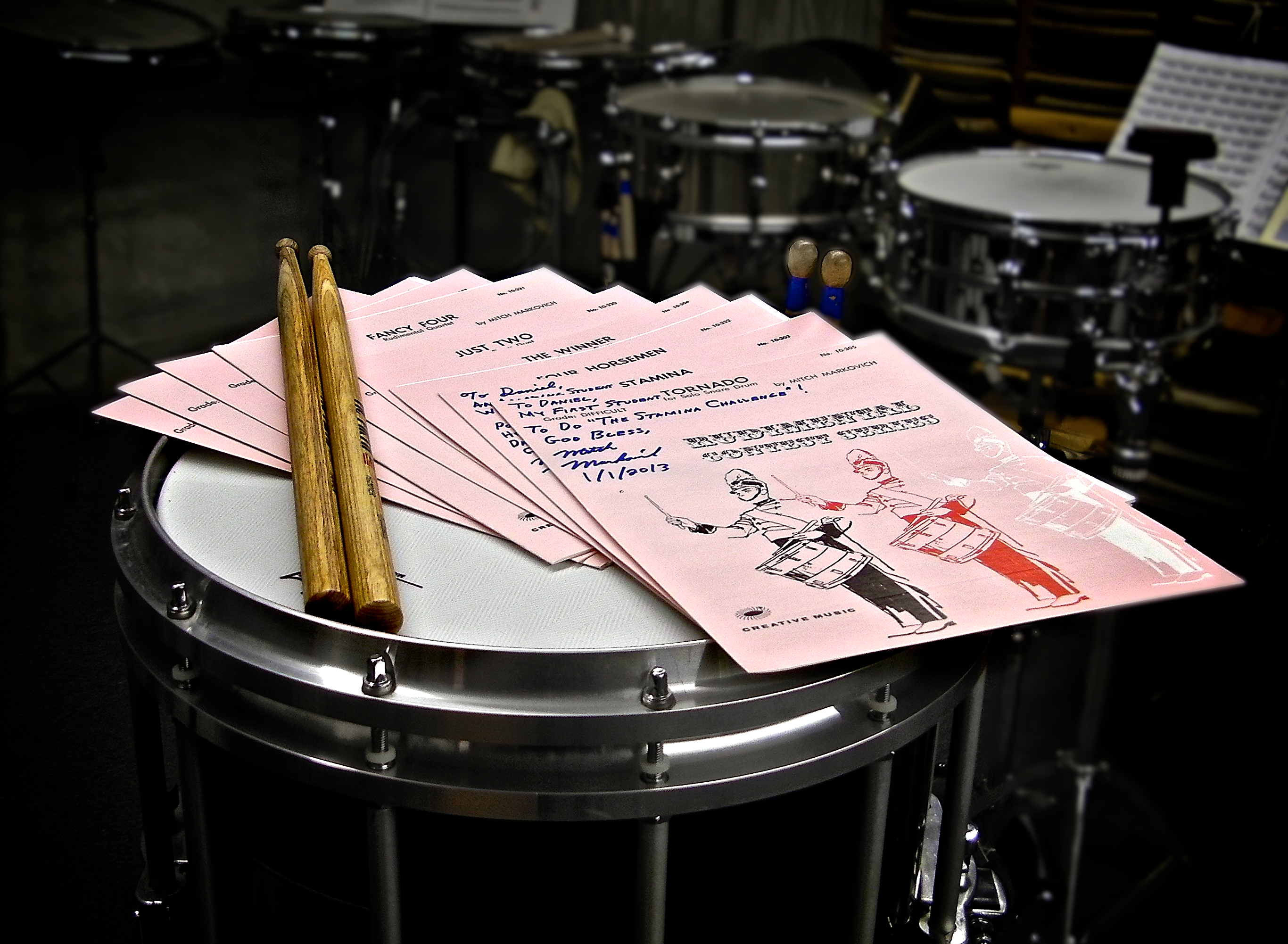
Rudimental Contest Series sheet music, perched atop a modern marching snare drum, with the cover featuring an illustration of Frank Arsenault

Mitch's solos were the snare equivalent of Mount Everest ... Do, or die!

Mitch Markovich is the composer of a ten-piece series titled Rudimental Contest Series, published in 1966. This collection of rudimental solos, duets, and quartets ranges from "Easy" to "Difficult"; and it features various combinations of the snare drum, tenor drum, and bass drum.

The collection's greatest impact upon percussion culture may be found in its more rigorous solos for marching snare drum, such as "Stamina" and "Tornado". Continuously used as audition and contest pieces over the last five decades, they are widely considered to be traditional standards. Notoriously difficult even for experts, these solos have served as authoritative benchmarks of physical performance and academic correctness. Gregg Bissonette cited "Tornado" as an advanced traditional standard piece, in the rudimental snare section of his training video titled Private Lesson.

Rudimental Contest Series

Title	Description	Tempo	Grade	Source
"Stamina"	rudimental solo for snare drum	132 BPM	"Difficult"	
"Tornado"	rudimental solo for snare drum	130 BPM	"Difficult"	
"Four Horsemen"	rudimental quartet for two snare drums, tenor drum, and bass drum	152 BPM	"Medium"	
"The Winner"	rudimental solo for snare drum	128 BPM	"Medium"	
"Just Two"	rudimental duet for snare drums	128 BPM	"Medium"	
"Teamwork"	rudimental quartet for two snare drums, tenor drum, and bass drum	128 BPM	"Medium"	
"Fancy Four"	rudimental quartet for snare drum, tenor drum, and two bass drums	104 BPM	"Easy"	
"Three Minus One"	rudimental duet for snare drum, tenor drum, and two bass drums	104 BPM	"Easy"	
"Countdown"	rudimental solo for snare drum	104 BPM	"Easy"	
"High Flyer"	rudimental solo for snare drum	104 BPM	"Easy"	

=== Literature ===
Mitch Markovich has authored many articles for the now defunct annual Ludwig Magazine, where he has actively detailed and encouraged the replication of his core techniques and introduced entirely new techniques. He has consistently assured players that his music is not physically impossible, given the optimal technique.

=== Discography ===
Recording Date	Title	Description	Source
1960	VFW Nationals Drum and Bugle Corps Finals	Briggs Stadium, Detroit, Michigan	
1961	VFW Nationals Drum and Bugle Corps Finals		
June 3, 1962	1962 Preview of Champions, Vol. 2	Roosevelt Stadium, Jersey City, New Jersey	
March 30, 1968	Civic Opera House	Chicago, Illinois (the source tape of Markovich's and Arsenault's solos was physically degraded, and thus disincluded from the CD)	

== Reception ==
"Stamina" is one of Markovich's many rudimental masterpieces. As the title simply implies, it requires demanding technique, strength, and a great deal of stamina ... As the drummer is sweating and struggling to make it to the finish, the audience sees fast and loud drumming that is a simple crowd pleaser.

— Michael Mazzullo, recital program notes from the Howard County Public School System High School G/T Music Program

At first glance his solos appeared too difficult, maybe even unplayable. ... Mitch's solos were the snare equivalent of Mount Everest to a mountain climber; conquer them because they are there! Do, or die!

— Rick Beckham, owner of RudimentalDrumming.com, open letter recommending Markovich for inclusion into the Drum Corps International Hall of Fame

I was fortunate to be in the audience for this special night [in 1968] at the Civic Opera House. The Glenview (Chicago), IL-based Drum Corps Digest magazine presented this showcase featuring 10 outstanding drum and bugle corps, along with two featured soloists – Mitch Markovich and Frank Arsenault.

— Steve Vickers, publisher, Drum Corps World newspaper

Now, what have we done with our American NARD rudiments? Well, for one, I am very proud of the fact that we have the best drummers in the world – be it dance, concert or military. ... I could name many more of the famous percussionists who are rudimentally trained – such as Bobby Christian, his son Norman Christian, Frank Arsenault, Mitch Markovich, etc., etc.

— William F. Ludwig, Sr., then President of the National Association of Rudimental Drummers, The Importance of Drum Rudiments
