= Lancraft Fife and Drum Corps =

Lancraft Fife and Drum Corps is an Ancient Fife and Drum Corps based in North Haven, Connecticut, and is a member of the Connecticut Fifers and Drummers Association. Lancraft was founded in 1888 by conservative Freemasons, but over the years has become the pride of Irish Americans.

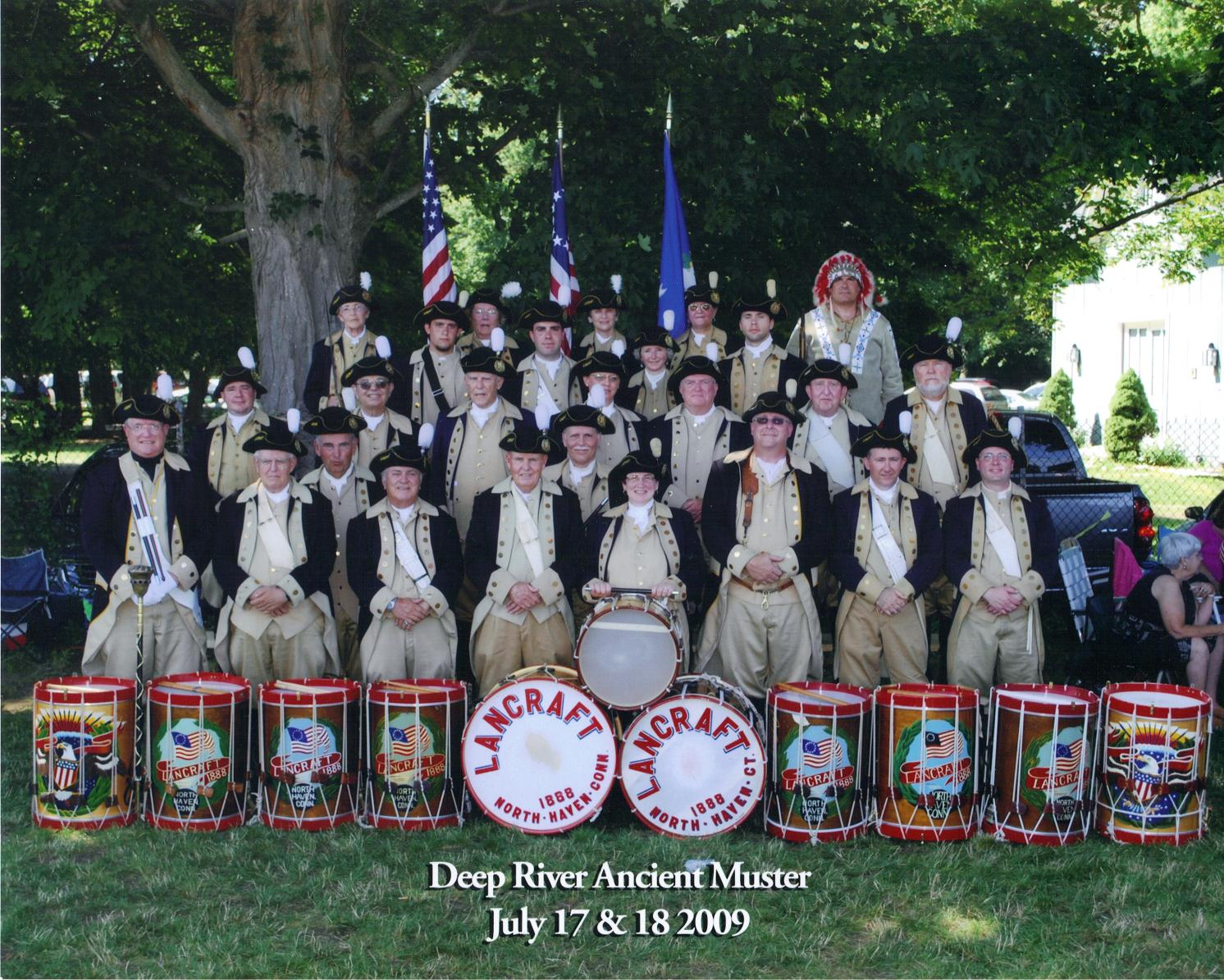
Lancraft Fife and Drum Corps Deep River Ancient Muster 2009

== Lancraft mission statement ==
- To promote and perpetuate the art of fifing and drumming.
- To preserve and perform the traditional music of Colonial America.
- To support and participate in the Company of Fifers and Drummers.
- To help educate school children about fifing and drumming.
- To furnish Lancraft members a friendly, family social environment.
- To be a good cultural non-profit citizen of North Haven and Connecticut.

== Corps history ==
Lancraft was organized along the banks of the Quinnipiac River in the Fair Haven section of New Haven, Connecticut, in 1888, and has been in continuous operation ever since. The corps is named after New Haven Oysterman Ed Lancraft, who donated the first Continental Army uniforms to the corps, and who allowed the corps to rehearse in one of his oyster houses.

=== Daniel English ===
Daniel M. English was a world champion rudimental snare drummer who died April 14, 1931, at the age of 28. English was a member of Lancraft from 1918 until his death in 1931. He was also active in the executive committee of the Connecticut Fifers and Drummers Association.

English learned to drum under the instruction of J. Burns Moore, a nationally prominent drummer and instructor, and long time percussionist with the New Haven Symphony Orchestra. He became Lancraft Drum Sergeant after winning his first Connecticut snare drumming title in 1925; he repeated in 1926, '27 and '28. He also won the North East States, US National Championship, held in Brooklyn, New York, in 1930, and the world title at Naugatuck, Connecticut, in 1928.

English was both a player and instructor with the Yale University Band. He taught many young drummers with the St. Francis School Drum Corps, was an instructor for both the New Haven and West Haven Institutes of Music and their respective drum corps, and had many private students.

Sanford A. Moeller, a champion rudimental drummer, made it a point to cultivate a personal relationship with Dan. He recognized that Dan was an exceptional Burns Moore product and wanted to support and acknowledge the fact that he was an excellent drummer representing the 'ancient traditions'.

In September 1930, Moeller drummed every step from Madison Square Garden to the Boston Armory for the opening of the American Legion National Convention. When 'Gus' (as many called him) was passing through New Haven, Dan invited him to his home. Moeller appreciated the attention and took the time to thank Dan in a type-written letter a few weeks later, thus, showing the mutual respect and friendship the two had for each other. That letter and others written to Dan by Moeller can be found in the Corps' archives.

=== Dan English Trophy ===
In memory of Dan English, a trophy was presented by Lancraft at the August 1932 State Convention held at Meriden, Connecticut. The Dan English Trophy was retired to Lancraft's Moriarty Hall trophy case in 1988.

The inscription reads:

DAN ENGLISH TROPHY
AWARDED BY
LANCRAFT FIFE & DRUM CORPS
FOR INDIVIDUAL SNARE DRUMMING
SENIOR CLASS

== Corps organization ==
At a regular business meeting in 1898, it was voted to hold corps rehearsals on Thursday evenings and to this day Lancraft still rehearses on Thursday nights at Moriarty Hall. The corps draws its 65 plus members from towns throughout the state of Connecticut and from other New England states, as well as from Pennsylvania, Ohio, and California. Many activities and management duties are performed by corps members whose marching days are over, and who are honored every year on the last Thursday in April at the annual Old Timer's Night.

The corps membership elects officers at their annual business meeting held the first Thursday in November. The elected officers handle all the day-to-day management duties of the corps and include the offices of President, Vice-President, Treasurer, Recording Secretary, Financial Secretary, Business Manager, and Recruiter.

Line officers handle all rehearsals and the day-to-day management of the marchers and include the ranks of Drum Major, Color Guard Sergeant, Fife Sergeant, Fife Corporal, Drum Sergeant, Bass Drum Corporal, and Armorer.

== Instrumentation ==
Lancraft performs in the traditional Ancient style, using a six-hole wooden fife and wooden rope tension snare and bass drums that are played in the ancient rudimental style.

Over the course of Lancraft history, many different fifes have been used; most were the product of George Cloos, Ferrary, or Cooperman. The Cloos Company continued to make fifes up to 1946, after which the company was sold to the Penzel Company. It later became known as Penzel and Mueller, which continued to make fifes under the Cloos name. The company went out of business in 1952. In 1990, the corps switched to the Model F Fife, made of grenadilla wood with chrome ferrules.

Sanford A. Moeller, National Drum Champion and Lancraft member, was also a fine drum builder. On August 8, 1954, Moeller personally delivered five new snare drums that were purchased by the Corps for $85.00 each. The Moeller drums are still being played today. Additional drums were purchased through the years from Buck Soistman, Bill Reamer, and his son, Andrew Reamer.

== Tunes ==
- The Star-Spangled Banner or Anacreontic Song - 1760
- 76 (medley); Yankee Doodle - 1770, The Girl I Left Behind - 1795 and The British Grenadiers - 1688
- Garryowen/Dublin Boy - 1780s
- Sisters
- Road To Boston - 1788
- Pop Hill
- Northwest Passage
- Green Cockade
- Chester - 1770
- Walter (medley)
- Minstrel Boy - 1813

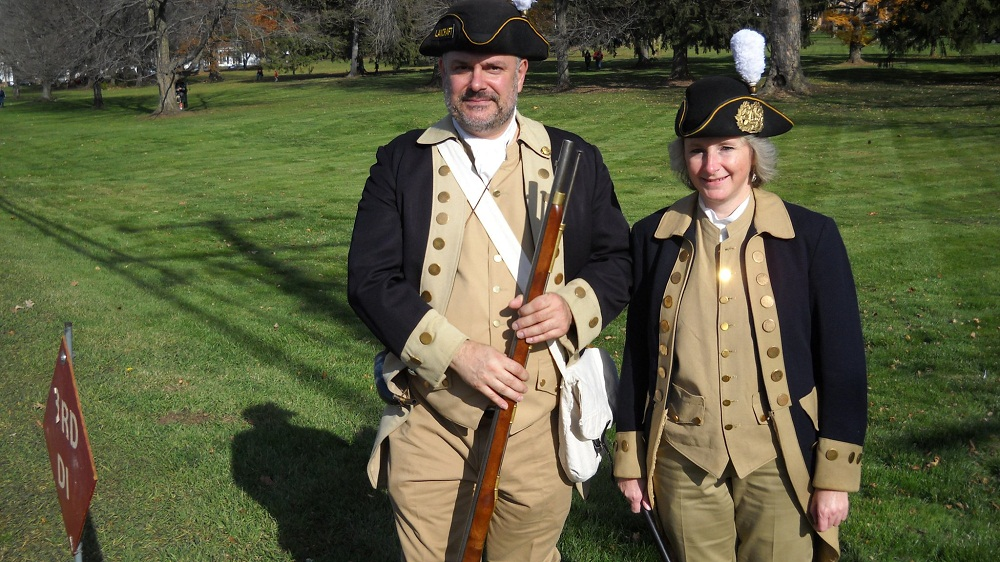
Lancraft Fife and Drum Corps Continental uniform

== Uniform ==
The Lancraft uniform consists of a black tricorn hat, white cockade, buff vest, white cravat, khaki pants, black leggings and navy blue tailcoat with buff trim and solid brass buttons. The uniform is a replica of that worn by General George Washington and his staff during the War for Independence in the late 18th century.

Since 1914, the Lancraft Color Guard has honored the first Native Americans in the United States by wearing leather Indian garb with full feathered war bonnets and by carrying and firing Brown Bess muskets at parades, musters and civic commemorations.

== Moriarty Hall ==
Even before the group had a name, they practiced in an old blacksmith shop on Fairmont Avenue, in the Fair Haven section of New Haven, across from Ed Lancraft's house and oyster dock. During the 1890s, the railroad built a new line and demolished the shop. After the shop was demolished, Ed Lancraft told the boys they could use one of his oyster sheds for rehearsals.

Some years later, a building fund was started to build their own clubhouse. The Lancraft retired members, or Olde Timers, answered the call for funds. Mike English, father of the late Lancraft drummer Dan English, donated the land in back of his home and took a mortgage. The two-story clubhouse was built and dedicated to Dan English.

Immediately after the mortgage was paid off in 1955, Interstate 95 was planned to be built and would take the clubhouse and land. A member of another drum corps, Stony Creek, told a woman of Lancraft's plight and she offered to sell the corps several acres of land behind her home in North Haven.

Lancraft bought the land, and on August 31, 1962, the members began to build their new clubhouse. By Labor Day, the building was completely finished. Lancraft moved into the new clubhouse, Moriarty Hall, in March 1963 and held their very first Olde Timers Night on June 13, 1963.

== Accolades ==
Lancraft has won 32 state championships and individual members have won 22 fife, 39 bass drum, and 27 snare drum championships. One of the earliest published accounts of a first-place finish in competition for Lancraft occurred in 1908 at Vernon, Connecticut, when eighteen men from Lancraft came in first place in the ancient class and received $50. The corps is also known for adding the singing part to the second strain of the song Green Cockade.

Their drumline has included drumming greats Earl Sturtze, Frank Arsenault, and Sanford A. Moeller, and has won 4 national titles and 2 world titles. One of their best known snare drummers, Hugh Quigley, was inducted into the National Drum Corps Hall of Fame.

Lancraft was chosen by Colonial Williamsburg to represent a Colonial period drum corps at its first ever Prelude to Independence ceremony in 1958. George P. Carroll, who was organizing the Old Guard Fife and Drum Corps at the time, traveled to Williamsburg to see Lancraft play in 1959 when they were the host corps of the event. At the time, Carroll said of Lancraft,

Lancraft is one of the oldest and best drum corps in the country. Their drumming was so accurate, that if you had a pistol and shot off one of the tips of the drumsticks, you'd get all of them because of their great placement.

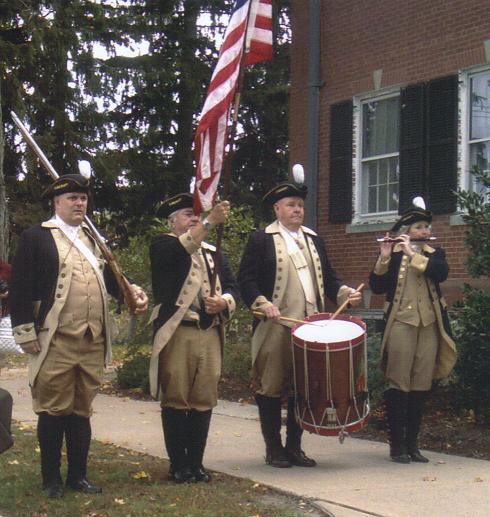
Lancraft Fife and Drum Corps performing at Jonathan Trumbull 300th birthday celebration at Trumbull, Connecticut October, 2010

== Muster and parade schedule ==
Lancraft has marched in the Greater New Haven St. Patrick's Day Parade for several decades. In summer, ancient drum corps from around the world travel to two of the oldest musters which are held at Deep River, Connecticut, in July, and Westbrook, Connecticut, in August. Lancraft has attended these ancient musters in Deep River and Westbrook every year since these events were first organized in 1953 and 1910 respectively. In September, Lancraft attends the annual Colonial Faire and Muster organized by the Sudbury Ancient Fyfe and Drum Companie. This muster is held on the grounds of the historic Wayside Inn at Sudbury, Massachusetts. In October, Lancraft attends Thunder In The Valley, a muster organized by the Moodus Drum and Fife Corps, and held on the grounds of the old Grange in Moodus, Connecticut.
