= Vistalite Drums =

Acrylic drum line

A Vistalite drumset in the "Tequila Sunrise" color scheme

Vistalite drums were a line of acrylic drums produced by the Ludwig Drum company, introduced in 1972. The name Vistalite refers to the translucent plastic that the shells were made of. Vistalite and acrylic offered a synthetic alternative to wood shells and were popularized by rock drummer John Bonham of Led Zeppelin.

The original Vistalites are a collector's item.

Bill Zickos was the father of the acrylic drums; he built the first experimental set in 1959 and received a US Patent (patent #3,626,458) for them in 1970.

== Original varieties ==
When marketing of Vistalites started in late 1972, the drums were available in clear, blue, green, red, amber, and yellow, with clear and blue being the largest sellers. In 1976 the company broadened the line to include "Rainbow" Vistalites with multicolored shells, with "Tequila Sunrise" (a combination of red, orange and yellow stripes) being one of the most popular combinations. Multi-colored acrylic shells were co-invented by Elvis Presley's drummer Ronn Tutt. Tutt, however, tried his invention and was unimpressed, enough that he immediately went back to playing maple drums. Other Vistalite variations included bass drums without tom mounts (often referred to as "virgin" bass drums) and concert toms (toms without lug holes or a rim on the bottom of the shell). The Vistalite drums are popular with collectors.

The green and red colors were eventually dropped due to slow sales. Translucent Smoke (a dark grey color), solid black, and solid white were added late during the Vistalite production run. A 1977 mis-order left Ludwig with a large surplus supply of the white shells, a problem the company resolved by covering many in chrome wrap, selling them as "faux stainless steel" drums. Singer/drummer Karen Carpenter was fond of vistalites and can be seen playing them on her 1970s TV shows. Keith Moon of the Who, Ron Bushy of Iron Butterfly, and Buddy Miles played acrylic sets.

== Tivoli Vistalite ==
In 1978, Ludwig created the Tivoli Vistalite by inserting small light bulbs into the shells. The kits were plagued by electrical problems – Bill Ludwig II is reported to have said that everything they made on Vistalite was lost on Tivoli. There were also problems with the shells cracking under the pressure of overtightened lugs and exposure to freezing temperatures. The original Vistalite line was phased out due to declining sales and the rising cost of oil-based plastics.

== Re-issued Vistalite ==
Ludwig reintroduced Vistalite drums in 2001, with the prime seller being a replica of the amber five-piece kit played by John Bonham. The re-issue shells are slightly thicker and, in the opinions of some, warmer sounding and more resonant than the originals. The original shells were at a supposed disadvantage due to a noncontinuous bearing edge. The new versions have a continuous 45-degree edge, making what some feel is a fuller, cleaner tone.

In 2006, a multitude of drum companies like SONOR (X-Ray), Tama (Starclassic Mirage), RCI International (Starlite), Fibes (Crystallite), ddrum (Diode and Diaton), Zickos, Peace (Echoplasm), and Kirchhoff Schlagwerk (Arctic series) now make acrylic drums thanks to an increase in popularity since 2001. Custom drum companies have also seen growth in demand.

Gold n Times acrylic shells are thicker and stronger than 1970s vistalites, but are glued and tabbed in the same manner. They are supplied to Tama and custom drum makers. They are approximately .220 inch (6 mm) thick. Acrylic shells can be glued with adhesives like cyanoacrylates. Modern adhesives are improved over those available in the 1970s. On November 20, 2009, Ray Ducoat, the company’s owner, died. Gold n Times ceased sales although production continued through other outlets.

RCI Starlight acrylic shells are "welded" at the seam. The company claims that vibration characteristics of their shells are tested and are superior to glued and tabbed shells. Like the Ludwig Vistalite, they are factory-equipped with a 45-degree bearing edge. Many of the designs are made to replicate original Vistalite colors and patterns.

Quality acrylic shells are also sold to drum parts and custom resellers under the brand "Aquabomb" acrylic shells. This brand name is owed and offered exclusively by Drum Supply House USA .

Acrylic shells are welded by applying solvents like di/trichloretheleye to the ends of the acrylic sheet. The sheet is partially dissolved, and when the ends are placed together, the resultant bond is as strong, or stronger than the shell itself. Additionally, the seam is very thin.

Gas custom drums of Australia uses sheets of Mitsubishi shinkolite, a high-quality acrylic used in the automotive industry and optics.

As in the 1970s, changes in oil prices impact the price of acrylics and hence the cost of drum shells made from them. As cited above, Ludwig references the oil shock of the late 1970s (and the impact it had on material costs and subsequent product pricing) as one of the main reasons original Vistalite production ended in 1979.

== Popularity ==
Rockers and jazzmen alike enjoy the wide tuning range of acrylic drums, and the dry, but punchy and projecting sound. A criticism of Vistalite and acrylic shells in general is that some feel they sound brittle, artificial, and lack the complexity of their wood counterparts. It may be worth noting that some producers have been quoted as asking for Vistas as they are forgiving in humidity variable environments, and seem to offer more consistent notes, session over session.

Vistalites are substantively louder than traditional drums with fewer overtones. With modern amplification and recording techniques, acrylic can be made to sound very close to wood. In a 2007 issue of Modern Drummer magazine (www.moderndrummer.com), one reviewer stated of the Tama mirage acrylic drum kit "When I close my eyes, I find it hard to believe it's not a wood kit."

Many professional drummers used Vistalites or similar acrylic drums in the '70s and '80s. Jazzmen like Billy Cobham, Lionel Hampton, and Bill Zickos were well known acrylic kit players in the 1970s.

In the electronic music scene, a clear Ludwig Vistalite kit is featured in the award-winning Daft Punk music video Robot Rock.

Recently, drummer Mike Portnoy of the progressive metal group Dream Theater used a Tama drum company-built acrylic kit for a John Bonham tribute, and for parts of Dream Theater's 2005 Octavarium CD and DVD. As of summer 2007 Portnoy now plays a Tama Mirage dubbed "the mirage monster" to support his 2007 tour. This underscores the resurgent popularity of these shells, and brings them into the public eye. Dominic Howard, drummer for the band Muse, previously used Tama Mirage drums for live performances and studio recordings (after his contract with Tama ended in 2009, he switched to DW). Drum tech Jeff Ocheltree included a segment on tuning the new Vistalite drums in his DVD "Trust Your Ears." He describes them as having a very "live" sound. Originally, drummers favored single-ply drum heads with a center dot for these drums. But as Jeff Ocheltree describes, the sound improves with the use of two-ply drum heads.

Austrian drummer/clinician Thomas Lang has toured with Sonor's new designer X-ray acrylics to rave reviews for his playing, and for the sound of these drums. In 2010, Thomas Lang stopped endorsing sonor and moved on to DW drums.

Changing the overall attitude of drummers concerning the sound of acrylic drums has been a focus of the review media. In 2007 articles and reviews, the magazines gave unabashed praise for the look and sound of modern acrylic drums. Superlatives like "fat" and "warm" were liberally applied. These terms are normally given to wood-shelled drums to indicate that they have abundant low and midrange frequencies. With the right combination of drumheads and tuning, acrylics don't have to sound brittle or artificial. European e-zine www.drummersdigest.com posted a very positive review of a Kirchoff Arctic series solid-cast acrylic kit, to include audio recordings that prove acrylics can sound as musical as other drum shell materials.

Ultimately, the difference in tone between acrylic shells, such as the Vistalite shells, and traditional wood and metal shells can be subtle, yet still present. While some acrylic shells have been criticized for their dry, dull tone, others have been raved about for years, such as the shells used by John Bonham. Many drummers, and musicians/recording engineers in general, have a preferred drum sound that they strive to attain when playing and recording, and while some wooden drums have seemed to dominate this recording field throughout recent decades, acrylic shells have still played a keystone role in numerous sought-after recordings.
