= George Lawrence Stone =

American drummer

George Lawrence Stone (1886–1967) was an American drummer and author.

He wrote the books Stick Control for the Snare Drummer (1935) and Accents and Rebounds for the Snare Drummer (1961). Among his students were Joe Morello, Gene Krupa, Lionel Hampton, and Vic Firth.

== Biography ==
George Lawrence Stone was born in 1886. He was the son of drum teacher and manufacturer George Burt Stone. George Lawrence learned drums and xylophone from his father and also helped out in his shop, where the elder Stone tucked drumheads, turned drumsticks, made wooden foot pedals and sold violins. George Lawrence also studied with Harry A. Bower and Frank E. Dodge, learned timpani from Oscar Schwar of the Philadelphia Orchestra, and studied music theory at the New England Conservatory of Music. In 1910, he was a xylophonist on the Keith Vaudeville Circuit, and he played timpani and bells with the Boston Festival Orchestra. Stone played in the pit of Boston's Colonial Theater under the baton of Victor Herbert, and was a member of the Boston Opera Orchestra for five years.

After George B. Stone's death in 1917, George Lawrence ran his father's drum factory and became principal of the Stone Drum and Xylophone School in Boston. He also wrote articles on drumming technique for International Musician and Jacob's Orchestra Monthly. Stone was a founding member of the National Association of Rudimental Drummers (NARD) which began in 1933, and served as its president for fifteen years. The publication of Stick Control made Stone even more in demand as a teacher, and drummers such as Gene Krupa, Sid Catlett, George Wettling, and Lionel Hampton sought out Stone's expertise.

Jazz drummer Joe Morello started taking lessons from Stone when he was sixteen. "Every lesson was a joy to go to," Morello said. "If you did something wrong, he had a way of letting you know about it, but without belittling you. He was a very gentle kind of man, and he had a good sense of humor. He had a way of bringing out the best in me." Stone, in turn, was inspired by Morello, who would add various accents to the exercises in Stick Control. Stone incorporated some of Morello's ideas into his book Accents and Rebounds, which he dedicated to Morello, and some of the exercises Stone wrote out for Morello appeared in Morello's 1983 book Master Studies.

Stone continued to teach drums on a part-time basis until his death in 1967, for the Music Department of the Medford Public School System, in Medford, Massachusetts.

As Stone's renown as a teacher increased, the George B. Stone & Son drum manufacturing business began to decline. The factory closed in the late 1930s and the equipment was idle until 1950 when Ralph Eames purchased it, using it to make Eames rope-tensioned parade drums. Today, some of Stone's equipment is still used by the Eames Drum Company in Saugus, MA, in the manufacture of its drum shells.

Stone continued to be active as a teacher through the 1940s. One of his students during that time was Vic Firth. "Mr. Stone was a droll Yankee type," Firth recalls, "but a very sweet man. He was probably one of the first technique builders of the teachers, and he felt it was terribly important to make music. His theory was that you can be a sculptor by virtue of owning a hammer and chisel, but you don't really sculpt anything until you have the technique to do it. Likewise, before you can do anything 'shapely' in music, you've got to have the hands to do it with."

George Lawrence Stone died at the age of 81 on November 19, 1967. His wife died two days later, and his son, George Lawrence Stone Jr., died thirty-two days after his father. Eulogizing his friend in The Ludwig Drummer, William F. Ludwig, Sr. said, "George was always helpful to everyone - his motto was 'Service before self.' May he rest in the satisfaction that he did his best for the percussion field for many, many years."

== Books ==
- Stick Control for the Snare Drummer (published 1935)
- Accents and Rebounds for the Snare Drummer (dedicated to his student Joe Morello)
- Mallet Control for the Xylophone
- Military Drum Beats for the School and Drum Corps (published 1931)
