= Clinic (music) =

Informal meeting with a guest musician

A musical clinic is an informal meeting with a guest musician, where a small-to-medium-sized audience questions the musician's styles and techniques and also how to improve their own skills. The musician might perform an entire piece, or demonstrate certain techniques for the audience to observe.

The objective is for the audience to learn from the guest musician. A musical clinic can apply to any type of musical instrument or player. The clinics are often held at musical instrument stores.

== See also ==
- Master class
