= The Downfall of Paris =

Traditional British tune

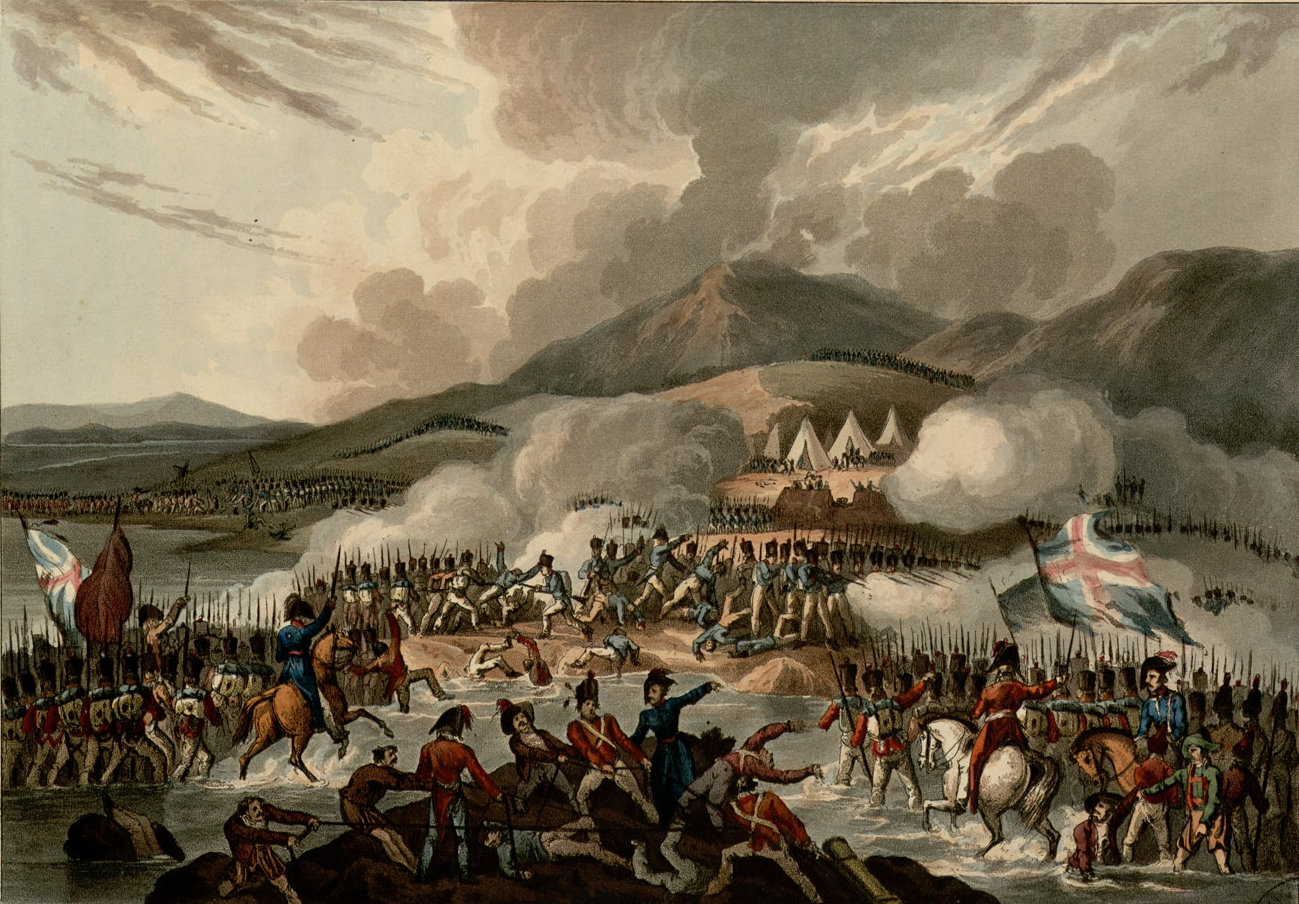
It was a popular marching tune for British regiments in the Peninsular War in Portugal and Spain.

"The Downfall of Paris" is a British traditional tune. It dates back to the Napoleonic Wars, and became a popular marching song amongst British troops fighting in the Peninsular War. Its tune is partly a reworking of the French song "Ça Ira". It emerged when British war fortunes were at a low ebb in the early 1800s, partly as a song of defiance. It was played in Egypt in 1801 when British troops took Alexandria from French occupying forces. When British troops entered Paris in 1815 following the victory at Waterloo, a regimental band struck up the tune only to be rebuked by Wellington who didn't wish to offend the inhabitants. Nonetheless, the bands of Britain's allies Prussia, Austria and Russia all played the tune as they paraded in occupied Paris. The tune has spread into both American and Irish folk music. The Irish band The Dubliners recorded a version in 1975 on their album Now. The American chamber ensemble, The Rolling Buzzard's Brigade led by Sean J. Kennedy, recorded a virtual rendition in the summer of 2020, which was later included on their debut album. The ensemble comprises an all-star cast of percussionists and brass players, including members of The Philadelphia Orchestra and the Canadian Brass.

== Bibliography ==
- Mackesy, Piers. British Victory in Egypt, 1801: The End of Napoleon's Conquest. Routledge, 2013.
- Muir, Rory. Salamanca 1812. Yale University Press, 2001.
- Richards, Donald Sydney. The Peninsula Veterans. Macdonald and Jane's, 1975.
