= William F. Ludwig Sr. =

American musician

- Born: July 15, 1879; Nenderoth, Germany
- Died: July 8, 1973 (aged 93)
- Occupations: Instrument Manufacturer, Percussionist, Entrepreneur, Author
- Writing career
- Notable awards: PAS Hall of Fame

William F. Ludwig (1879 – 1973) was an American percussionist, drum-maker, and founder of Ludwig Drums. He helped to create the National Association of Rudimental Drummers and is a member of the Percussive Arts Society Hall of Fame.

== Career ==
William Frederick Ludwig was the son of German immigrants to America, arriving when he was just eight years old in 1887. His father was a professional trombonist and Ludwig started taking music lessons upon arriving to Chicago that same year, initially on piano and violin. Ludwig soon switched to drums and became increasingly unhappy with the technology available for drum pedals. Ludwig's first musical gig was at the Wood Brother's Circus in 1895, followed by several other miscellaneous posts. In 1903 he joined the Chicago Symphony Orchestra. From 1904 to 1906 he performed with the English Grand Opera Co., and in 1909 he became the timpanist for the Chicago Philharmonic Orchestra and the Pittsburgh Symphony.

In 1909, with his brother Theobald Ludwig, William set up the Ludwig & Ludwig Drum Company. They manufactured the first modern-style bass drum pedal to meet the needs of jazz, ragtime, and circus drummers of the day. Ludwig played with the Chicago-Philadelphia Grand Opera Company from 1910 to 1912 when he joined the Chicago Civic Opera, a post that would last until 1914. He returned to the Chicago Symphony in 1915 and remained there until 1918 when he resigned to focus on manufacturing. Theobald died in 1918 from influenza, but the Ludwig Company continued to grow with William and was one of the largest drum companies in the world by the 1920s.

In 1933, at the American Legion National Convention, Ludwig and a group of 12 other notable rudimental drummers, including George Lawrence Stone, formed the National Association of Rudimental Drummers (NARD) to promote rudimental drumming. They organized a list of 13 essential drum rudiments, later to be followed by another 13 to complete the 26 Standard American Drum Rudiments. These would be the authoritative set of American rudiments until the Percussive Arts Society published another set in 1984.

Ludwig's company suffered during the Great Depression so he merged with Conn in 1930 and moved to Indiana. In 1937, he left Conn and founded the WFL Drum Company, which his son William F. Ludwig Jr. and daughter Betty would join in 1938. He published his Collection of Drum Solos featuring the 26 NARD rudiments in 1942, his Complete Drum Instructor in 1947 (interestingly, this volume lists 30 rudiments despite Ludwig's involvement in codifying the 26 NARD rudiments 14 years prior), and the WFL Drum Corps Manual in 1948.

In 1955, Ludwig bought the name Ludwig back from Conn (WFL drums had been directly competing with Conn-made Ludwig drums) in order to found the Ludwig Drum Company. He published the book The Ludwig Drum and Bugle Manual in 1956, followed by the Ludwig Tympani Instructor in 1957. He also published The Ludwig Drum Method in 1967. Ludwig Sr. ran his new company until his death in 1973, popularizing his drums through relationships with Ringo Starr of The Beatles and John Bonham of Led Zeppelin.

His son William F. Ludwig II was named president of the Ludwig Drum Company after his father's death. Ludwig's grandson William F. Ludwig III owns his own drum company called WFLIII Drums.

Ludwig performed with the Chicago Marine Band, T.P. Brooke, Max Bendix, Arthur Pryor's Band and several opera companies during his long career, and he was inducted into the Percussive Arts Society Hall of Fame in its inaugural year, 1972.

== Publications ==
- Collection of Drum Solos
- WFL Complete Drum Instructor
- WFL Drum Corps Manual
- The Ludwig Drum and Bugle Manual
- Ludwig Tympani Instructor
- The Ludwig Drum Method
