= Ludwig Drums =

American percussion instrument manufacturer

- Formerly: Ludwig & Ludwig; Leedy & Ludwig; WFL Drum Company
- Type: Subsidiary
- Industry: Musical instruments
- Founded: December 11, 1909; 116 years ago in Chicago, Illinois, United States
- Founder: William F. & Theobald Ludwig
- Headquarters: Monroe, North Carolina, United States
- Parent: Conn-Selmer
- Subsidiaries: Musser Mallet Company
- Website: ludwig-drums.com

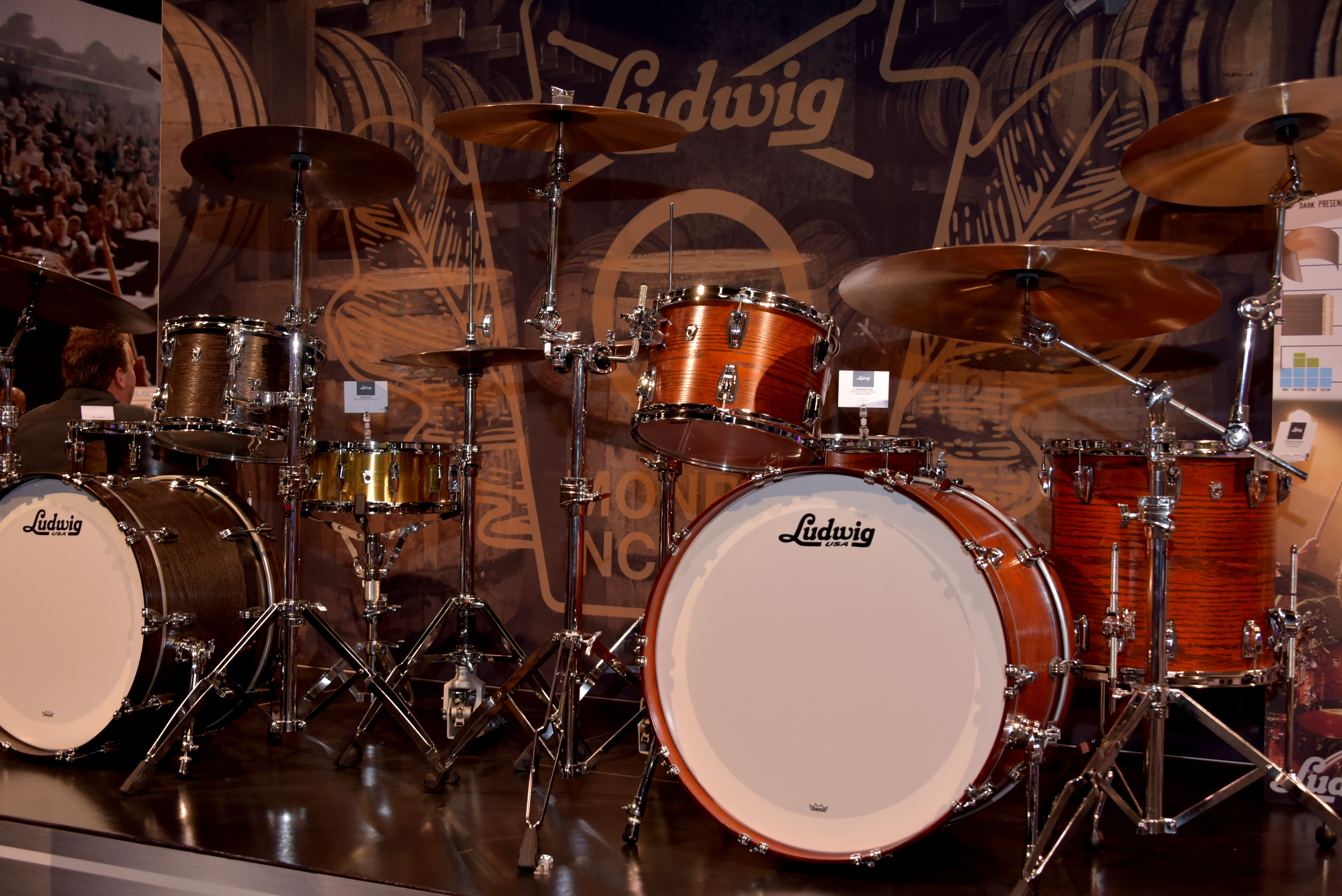
Ludwig Drums Exhibit at 'The NAMM Show' on January 17, 2020, in Anaheim, California

Ludwig Drums is an American musical instrument manufacturer, focused on percussion. It is a subsidiary of Conn-Selmer.

Products manufactured by Ludwig include timpani, drum kits, and drum hardware. The company also makes keyboard percussion instruments, such as marimbas, vibraphones, and xylophones, through the Ludwig-Musser brand.

== History ==
The Ludwig Drum Company was established in 1909 by William F. & Theobald Ludwig, sons of a German immigrant to the United States. William Jr. had been a professional drummer, playing with circuses and touring vaudeville shows, along with occasional work at skating-rinks. Since this work was irregular, he and his brother, Theobald, opened a drum shop in Chicago. Ludwig & Ludwig began seeking to design and manufacture a functional bass drum pedal.

The company added new products to its catalog, such as snare drums and timpani, in 1916. In 1917, Ludwig signed a deal to build rope-tensioned snare drums to support World War I. Theobald Ludwig died in 1918, and William continued on his own.

In the late 1920s, the company was sold to the C. G. Conn instrument company. William Ludwig stayed on to run the company for Conn (which also owned the Leedy Manufacturing Company at this time). Eventually, William Ludwig decided to leave Conn and start a new company of his own. He was unable to use the Ludwig name since that trademark then belonged to Conn, which continued to market Ludwig & Ludwig drums.

A Ludwig banjo in the Jazz Age

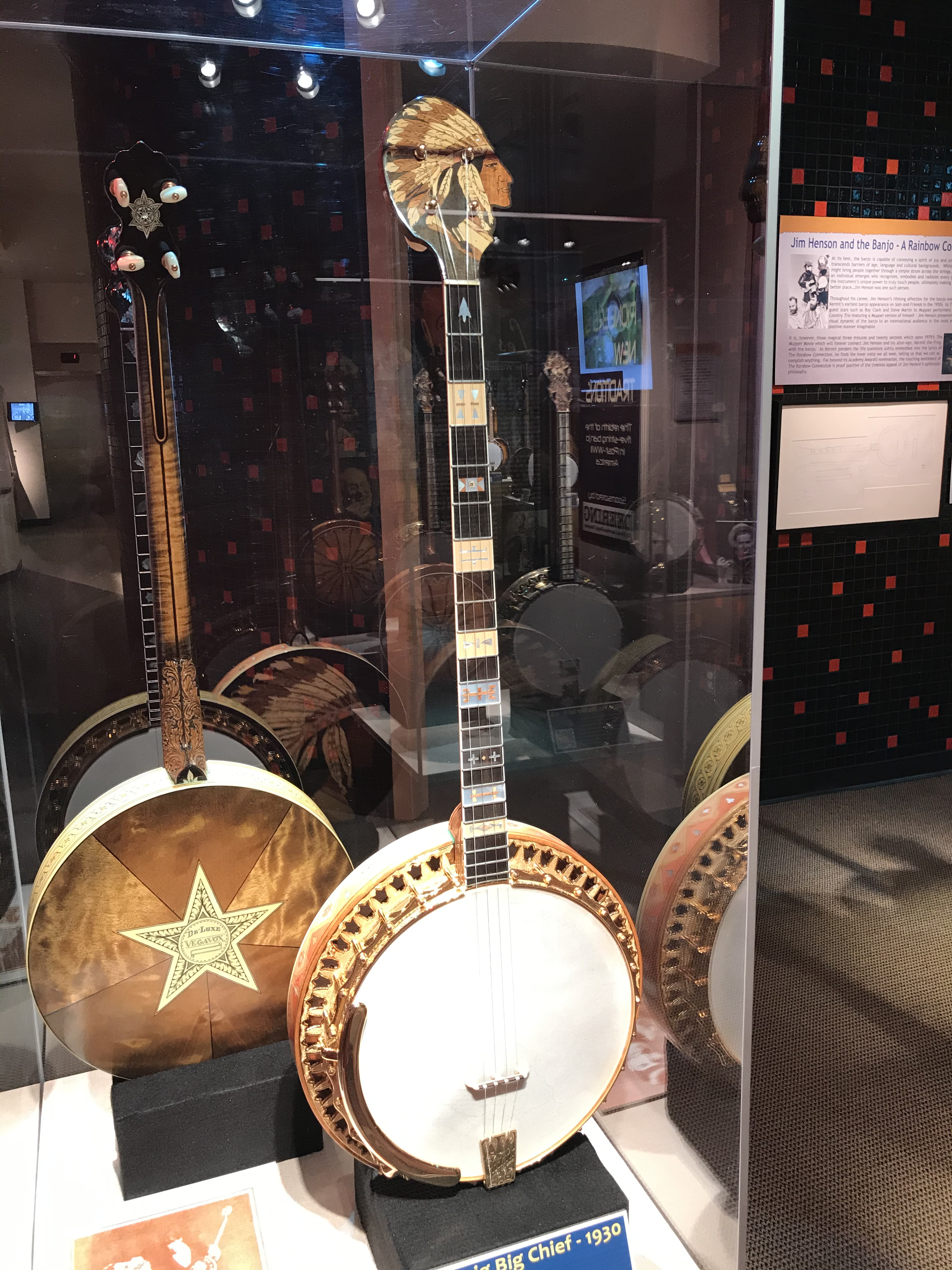
From about 1921 to 1931, Ludwig made banjos, such as the Big Chief Banjo (1930), displayed at the American Banjo Museum.

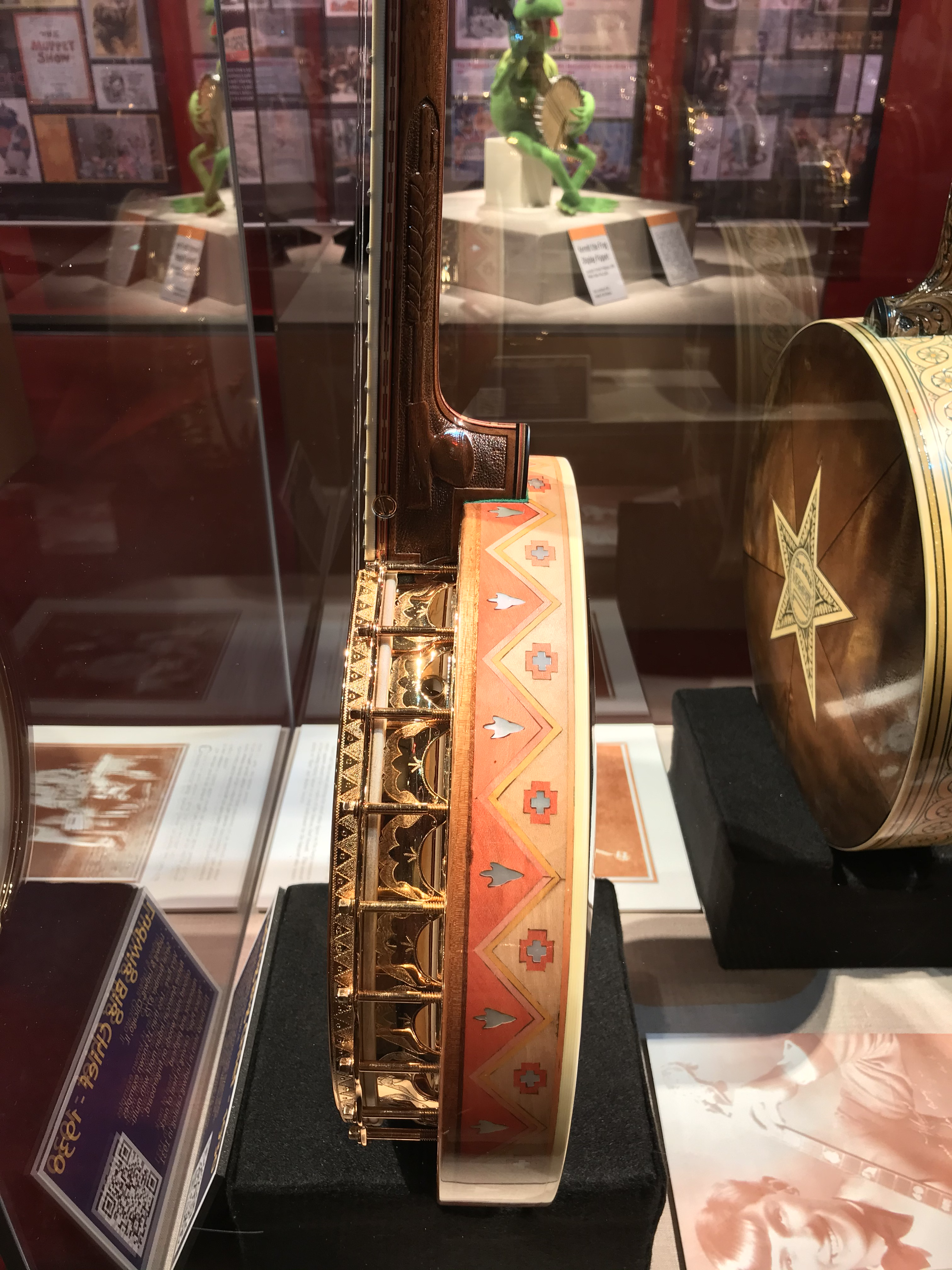
The Big Chief banjo was highly decorated, with gold plating, engraving, and decorative inlayed wood patterns.

The back, in wood inlay. The banjos are highly prized today, but were ultimately a financial failure, the market having disappeared.

In 1937, William purchased a factory and established the WFL Drum Company, naming it after his own initials. While the firm continued to produce drums on a modest scale throughout the World War II, William remained determined to transform the business into a major manufacturer postwar. At the time, WFL was a direct competitor to Ludwig & Ludwig. Following Conn's merger of its two drum brands to form Leedy & Ludwig in the early 1950s, Conn eventually decided to withdraw from the drum market entirely. This presented an opportunity in 1955 for William and his son, Bill Jr, to buy back the Ludwig trademark. Over the ensuing years, the company’s products transitioned from the WFL name back to the original Ludwig brand.

Despite initial success, Ludwig's global breakthrough would occur February 9, 1964, when The Beatles made their historic American TV debut on The Ed Sullivan Show. The Ludwig logo, displayed on the front of Ringo Starr's bass drum, could be seen by a television audience of some seventy-three million people. Starr had chosen that brand upon joining the band not for its musical properties but because he liked the oyster pearl black color of the drum kit he chose.

[Ringo Starr] put our name on the front of his bass drum head ... [because] he was so proud that he had an imported drum set from America, especially from a famous company like Ludwig, that at the time of purchase he insisted on having the Ludwig name painted on the front of the head!

— William Ludwig's grandson

The publicity resulted in Ludwig's sales doubling quickly to $13 million, which prompted production to increase to around-the-clock as the company became the foremost drum manufacturer in North America for twenty years.

Ludwig acquired the Musser Mallet Company, a manufacturer of xylophones, marimbas and vibraphones, in 1965. Ludwig was a strong presence in the marching drum market. During the 1970s, Ludwig's "Challenger" line of snare drums offered sophisticated tuning and strong build quality. Ludwig drums were used by many leading drum and bugle corps.

On 4 November 1981, William F Ludwig II sold the business to the Selmer Company. Selmer closed the Damen Avenue factory in the ensuing years and moved drum production to Monroe, North Carolina, in 1984. In 2002, Ludwig became a brand of Conn-Selmer, Inc., through a merger with its parent company.

The Musser manufacturing facility remained in La Grange, Illinois, until 2013, and was then moved to Elkhart, Indiana.

== Notable artists ==
- Al Jackson Jr. - Booker T. & the M.G.'s
- Alan Gratzer - REO Speedwagon
- Alan White - Yes
- Alex Van Halen - Van Halen
- Aynsley Dunbar
- Bill Ward - Black Sabbath
- Bruce Crump - Molly Hatchet
- Buddy Rich
- Bun E. Carlos - Cheap Trick
- Carlton Barrett - Bob Marley and the Wailers
- Carl Palmer - Emerson, Lake & Palmer
- Clyde Stubblefield - James Brown
- Danny Barcelona - Louis Armstrong
- Dino Danelli - The Rascals
- Eric Carr - KISS
- Don Brewer - Grand Funk Railroad
- Ed Shaughnessy - The Tonight Show Band
- Ed Thigpen
- George Formby
- Ginger Baker - Cream
- Hal Blaine
- Hunt Sales - Todd Rundgren, Iggy Pop, David Bowie
- Ian Paice - Deep Purple
- Jabo Starks - James Brown
- Jack White - The Dead Weather
- Jim McCarty - The Yardbirds
- Joe Morello
- Joey Kramer - Aerosmith
- John Bonham - Led Zeppelin
- John Densmore - The Doors
- Jon Hiseman
- Karen Carpenter - The Carpenters
- Kenny Clare
- Max Roach
- Meg White - The White Stripes
- Melvin Parker - James Brown
- Mick Fleetwood - Fleetwood Mac
- Mitch Mitchell - Jimi Hendrix
- Mick Tucker - The Sweet
- Nick Mason - Pink Floyd
- Papillion-La Vista South High School
- Patrick Carney - The Black Keys
- Questlove - The Roots
- Ray Bauduc
- Ray McKinley
- Richard Allen
- Ringo Starr - The Beatles
- Roger Hawkins - Muscle Shoals Rhythm Section
- Roger Taylor - Queen
- Ron Tutt
- Roy Haynes
- Taylor Hawkins - Foo Fighters
- Viola Smith

== Gallery ==
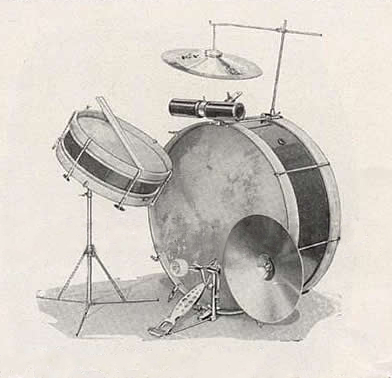
1918 Ludwig drum set

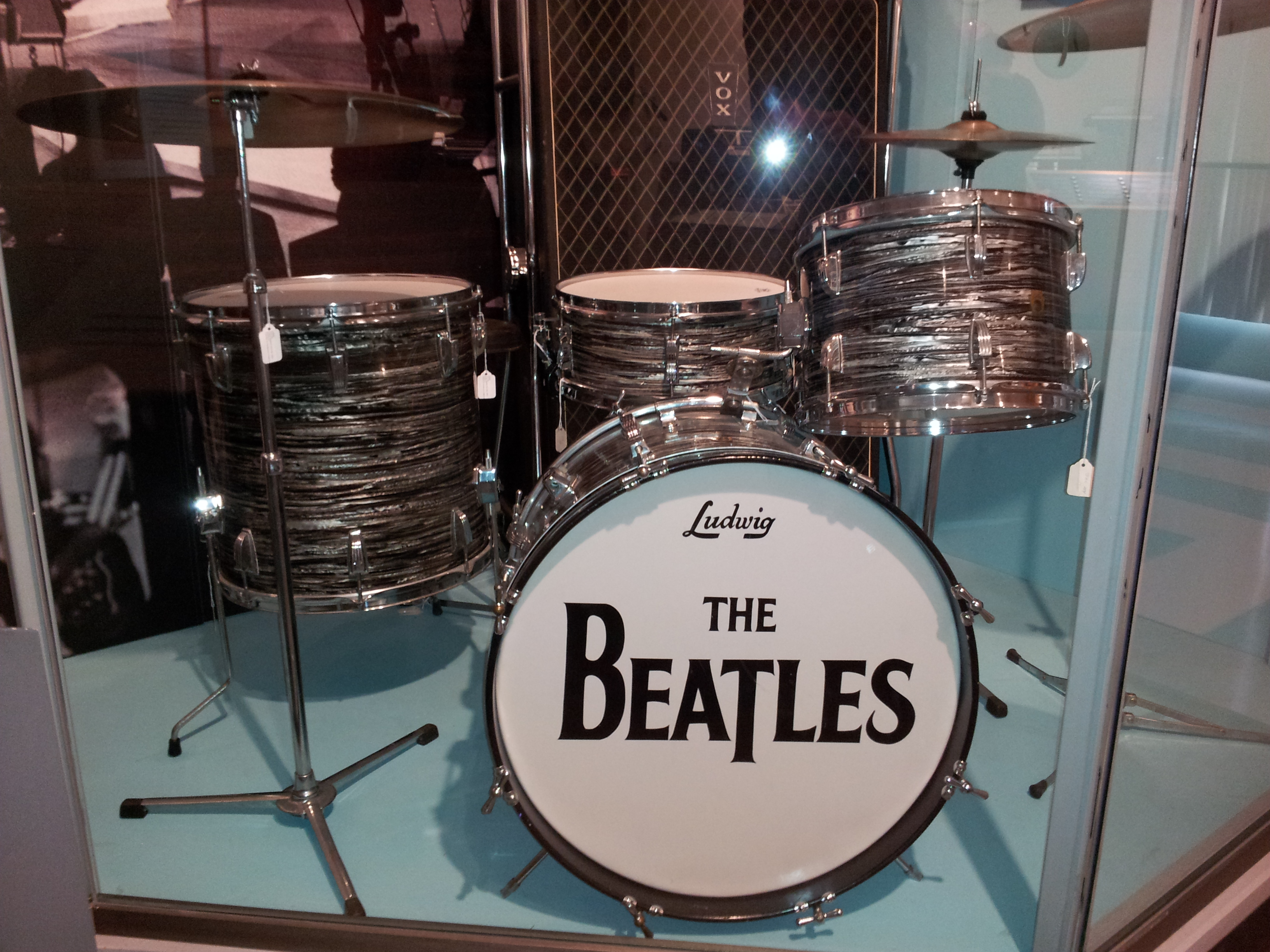
Ludwig drum set, in Black Oyster Pearl, used by Ringo Starr with The Beatles.

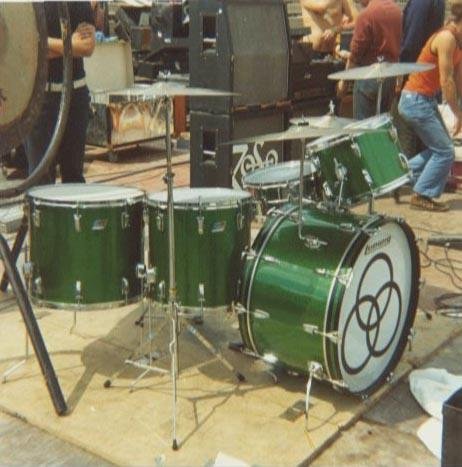
Five-piece Ludwig drum set, in Green Sparkle, as used by John Bonham of Led Zeppelin.

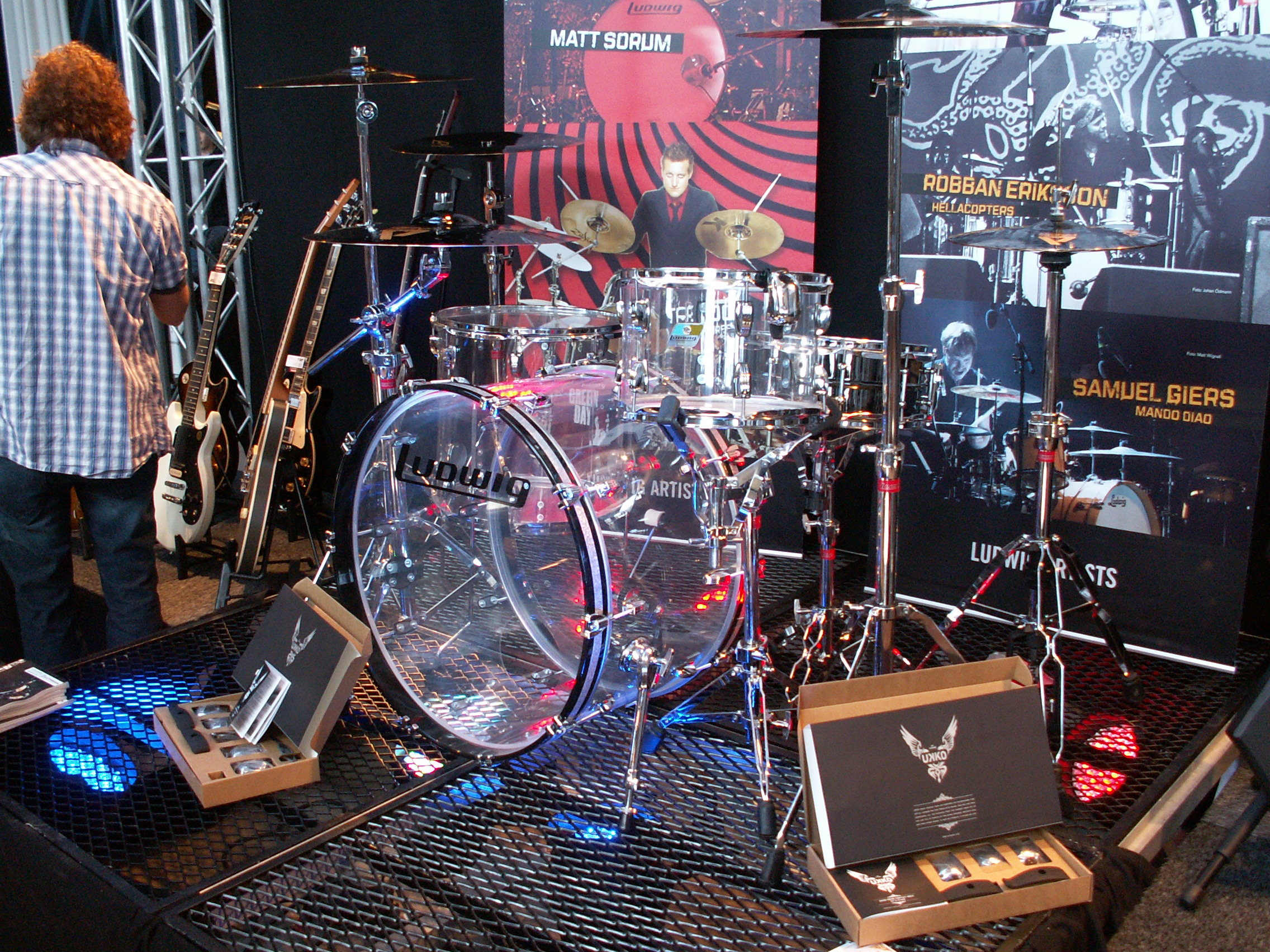
Ludwig Vistalite drum set

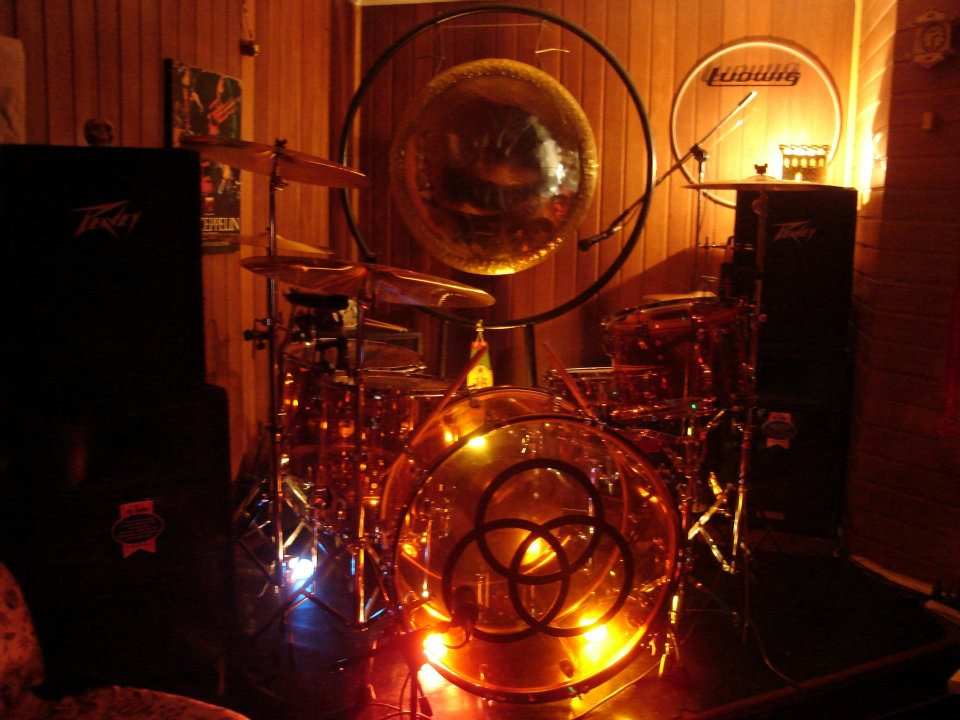
Ludwig Vistalite drum set in Amber

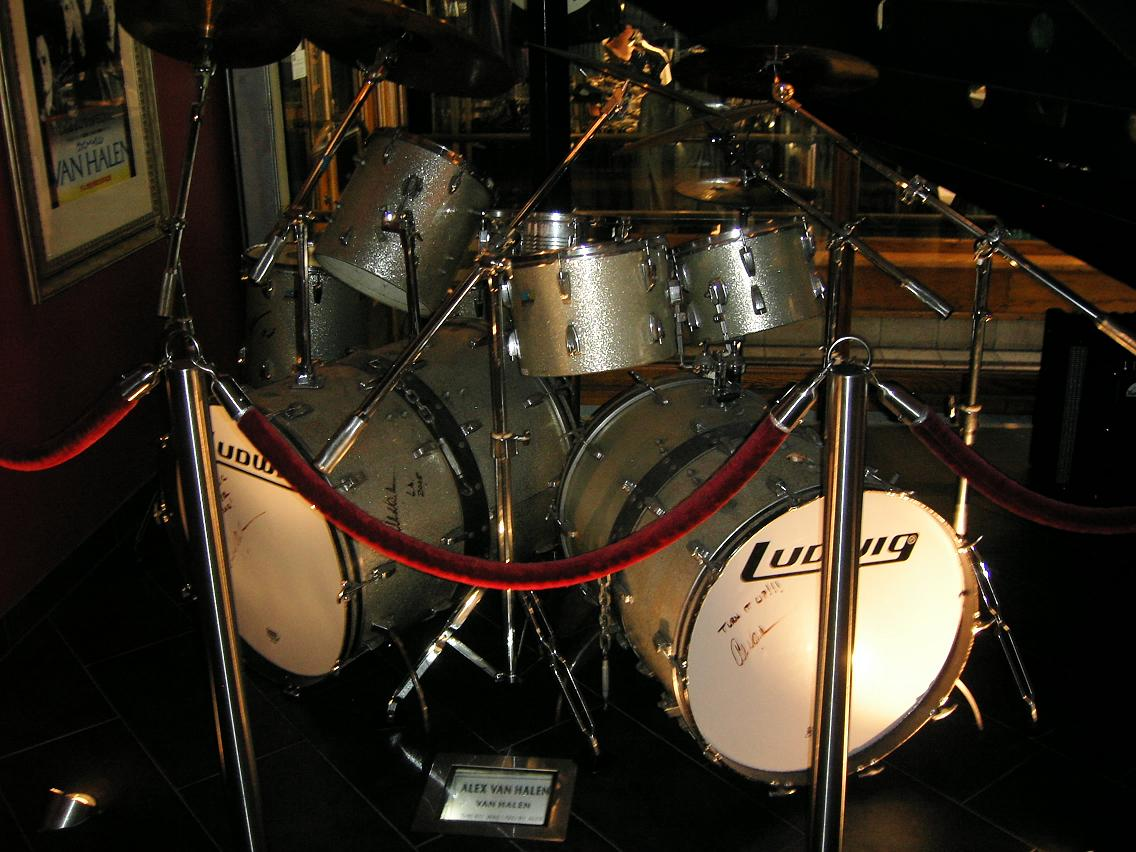
Ludwig drum set used by Alex Van Halen

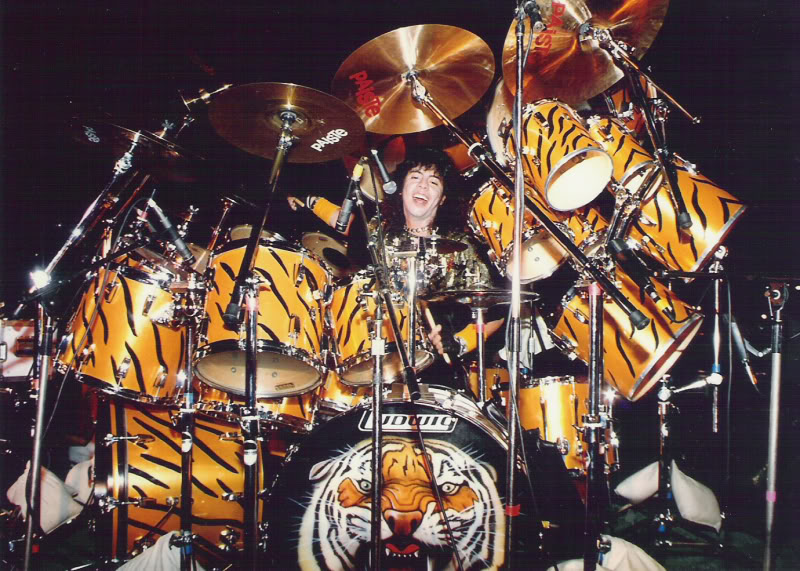
114 piece Guinness Book of World Records Ludwig drum set used by Luis Cardenas with Renegade.

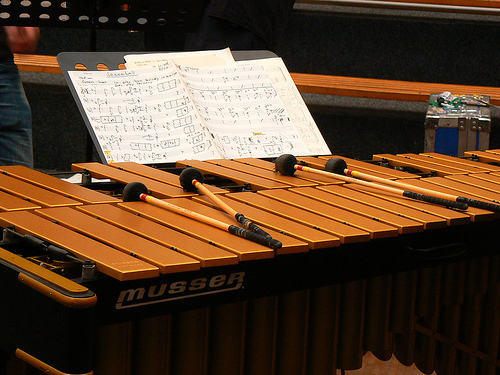
Musser vibraphone (photo taken in 2007)

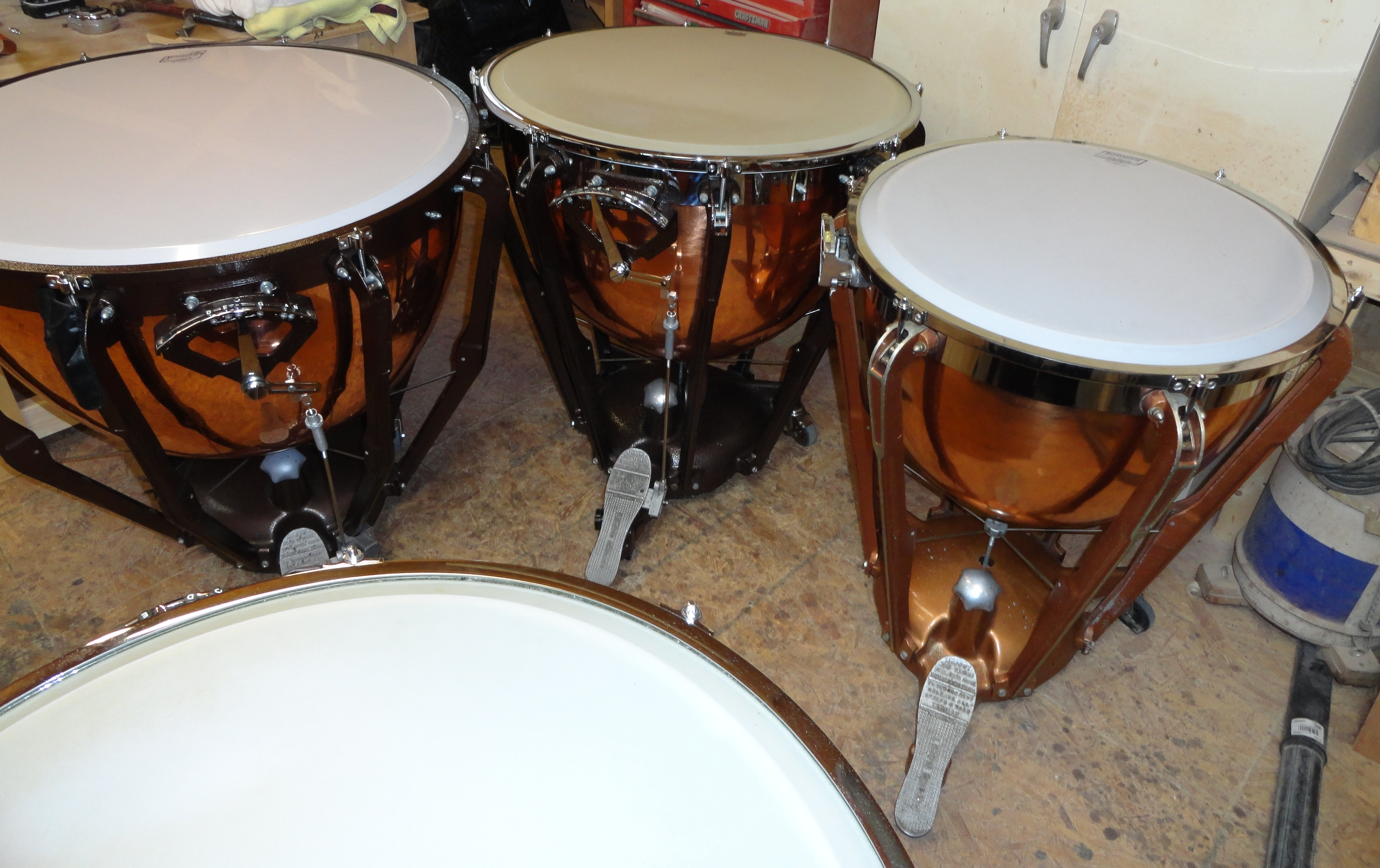
Ludwig timpani (photo taken in 2015)
