= Emrick =

Emrick is both a surname and a given name. Notable people with the name include:

== Surname ==
- Joe Emrick (born 1970), American politician
- Mike Emrick (born 1946), American sports commentator
- Paul Spotts Emrick (1884–1965), American marching band director

== Given name ==
- Emrick Fotsing (born 2007), Canadian soccer player
- Doris Emrick Lee (1905–1983), American painter
- George Emrick Harris (1827–1911), American politician
- Keller Emrick Rockey (1888–1970), United States Marine Corps general

== Fictional characters ==
- Julie Emrick, a character in the television series Felicity

== See also ==
- Demrick
- Emerick
- Eric
