= University of Chicago Band =

College marching band

The University of Chicago Band
- School: The University of Chicago
- Location: Chicago, IL
- Conference: UAA
- Founded: 1898
- Director: Katherine Demartini
- Assistant Director: Zachary Grelewicz
- Members: 18
- Fight song: "Wave The Flag"

The University of Chicago Band is a pep band and a marching band (of the scramble band variety) for the University of Chicago. The Band was founded in 1898, five years after the university opened.

== History ==
University President William Rainey Harper organized the group in Autumn 1898. The band's first concert was held on December 16, 1898, in an auditorium in Kent Hall.

Amos Alonzo Stagg, football coach and head of the Athletic Department at the time, was eager for a band to support his teams. He incorporated the band into the Athletic Department and provided it with a budget for travel, equipment, and uniforms. The uniforms consisted of maroon sweaters and ties with white shirts and trousers. In cold weather, the bandsmen also wore overcoats and caps.

The band's original primary purpose was to support the football team in their matchups against other Midwestern and East Coast universities. Typical opponents of the time included such schools as Michigan, Wisconsin, Minnesota, Northwestern, and other universities known today as football powerhouses. In fact, the University of Chicago has a perfect 4–0 record against Notre Dame in football; the most recent matchup between the two schools took place in 1899.

The Band was originally called the UC Military Band, although it had no affiliation with any form of the Armed Forces at that time. However, during World War I, almost every male member of the band enlisted in some branch of the federal service. The band lived up to its name during World War II when it became a color guard military band.

With a fluctuating membership of 50 to 100 musicians, the band performed field maneuvers in the classic Big Ten style, spelling out letters and words as wells as forming pictures. However, it added its own zany twist to shows with balloons, confetti, and singing along with the more traditional elements of its performance.

The band performed at all home football games at Stagg Field, which stood on the current site of the Regenstein Library. It also travelled to at least one road game each year. In addition to performances at football games, basketball games, and other athletic events, the band put on concerts on a regular basis in Mandel Hall.

For many years, the band possessed permanent rehearsal and storage space underneath the stands of Stagg Field. In 1941 the band moved to new quarters in the basement of the Music Building at 5727 S. University Ave., currently called the Statistics and Mathematics Building.

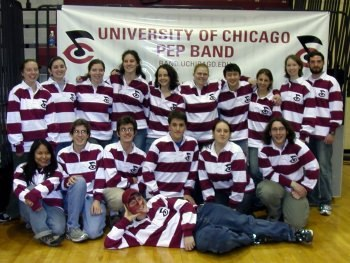
The University of Chicago Band

The UC Band's fate took a dramatic turn in 1939 when the university cancelled intercollegiate football. However, the organization survived as a concert band for several more years. It seems to have disappeared entirely sometime during World War II. The group reappeared in 1953 as a basketball band. Since then, the band has gone through several periods of activity and inactivity.

The band has had a number of directors throughout its history. The most famous was Harold Bachman, a nationally renowned band leader, who served from 1935 until the band's demise sometime in the early 1940s. The current pep band does not have a professional director. Student members take the responsibility for musical and administrative leadership. The band continues to perform regularly at intercollegiate matches in football, men's basketball, and women's basketball.

=== Big Bertha ===
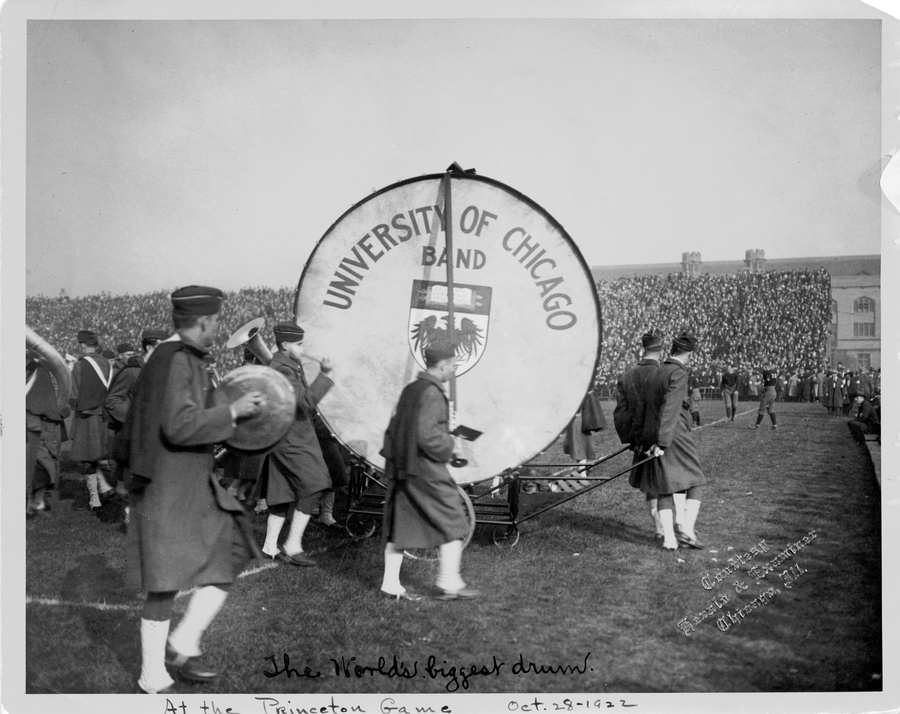
The University of Chicago Band With Big Bertha

The band's most notable and memorable feature was its bass drum. Known as Big Bertha, the drum measured eight feet in diameter and required a crew of six members, four to push the drum and two to beat it. After Purdue University brought its own large bass drum to a 1921 Chicago-Purdue football game, Big Bertha was donated in 1922 by C. D. Greenleaf, the president of C. G. Conn Company, a well-known manufacturer of instruments in Indiana. Greenleaf was a Chicago alumnus and an original member of the band. Along with the drum, he gave 100 instruments to the band, each bearing an engraved copy of the university seal. Big Bertha was so large that it could not fit through the doors of Mandel Hall; thus it could not be used during the band's indoor concerts.

The drum rested on a cart supported on airplane tires. Mr. Greenleaf sent a representative to the Chicago stockyards to select the largest steers found in the Chicago Stockyards, and had the drum built around drumheads made from their hides.

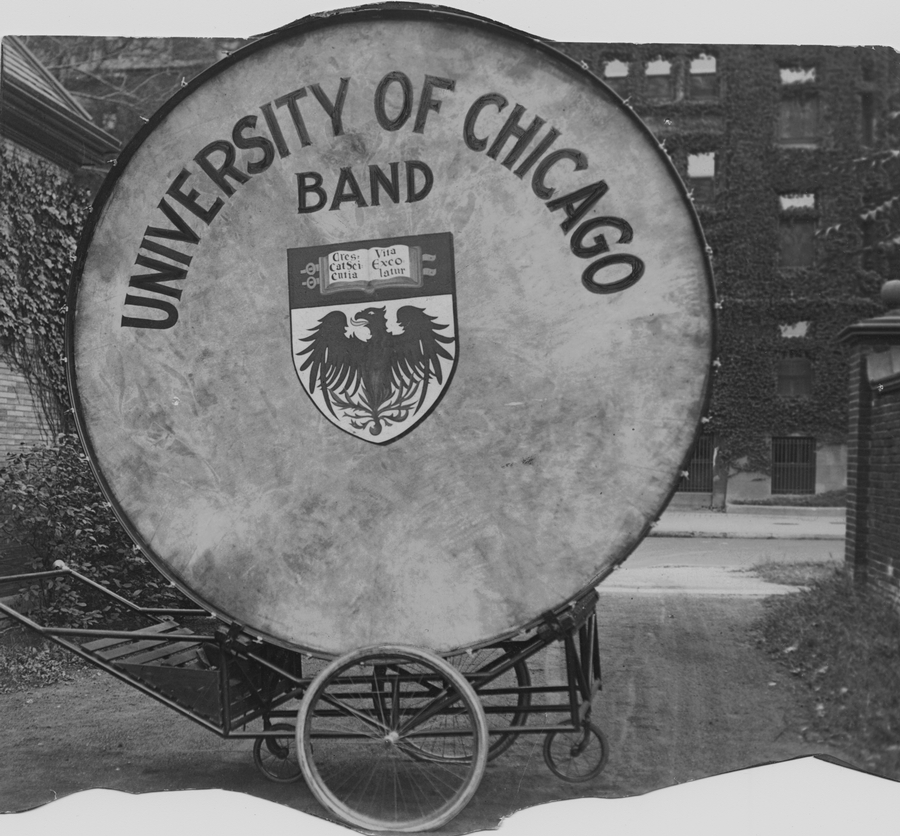
Close up of Big Bertha

When the university canceled intercollegiate football in 1939, Big Bertha went into seclusion for a number of years. It was hidden underneath Stagg Field, the old football stadium. Since the first nuclear reactor occurred under the stadium, Big Bertha later became contaminated by radiation from the atomic bomb research during the 1940s. Big Bertha came out of seclusion when a movie about the life of the great John Philip Sousa was to be made and was offered a role in the film, "Stars and Stripes."

In 1955, Colonel D. Harold Byrd, a long-time benefactor of the Longhorn Band, purchased Bertha from the University of Chicago and gave it a new home in the heart of Texas. Mr. Moton Crockett, former Director of the Longhorn Band, constructed a special trailer for the storage and transportation. The permanent dwelling is in the comfort of the University of Texas at Austin's large Band Hall. Big Bertha is currently owned and was formerly used by The University of Texas Longhorn Band until it was retired in 2022 after a hundred years of service.

== See also ==
- Chicago Maroons
- Chicago Maroons football
