= L&S =

L&S may refer to:

- L&S, commonly known as Leedy & Strupe, a company formed after the purchase of the Leedy Manufacturing Company
- Laverne & Shirley, an American television situation comedy
- Lilo & Stitch (franchise), a Disney franchise
  - Lilo & Stitch, a 2002 animated film and the first film in the franchise
  - Lilo & Stitch (2025 film), a live-action and CGI reimagining of the 2002 film
  - Lilo Pelekai and Stitch (Lilo & Stitch), the title character duo of the franchise
- the Lehigh and Susquehanna Railroad, a defunct railroad in Pennsylvania
- A Latin Dictionary, often referred to as "Lewis and Short"
- Lucas & Steve, a Dutch EDM duo
