= Frank Erwin Center =

Arena in Texas, United States

- The Drum

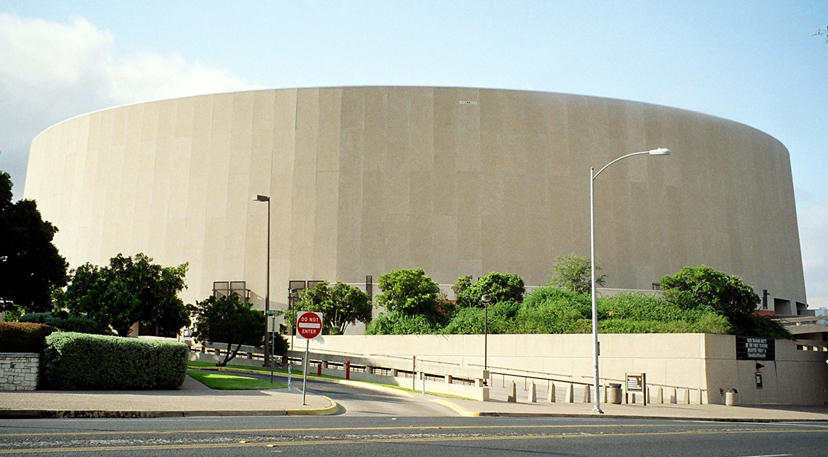
- Interactive map of Frank Erwin Center
- Full name: Frank C. Erwin Jr. Special Events Center
- Former names: Special Events Center (1977–1980)
- Address: 1701 Red River Street
- Location: Austin, Texas
- Coordinates: 30.2770°N 97.7322°W
- Owner: University of Texas at Austin
- Operator: University of Texas at Austin
- Capacity: 17,900 (center stage) (concert); 16,540 (basketball, 2013–2022); 7,820 (theatre)
- Surface: Terrazzo floor/portable basketball floor/portable turf
- Record attendance: John Denver 17,829

Construction
- Groundbreaking: August 1974
- Opened: November 29, 1977
- Renovated: 2001
- Expanded: 2003
- Closed: May 21, 2022
- Demolished: November 2023 – May 19, 2024
- Cost: $34 million (original) ($181 million in 2025 dollars) $55 million (renovations/expansion)
- Architects: Wilson, Crain & Anderson Heery International (renovations/expansion)
- Structural engineer: Walter P Moore
- General contractor: H.A. Lott Inc.

Tenants
- Texas Longhorns men's and women's basketball (1977–2022); Austin Wranglers (AFL/AF2) (2004–2008)

The Frank C. Erwin Jr. Center (originally Special Events Center) was a multi-purpose arena located on the campus of the University of Texas at Austin in Austin, Texas. It was also sometimes referred to as "The Drum" or "The Superdrum", owing to its round, drum-like appearance from outside (not to be confused with Big Bertha, the large bass drum used by the University of Texas marching band).

The multi-purpose facility hosted entertainment events and was the home court for the Texas Longhorns men's and women's basketball programs until 2022, when it was replaced by the Moody Center. The Erwin Center was located at the southeastern corner of the UT central campus and was bounded on the east by Interstate 35.

== History ==
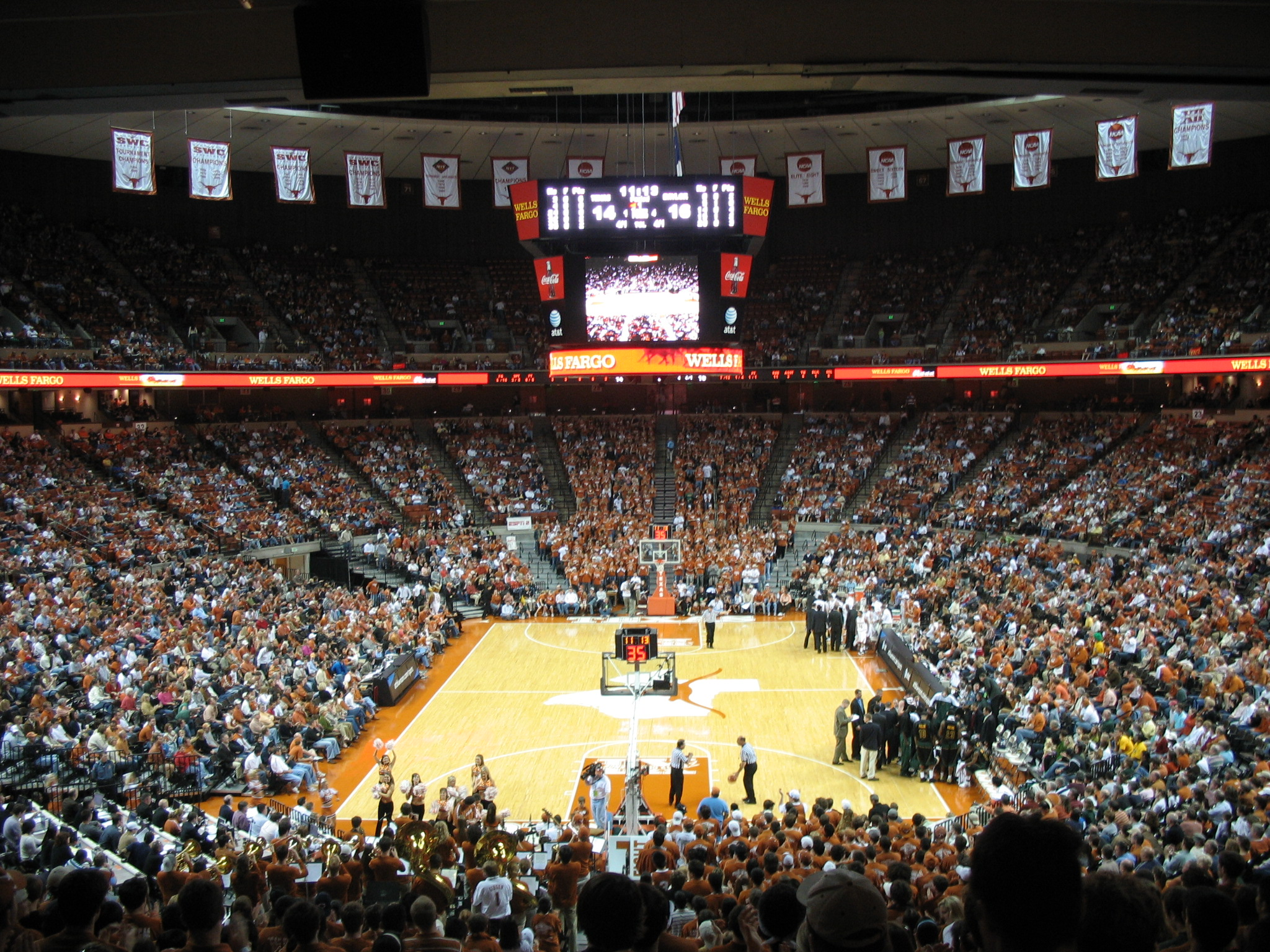
Frank Erwin Center during a basketball game

Built to replace Gregory Gymnasium as the men's and women's basketball teams' home arena, the Special Events Center was completed in 1977 for a total cost of $34 million. The Texas men's basketball team opened the events center on November 29, 1977, with an 83–76 victory over the Oklahoma Sooners. UT undertook extensive renovations of the facility from 2001 to 2003 at a cost of $55 million, adding, among other things, new and renovated seating, new video and sound systems, new lighting, and 28 suites.

The building was named for former UT Board of Regents member Frank Erwin, who as a regent was very controversial due to his hostility towards the burgeoning on-campus, political counterculture movement of the late 1960s and was directly involved in the arrest of protesting students and the purging of what he deemed as "unpatriotic" faculty. Originally known as the Special Events Center, the facility was renamed in 1980 to honor Erwin, who died that same year.

A two-level layout (the lower arena and upper mezzanine) accommodated up to 16,540 spectators for basketball games and up to 17,900 spectators for concerts. The inner ring of the arena averaged around 20 rows deep, while the mezzanine is slightly deeper at around 24 rows. The size of the arena's inner ring was highly dependent on the event being hosted.

=== Replacement and demolition ===
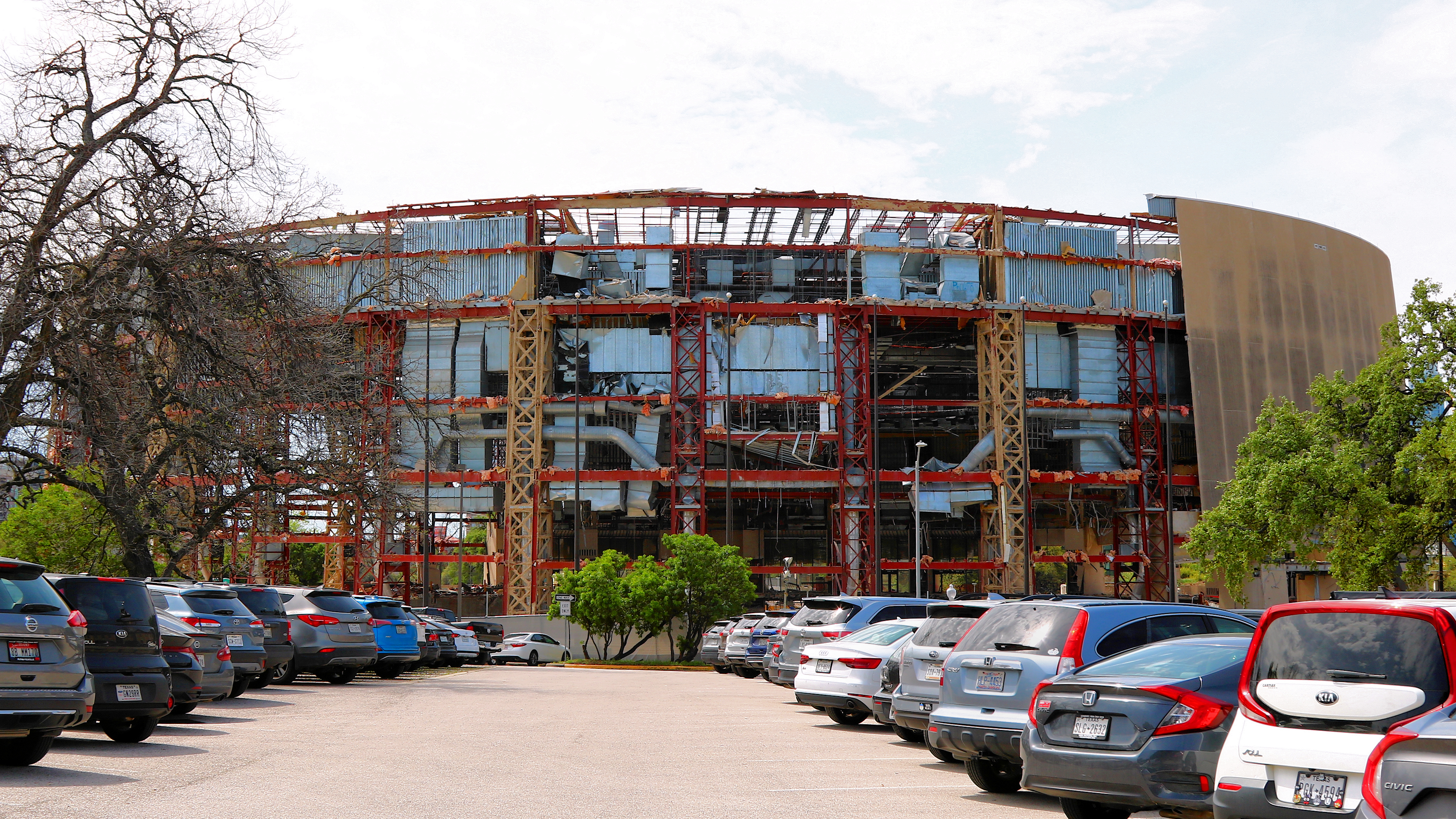
The Frank Erwin Center being demolished.

In 2013, the Dell Medical Center, a $334 million teaching hospital for the university, identified the Erwin Center parking lot and the Waller Creek area directly across from the Center as being the site of Phase I of the Dell Center's construction, with the completion of following phases to require the demolition of the Erwin Center.

In 2018, the University of Texas and the Oak View Group announced that they had agreed to build a new arena for the Texas Longhorns basketball programs, at a cost of $338 million; the new facility would fill the role that had been played by the Frank Erwin Center. The new arena is the Moody Center, named after the Moody Foundation, which had donated $130 million to University of Texas athletic programs. A groundbreaking ceremony for the construction of Moody Arena was held on the UT campus, just south of Mike A. Myers Soccer Stadium, on December 3, 2019; the new arena was completed in 2022. The Erwin Center hosted its last ticketed event on April 2, 2022; it was a basketball game which featured the Harlem Globetrotters. The newly completed Moody Center opened on April 20, 2022. The final UT graduation ceremonies to take place at the Erwin Center were held on May 20–21, 2022; they were the Erwin Center's last scheduled events.

A year after the closure of the Erwin Center, the UT System Board of Regents unveiled plans for the structure's demolition. The announcement was made on May 1, 2023, and the demolition process began during the following November. The Erwin Center was dismantled in phases, to preserve nearby structures and to facilitate the recycling of materials. The last remaining building supports came down on May 19, 2024, officially marking the end of the Erwin Center with the land to be cleared out completely by September.

== Events ==
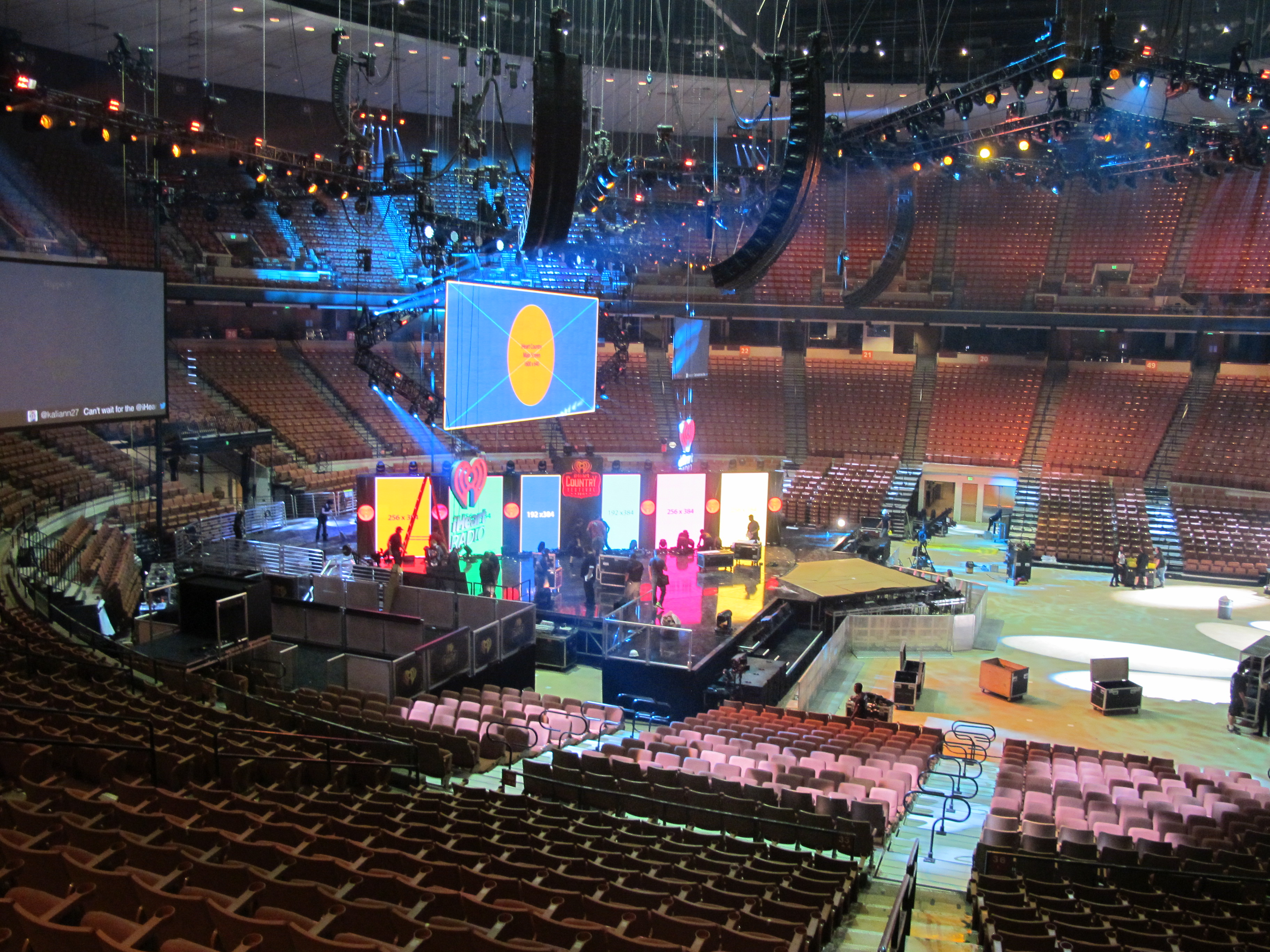
The Frank Erwin Center set up for a concert.

Located adjacent to downtown Austin, The Erwin Center was generally accepted to be Austin's premier venue for large public and private events. The center held many events such as concerts, professional wrestling events, bull riding and private banquets.

The arena has hosted three UFC mixed martial events: UFC Fight Night: Marquardt vs. Palhares in 2010, UFC Fight Night: Edgar vs. Swanson in 2014, and UFC Fight Night: Cowboy vs. Medeiros in 2018. Legendary professional boxer Miguel Cotto of Puerto Rico had his debut fight there, knocking out Jason Doucet in the first round of a boxing show headlined by a fight between Mexican Jesus Chavez and American Tom Johnson, contest won by Chavez by an eighth-round knockout on February 23, 2001.

Music artists such as Taylor Swift, David Bowie, Tina Turner, Lana Del Rey, Ariana Grande, KISS, U2, Bon Jovi, Pearl Jam, Paul McCartney, Def Leppard, George Strait, Garth Brooks, Van Halen, Rush, AC/DC, Pink Floyd, Prince, Guns N' Roses, Rod Stewart, Madonna, Whitney Houston, Radiohead, Kanye West, Lady Gaga, Miley Cyrus and many others have performed at the arena.

The Erwin Center hosted the semifinals and finals of the University Interscholastic League boys' and girls' basketball playoffs in all five classifications until 2015, when the playoffs moved to San Antonio.

The arena also hosted both UT commencement ceremonies and various local high school graduations.

== Basketball attendance record ==
Texas Men's Basketball
#	Date	Opponent	Attendance
1	February 28, 2004	Texas Tech	16,837 (Sold out again on February 19, 2022, with a reduced capacity of 16,540 for the last several years)
1	January 13, 2004	Wake Forest	16,837
3	February 21, 2009	Oklahoma	16,755
3	January 24, 2009	Texas A&M	16,755
3	December 4, 2008	UCLA	16,755
3	February 18, 2008	Texas A&M	16,755
3	February 11, 2008	Kansas	16,755
3	January 26, 2008	Texas Tech	16,755
3	January 19, 2008	Colorado	16,755
3	February 28, 2007	Texas A&M	16,755
3	February 25, 2006	Kansas	16,755
3	January 14, 2006	Villanova	16,755
3	January 17, 2005	Oklahoma State	16,755
All games considered a sellout

Texas Women's Basketball
#	Date	Opponent	Attendance
1	March 27, 1987	Louisiana Tech*	15,303
2	January 22, 1988	Mississippi	14,413
3	February 24, 1996	Texas Tech	14,115
4	February 25, 1995	Texas Tech	13,378
5	November 18, 1987	Soviet National Team	13,358
6	March 25, 1989	Maryland #	12,874
7	February 9, 1991	Arkansas	12,531
8	March 5, 2022	Oklahoma State	12,506
9	February 1, 2004	Texas Tech	12,474
10	March 24, 1990	Louisiana Tech #	12,390
11	January 22, 1994	Texas Tech	12,352
12	March 26, 1988	Louisiana Tech #	12,288
13	January 15, 2018	Uconn	11,877
14	February 21, 1989	TCU	11,769
15	February 9, 1994	Texas A&M	11,646
16	January 17, 1989	Western Kentucky	11,619
* NCAA Final Four # NCAA Midwest Regional

== See also ==
- List of NCAA Division I basketball arenas
