= List of Shipping Wars episodes =

The following is a list of episodes of the A&E reality television series Shipping Wars.

== Series overview ==
Season	Episodes	Originally released	
Season	Episodes	First released	Last released
1	10	January 10, 2012	February 7, 2012
2	14	August 7, 2012	October 2, 2012
3	12	December 12, 2012	January 30, 2013
4	12	June 11, 2013	July 30, 2013
5	12	December 3, 2013	January 14, 2014
6	20	June 3, 2014	August 5, 2014
7	14	November 18, 2014	March 3, 2015
8	6	April 1, 2015	April 29, 2015
9	16	November 30, 2021	January 25, 2022

== Episodes ==
=== Season 1 (2012) ===
No. overall	No. in season	Title	Original release date	Prod. code	Viewers (millions)
1	1	"Pilot"	January 10, 2012	101 / 01	3.084
The transporters compete for some unique shipments going cross-country as a 4,000 lbs., 22-foot steel horse and an oversized 7-foot-long Venus Flytrap come up for bid. Roy Garber and Jarrett Joyce are the big winners of the transports, respectively, but there's no time to celebrate when they both realize they may have bitten off more than they can chew. If the steel horse doesn't arrive on time, Roy will lose half his pay. Meanwhile, the Venus Flytrap is on a deadline for the opening night of the "Little Shop of Horrors" premiere. If Jarrett doesn't deliver the oversized prop on time, then the show doesn't happen. The stakes are high as they race to make sure their loads arrive intact and on time. One mistake and these loads could be their last.
2	2	"Double Down and Bean Town"	January 10, 2012	102 / 02	2.957
When shipments hit the auction block, the Bawcoms score a shipment for a 35 foot freshwater boat while Roy gets stuck transporting an old English phone booth after he tries to teach Jarrett a lesson.
3	3	"Bullship"	January 17, 2012	104 / 04	2.272
When livestock hits the uShip auction, Jennifer makes her move and wins a haul of two bucking bulls, while Marc gets a fragile experimental aircraft. When this experienced cowgirl picks up the bulls, she finds them meaner than she expected.
4	4	"Cash for Tanks"	January 17, 2012	103 / 03	2.435
After Marc battles it our with the other transporters, he wins a load of two Military tanks headed across the country and Roy lands a mint condition Model A being shipped from one collector to another. After Marc quickly loads up the tanks, he's got to find his way through a maze of round-a-bouts in a small Pennsylvania town before he even makes it to the highway. Roy has to make this delivery and get back home in time for his son's graduation, but when he's caught up in one of the worst storms in history, will he damage the load and find himself out of pocket for this priceless antique?
5	5	"Pain in the Caboose"	January 24, 2012	105 / 05	2.587
When it comes to the biggest and baddest loads, Marc can't help but throw his hat in the ring. Fighting off Scott and Susie, he lands the job hauling a 1928 train caboose. When he arrives, Marc finds more of a remodel project than a shipment, and has to get to work right away. Pushing the limits, this load could make him a small fortune, or sink his ship before he makes it across the country. When Roy wins the privilege to ship a pristine condition 1955 Ford Thunderbird, he's sure it'll be an easy run. But when he arrives to pick up the vintage automobile, it's the neighbors who give him more grief than he's paid for.
6	6	"Camel in Tow"	January 24, 2012	106 / 06	2.396
Jennifer uses her experience transporting livestock to win a camel shipment from Oklahoma to Vermont. Between getting lost, stopping to keep her cargo fed, and cleaning up the camel spit, Jennifer gets way behind schedule. But when her truck breaks down mid-run, the whole shipment is jeopardized. Marc gets to haul a $150,000 landing craft from coast to coast, but when he picks up a side load for some extra cash, he risks damaging his anchor load and his pocket book at the same time.
7	7	"Tavern on the Greenbacks"	January 31, 2012	107 / 07	2.175
Roy heads to New York City when he outbids the other transporters for a job moving a catering food truck from the city's famous restaurant, Tavern on the Green. Jarrett picks up a 400-lb wooden African sculpture.
8	8	"Jennifer's Arch"	January 31, 2012	108 / 08	2.393
Jennifer may have taken her livestock specialty too far when she tops the transporters in an auction to ship a number of small animals. Between the smell, the constant feedings, and the never-ending squeals, it may be the last run Jennifer makes with so many critters. Jarrett outbids Marc in the competition to haul a go-kart in the shape of a miniature semi-tractor trailer. Moving it up the coast, he must deliver the tiny automobile in time for a local Shriner event, which will feature an entire fleet of mini semis turned go-karts. But when his van breaks down once again, it may be the last straw for this rookie's unreliable transportation.
9	9	"Baja or Bust"	February 7, 2012	109 / 09	1.919
Marc is headed to Mexico when he wins an auction to ship a $100,000 Baja 1000 Trophy Truck. Leaving from Colorado, Marc must protect his precious cargo, and make sure it arrives without delay in time for the start of the famous race. But when he gets lost on the small back roads in Tijuana, Marc must get resourceful or risk putting the race team, and his career, in last place. Scott and Susie take their boat hauling knowledge to a whole new level when they transport a wooden pirate ship across the southwest. But as they put the miles behind them, the fragile pirate ship gets more and more difficult to keep tied down.
10	10	"May the Ship be With You"	February 7, 2012	110 / 10	1.946
Roy hauls props from a science-fiction film; Jennifer must quickly transport 20 peafowl to Arizona.

=== Season 2 (2012) ===
No. overall	No. in season	Title	Original release date	Prod. code	Viewers (millions)
11	1	"Two Halves of the Same Willie"	August 7, 2012	202 / 12	1.862
"Handyman" Roy gets in a heap of trouble after he saws a giant Willie Mays sculpture in half while "Cowgirl" Jennifer deals with a sobbing customer who is sad to see his prized possession go.
12	2	"The King and His Axe"	August 7, 2012	203 / 13	2.011
Chris and Robbie move two pieces of music history; Jarrett is burdened by a heavy load.
13	3	"Love at First Flight"	August 14, 2012	204 / 14	1.529
Jennifer is saddled with a depression-prone parrot; Roy's truck breaks down.
14	4	"One Crystal Short of a Geode"	August 14, 2012	201 / 11	1.970
"Big Rig" driver, Marc Springer, gets more than he bargained for when he comes toe to toe with an irate customer. "Rookie" Jarrett manages to barely pass a customer inspection after delivering two unique sculptures to a museum.
15	5	"Chicken Ship"	August 21, 2012	206 / 16	1.666
Marc runs into some bad weather that takes a toll on an exposed, custom-built hot rod. Jarrett just barely squeezes three chicken coops into his trailer.
16	6	"From Sphere to Infinity & Beyond"	August 21, 2012	205 / 15	1.952
Roy makes a delivery to a boy who recently lost his father; Chris and Robbie get pulled over.
17	7	"Mud Bug Boogie"	August 28, 2012	207 / 17	1.940
Marc encounters a hailstorm as he hauls a trolley bus; Jennifer transports crawfish to a restaurant.
18	8	"Not with a Whimper but a Bang"	August 28, 2012	208 / 18	2.043
"The Hotshot Couple" catch a bad flu en route to the pickup of a state-of-the-art nuclear bomb shelter and Chris butts heads with the seller on the loading of the oversized bunker. Jarrett wins his most expensive load of his career--an Indy 500 racecar. But Jarrett's big payday on the $675,000 car will only happen if he makes it across country in four days.
19	9	"Planes, Pains, and a Spire of Flames"	September 11, 2012	209 / 19	1.722
Jennifer troubleshoots the biggest load of her career--a Mini Max Airplane--that tests her patience. Marc doesn't have a minute to spare or he'll suffer huge consequences with this high dollar load.
20	10	"Flux Capacity"	September 11, 2012	210 / 20	1.784
Roy's truck comes to a screeching halt when it breaks down for the last time while Jarrett delivers a $150,000 restored Delorean to a nit-picking customer.
21	11	"Wheels of Misfortune"	September 18, 2012	211 / 21	1.837
Jarrett endures the worst load of his career with a carriage too large for his trailer while Jennifer must hire out help to assist with the loading of a carnival ride.
22	12	"Wings, A Prayer and a Know-It-All"	September 18, 2012	212 / 22	1.821
Chris and Robbie do their first "motherload" -- a vintage DC-7 Airplane -- while Roy helps a community to rebuild their homes after the devastating Bastrop, Texas fires.
23	13	"Big Idea, Bad Idea"	October 2, 2012	213 / 23	1.630
Chris and Robbie haul an enormous spider to an amusement park with a strict delivery schedule. The precariously positioned arachnid requires reinforcements to ensure its safety, putting the young couple to work. Roy moves the largest cargo of his career with a 42- foot water tower. Upon his arrival, however, Roy finds his plan for loading won't work and he must improvise.
24	14	"Cruisin' for a Bruisin'"	October 2, 2012	214 / 24	1.487
Jennifer has two days to get a six-layer wedding cake to a reception completely intact. After picking up a Bozo the Clown arcade game, she books it to get to the wedding in time, but when she arrives, the pastry chefs do not like what they see. Marc wins a bid to ship a super sized vintage bus and attempts to keep it from inching off the trailer en route. Precariously affixed atop the extra long trailer, Marc finds himself in a pickle with a stop at the DOT inspection station.

=== Season 3 (2012–13) ===
No. overall	No. in season	Title	Original release date	Prod. code	Viewers (millions)
25	1	"More Bullship"	December 12, 2012	302 / 26	1.732
"Cowgirl" Jennifer must call Roy in for help with some wild bucking bulls. Chris and Robbie bust their trailer with an overweight houseboat. Jennifer gets asked to take six more bulls than the three she originally bid on, so she calls on Roy to come and help. Once Roy arrives on the scene, he takes over handling the deadly bulls and steals her thunder, upsetting her to the point of tears. Chris and Robbie load an oversized houseboat when it crushes their trailer to the ground. After working in the heat and steam of Alabama all day, they finally call it quits and decide it's a wash, leaving the customer high and dry and very disappointed.
26	2	"Safari So Good"	December 12, 2012	301 / 25	1.721
Marc goes up against an unrealistic deadline when his truck gives out and Jarrett panics when he is stopped for transporting stolen property. Marc explodes from the pressures of another tight deadline, a long drive and a tricky load with a kinetic sculpture, called the Hand of Man. Marc runs himself into the ground to get to LA for an event when, just 30 miles away, Marc's truck stops dead in its tracks. Jarrett hauls a large, creepy taxidermy load when he is stopped by law enforcement for transporting stolen property.
27	3	"Return to Send-Arrrggghhh!"	December 19, 2012	304 / 28	1.840
Chris and Robbie play Robin Hood when delivering some faulty children's toys back to the manufacturer. Roy shows off his daredevil skills and then must fight through a knee injury to deliver a cumbersome, human sized wooden hamster wheel.
28	4	"Geometrically Challenged"	December 19, 2012	303 / 27	1.800
Jennifer picks up a small racing boat in California and has a series of bad experiences that brings her to tears before she even crosses the state line. Jarrett digs himself into a financial hole after some bad measurements.
29	5	"The Carney Code"	December 26, 2012	305 / 29	1.593
Jarrett questions his ability to ship a very rare electric sports car cross country alongside a precariously-placed hunk of metal. Marc's attention to safety brings his run to a screeching halt when he finds the trailers he's hauling are a serious road hazard.
30	6	"Frankenship Horrors"	January 9, 2013	306 / 30	2.077
Chris and Robbie win a creepy load of horror memorabilia but the real scare comes when the cargo is twice as big as they agreed on. Roy thinks he has plenty of time to haul a trailer full of rare film prints to Austin in time for a movie screening but he's foiled by an overweight trailer and multiple blowouts.
31	7	"Damaged Goods"	January 9, 2013	307 / 31	2.111
Jarrett sinks to a new low in his negotiating skills when he fails to deliver a trailer-load of surfboards on time and the customer demands a discount. Marc takes on a Monster Truck only to find there are no "travel wheels," making the load oversized.
32	8	"Candy, Karma, and Catastrophes"	January 16, 2013	308 / 32	1.742
Roy takes a ride on a submersible boat; Jennifer hauls window displays to a Hollywood candy store.
33	9	"Rock 'Em, Sock 'Em, Ride 'Em, Drop 'Em"	January 16, 2013	309 / 33	1.808
Jarrett fails to impress his customer with his packaging skills of a life size Rock 'em Sock 'em Robots game and then nabs a hot rod casket to make some extra cash. Jennifer races against the clock to ship a pregnant horse overnight before it overheats and loses the baby.
34	10	"The Good, the Bad and the Evel"	January 23, 2013	310 / 34	1.645
Marc re-lives his childhood obsession when he arranges to transport Evel Knievel's original tractor trailer. Robbie brings her young son, Carter, with them when they ship a crooked play house but the fun family affair quickly turns to danger after she encounters problems with her wheels.
35	11	"Wearheads and Gearheads"	January 23, 2013	311 / 35	1.565
Roy, the "Handyman", busts out some serious loading skills for a dining table made from a '57 Chevy and a huge, vintage penny arcade sign. Chris and Robbie pull their heaviest load to date--a giant, ominous-looking, nuclear missile.
36	12	"Tyrannosaurus Hex"	January 30, 2013	312 / 36	1.660
The pressure is on when Jennifer has to help package and transport a model ship, 10 years in the making while Jarrett gets creative to load up a crate of priceless dinosaur fossils 65 million years in the making.

=== Season 4 (2013) ===
No. overall	No. in season	Title	Original release date	Prod. code	Viewers (millions)
37	1	"Monkey Business"	June 11, 2013	403 / 39	1.771
After Jarrett books a load of monkeys, he learns why they say "never work with kids or animals" --while Marc delivers a load for a Vegas magician and we watch more than his patience disappear.
38	2	"Dysfunction Junction"	June 11, 2013	404 / 40	1.464
Chris and Robbie convert one of their rigs to run on veggie oil and end up making a bet with the shipper--beat the tight, cross-country deadline and do it all on free grease. Roy tries to jumpstart his son in the hauling business, but the cab gets cramped when Travis brings along a girlfriend and decades of baggage.
39	3	"Manners Meltdown and Minor Mishaps"	June 18, 2013	401 / 37	1.585
After almost losing his load, Roy's forced to ask Jennifer for help, but gets more than he bargained for when her "favor" turns into etiquette lessons. Jarrett finally gets a new rig, but this maiden voyage might be his last when he hauls some volatile flamethrowers.
40	4	"If the Boat's a Rockin'..."	June 18, 2013	402 / 38	1.624
Marc's on the sidelines with big rig repairs until his buddy joins in the bidding ... but everyone else gets the last laugh when he's forced to rent a box truck. Chris transports a boat by sea, while Robbie drives by land to the drop off, but things get tense when Chris' cute shipmates seem too distracting.
41	5	"A Fairy Tale Disaster"	June 25, 2013	405 / 41	1.744
Chris and Robbie book an easy one day run North of Nashville, but when a bride-to-be insists on coming along, things go just south of hell from there. Jarrett books a load that Roy will take for the second half of the run... if they can find each other.
42	6	"Crypto-Prank-ology"	June 25, 2013	406 / 42	1.861
Marc's buddy, Johnny Chavez finally wins a load, but his day in the sun will be overshadowed when Marc pranks his run. Jennifer hauls a cold, creepy, mysterious load... and that's just the seller, who joins her to ensure the oddity he's shipping makes it to its destination before it unthaws.
43	7	"Broken Down & Busted"	July 2, 2013	407 / 43	1.763
Marc drives a load of 20 something's to the "Big Easy" for Mardi Gras, on a run that proves to be anything but easy. Jarrett chases a load because it brings him near a girl he's fallen for and when he runs late he learns love can be costly.
44	8	"Punch Drunk Love"	July 2, 2013	408 / 44	1.923
Roy books a complicated Linotype machine, and things get really complicated when he thinks he breaks it in route-but with his skill and welder, he hopes to set things right. After breaking down in the middle of nowhere, Jarrett hatches the brilliant plan of secretly booking himself and the load on uShip! He just hopes that when Chris and Robbie show up, they feel the same way.
45	9	"High-Tech Rednecks"	July 9, 2013	409 / 45	1.646
Roy lands a wild load of giant, murderous Animatronic Hillbillies, and he almost turns into one himself when he has to deal with the crazy cat lady involved with his side load of cat caskets. Jennifer transports an antique Honda.
46	10	"Old Man and the Sea Life"	July 16, 2013	410 / 46	1.665
With hopes of upping his game, Jarrett joins Marc to learn the ropes on a big rig run, while newcomers Chelsea and Courtney face the deep sea and their deepest fears as they transport a live shark.
47	11	"Bidder Bee-ware!"	July 23, 2013	411 / 47	1.645
Marc is a bit outnumbered when he transports 4 million angry bees, and turns it into a battle of attrition--Marc surviving the bee stings versus the bees jumping ship. We also meet the Bodens and the transporter couple from New Orleans ends up in a mess, literally, when they haul some pristine and not-so pristine dollhouses.
48	12	"Ready, Set...Pedal!"	July 30, 2013	412 / 48	1.332
Jarrett seemingly faces the seven plagues and more when he hauls a pedal pub and a side load of sod, while it's almost "game over" for Jenn after she books an overwhelming arcade load with her underwhelming trailer.

=== Season 5 (2013–14) ===
No. overall	No. in season	Title	Original release date	Prod. code	Viewers (millions)
49	1	"A Whole Bunch of Cluck-Ups"	December 3, 2013	501 / 49	1.309
Jarrett scrambles to deliver a chicken car on time; Roy cannot properly load a rotted shipment.
50	2	"Buggin' Out"	December 3, 2013	502 / 50	1.275
After challenging Chris that girls can do anything a guy can, Robbie takes over a very macho shipment--and Chris worries their profits might go down for the count. Jennifer moves a load of pricey mannequins through the heartland, and picks up an interesting travelling companion along way.
51	3	"Flight of the Giant Baby Head"	December 10, 2013	504 / 52	1.364
Jennifer takes on a cross-country load of live bugs that require a little more love and attention than she might be willing to give. Marc takes on his daughter as an apprentice, and the two work through their issues as they move a number of Volkswagen buses.
52	4	"Guys and Dolls"	December 10, 2013	503 / 51	1.272
Fate brings Roy back to Austin, Texas--this time to haul a very big (and very odd) sculpture from a peace-loving art collective. Up north, Jarrett brings along his uncle to help move a flight simulator. But will a side load and extra family baggage prove to be more than he bargained for?
53	5	"We Come in Pieces!"	December 17, 2013	505 / 53	1.363
Chris and Robbie awkwardly go where no transporter has gone before when a run brings them in contact with a Star Trek convention and its alien life forms. Meanwhile, Jarrett tries to glean from the past, and what he's learned from the other transporters as he tackles a load of massive pumpkins.
54	6	"Chivalry's Dead...Roy Killed It"	December 17, 2013	506 / 54	1.231
Sparks fly when Roy battles with two customers while transporting their shipments to a Renaissance Faire... and everyone holds their breath as Jenn's entrusted to ship the future of bicycling.
55	7	"Pop, the Tragic Dragon"	December 24, 2013	508 / 56	1.539
Things get blown out of proportion when Chris and Robbie face down a massive balloon dragon shipment, and Marc's in over-his-head when he agrees to haul a giant Whale sculpture made of trash.
56	8	"War of the Roses"	December 24, 2013	507 / 55	1.625
America's longest running music television show is in trouble when Roy wins the bid to move their iconic camera crane, and Marc's in hot water after picking up a hot tub, but it's at the drop off when things really bubble over.
57	9	"Drilling & Probing"	January 7, 2014	557 / 57	1.533
Roy and his buddy Logan find themselves getting down and dirty as they tussle with a young oil baron and his derrick. Meanwhile Jarrett is more lost than ever when his run-in with a safe and its owner ends up out of this world.
58	10	"What Not to Expect When You're Expecting Jarrett"	January 7, 2014	509 / 57	1.530
The customer finds it's "Pack Your Own Load Day" after Jenn is bested by the heat, fatigue, and big expectations--but that fares better than Jarrett where it's "Kill Your Transporter Day" after he almost crashes and burns a Vietnam era helicopter run.
59	11	"Jack Pots & Cheap Shots"	January 14, 2014	511 / 59	1.398
Roy ships the world's largest drum set while Chris and Robbie ship a mobile tattoo parlor.
60	12	"It's My Party & I'll Shoot You If I Want To"	January 14, 2014	514 / 62	1.507
A little girl's birthday dream playhouse, turns into a nightmare when Marc discovers in route, that the house has a squatter. And Roy deals with more security than he bargained for after he lands a top secret government run.

=== Season 6 (2014) ===
No. overall	No. in season	Title	Original release date	Prod. code	Viewers (millions)
61	1	"Giant Pains in the A."	June 3, 2014	602 / 61	N/A
Jarrett deals with his biggest pain in the ass yet after he wins a giant 40-foot colon. Meanwhile it's NO fun and games for Roy when he battles the owner of a giant video game.
62	2	"Who You Gonna Call!?...Not Two Blondes and a Truck"	June 3, 2014	601 / 60	N/A
Roy's patience is tested when he ships an iconic piece of ghostly movie history, while Darwinian Theory is proven when the Two Blondes attempt a load of dinosaurs.
63	3	"Highway to the Stranger Zone"	June 10, 2014	604 / 63	N/A
Things get spirited when Jenn realizes her load of antique dolls come with "passengers", and newcomer Dusty Davie ends up in a dog fight with a Russian era MIG fighter.
64	4	"Three Horses and a Funeral"	June 10, 2014	605 / 64	N/A
After picking up a simple coin operated carousel, Jarrett ends up going in circles when the buyer calls in-route with other loads that need hauling, but double threat Todd and Tamera are almost DOA when their fragile 140 year old horse drawn hearse shows up to the drop off with missing items.
65	5	"Head Today, Gong Tomorrow"	June 17, 2014	606 / 65	N/A
Jenn gets an earful when her pricey load of prayer gongs almost misses their uptight buyer, but when Jarrett's load is delayed by a day he ends up catching hell and a few catcalls handling a side job on the Vegas strip.
66	6	"A Tactical Disaster"	June 17, 2014	607 / 66	N/A
After Jenn attempts to drive a decked-out armored, assault vehicle to its buyer, the ride turns out to be little more than she bargained for. Marc faces a wall of storms as he attempts to deliver the daredevil motorcycle ride -- "Wall of Death."
67	7	"Spaced Invaders"	June 24, 2014	608 / 67	N/A
Marc's run to "far out" Roswell leaves him proud to be from this world, while Todd and Tamera end up needing more than a few quarters to extend their vintage game pod run.
68	8	"I Can't Believe It's Not Better"	June 24, 2014	609 / 68	N/A
Things melt down, when Jenn tackles the dismantling of a butter sculpture in the Texas heat, while Jessica Samko makes her stage debut by running late and ruining a middle school play's dress rehearsal.
69	9	"Perfect Like Roy"	July 1, 2014	610 / 69	N/A
Jenn learns that Roy Garber's "perfect, just like me" was more than a catch-phrase when she's tasked with transporting a load that was once shipped by the legend... and it's a small world meanwhile, as Dusty feels the weight of making the deadline for a steel globe that's set to open a new ball park.
70	10	"Fiberglass, Steel and Iron Wills"	July 1, 2014	611 / 70	N/A
It's a clash of egos when Marc and Jarrett find that both of their shipments are headed to the same drop off. After Jarrett asks Marc for a favor, he discovers that favor turned into the short end of the stick.
71	11	"Hernias and Hissy Fits"	July 8, 2014	612 / 71	N/A
Marc is weighed down by a load that might just be more than the Snortin' Boar can tackle. Meanwhile, Dusty gets stuck hauling some unique art sculptures and learns a few lessons along the way--tape might not fix everything.
72	12	"Punk-Drunk Love"	July 8, 2014	613 / 72	N/A
Jessica signs up to move a half-ton steampunk robot in a single day, but will bad weather turn her load into steamjunk? Todd and Tamera realize that moonshine stills and porcelain plates don't mix well in the back of a trailer.
73	13	"Do No Bodily Harm"	July 15, 2014	614 / 73	N/A
A shipment of medical equipment takes a turn for the weird when Jenn learns her load is a LOT different than expected. Todd and Tamera discover the hardest part of their day is simply escaping the streets of the New York City. Can they keep their eye on the prize or will they lose lots of fans?
74	14	"Hummers and Bummers"	July 15, 2014	615 / 74	N/A
Jarrett, single-handedly almost ruins the west coast art scene when he hauls an odd sculpture to its various photo shoot locations in the Bay area. Meanwhile, on the east coast, Jessica's doing her best to destroy a large piece of Americana.
75	15	"Love Is a Crazy Carnival Ride"	July 22, 2014	617 / 76	N/A
Jessica finds herself asking a LOT of questions after she agrees to transport a seller's loved one named Bruce. Dusty hits the road with a giant cow skull that leaves him crawling through the desert heat.
76	16	"Monsters, Mannequins and Mayhem"	July 22, 2014	616 / 75	N/A
Todd and Tamera take on some Monsters in a move that proves to be anything but cinematic. Meanwhile, Dusty picks up some travelling companions of the strong, silent type. Can any of the transporters make it to their destinations with their sanity intact?
77	17	"To the Moon and Back"	July 29, 2014	618 / 77	N/A
A giant dog toy has Todd and Tamera chasing their tails as they try to navigate trailer issues and engine trouble. Jenn moves heaven and earth to take some small Moon rocks from Houston to Phoenix.
78	18	"Problems Set In Stone"	July 29, 2014	619 / 78	N/A
Marc takes on an antique camper and Dusty transports a sculpture. But when Dusty picks up a side load and Marc makes a rookie mistake, they both find out they've signed on for a whole extra set of problems.
79	19	"Stuck in the Vending Vortex"	August 5, 2014	620 / 79	N/A
Jessica Samko wins a bizarre carnival type attraction, but things go fowl, when she lands a side load of baby swans. Meanwhile, a repurposed vending machine that dispenses relaxation messages is truly put to the test when Jarrett's tasked with hauling the art piece to Chicago.
80	20	"Big Wine & Bigger Pine"	August 5, 2014	621 / 80	N/A
A giant, but simple chair provides some oversized complications for Jarrett when it won't fit down the stairs. Marc lands a cool, cross country booze run, but things go sour once the wine heats up.

=== Season 7 (2014–15) ===
No. overall	No. in season	Title	Original release date	Prod. code	Viewers (millions)
81	1	"Goose Bumps in the Road"	November 18, 2014	701 / 81	N/A
Samko reluctantly teams up with Jenn after Jenn bids way above her weight class. When Jenn isn't completely forthright, Samko threatens to bring this load toppling down. Dusty takes on a pricey flock of geese decoys and struggles to keep them in prime hunting shape.
82	2	"The Silver Whining Playbook"	November 18, 2014	702 / 82	N/A
Dusty's sensitive side is called on when he nets the job of transporting hundreds of live butterflies. Meanwhile, Jarrett confirms he does not have the "Midas touch" -- as his quarter of million-dollar bullion run turns into a fiasco.
83	3	"Mini Golf & Massive Headaches"	November 25, 2014	703 / 83	N/A
After winning a black light putt-putt golf course, Jenn's game is tested when she realizes that for her run, "MINI-golf" is a misnomer. Todd and Tamera are literally in over their heads when rappelling skills are required at their modern art pickup.
84	4	"Smooth Sailin', Rough Ridin'"	November 25, 2014	704 / 84	N/A
Marc is at the helm of relaunching a massive homemade houseboat but the family's history with the boat, and Marc's stormy attitude, threaten to sink the job before it ever reaches water. Meanwhile, Jarrett meets his match when a bizarre load comes with an even crazier traveling companion.
85	5	"Power Rangers & Vampire Dangers"	December 2, 2014	705 / 85	N/A
Jenn won't save the world, but she better make her deadline when she hauls a 16-foot-tall Power Ranger to a child's birthday party. Meanwhile, Todd and Tamera make a draining run to the Big Easy with Vampire items.
86	6	"Big Pigs Fly, Little Pirates Cry"	December 2, 2014	706 / 86	N/A
Jarrett learns the answer to the question, "Where does the world's largest hog sit?" (anywhere it wants), while hauling a shipment of epic proportions. Samko finds herself in a stand off with a father during the move of a kid's handcrafted, pirate-themed playground.
87	7	"It's a Rock-a-Fire Implosion!"	December 9, 2014	707 / 87	N/A
When tasked with hauling the old animatronic band, Rock-A-Fire Explosion, Jenn ends up pulling a Yoko Ono and almost cancels their reunion tour. Meanwhile, newcomer Chris Kikelhan sends everyone running for cover during his inaugural haul of tornado storm shelters.
88	8	"Up in Smoke & Going Broke"	December 9, 2014	708 / 88	N/A
While shipping an 11-foot-tall glass water pipe to the Mile-High City, Marc tries to mellow out after a blown tire threatens to turn this shipment into shards. Samko saddles up to move an entire barn but when the job gets rough, she does everything she can to keep this show pony from turning into horse feathers.
89	9	"Fire and Rescue"	February 10, 2015	709 / 89	N/A
After the delivery of sad family news, Jenn turns to Jarrett to take over an odd shipment; while Dusty uses his typical "charm" to dampen the spirits of a family moving a pair of antique fire engines.
90	10	"Can't See the Sherwood Forest for the Trees"	February 10, 2015	710 / 90	N/A
Todd and Tamera struggle to fly straight after they discover their giant Robin Hood statue load is broken, and Samko is bent to her limits when her massive load of trees is doubled at the pickup.
91	11	"Crying For Your Art"	February 17, 2015	711 / 91	N/A
Jarrett literally drops a one-of-a-kind art piece while trying to take matters into his own hands. Marc shows his "shipping thumb" when he raises and hauls a massive Sculpture Garden.
92	12	"Looney Tunes Blues"	February 17, 2015	712 / 92	N/A
With a pricey load of Looney Tunes memorabilia, Jenn has dreamy thoughts about the single, wealthy client, but reality crashes in when she tangles with a NYC Transit bus; meanwhile Dusty's breaking all sorts of records, along with his back, when he hauls over four tons of vinyl albums.
93	13	"Big Bertha & the Molar Express"	February 24, 2015	713 / 93	N/A
Jenn gives the University of Texas' Marching Band's massive drum, Big Bertha, a beating, while Todd and Tamera face a train wreck of dental proportions when they tackle a massive train replica headed to a dental office.
94	14	"Broken Dolls & Duck Boat Stalls"	March 3, 2015	714 / 94	N/A
In true Jarrett form, he makes his run with fragile, antique Christmas dolls even weirder when he tries to check into a hotel to protect them from the cold; but can a WWII era amphibious "Duck Boat" that survived the Germans, make it through a run with Chris Kikelhan?

=== Season 8 (2015) ===
No. overall	No. in season	Title	Original release date	Prod. code	Viewers (millions)
95	1	"A Tiger Chase and a Tight Place"	April 1, 2015	715 / 95	N/A
Jenn's love of animals takes a mauling when she attempts to tame a run that includes six massive Bengal tigers; meanwhile Marc gets creative with a pick up truck and trailer when he can't deliver his big rig load of Mythological figures into a residential neighborhood.
96	2	"A Disco Robot & Castle Hassle"	April 1, 2015	716 / 96	N/A
After winning a fire-breathing Disco Robot bound for a music festival, Chris Kikelhan soon grows nostalgic for the days of easier runs after he struggles to get it all to fit at the pick up; meanwhile with his Fiberglass castle load, Dusty gets a taste of royalty when the client has some peculiar demands.
97	3	"The Empire Ships Back"	April 8, 2015	717 / 97	N/A
Dusty connects with his inner nerd after booking Star Wars movie memorabilia along with a massive Kung Fu Panda statue, while Samko nearly gets stuck in the past when she's set to haul a famous Pioneer bus that's seen better days, like when it was made 87 years ago.
98	4	"Gumby's 60th Veggie Surprise"	April 15, 2015	718 / 98	N/A
With Todd and Tamera at the helm, Gumby's trip to a 60 year celebration ends up looking more like a funeral; while a load of oversized vegetables under Jenn's "care" come out looking like they went through a salad shooter.
99	5	"Holy Horrible Voice, Batman!"	April 22, 2015	719 / 99	N/A
Todd and Tamera prove they are NOT superheroes when they struggle to haul Batman's cape worn by Val Kilmer. Meanwhile a 1970's recording console that's used to making hits, ends up taking a few, as Jenn's distracted with dreams of a new singing career.
100	6	"Munsters...The Final Frontier!"	April 29, 2015	720 / 100	N/A
Marc lands a Frankenstein sized Munster load from the classic TV show, but the biggest scare comes when he's forced to call Jenn in to help; meanwhile in the battle for space, Todd and Tamera ship a lunar lander and find out that gravity is not just a good idea, it's a law!

=== Season 9 (2021) ===
No. overall	No. in season	Title	Original release date	Prod. code	Viewers (millions)
101	1	"Tower of Power"	November 30, 2021	721 / 101	N/A
Natasha risks profit and time when signals get crossed on the dimensions of a massive radio tower, while Dwight and Tyesha fear becoming the villains after a load of super hero statues get roughed up under their watch.
102	2	"The Creature and the Wine"	November 30, 2021	722 / 102	N/A
A massive animatronic creature with a one-day deadline is nightmare fuel for Molly and Russell, while Tamara has dreams of a sweet payday getting an oversized wine barrel across the country.
103	3	"Playing with Fire"	December 7, 2021	723 / 103	N/A
Natasha's big rig is in question when she takes on transporting a vintage fire truck to its original home, while Molly and Russel's load filled with Hollywood memorabilia is crate filled with issues.
104	4	"High Flying Artifacts"	December 7, 2021	724 / 104	N/A
There's turbulence in the air when Doug attempts to haul a retired airplane fuselage with his truck, as Dwight and Tyesha double book a load of ancient artifacts and a real embalming table in Austin, Texas.
105	5	"Bowling for Candy"	December 14, 2021	725 / 105	N/A
106	6	"T-Wrecks"	December 14, 2021	726 / 106	N/A
