= Purdue Big Bass Drum =

Bass drum used in the Purdue University Marching band

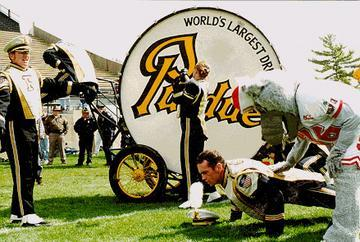
In the South End Zone of Ross–Ade Stadium on September 28, 1996, as Purdue defeated North Carolina State 42–21.

The Purdue Big Bass Drum is a percussion instrument played by the All-American Marching Band (AAMB) of Purdue University. At a height of over ten feet (3.0 m) when the carriage is included, it is branded by Purdue as the "World's Largest Drum". Since its inception, it has become a lasting symbol of the marching band as well as the university. The drum can be seen at all Purdue home football games as well as parades, alumni rallies, the Indianapolis 500 Race, and many other special events.

== Appearance ==
The drum stands approximately ten feet high on its carriage. Purdue is reluctant to disclose the exact measurements of the drum, claiming the dimensions are an AAMB secret. Hayleigh Colombo of the Indianapolis Star was able to confirm the drum's original 1921 size of 7 feet 3 inches (2.21 m) in diameter and 3 feet 9 inches (1.14 m) wide from microfilm stored at the Tippecanoe County Public Library. However, the Leedy Manufacturing Company, its original manufacturer, increased the drum's size by "several inches" in 1937. Thus, the drum's modern exact dimensions remain unknown to the public. Many of the original components, the carriage, axle, wheels, and wood shell of the drum are all intact and well preserved. Since its trip to Ireland with the "All-American" Marching Band in the spring of 2013, the drum has been restored with new paint and select new parts to replace ones damaged on the trip. The carriage is built upon a Ford Model A back axle and wheelbase. The rims are steel wire spoke rims common during the 1910s in the racing circuit.

The drum is handled by a crew of six or seven, who are selected for their strength and agility. They painstakingly rehearse every movement of the drum to assure its being in the right place at the right time in accordance with the precise timing necessary for the fast-paced shows presented by the All-American Band.

== History ==
In 1921, band director Paul Spotts Emrick commissioned the Leedy Manufacturing Company in Indianapolis, Indiana, to produce a massive bass drum. Other bands were trying to make large drums at the time, but most could only achieve a diameter of about four feet. Emrick wanted a drum larger than that; specifically, he wanted a drum "larger than the man playing it." The main constraints included finding cattle skins large enough to use for drum heads, and carrying the drum both during and in between performances. After months of searching, Leedy's suppliers solved the first problem by finding steers weighing between 2,000 and 3,000 pounds each, which are said to have been from Argentina. These large heads put a great strain on the shell, requiring special reinforcement rods to be designed. While other marching bands had tried having two people work together to move their large drums along the football field, Emrick and Leedy decided to use a wheeled carriage. After contacting Jesse Lemon of the New York Central Railroad, Emrick was able to find a baggage car with a door large enough to accommodate the Monster.

The Purdue Drum's first football game was at the University of Chicago, whose band members immediately contacted C.G. Conn asking for an even larger drum. The resulting instrument was completed the following year. In 1939, Chicago disbanded its football program and the drum was placed in storage, allegedly becoming irradiated as a result of studies relating to the Manhattan Project. It was eventually returned to Conn in Elkhart, Indiana, after it passed a Geiger test. It was sold to the University of Texas at Austin for $1 in 1954, where it was nicknamed "Big Bertha".

The Purdue Drum was refurbished in 1937 when the natural wood finish was replaced by an old gold diamond pattern and several inches were added to the drum's size. With the arrival of World War II, the Big Bass Drum was put into storage as the materials required such as animal skin drum heads and rubber tires were not supportive of the war effort. By the time Al Wright became Purdue's director of bands in 1954, the Big Bass Drum had been neglected after years of damage in storage. Wright had the drum repaired and once again made it a centerpiece of the marching band. Because large cattle were much rarer than they were when the drum was built, Remo began making Mylar drum heads for Purdue in the early 1960s. These synthetic heads can be changed frequently.

While the drum may have been the world's largest in overall size at the time it was constructed, other drums have claimed the title of world's largest, such as the Millennium Drum. In 1961, the Texas and Purdue chapters of Kappa Kappa Psi, an honorary band fraternity, pledged to bring their drums to the national convention in Wichita, Kansas, for a direct comparison; however, only Purdue showed up. No official side-by-side comparative measurement has ever been made, but larger bass drums have been constructed since. In 2012, the University of Missouri debuted Big Mo at 9 feet (2.7 m) in diameter and 54 inches (1,400 mm) in depth. Subsequently, on October 15, 2022, Texas retired Big Bertha in its 100th year of service and introduced Big Bertha II as the largest bass drum in the world at 9.5 feet (2.9 m) in diameter and 55 inches (1,400 mm) in depth during halftime of their game against Iowa State at Darrell K Royal–Texas Memorial Stadium.

The drum has also gained national attention on several occasions, such as when it has been stolen, usually by students from Notre Dame or Big Ten rival Indiana University.

In 2021, the drum celebrated its 100th anniversary with the Purdue Band. The band honored its legacy by featuring it and its crew during a halftime show against the University of Minnesota in October. Earlier that season, the BBD was denied entry into Notre Dame Stadium because the visiting team's tunnel into the stadium was too small for the drum to fit through, and Notre Dame denied access to their larger tunnel. This was the first time in 42 years that the BBD had missed a performance with the Purdue Band.

== Traditions ==
=== Spinning in the Block P ===
In 1907 the Purdue All-American Marching Band was the first marching band to break ranks and form a block letter on the field. During the pregame show, the drum is positioned in the 'P' formed by the marching band and spins while the band plays "Hail Purdue!".

=== Indianapolis 500 ===
Being part of the official band of the Indianapolis 500, the drum can be seen on the back of a pickup truck driven around the track.

=== Aerials ===
When Purdue scores, the drum crew can occasionally be seen performing aerials in the Southeast endzone of Ross–Ade Stadium. This is accomplished by first removing the 'third' wheel, which acts as kick stand. Two crew members pull down of the back of the drum as two other members are lifted on the front bar of the carriage, while performing acrobatic stunts, such as spinning on the bar, horizontal holds, and one handed balancing.

=== Pushups ===
Drum crew members perform push-ups each time the Purdue Boilermakers score a touchdown. The push-ups correspond to the total score achieved at that point by the Purdue football team. The push-up tradition was started by Eric Stankiewicz in 1994.

=== Signatures ===
Another tradition is for celebrities to sign the drum head, and old autographed heads are kept in the Bands Department. The head was signed by U.S. President Harry Truman in 1961. Kix Brooks of Brooks and Dunn signed his name to the drum before a concert at Purdue University in 1995. Other signatures include astronauts Gus Grissom and Neil Armstrong as well as Snoop Dogg and the Kodo Drummers of Japan. The inside of the drum is filled with names of previous drum crew members that can be seen through two air expansion holes in the side of the drum.

=== Training ===
Every fall during the week of camp, training occurs. The potential crew is put through a series of physical and public relations tests to determine if they suit the characteristics needed to be on the crew. Physical tests include: 2 minutes of push-ups, 2 minutes of sit-ups, a 1.5-mile run, a 100-meter dash, and a 400-meter run. Each test has a perfect score for which members aim. A series of questions are asked to the crew to see how they would respond in certain situations because during a year many types of situations can occur ranging from talking with celebrities, rowdy fans, and senior citizens. Each takes a certain adaptation that a crew member needs to make. Questions also include history of and other important facts of the drum such as its size and original cost.
