= Big Bertha (drum) =

Bass drum used by the Longhorn Band of the University of Texas at Austin

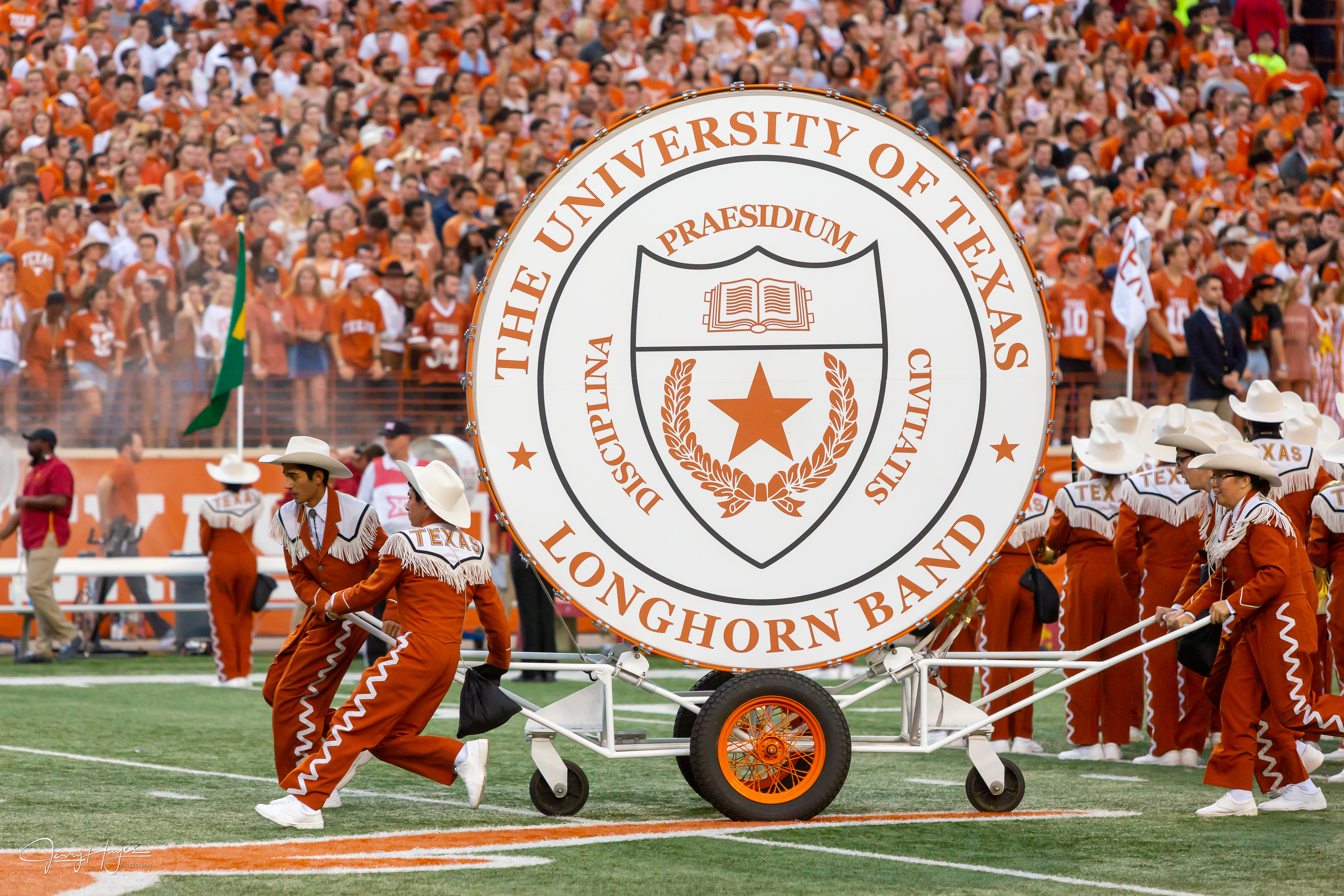
The original Big Bertha in fall 2018.

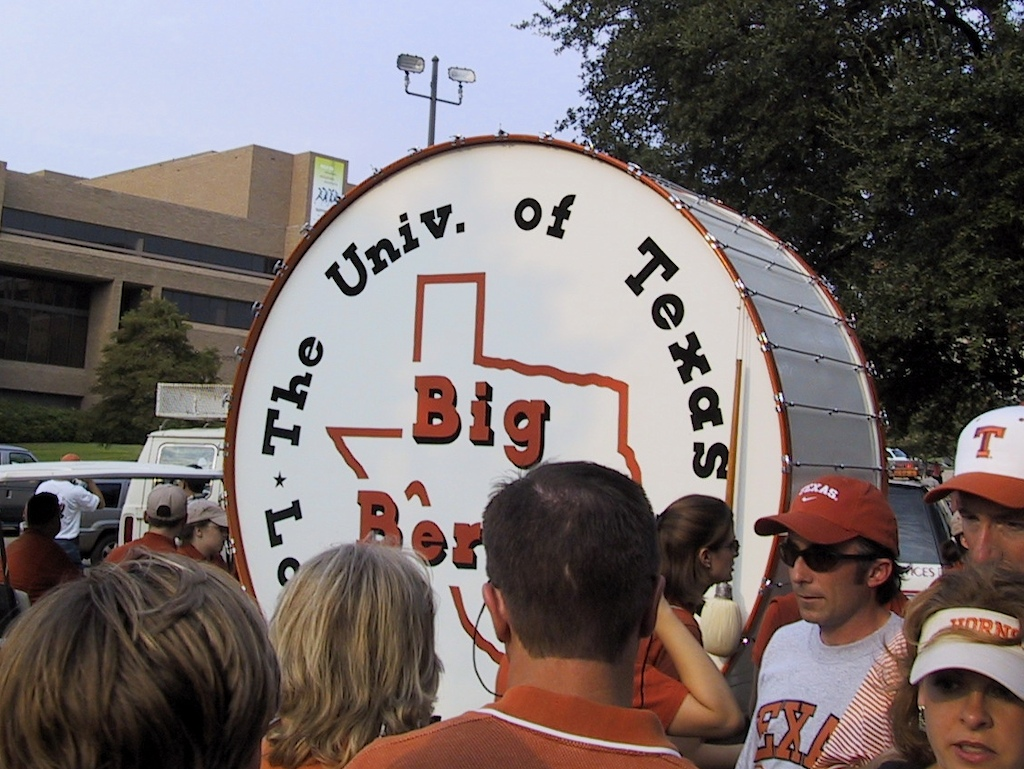
The original Big Bertha outside Darrell K Royal–Texas Memorial Stadium before a UT football game.

Big Bertha is a bass drum used by the Longhorn Band of The University of Texas at Austin. The Big Bertha name was chosen to evoke the famous German Big Bertha howitzer and has been used for two Texas bass drums, with the second debuting in 2022. Both Big Berthas have laid claim to being the largest bass drum in the world.

Big Bertha is wheeled onto the field for the pre-game show during division one football games, and is used in other occasions such as parades – including the London's New Year's Day Parade accompanied by the Longhorn Alumni Band – and spirit rallies. The drum is managed by the Bertha Crew, sometimes called "drum wranglers", who move the drum and play it after touchdowns, and it is nicknamed the "Sweetheart of the Longhorn Band".

== The original Big Bertha ==
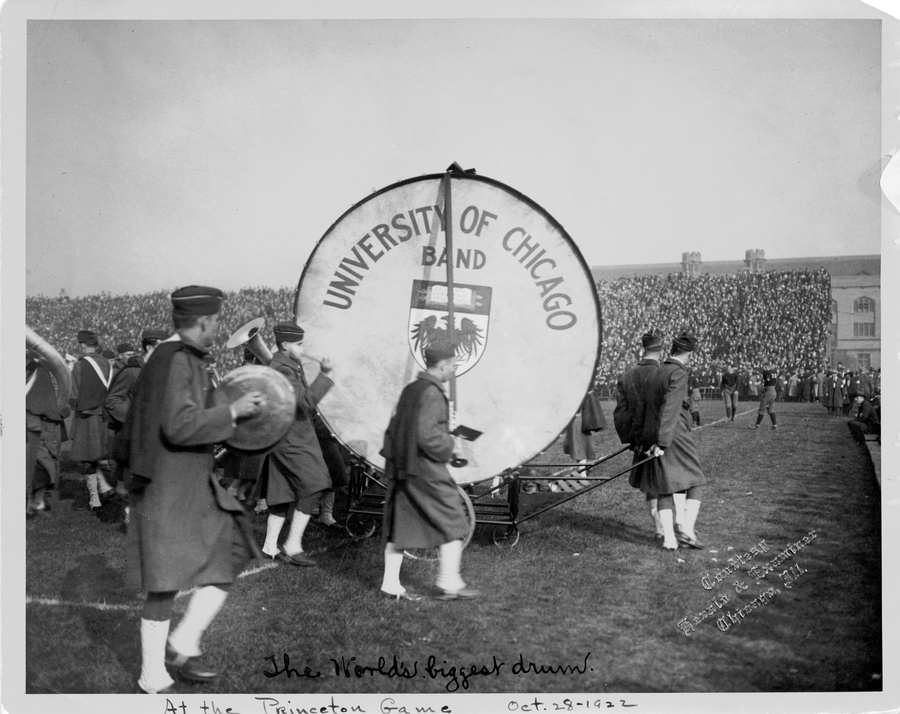
The original Big Bertha with the University of Chicago's band in October 1922.

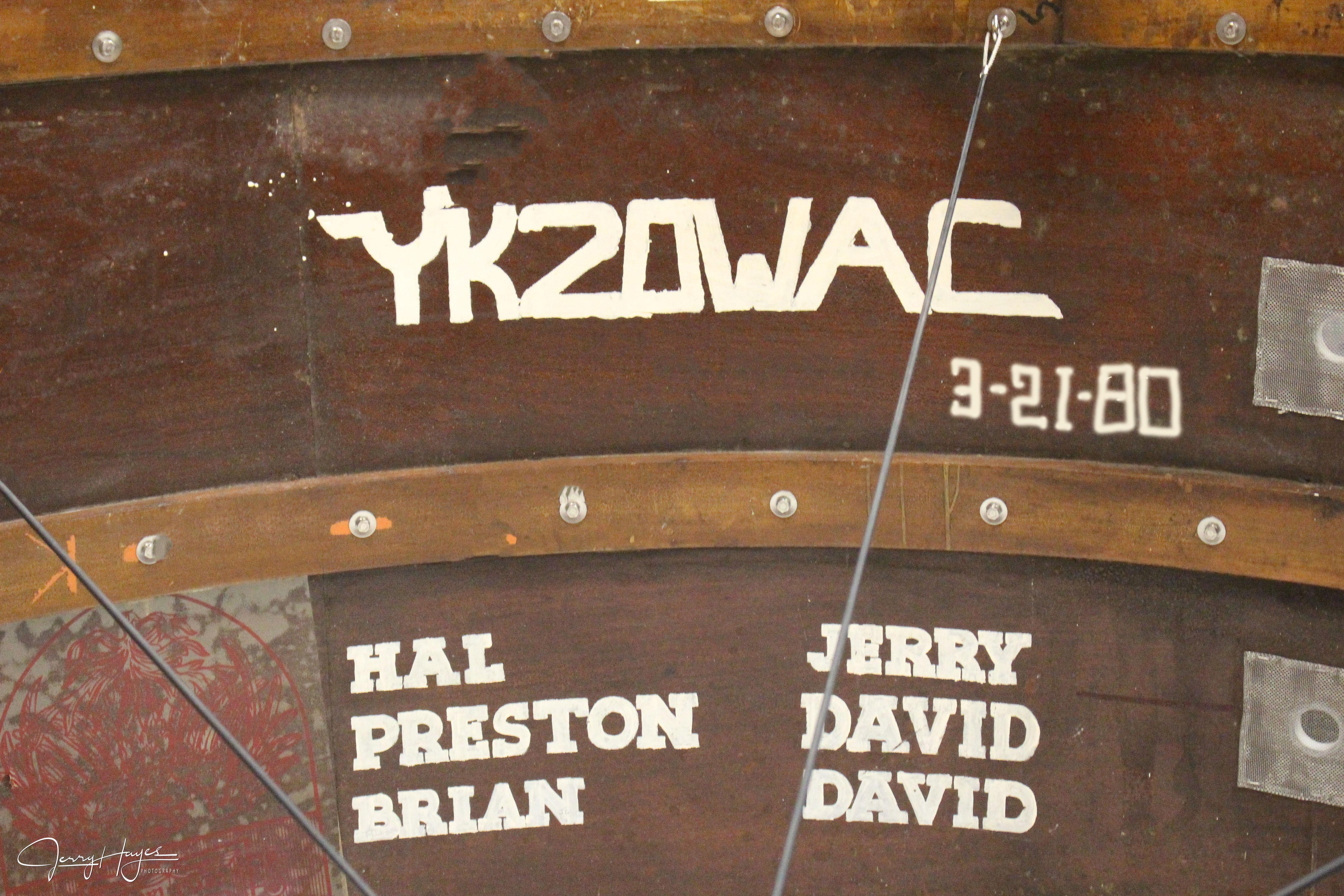
Photo of the inside of the original Big Bertha showing the names of the Kappa Kappa Psi pledges who removed toxic lead paint in 1980.

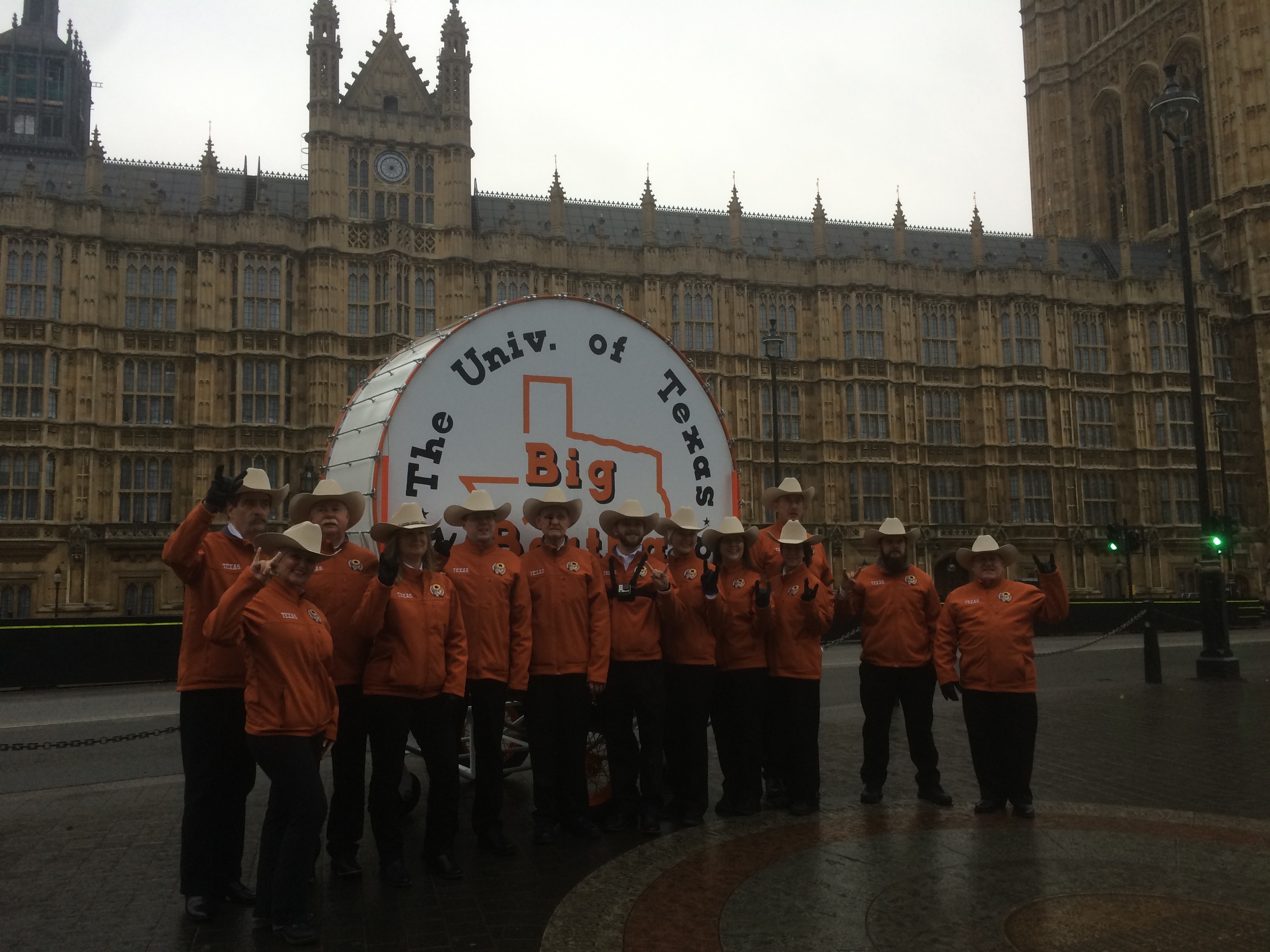
The original Big Bertha and the Bertha Crew in front of the Palace of Westminster while in London for London's New Year's Day Parade on January 1, 2015.

=== Description ===
The university claimed the original Big Bertha to be the world's largest drum; it measures 8 feet (2.4 m) in diameter, 44 inches (1.1 m) in depth, stands 10 feet (3.0 m) tall when on its four-wheeled cart and weighs more than 500 pounds (230 kg).

=== History ===
In 1922, the University of Chicago commissioned C.G. Conn Instruments to build a massive bass drum for the school following a home game where Purdue University's All-American Marching Band brought the Purdue Big Bass Drum. Chicago's drum was first used in the 1922 rival game versus Princeton University. When the University of Chicago ended its varsity football program in 1939, the drum was stored under the school's bleachers. It later allegedly became radioactively contaminated as a result of research for the Manhattan Project conducted at the stadium during the 1940s, though it passed a Geiger test before it was returned to Conn.

In 1954, Colonel D. Harold Byrd, a long-time benefactor of the Longhorn Band, suggested that the drum be purchased from the University of Chicago and given a new home at Texas. Mr. Moton Crockett Jr, former student and Director of the Longhorn Band, purchased Bertha for $1.00 from Conn and transported the drum from Elkhart, Indiana, to Austin, Texas, using his own truck and trailer. Mr. Crockett refurbished the drum during the spring and summer of 1955, and presented it to incoming Director of the Longhorn Band, Vincent R. DiNino. Mr. Crockett established an endowment for the care of Bertha.

In 1961, the University of Texas and Purdue University chapters of Kappa Kappa Psi pledged to bring their respective drums to a showdown to decide the title of "World's Largest Drum" at the fraternal national convention in Wichita, Kansas; however, as only the Purdue branch of the fraternity showed up, with the Purdue Big Bass Drum, UTA lost its self-claimed title to own the "World's Largest Drum". As of 2018, The Guinness Book of World Records lists a Korean drum as the largest. In March 1980 a Kappa Kappa Psi pledge class hand-scraped years' of toxic lead paint from the body of the drum and the drum's trailer, returning the finish to a high luster. The six pledges' names are inscribed on the inner wall of the drum and can only be seen when the drum heads are removed.

In 2005, the university celebrated the 50th anniversary of Big Bertha. In 2015, Big Bertha appeared in Season 17, Episode 13 of A&E's Shipping Wars as part of its journey to appear in London's New Year's Day Parade in London, England.

== Big Bertha II ==
On October 15, 2022, during halftime of Texas' game against Iowa State in its 100th year of service, the original Big Bertha made its final appearance before entering the school's Frank Denius Family Athletics Hall of Fame, but its successor, Big Bertha II, was also unveiled as it was wheeled to the center of the field at Darrell K Royal–Texas Memorial Stadium alongside the original.

Made by Austin-based A&F Drum Co., Big Bertha II claims to be the largest bass drum in the world, measuring just over 9.5 feet in diameter and 55 inches in depth in comparison to other drums. The Purdue Big Bass Drum's original 1921 dimensions are 7 feet and 5 inches in diameter and 41 inches in depth, as confirmed in 2013 by Hayleigh Colombo of the Indianapolis Star using microfilm stored at the Tippecanoe County Public Library in Lafayette, Indiana. However, the Leedy Manufacturing Company (the Purdue Drum's original manufacturer) increased its size by "several inches" in 1937.

Big Bertha II is larger than the University of Missouri's Big Mo measuring 9 feet in diameter and 54 inches in depth.

Big Bertha II was manufactured with a proprietary material with aluminum, is wired with an internal mic system that will allow it to wirelessly connect to the stadium sound system and plays the lowest note ever played on a bass drum.

== See also ==
- Purdue Big Bass Drum
