= Leedy Manufacturing Company =

American drum brand

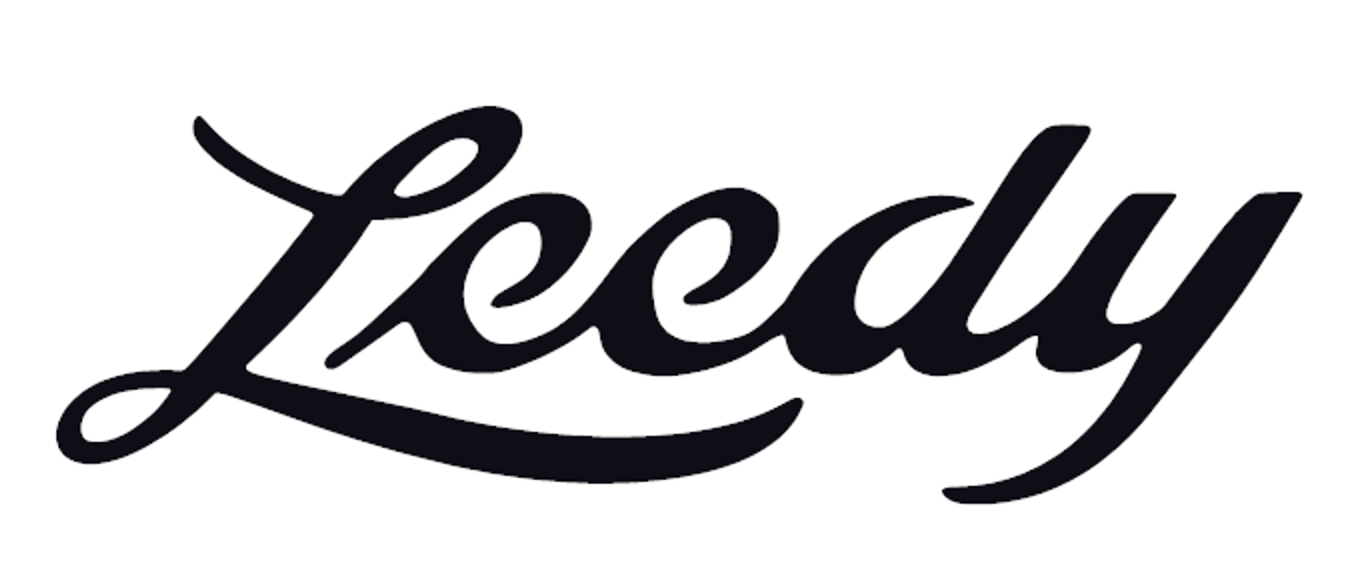
- Predecessor: Leedy-Cooley Manufacturing Company
- Founded: 1902; 124 years ago
- Headquarters: Indianapolis, Indiana; Elkhart, Indiana
- Key people: Ulysses G. Leedy, President (1902–1929); Herman E. Winterhoff, Vice President (1902–1930); George H. Way, Sales Manager (1921–1946; 1948–1955)
- Parent: C. G. Conn (1929–1955); Slingerland (1955–1986); Gretsch (1986–present)

The Leedy Manufacturing Company (also known as the Leedy Drum Company) was an American manufacturer of percussion instruments headquartered in Indianapolis, Indiana. Leedy was highly successful in the early twentieth century, and it was at one point the largest manufacturer of drums and other percussion instruments in the world.

The company was formed by Ulysses. G. Leedy as the Leedy-Cooley Manufacturing Company with partner Sam Cooley in 1897 before the partnership was dissolved in 1902 to become simply the Leedy Manufacturing Company. It was purchased by C. G. Conn of Elkhart, Indiana, where it was later combined with Ludwig & Ludwig to form Leedy & Ludwig. When C. G. Conn sold its drum divisions, the Slingerland Drum Company bought the rights to Leedy and produced drums under its badge until the 1960s. Slingerland was ultimately purchased by Gretsch, and with it, Leedy, where the brand has lain relatively dormant since.

The company was responsible for many innovations in percussion but is best known for the invention of the vibraphone and the creation of the Purdue Big Bass Drum.

== History ==
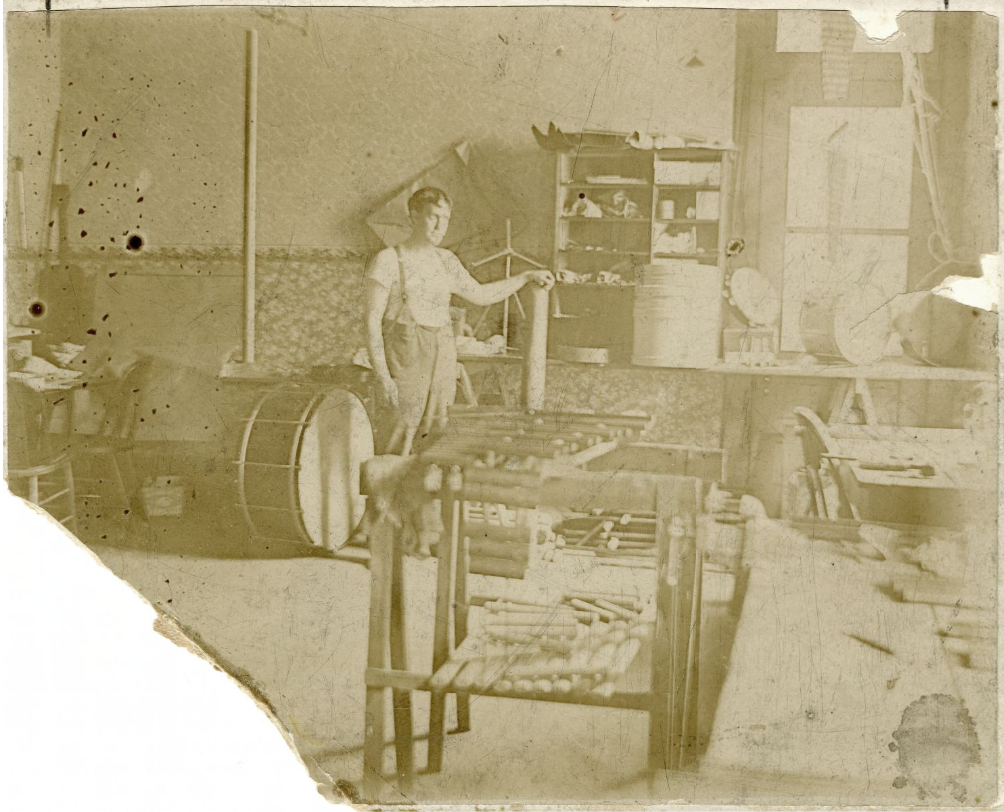
Ulysses G. Leedy in his workroom at the Indianapolis Cyclorama Building circa 1898

=== Beginnings ===
Ulysses G. Leedy was born in 1867 in Hancock County, Ohio before his family moved to Fostoria, Ohio. When Leedy was seven years old, his mother purchased a drum for him from an old Civil War veteran. Leedy took a liking to the instrument, later joining the 15th Regimental Drum Corps as a teenager and the Fostoria town band and orchestra as a young adult. After being seen playing a xylophone solo with the town band, he was asked to join the Great Western Band at Cedar Point by their business manager. After playing with the group for three years, Leedy started taking on theater gigs and traveled the nation. After taking the job as a trap set player for the English Hotel and Opera House, Leedy settled in Indianapolis.

During his travels, Leedy began to make drums and hardware for himself and his peers as different musical needs arose. Starting in 1895, Leedy and his roommate, Sam Cooley (a clarinetist for the English Hotel and Opera House orchestra), sold drums out of their apartment. In 1897, and with only fifty dollars between the duo, they bought a room in the basement of the old Indianapolis Cyclorama Building and formally established themselves as the Leedy-Cooley Manufacturing Company. One of the more popular products of Leedy-Cooley was an adjustable snare drum stand, the first of its type, that Leedy had patented in 1899.

In 1902, the partnership was dissolved and the Leedy Manufacturing Company was established as a corporation between Herman E. Winterhoff, Charles B. Wanamaker, and Leedy. Winterhoff served as a tuner for the keyboard percussion division and was the vice president of the company, while Wanamaker served as secretary-treasurer. Wanamaker was successful as a designer, having worked as an engineer and business owner in the Cyclorama Building (where he met Leedy) prior to joining the company. During his tenure, he helped Leedy develop and patent an early snare drum strainer that allowed the wires to be moved away from the bottom head as a single unit. Wanamaker retired at the age of seventy in 1920 but remained one of the largest shareholders until the company was acquired by C. G. Conn in 1929.

Leroy Jefferies, who would become the company's longest employee, was one of the original stockholders. He first worked as a mechanic for the factory, later becoming the chief engineer and foreman of the plant. The next year, in 1903, the Cyclorama Building was demolished, and Leedy built his first factory at the corner of Palmer Street and Barth Avenue.

=== Expansion ===
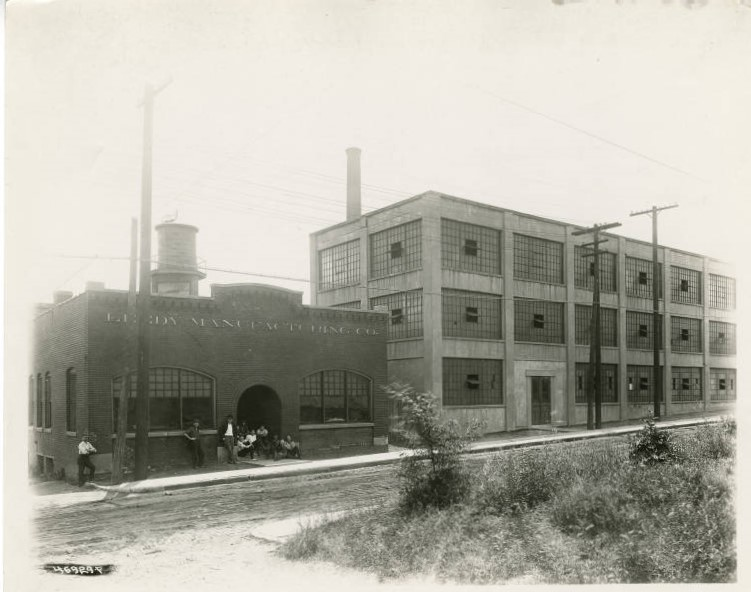
The Leedy Manufacturing Company factory in 1916. To the left is the original building constructed in 1903, and to the right is the three-story expansion constructed in 1910.

Expansions were made to the factory in 1910 and 1920, topping out at around 78,450 square feet (7,288 m^{2}). At the height of production, the Leedy factory had over twenty departments, from a lumberyard and tannery to art and plating departments.

As the company grew to become the largest manufacturer of drums in the world, Leedy desired an experienced sales manager. As such, he hired George H. Way, who had worked for George B. Stone & Son, Inc. and was co-founder of the Advance Drum Company, in 1921. One of the ideas of George Way was Leedy Drum Topics, a periodical that sought to inform drummers while also promoting Leedy products. It was the first periodical dedicated solely to percussion and ran from 1923 to 1941. Another important addition to the Leedy staff was Cecil H. Strupe, who was brought on as chief engineer, replacing Jefferies who was instead relegated to the foreman of the machine shop. The most important of his designs was introducing a ratchet and pawl clutch system for timpani that kept the pedals in place.

=== Acquisition ===
In 1929, U. G. Leedy began to show signs of failing health. As such, he sold the company to C. G. Conn that year. On January 7, 1931, he died at the age of 63 due to heart disease. In 1930, Conn moved the factory operations to Elkhart, Indiana, where the rest of their products were made. Several employees, such as Jefferies and Way, made the move to Elkhart, but many, such as Winterhoff and Strupe, chose to stay in Indianapolis instead.

=== Leedy & Ludwig ===
In 1909, a pair of brothers opened up a drum shop in Chicago named Ludwig & Ludwig. Among their ventures, they acted as a distributor for Leedy products. However, they also began to manufacture their own products. By 1923, it grew to become among the largest drum companies in the world, rivaling the likes of Leedy. In late 1929, C. G. Conn acquired Ludwig & Ludwig, and similar to Leedy, moved their production to Elkhart.

Both Leedy and Ludwig drums were made in the same factory, only differing in their marketing and name. In 1950, Conn decided that it made financial sense to combine its two drum divisions to create Leedy & Ludwig. To promote this merger, George Way devised a new line of drums called Knob Tension drums. The idea was that the tension rods used for tightening the drumhead could be replaced with a series of knobs to forgo the use of a drum key. This line was pushed to the forefront of production, while the former flagship drums of both Leedy and Ludwig were relegated to secondary status. However, the drums proved unsuccessful, as owners found them hard to maintain and tune. After just a few years, the drums were pulled from the catalog and were seen as a commercial failure.

=== Fate ===
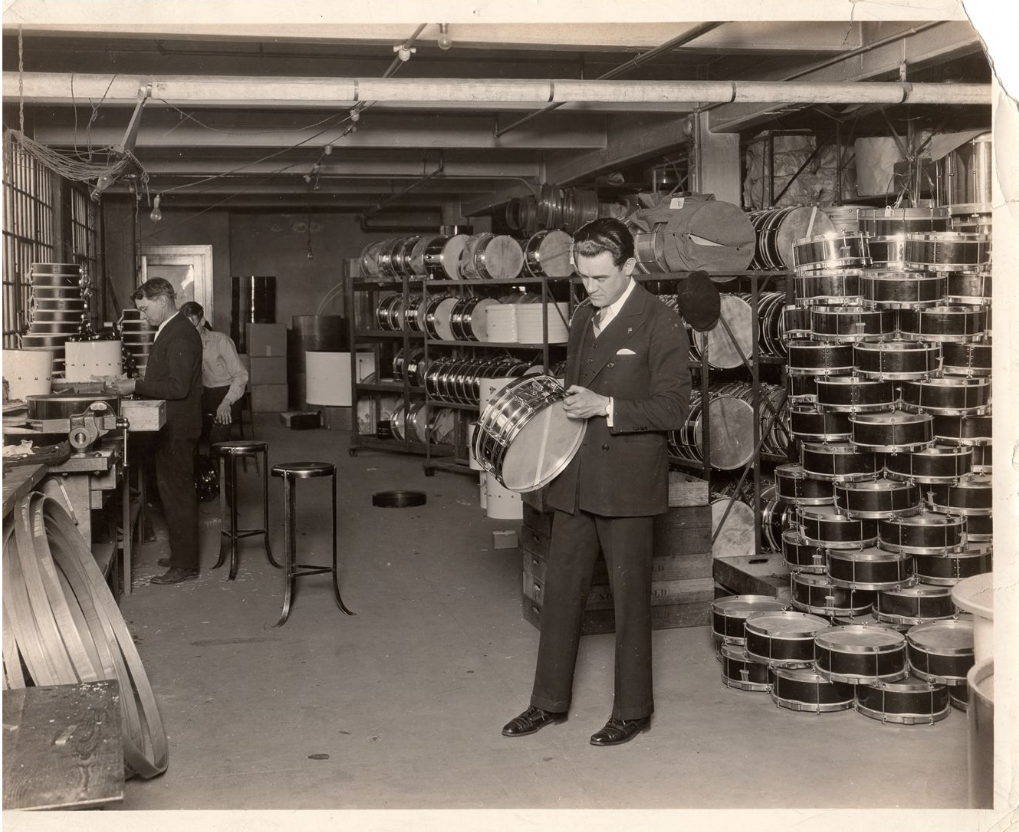
George Marsh, drummer for the Paul Whiteman Orchestra, inspects a snare drum in the Leedy factory

The failure of the Knob Tension line, combined with other financial difficulties and a desire to expand into the production of electric organs, led to C. G. Conn selling its drum divisions in 1955. The Ludwig trademark was bought by William F. Ludwig Sr. of the WFL Company who saw the opportunity to buy back the family name, while the Leedy trademark was sold to Slingerland Drum Company. George Way, who had already departed the company a year prior, started his own drum company in 1957, housed in the former Leedy & Ludwig production plant.

Slingerland started producing drums under the Leedy name shortly after purchase, marketing the brand to dealers as the budget option. Only drum kit components and timpani were sold under Slingerland, with the keyboard percussion division being dissolved. Nevertheless, Slingerland found, as Conn had before, that producing two separate lines of drums proved to be unviable. Slingerland gradually phased out the Leedy brand with the last Leedy catalog being printed in 1965.

In 1986, Fred W. Gretsch bought the rights to Leedy as part of his purchase of Slingerland. While the Slingerland portion of the purchase was later sold to Gibson, Gretsch Drums currently owns the trademarks and patents to Leedy. Although small batches of drums have intermittently been made for trade shows such as NAMM to maintain the trademark, and the company has expressed interest, there have been no concrete plans made to fully revive the brand.

== L&S ==
Before his death, U. G. Leedy founded the General Products Corporation in 1930 as a way to take care of employees during the Great Depression that did not wish to move to Elkhart. The company did not focus on percussion instruments and made products such as windshield wipers and registers. Cecil Strupe, the former chief engineer for the Leedy Company, was made president, and U. G. Leedy served as vice president until his death, where he was replaced by his son, Edwin Hollis Leedy.

After the death of U. G. Leedy, the company began selling drums under the name Leedy & Son, but was stopped by C. G. Conn who now owned the rights to the Leedy name. As such, the brand was renamed to simply L&S, which was popularly known as Leedy & Strupe. As they could not afford a sales team, their products were distributed by Chicago Musical Instruments. However, it was never a successful venture, and Strupe left the company to join the newly formed WFL Drum Company in 1937 as their chief engineer. The assets were later sold to Indiana Music, a local music shop, who simply sold the remaining stock.

== Products ==
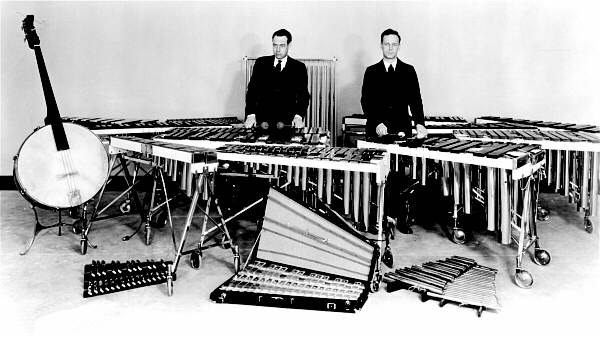
Joe and George Hamilton Green of the Green Brothers Band are shown with Leedy keyboard percussion instruments and a timp-bass

Alongside drum kit components such as snares and bass drums, Leedy also manufactured banjos, keyboard percussion instruments, and timpani. Leedy also produced its own accessories and hardware, including drum cases, sticks, and drumheads. The drumhead division was headed by John Gyuka, a Romanian-born immigrant who joined the company in 1906 and remained there through its acquisition by C. G. Conn. He was particularly noted for his timpani heads, and the premier line of drumheads that used his process were stamped "UKA" (the last few letters of his name). Leedy also produced their own cymbals made of inexpensive brass or nickel silver, but higher quality bronze cymbals made by the Avedis Zildjian Company were also available through their catalog. The Zenjian line was developed for both Leedy and Ludwig by Zildjian in the early 1930s as a cheaper line of cymbals. However, the brand was discontinued in 1946 after C. G. Conn was found stamping lower quality UFIP cymbals with the logo which led to Zildjian threatening to sue.

=== Vibraphone ===
In 1916, while experimenting with vox humana effects on a J. C. Deagan, Inc. steel marimba, Winterhoff invented the vibraphone. This instrument differed from the modern vibraphone in that it produced the namesake vibrato effect by pulsing the resonators up and down. In 1921, Winterhoff perfected the design by instead inserting circular discs into the resonators that could be spun by means of an electric-powered motor and a drive belt. Originally dubbed "vibratone bells", George Way later gave it its name, "vibraphone", and began to market it in small batches between 1924 and 1929. It received popularity after a set of novelty recordings by vaudeville performer Louis Frank Chiha. Due to this rising popularity and Leedy's neglect to patent the instrument, Deagan began to sell their own version under the name "vibraharp" beginning in 1927. The model by Deagan had a damper pedal and bars made of aluminum rather than steel. This eventually became the standard for all following vibraphones, including ones made by Leedy.

=== Banjos ===
During the early 20th century, the banjo surged in popularity. This led to both Leedy and Ludwig & Ludwig trying to cash into the growing demand by developing their own banjo lines. Leedy enlisted the help of Mike Pingitore, banjoist for the Paul Whiteman Orchestra, to create six different models in 1926. Unfortunately, the timing of the venture was poor as the banjo was being replaced in popularity by the guitar. In addition, the Slingerland Banjo Company had entered the drum market in response, creating a fierce competitor that began to take up market share. After no small financial loss, both Leedy and Ludwig & Ludwig were later acquired by C. G. Conn, leaving Slingerland as the largest, family-owned drum company in the world.

The idea of getting into the string instrument market was a source of friction between George Way (who opposed it) and Cecil Strupe (who spearheaded the investment). This led to a falling out between the two men. Way later argued in letters to C. G. Conn president Carl D. Greenleaf that it was the fault of the failed banjo line that Leedy ended up selling the company.

=== Novelty instruments ===
Alongside more common percussion instruments, Leedy also developed novelty instruments for use in vaudeville and radio shows. One such instrument was the "timp-bass", an upright bass with a body made of a timpano drum. Another was the "octa-marimba" or "octarimba", a variation upon the marimba, that had two adjacent bars tuned one octave apart, with corresponding resonator sizes, for every note. Around 3 octaves, it was played with a forked mallet that was able to hit both notes concurrently. Only about fifty octarimbas were made from 1934 to 1938. Both the timp-bass and octarimba were used and recorded by Joe and George Hamilton Green of the Green Brothers Band whom were sponsored by Leedy.

=== Purdue Big Bass Drum and other large instruments ===
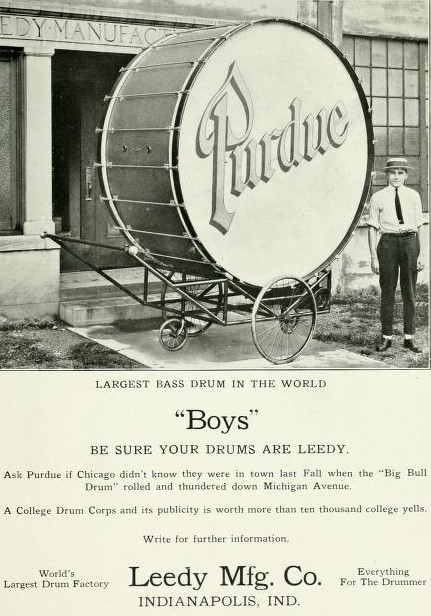
An ad by Leedy showing the Purdue Big Bass Drum in 1922

In June 1921, Paul Spotts Emrick, the band director of the Purdue "All-American" Marching Band, commissioned the Leedy Company to create the "world's largest drum" for a cost of $800 (equivalent to about $14,400 in 2025). Most large bass drums at the time were only about 4 feet (1.2 m) in diameter, constrained by finding a large enough hide to fashion a drumhead. To find cows that were large enough, Leedy worked with Kingan & Company, a local butchery, who provided two cattle, each weighing over 2,000 pounds (910 kg). At its unveiling in August, The Indianapolis Star reported the drum as 7 ft 3 in (2.21 m) in diameter by 42 inches (110 cm) in depth. This instigated a "drum war" for the title of the "world's largest drum" with the University of Chicago Band who commissioned C. G. Conn to create Big Bertha the following year. Big Bertha was later purchased by the Longhorn Band of the University of Texas at Austin in 1954 where the rivalry between the two drums still continues.

After the popularity of the Purdue Big Bass Drum, Leedy advertised in their catalog the next year that they would make giant bass drums on special order. Leedy stopped producing giant bass drums in 1930 after their purchase by Conn, but they continued to offer maintenance on preexisting drums, increasing the size of the Purdue Big Bass Drum by several inches in 1937.

Another giant instrument made by Leedy was a 6 feet (1.8 m) tall glockenspiel (also dubbed "the world's largest") specially made for the Ringling Bros. and Barnum & Bailey Circus in 1925.

== See also ==
- Camco Drum Company, successor to the George H. Way Drum Company
