= Al G. Wright =

American bandleader (1916–2020)

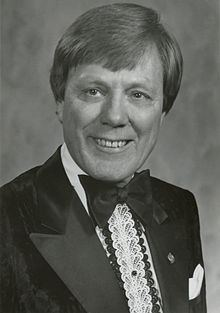
- Born: June 23, 1916; London, England
- Died: September 5, 2020 (aged 104); West Lafayette, Indiana, U.S.
- Education: University of Miami
- Occupation: Band Director
- Employer: Purdue University
- Predecessor: Paul Spotts Emrick
- Successor: Bill Moffit
- Spouse: Gladys Stone Wright

Alfred George James Wright (June 23, 1916 – September 5, 2020) was an American bandleader who served as the Director of Bands Emeritus at Purdue University and Chairman of the Board of the John Philip Sousa Foundation.

== Early years ==
Wright was born in London, England. Whilst still a child he moved with his family to the United States, where he grew up in Pontiac, Michigan. Wright played French horn in high school and earned a music scholarship to the University of Miami in Florida, where he earned both bachelor's (1937) and master's (1947) degrees. He taught band and orchestra at Miami Senior High School from 1938 to 1954.

== Career ==
Wright became director of the Purdue All-American Marching Band (AAMB) in 1954 following the retirement of longtime director Paul Spotts Emrick. He was only the second full-time director in the band's history; Emrick had become director as a student in 1905 and remained as full-time director after graduating in 1908. During his 27-year tenure, Wright introduced a number of innovations to the Purdue band program, including elaborate football halftime shows and an expanded majorette corps featuring the Golden Girl and Silver Twins. He was also responsible for significantly expanding the band's reach beyond football, including several performances at Radio City Music Hall and international trips to Europe, South America, and Japan. Wright retired in 1981.

== Honors, distinctions, awards ==
In 1981, Wright received an honorary LLD from Troy State University, and, in 1982, Purdue named him a Distinguished Alumnus. Dr. Wright was inducted into the National Band Association Hall of Fame of Distinguished Band Conductors in 1986. Kappa Kappa Psi awarded him the Distinguished Service to Music Medal for concert band and marching band. He was also an honorary member of Phi Mu Alpha Sinfonia.

== Personal life and death ==
Wright and his wife Gladys Stone Wright lived in West Lafayette, Indiana. He turned 100 in June 2016 and died in September 2020 at the age of 104.
