= Paul Spotts Emrick =

American bandleader

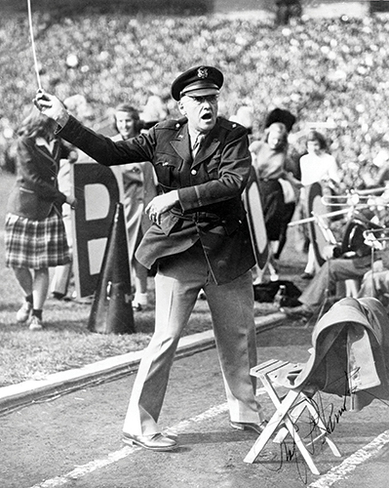
- Born: March 30, 1884; Rochester, Indiana, US
- Died: July 28, 1965 (aged 81); Rochester, Indiana, US
- Education: Purdue University
- Occupations: Band Director; Professor of Electrical Engineering
- Successor: Al G. Wright
- Spouse(s): Martha Emrick (m. 1907; died 1942); Adeline Emrik (m. 1946)

Paul Spotts Emrick (March 30, 1884 – July 28, 1965) was the first full-time director of the Purdue All-American Marching Band. He became director while still a student at Purdue University in 1905, and then served as full-time director from 1908 to 1954.

== Early life and education ==
A native of Rochester, Indiana, Emrick was born into a musical family; his father directed the citizens' band, and several other members of his family had been band directors. While a student at Rochester High School, the younger Emrick directed a number of ensembles that played at dances and dramatic performances. He primarily played the clarinet, but also played the violin and cornet, among other instruments.

== Director of the All-American Marching Band ==
Emrick came to Purdue in 1904 as an electrical engineering major and immediately joined the school's band. By the time he arrived in West Lafayette, the band had existed for 18 years but had only recently come into its own. The band members had to furnish their own uniforms, instruments, and music. When Emrick arrived, he was one of the few members with a musical background. The directors were elected by the bandsmen either from among themselves or from the faculty. Despite these handicaps, the band had grown to 50 members by 1902, and had become a fixture at football games even though it primarily served to play at drills and ceremonies for the Student Army Training Corps (forerunner of the Purdue ROTC).

Due to his experience as a conductor, Emrick was elected as the band's president and director in 1905, as only a sophomore. Two years later, as a senior, Emrick instituted one of the first of a long list of innovations. At a 1907 game, the band formed a large block "P" as part of its pregame show. It was the first time a marching band had broken out of military ranks to form letters on the field. The "Block P" has been part of every AAMB pregame show since. Years later, in a 1953 interview with the Lafayette Journal & Courier, Emrick recounted seeing geese fly over a lake in the fall, saying "usually, they'd fly in a 'V', but once in a while, they'd change formation and fly in various figures. I used to wonder if you could do that with men drilling."

Emrick was hired as the band's first full-time director after graduating in 1908 and was also appointed a professor of electrical engineering. Under his watch, in 1919 the band became the first to carry the flags of the other schools in the Big Ten Conference. In the same year, it played at the Indianapolis 500, an engagement it has kept for all but three years since then. In 1920, it was the first band to play the opposing school's fight song. In 1935, it was the first band to play with lights on its instruments and uniforms.

His most visible legacy, however, came in 1921. He asked the Leedy Manufacturing Company of Indianapolis to create a giant bass drum "larger than the man playing it". The result was the famous Purdue Big Bass Drum, which debuted that fall. While the size of the resulting drum remains a closely guarded secret, published reports showed it was originally 7 feet 3 inches (2.21 m) in diameter and 3 feet 9 inches (1.14 m) wide.

Emrick was also a noted composer of marches. In 1925, John Philip Sousa read one of them and was impressed enough that when Sousa's band came to Purdue for a performance, Sousa handed his baton to Emrick.

Emrick retired as a professor in 1946 but continued as band director until 1954. More than 6,000 students marched under his baton over the years. By the time he retired for good, he had spent the first half-century of his adult life in West Lafayette as a student, professor, and band director.

== Retirement and death ==
Emrick retired to his hometown of Rochester in 1956. He suffered a severe cerebral hemorrhage in July 1965 and died at Woodlawn Hospital in Rochester on July 11. He had married his second wife, Adeline, in 1946. He had married his first wife, Martha, in 1907 while still a student at Purdue; she had died in 1942.
