= Purdue All-American Marching Band =

Marching band of Purdue University

Purdue "All-American" Marching Band
- School: Purdue University
- Location: West Lafayette, IN
- Conference: Big Ten
- Founded: 1886
- Director: Matt Conaway
- Assistant Directors: Pamela Nave, Lucas H. Petersen, Douglas Fletcher
- Members: 395
- Fight song: "Hail Purdue!"

Uniform
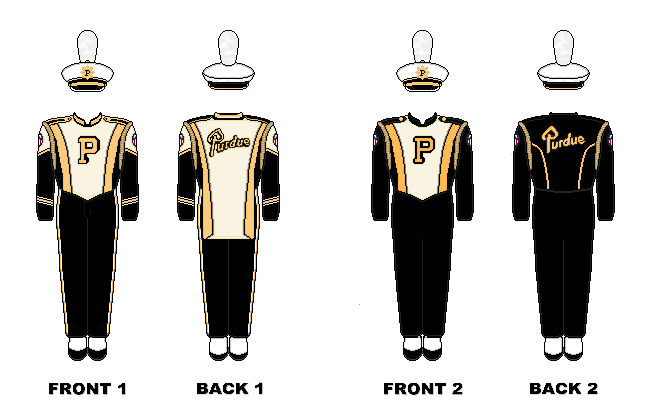
- Website: www.purdue.edu/bands/ensembles/aamb/

The Purdue "All-American" Marching Band (or AAMB) is the marching band of Purdue University and performs at Purdue Boilermakers football games. The AAMB is also the official band of the Indianapolis 500 race, having held the position since 1919.

Since the founding of the band in 1886, the group has grown from an original 5 members to 395 members.

Notable features of the band include the Purdue Big Bass Drum, the Purdue Golden Girl featured twirler, and the "Block P", which is the first marching band field formation created in 1907.

== History and traditions ==
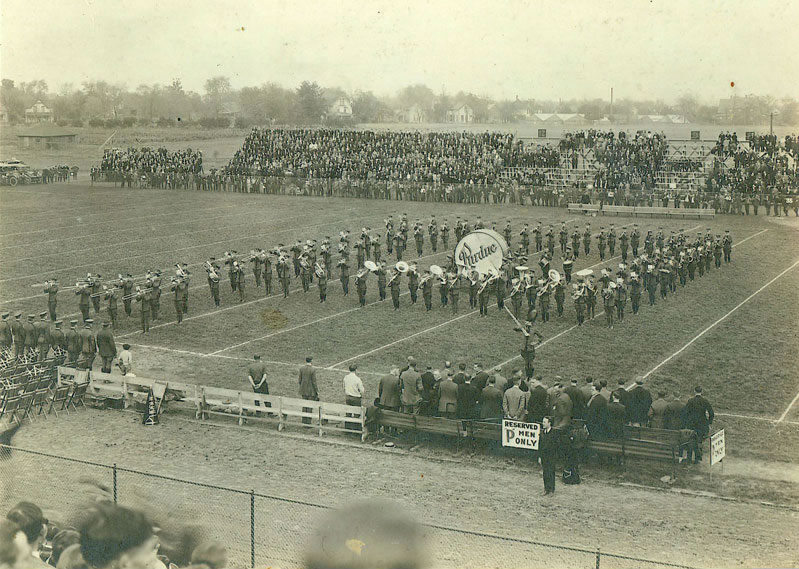
The "Block P" performed in 1922

In 1886, the Purdue Student Army Training Corps, forerunner of the Reserve Officers Training Corps, formed a five-member drum corps to play music for the cadets during their morning conditioning marches. Purdue fielded its first football team a year later, in 1887. The band began playing at games soon afterward. However, during this time it played sporadically, as there was no consistent director; it depended on finding a student or faculty member who was qualified to drill them. Additionally, the band received almost no training and had to provide most of their own equipment and support. Despite this, by 1902 it had grown to 50 members and had become partly self-supporting. Despite the lack of a full-time director, it was already known as one of the best college bands in the nation.

The band's modern history began in 1904 when Paul Spotts Emrick, a freshman engineering student from Rochester, joined the band. His experience as a conductor (and indeed, one of the few members with any musical background at all) resulted in his election as band president and director the next year. During his senior year at Purdue in 1907, the band began forming a giant block "P" during its pregame drill. It was the first time that a band had broken ranks to form a letter on the field. In a 1953 interview with the Lafayette Journal & Courier, Emrick recounted seeing geese fly over a lake in the fall, saying "usually, they'd fly in a 'V', but once in a while, they'd change formation and fly in various figures. I used to wonder if you could do that with men drilling." The now-famous "Block P" has been performed during each pregame show ever since its inception.

Emrick stayed on as full-time director after his graduation in 1908. In 1921 Emrick commissioned the Leedy Manufacturing Company of Indianapolis to construct the world's largest bass drum. The "Big Bass Drum" has been a part of the marching band ever since. In 1935, during a Purdue football game at Northwestern University the band donned lights on their uniforms while performing at halftime. With the stadium lights turned off for the performance, the band drew such awe from radio broadcaster Ted Husing, he referred to them as a "truly All-American marching band," hence the current title of the band.

Emrick retired in 1954, and to date the band has been under the direction of just five other men full time:

- Dr. Al G. Wright (1954–1981)
- William C. Moffit (1981–1988)
- Dr. David A. Leppla (1989–2006)
- Jay S. Gephart (July 1, 2006 – 2024)
- Matt Conaway (2026 - Present)

During this time, there have also been two interim directors:

- Joseph Manfredo (1988–1989)
- Matt Conaway (2025)

Second director Al Wright added many "show band" traditions to the "All-American" Marching Band. He increased the size of the band, added baton twirlers, and changed the uniform to its current look. Wright built upon the patriotism suggested in the "All-American" name of the band by creating the "I Am An American" speech. This speech is read during each pre-game performance while the band plays America the Beautiful.

Wright greatly increased the visibility of the "All-American" Marching Band across the world by taking the band to perform in many countries including Canada, Holland, Germany, Iceland, Japan, Colombia, and Venezuela during the 1960s and 1970s. This tradition of international travel continues today, with other notable trips including an invitation from the Chinese government to perform in international cultural activities that lead up to the 2008 Beijing Summer Olympics. In 2012, 2018 and 2023 the Band also traveled to Ireland for the Saint Patrick's Day Parade in Dublin. In 2015, the AAMB traveled to Medellin, Colombia for the Feria de las Flores.

In 1995 the "All-American" Marching Band was the recipient of the Sudler Trophy, the most prestigious award a college marching band can receive. Currently, the "All-American" Marching Band is the only band from a university without a school of music to have received this award.

== Featured Twirlers ==
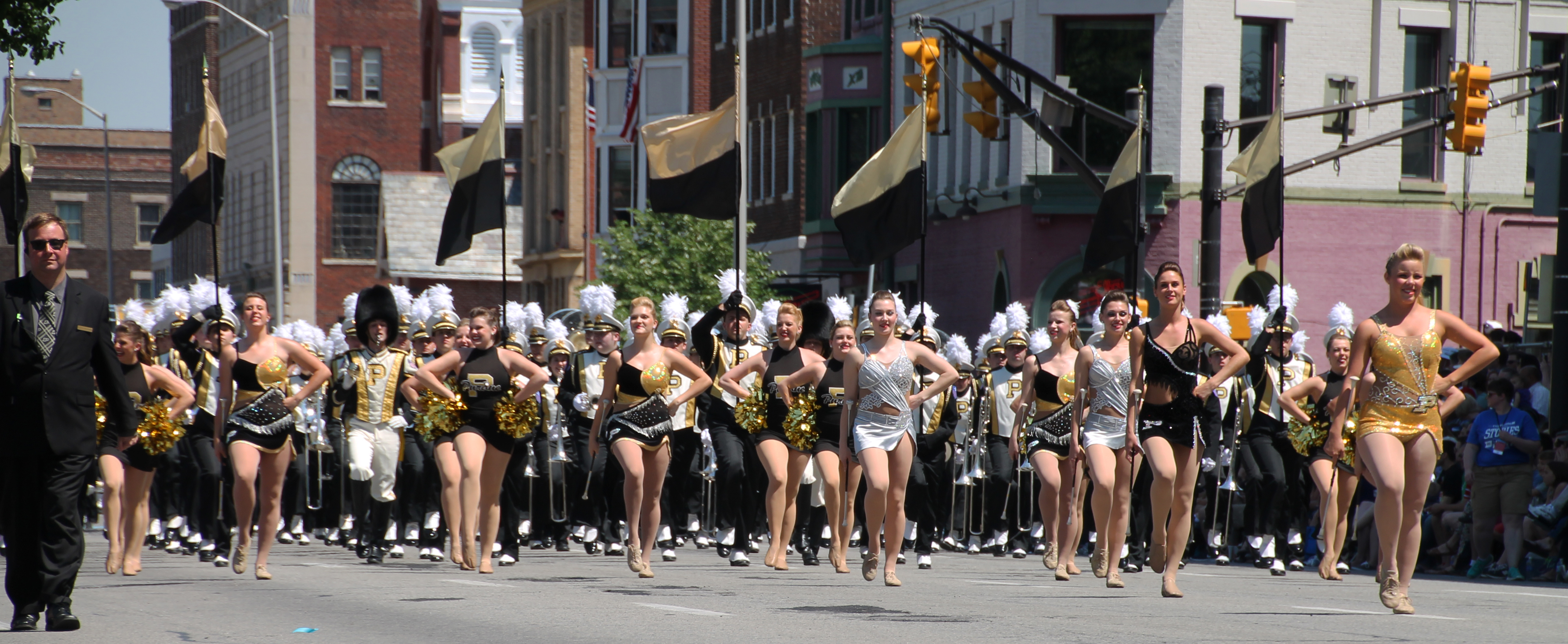
Purdue's All-American Marching Band in the 2015 500 Festival Parade in Indianapolis, Indiana

The Purdue band is also known for its five Featured Twirler positions: the Golden Girl, the Silver Twins, the Girl in Black, and Miss Boilerette.

Purdue's Golden Girl is among the nation's best twirlers. The performer is selected by audition each April and serves as a leader of the AAMB, as well as an ambassador for Purdue University. The tradition of the Golden Girl began in 1954 during the era of quarterback Len Dawson, whose performance on the field prompted the press to nickname him Purdue's "Golden Boy". At the same time, Al G. Wright (now Director of Bands Emeritus) brought his first twirling protégé to the field, Juanita Carpenter, who earned the title of "Golden Girl". When Dawson graduated, Purdue was left without a Golden Boy, but Carpenter's graduation did not have the same effect on her title. Instead Golden Girl became a title that has since been passed down, and the position has become the standard for excellence within the twirling community.

The Silver Twins first graced the field of Purdue's Ross-Ade Stadium in 1960, when twin twirlers Sharon and Karon Roeske gained the attention of Purdue Bands and Orchestras. They were dressed in matching silver uniforms, and like Juanita Carpenter with her role as the Golden Girl, the title has been passed down over the years. Out of the 30 pairings to have taken the field, 12 of them have been sets of twins.

In 1962, another solo twirler position was created to complement the Golden Girl. Dressed in Purdue's other color, black, June Ciampa first performed as the International Twirler. This title was later replaced with "Girl in Black".

2010 saw the first addition to the featured twirlers in 48 years. Dressed in white, Rachel Bazzell became the inaugural Miss Boilerette, a position that has only been held by five individuals.

== Marching band pioneers ==
The Purdue "All-American" Marching Band has pioneered a number of accomplishments. It was the first marching band to:

- Break ranks on a football field to make a formation (The "Block P"), 1907
- Carry the colors of the Big Ten, 1919
- Play opposing school fight song, 1920
- Wear their hats backwards after a conference victory
- Perform at Radio City Music Hall, 1963
- Receive an official performance invitation from China, 2008
- Lead the Macy's Thanksgiving Day Parade from the Big Ten, 2010

== Band composition ==
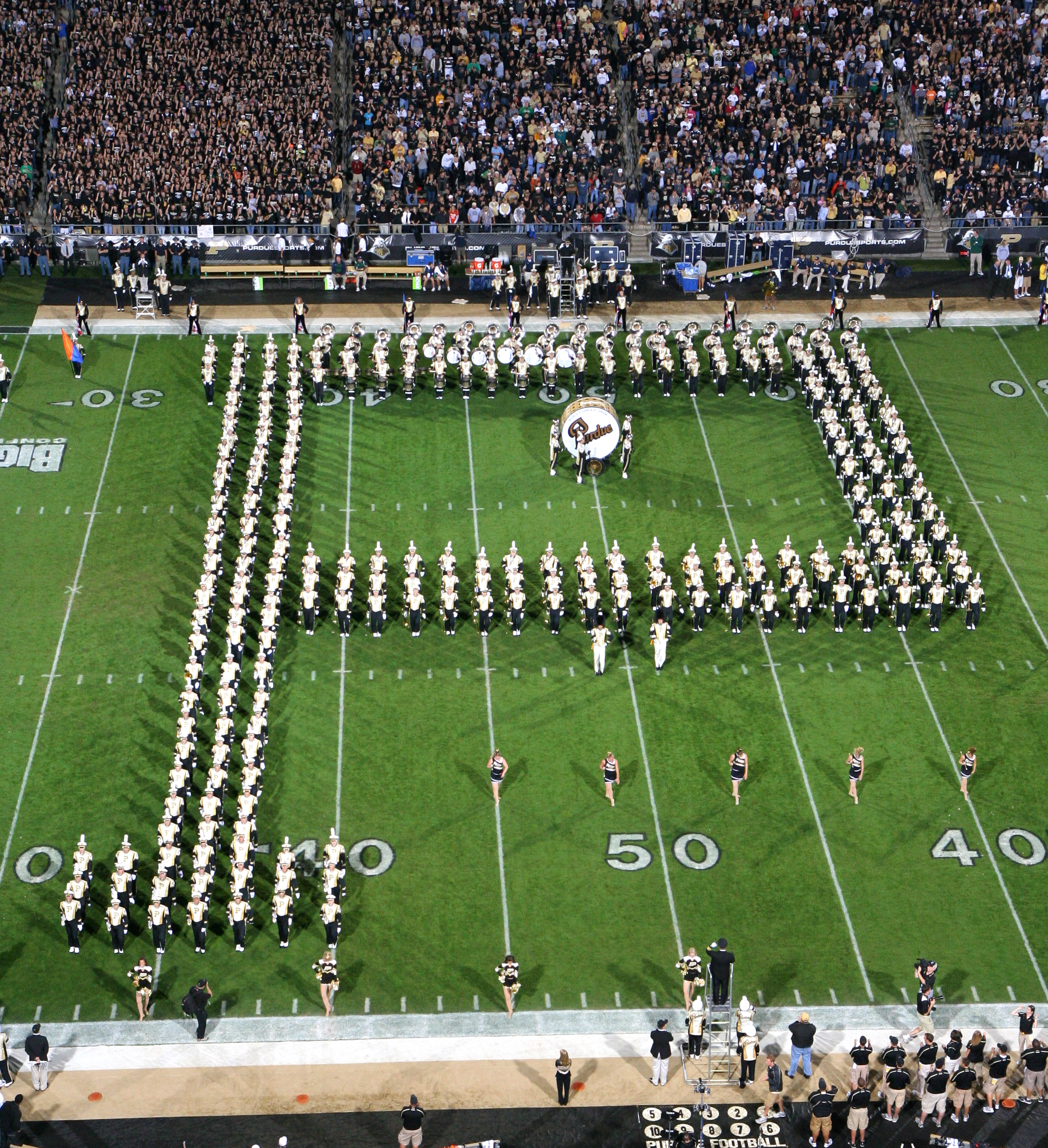
The oldest marching band formation, the "Block P"

The AAMB contains numerous woodwind, brass, percussion, and auxiliary members. In parade and block formation the wind instruments are organized into ranks of 10 people. The band currently contains 26 ranks of wind instruments. The percussion section consists of a drumline, two drum majors, and the World's Largest Drum along with its crew. Auxiliary performers are organized by their performance type. In addition, a section of eighteen Big Ten Flag carriers march with the band in parade and on the field.

- Woodwind Instruments
  - Piccolos
  - Clarinets
  - Alto Saxophones
  - Tenor Saxophones
- Brass Instruments
  - Trumpets
  - Mellophones
  - Trombones
  - Bass Trombones
  - Baritone Horns
  - Sousaphones
- Percussion
  - Snare Drums
  - Tenor Drums
  - Bass Drums
  - Cymbals
  - Drum Majors
  - World's Largest Drum (Big Bass Drum)
- Auxiliaries
  - All-American Twirlers (Majorette Line)
  - Golden Silks (Flag Corps)
  - Goldusters (Dancers/Pom Squad)
  - The Big Ten Flags
- Feature Twirlers
  - Golden Girl
  - Girl in Black
  - Miss Boilerette
  - Silver Twins

== Auditions ==
To gain admission to the "All-American" Marching Band each student must audition every year. Previous years membership does not guarantee a position in the band. Auditions are composed of a music audition followed by a week of marching auditions prior to the first week of classes. Student Leaders for each instrument section are selected by band staff to aid in the teaching of Purdue band marching fundamentals including the Big Ten conference's ubiquitous chair step.

== Notable alumni ==
- Neil Armstrong, astronaut, aviator, first man on the Moon. Armstrong played baritone horn with the AAMB in 1952. Armstrong was made an honorary member of Kappa Kappa Psi in 1965 and received the band department's Alumni Achievement Award in 1997. His Kappa Kappa Psi pin went with him to the Moon and is now on display at Purdue's Marc and Sharon Hagle Hall.
- Orville Redenbacher, businessman and agriculturalist, namesake of Orville Redenbacher's Gourmet Popping Corn. Redenbacher played tuba with the band in the 1920s.
- Russell Games Slayter, inventor of fiberglass. Slayter was a tuba player. The Slayter Center of Performing Arts, the site of the band's "Thrill on the Hill" football pep rallies, is a gift from Slayter and his wife.
