= Shipping Wars =

American reality television series (2012–2022)

- Intertitle
- Genre: Reality
- Starring: Roy Garber; Jarrett Joyce; Marc Springer; Jennifer Brennan; Suzanne Bawcom; Scott Bawcom; Christopher Hanna; Robbie Welsh; Dusty Davies; Jessica Samko; Todd Sturgis; Tamera Sturgis
- Country of origin: United States
- Original language: English
- No. of seasons: 9
- No. of episodes: 106 (list of episodes)

Production
- Executive producers: Elaine Frontain Bryant; Neil A. Cohen; Graham Davidson; Jeff Keels; David McKillop; Jonathan Nowzaradan; Tom Mireles
- Camera setup: Ryan Benton Miller
- Running time: 24 minutes
- Production company: Megalomedia

Original release
- Network: A&E
- Release: January 10, 2012 – January 25, 2022

Shipping Wars is an American reality television series that aired on A&E from January 10, 2012, to April 29, 2015. Season 9 premiered on November 30, 2021, with a new cast of shippers. The show follows various independent shippers who have discovered that money can be made transporting large/bulky/unusual items that traditional carriers either cannot or will not haul. They compete for shipments in timed auctions held by uShip, one of the largest online auction houses for independent shippers.

== Overview ==
In seasons 1–8, the shippers place bids on two shipments listed on uShip, in a reverse auction format. Bids are generally made with comments about the likely costs and risks, as well as the motives and abilities. When the time limit for an auction runs out, the job is typically awarded to the lowest bidder; at the client's discretion, however, it may be awarded to a higher bidder with a better average feedback rating from past clients. Feedback ratings are used to break any ties for the lowest bid. In season 9, the shippers receive their loads from a shipping broker, and the bidding process is not shown.

Winners load their cargo and attempt to deliver it intact by the client's or receiver's deadline. Feedback ratings from clients appear after the loads have been delivered. At the end of the episode, each shipper's revenue is tallied on-screen, with the expenses (fuel, labor, late-delivery penalties, fines, etc.) subtracted from the bid amount to determine the overall profit or loss. At times, a shipper will arrange to haul one or more additional loads on the same trip, with the extra money figured into their tally. In some cases, the shipper will be unable to complete a job because of concerns over load size/weight or road safety. On occasion, one shipper will enlist the services of another to help complete a job; the shippers then decide between themselves how to split the proceeds. In seasons 1–8, the progress of each shipment is interspersed with humorous criticisms from the other shippers.

== Episodes ==
Season	Episodes	Originally released	
Season	Episodes	First released	Last released
1	10	January 10, 2012	February 7, 2012
2	14	August 7, 2012	October 2, 2012
3	12	December 12, 2012	January 30, 2013
4	12	June 11, 2013	July 30, 2013
5	12	December 3, 2013	January 14, 2014
6	20	June 3, 2014	August 5, 2014
7	14	November 18, 2014	March 3, 2015
8	6	April 1, 2015	April 29, 2015
9	16	November 30, 2021	January 25, 2022

== Shippers ==
Shipper	Known As	Company Name	Seasons								
Shipper	Known As	Company Name	1	2	3	4	5	6	7	8	9
Roy Garber	"The Handyman"	Arbie's Team Transport	Main (Note: Episodes 1–2 of season 6 only. Roy Garber died on January 17, 2014 after suffering a heart attack and was rushed to an area hospital, where he died shortly after. However he had already filmed the first two episodes of the season.)								
Jarrett Joyce	"The Rookie"	Southern Shipping	Main								
Marc Springer	"The Big Rig"	Snortn' Boar Transport	Main								
Jennifer Brennan	"The Cowgirl"	Tie 'Em Down Transport	Main								
Suzanne and Scott Bawcom	"The Veterans"	Dream Time Transportation	Main								
Christopher Hanna and Robbie Welsh	"The Hotshot Couple"	Loaded Transport		Main (Note: Episodes 1–2 of season 6 only.)							
Dusty Davies	"The Prodigy"	Flatbed Express						Main (Note: Episodes 3–20 of season 6 only.)			
Jessica Samko	"The Road Warrior"	Deren. M Smith Transport						Main			
Todd and Tamera Sturgis	"The Double Threat"	He Is With Her Transport						Main			
Johnny Chavez	—N/a	Johnny Chavez Trucking Company			Guest	Recurring					
Chelsea Chirila and Courtney Carter	—N/a	2 Blondes & A Truck				Guest		Guest			
Kourtney Boden and Tish Boden	—N/a	MPR Express				Guest					
Chris Kikelhan	—N/a	Sundance Transport, Inc.						Guest	Recurring		
Dwight and Tyesha Fountain	—N/a	Tri-State Motor Transit Co.									Main
Natasha Schneider	—N/a	Silver Trucking LLC									Main
Doug Smith	—N/a	Ralph Smith Company									Main
Molly and Russell Rivero	—N/a	Dos Riveros Trucking LLC									Main
Tamara Brock	—N/a	Lewis & Lewis Logistics LLC									Main

== Reception ==
David Wiegand of the San Francisco Chronicle says the show is "well made and fun to watch". David Knowles of The Hollywood Reporter states, "Though the fast paced editing scheme manages to keep the point and click bidding from feeling as droll as Internet auctions are in real life, the relentlessly quick hits of dialog and action make the proceedings feel like a teaser rather than the actual program". Monica Hesse of The Washington Post states, "Shipping Wars is mostly about the perfectly packed trunk and the ecstasy of having not an inch to spare".

== International broadcasts ==
In the UK, Shipping Wars is broadcast on the History TV channels.

The series made its debut in Canada on OLN; it currently airs on CMT Canada. In India, this show is broadcast on History TV 18. The German network N24 broadcasts a dubbed version since April 2014. The France network 6ter broadcasts a French dubbed version since September 2015. In Australia, it is broadcast on the free-to-air channel 7mate.

== Shipping Wars UK ==
On 5 January 2014, Channel 4 aired the pilot of the UK version of Shipping Wars titled Shipping Wars UK. The format closely follows the US version. The pilot received over a million viewers and, on 9 April 2014, it was announced that 20 episodes had been commissioned. Each episode will run to 45 minutes and will be produced by Megalomedia. On 2 May 2016, a second series started on Channel 4, the second series let the shippers travel to different European countries.
