= Hail Purdue! =

Song
- Songwriter: James R. Morrison

Audio sample
- Recording of Hail Purdue, performed by Elliot Shaw & Quartette (1921): file; help

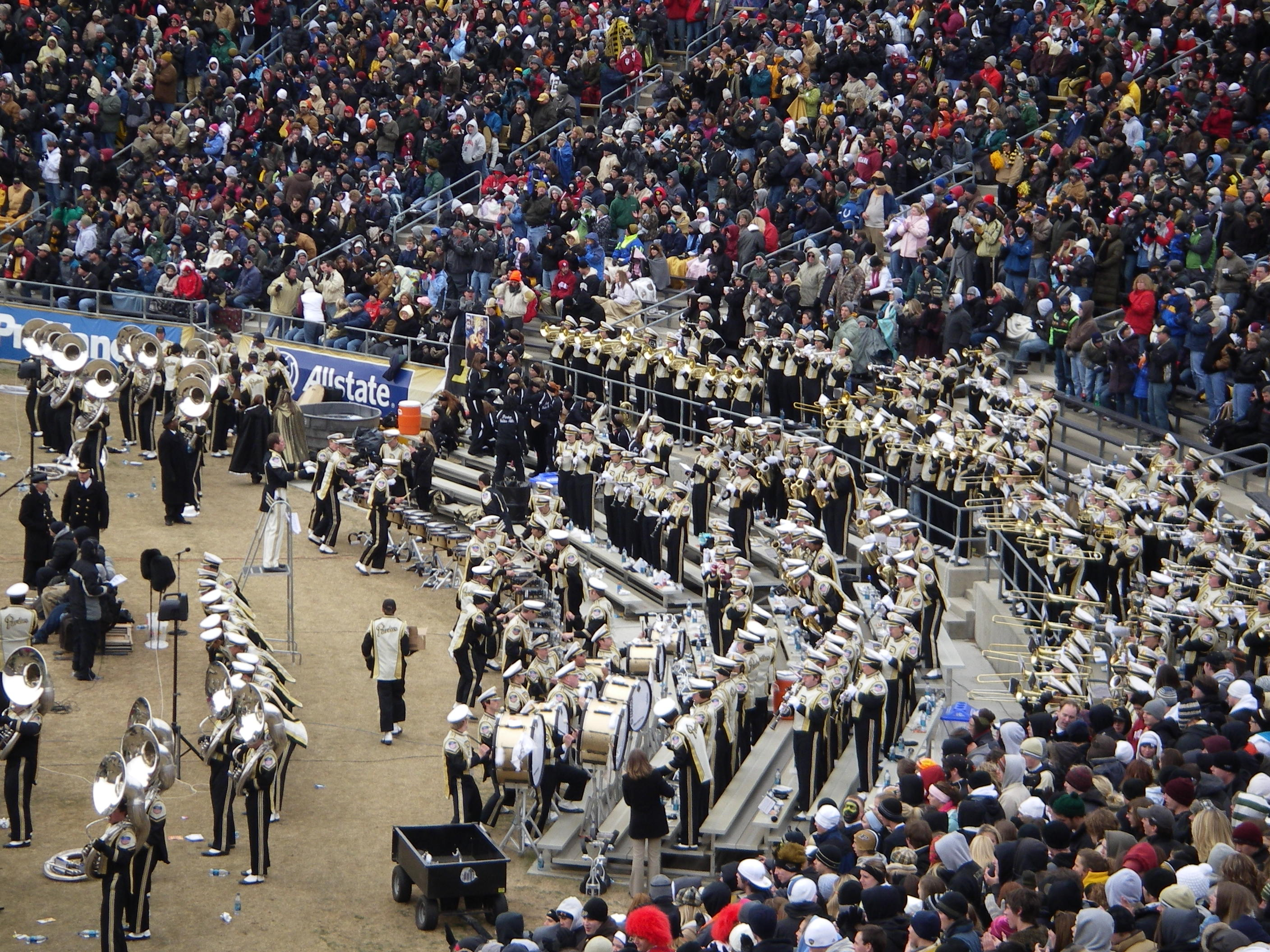
Purdue All-American Marching Band perform "Hail Purdue" at the 2008 Purdue-Indiana football game

"Hail Purdue!" is the official fight song of Purdue University. The lyrics were written in about 1912 by James R. Morrison (class of 1915), and set to music by Edward S. Wotawa (class of 1912). The completed song was published in 1913, initially titled "Purdue War Song". It was dedicated to the Purdue Varsity Glee Club, of which Wotawa was a student member and director. Until the adoption of the Purdue Hymn as the university anthem in 1993, it frequently served as both fight song and alma mater, being played on ceremonial occasions such as commencements.

During the rest following the lyric, "Thus we raise our song anew", it is popular to raise one fist and shout, "Boiler up!". This chant was invented by Arnette Tiller early in her husband's time as Purdue's head football coach (1997–2008). The Purdue All-American Marching Band interjects, "Fire up!" at the same point in the song, as they have traditionally done since the mid-1970s. Additionally, it has become popular to fill the rests of the remaining lines. Following the line, "All hail to our old gold and black!" one may shout, "Our gold and black!" Following the line, "Our friendship may she never lack," one may shout, "She never lacking!" Finally, following the line "All hail our own Purdue!" one may shout, "All Hail!"
