= List of drum manufacturers =

This is a list of some drum makers, including individuals and companies known for crafting drums and accessories, such as drum sticks. It encompasses defunct companies, as well as companies that produce instruments beyond drums, and manufacturers of cymbals, which are a common component of drum kits.

== A ==
- Adams Musical Instruments
- Alesis
- American Drum Manufacturing Company
- Axis Percussion
- Ayotte Drums

== B ==
- Brady Drum Company

== C ==
- Camco Drum Company
- Conn-Selmer
- Cumbus

== D ==
- D'Addario
- Ddrum
- Dixon Drums
- Drum Workshop (DW)

== E ==
- E-MU Systems
- Evans

== F ==
- Fibes Drums

== G ==
- Gibraltar Hardware
- Gretsch Drums

== H ==
- Harmony Company
- Hayman drum
- Hohner

== I ==
- Istanbul Agop

== J ==
- John Grey & Sons
- Jupiter Band Instruments

== K ==
- Gregg Keplinger
- KHS Musical Instruments
- King Conga

== L ==
- Latin Percussion
- Leedy Manufacturing Company
- Ludwig Drums

== M ==
- Majestic Percussion
- Mapex Drums
- Meinl Percussion

== N ==
- Natal Drums
- Noble & Cooley
- North Drums

== O ==
- Orange County Drum and Percussion

== P ==
- Pacific Drums and Percussion
- Paiste
- Pearl Drums
- Peavey Electronics
- Pork Pie Percussion
- Premier Percussion
- Pro-Mark

== R ==
- Remo
- Rogers Drums
- Roland Corporation

== S ==
- Sabian
- Simmons
- Slingerland Drum Company
- Sonor
- Soultone Cymbals

== T ==
- Tama Drums
- Trixon Drums

== U ==
- UFIP

== V ==
- Vater Percussion
- Vic Firth

== Y ==
- Yamaha Drums

== Z ==
- Zildjian
