= Walden Guitars =

Guitar manufacturer

- Company type: Private
- Industry: Musical instrument
- Founded: 1996; 30 years ago
- Founder: KHS Musical Instruments
- Key people: Jonathan Lee (President)
- Products: Acoustic guitars (steel-string, classical); Baritone guitars
- Website: waldenguitars.com

Walden Guitars is a guitar brand founded in 1996 by Jonathan Lee and KHS Musical Instruments and now owned by Jonathan Lee and Jaco Liao. Walden manufactures steel-string and classical guitars, and Baritone guitars.

== History ==
Walden Guitars were originally built in the small town of Lilan, nearby Langfang, China. Formed in 1996, Walden Guitars was a collaboration between CFox Guitars, Inc. luthiers Charles Fox and Jonathan Lee, and Taiwan instrument manufacturer KHS Musical Instruments. In 2019, Jonathan Lee, one of the original founders, and Jaco Liao, a long time member of the Walden Guitars team, obtained all rights to the Walden Guitars brand.
