= Herbert Couf =

American musician

Herb Couf
- Portrait from 1939

Background information
- Born: Herbert Couf; February 15, 1920
- Died: July 8, 2011 (aged 91) Michigan
- Occupations: Clarinetist, saxophonist, composer, music store owner, instrument manufacturer executive, mouthpiece innovator
- Formerly of: Detroit Symphony Orchestra

Herbert Couf (February 15, 1920 – July 8, 2011 in Michigan) was an American clarinetist, saxophonist, composer, music store owner, music instrument manufacturer executive, and an importer of music instruments. Couf had been the principal clarinetist with the Detroit Symphony Orchestra under Paul Paray until he retired to open Royal Music Center and commit his full attention to the business of music.

His Royal Music Center was located just north of Detroit. While owner of Royal Music Center he marketed H. Couf woodwind mouthpieces saxophones, and clarinets. H. Couf saxophones were made by the Julius Keilwerth company of West Germany. H. Couf clarinets were made by the Artley Company, a division of C. G. Conn. Couf later became Vice President of W. T. Armstrong Company, Inc., a manufacturer of flutes, to which he sold the rights to the H. Couf. brand name. The W. T. Armstrong Company was acquired by C. G. Conn in 1981. Couf also had been the conductor of the Royal Oak Concert Band, Royal Oak, Michigan.

== Earlier years ==
Couf performed with the Pittsburgh Symphony Orchestra and the Baltimore Symphony Orchestra.

== Compositions & publications ==
- Introduction, Dance, and Furioso, solo saxophone in three movements (1959) OCLC 222311603 OCLC 35706846 OCLC 212377317 OCLC 39867528
- Concertos for clarinet, for B♭ clarinet with piano accompaniment, transcribed by Herbert Couf, Charles H. Hansen Music Company, publisher (1946) OCLC 51480408

1. Concerto in E♭ major, Beethoven
2. Concerto in E minor, Chopin
3. Concerto in A minor, Grieg
4. Concerto in E♭ major, Liszt
5. Concerto in E-minor (violin), Mendelssohn
6. Concerto in D minor, Mozart
7. Concerto in C minor, Rachmaninoff
8. Concerto in D minor, Rubinstein
9. Concerto in A minor, Schumann
10. Concerto in B♭ minor Tschaikowsky

- Learning the Saxophone: A Sound and Correct Beginning Foundation, Armstrong Pub. Co. (1975) OCLC 19774069 LCCN 89-751352
- Bach Miniatures, Twelve Easy Arrangements for Clarinet, arranged by Herbert Couf & Frank Henri Klickmann (1885–1966), Charles H. Hansen Music Company, publisher (1950) OCLC 744667198

From the Clavecin book of Anna Magdalena Bach by Johann Sebastian Bach

- Let's Play Clarinet (16 lessons & short compositions, focusing on fingering & technique), by Herb Couf, Experience/Chappell Music (1974) OCLC 4644251
- Let's Play Saxophone (16 lessons & short compositions, focusing on fingering & technique), by Herb Couf, Experience/Chappell Music (1973) OCLC 4644261

== Discography ==
- Caprice, original compositions & arrangements for solo saxophone, Jāmal Rossi, saxophone Open Loop – a private label of Dorn Publications, Medfield, Massachusetts (1995) OCLC 33199607

Includes Introduction, Dance, and Furioso

== H Couf stenciled instruments ==
1965–1980s

- Saxophone; soprano, alto pictures, tenor, bari: Superba I (pro model with an F# key) – manufactured by Keilwerth and similar to its Toneking Special

- rolled tone holes for alto and tenor.
- elegant, soldered, bell brace
- full bell & bow engraving
- lyre holder part of mouthpipe socket clamp mechanism (except soprano)
- neck upper octave key made from thick square brass rod
- bow soldered directly to bow via an expanded section
- no rings used to combine sections
- early superba 1s do not have a high F# key; mid-early Superba 1s have a high F# key
- early and mid-early superba I & IIs have a RH see-saw type F# key: later Superba I & IIs have a levered F# key
- all post to body construction (no ribs)
- early saxes had a removable metal thumbrest; late model sopranos and altos had plastic thumbrests; the plastic thumbrest had a 2 point connection; this prevented breaking which was a problem on Selmer models at that time

- Saxophone; soprano, alto, tenor, baritone, bass: Superba II (pro model with an F# key) – manufactured by Keilwerth and similar to its Toneking

- straight tone holes throughout the range of saxes plus the Superba 1 soprano.
- single rod bell brace
- bell engraving
- lyre holder soldered on separately below the mouthpipe socket sleeve
- neck upper octave key made from round brass wire
- bow soldered directly to bow via and expanded section. Bow soldered directly to body via an expanded section.
- no rings used to combine sections
- early and mid-early Superba I & IIs have a right-hand see-saw type F# key; later Superba I & IIs have a levered F# key
- all post to body construction (no ribs)
- all thumbrests were metal and soldered in a permanent position on the body

For a few years the Superbas were available in black lacquer. The engraving was done after the lacquer which provided a stunning visual effect of being able to see the engraving from a distance. These models had metal thumbrests and were probably late 70's models.

- Saxophone; alto & tenor: Royalist and Royalist II (intermediate models) – manufactured by Armstrong in Elkhart and were similar to Keilwerth's New King

== Family ==
Herbert Couf was born to Morris Couf (1889 Bogoslov, Kiev Governorate, Russian Empire – 1961 Atlantic City, New Jersey) and Rebeca (née Rivka Nedelman; 1896 Russian Empire – 1981 Atlantic City, New Jersey) — Morris and Rebeca were married November 15, 1917, in Manhattan, New York City. Morris Couf had become a naturalized citizen March 1, 1916, in New York.

Herbert Couf was married to Miriam ("Mickey") Couf (née Miriam Tyba Kohn; 1924–2013). They had two daughters, Karen Eve Couf (born 1957; married to Gerald Irwin Cohen, MD) and Donna Andrea Couf (born 1959; married to Armando Garcia Reyes). Herbert Couf also had two brothers, Norman Couf (1925–2008) and Albert B. Couf (1931–2004).

== Videography ==
- "Herbert Couf - A Lifetime in Music," via YouTube
