= Drumhead =

Membrane stretched over the ends of a drum

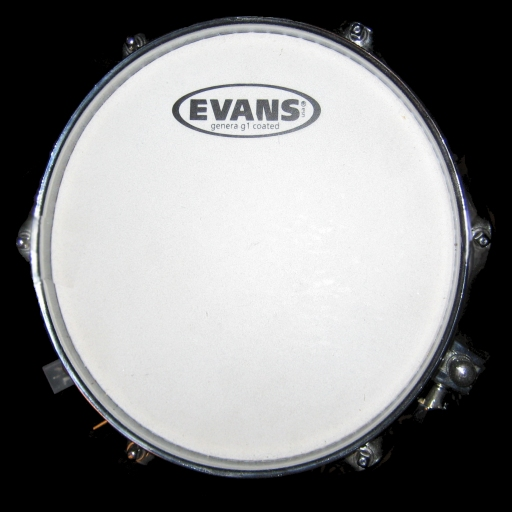
Drumhead with coating on a snare drum

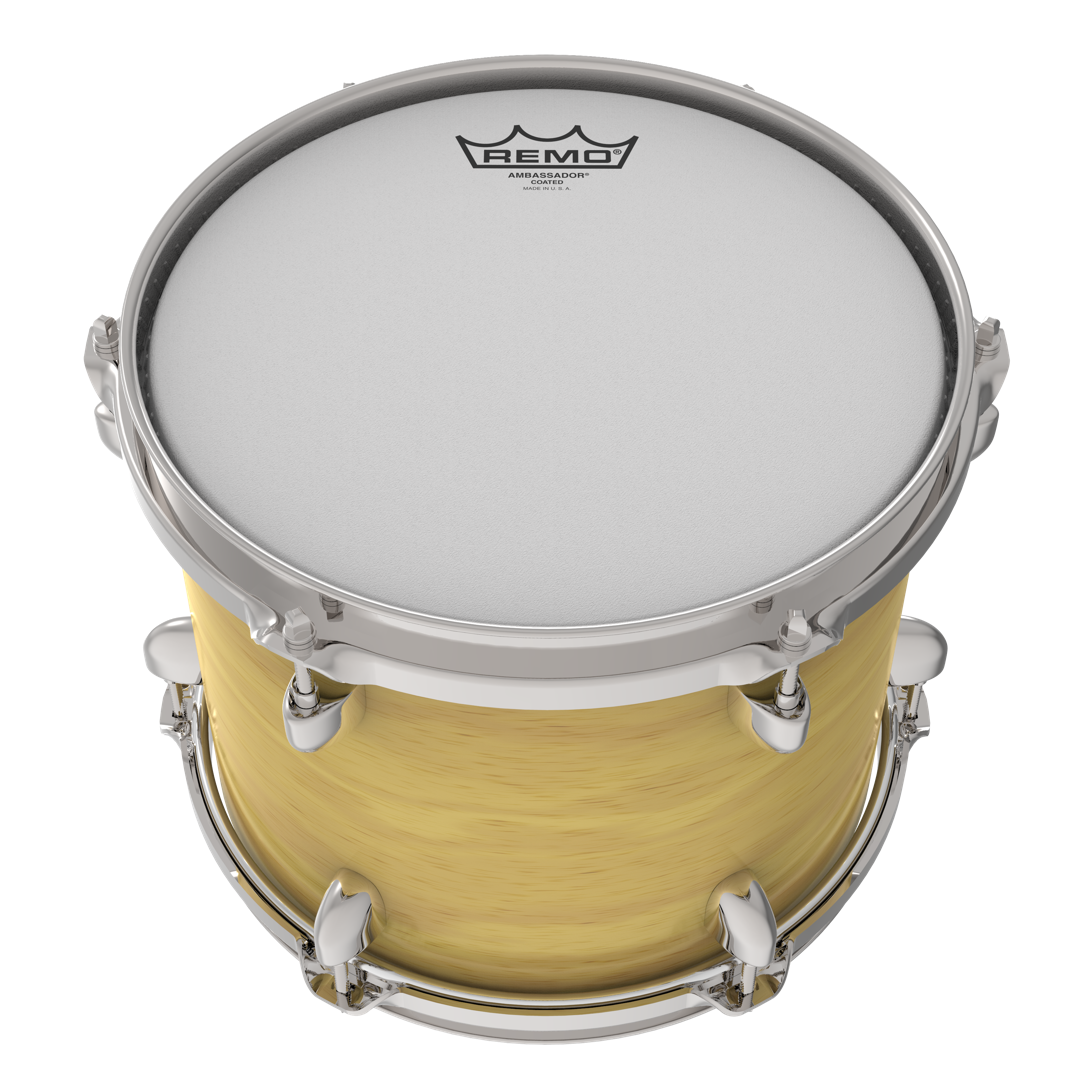
Drumhead with coating on a tom drum

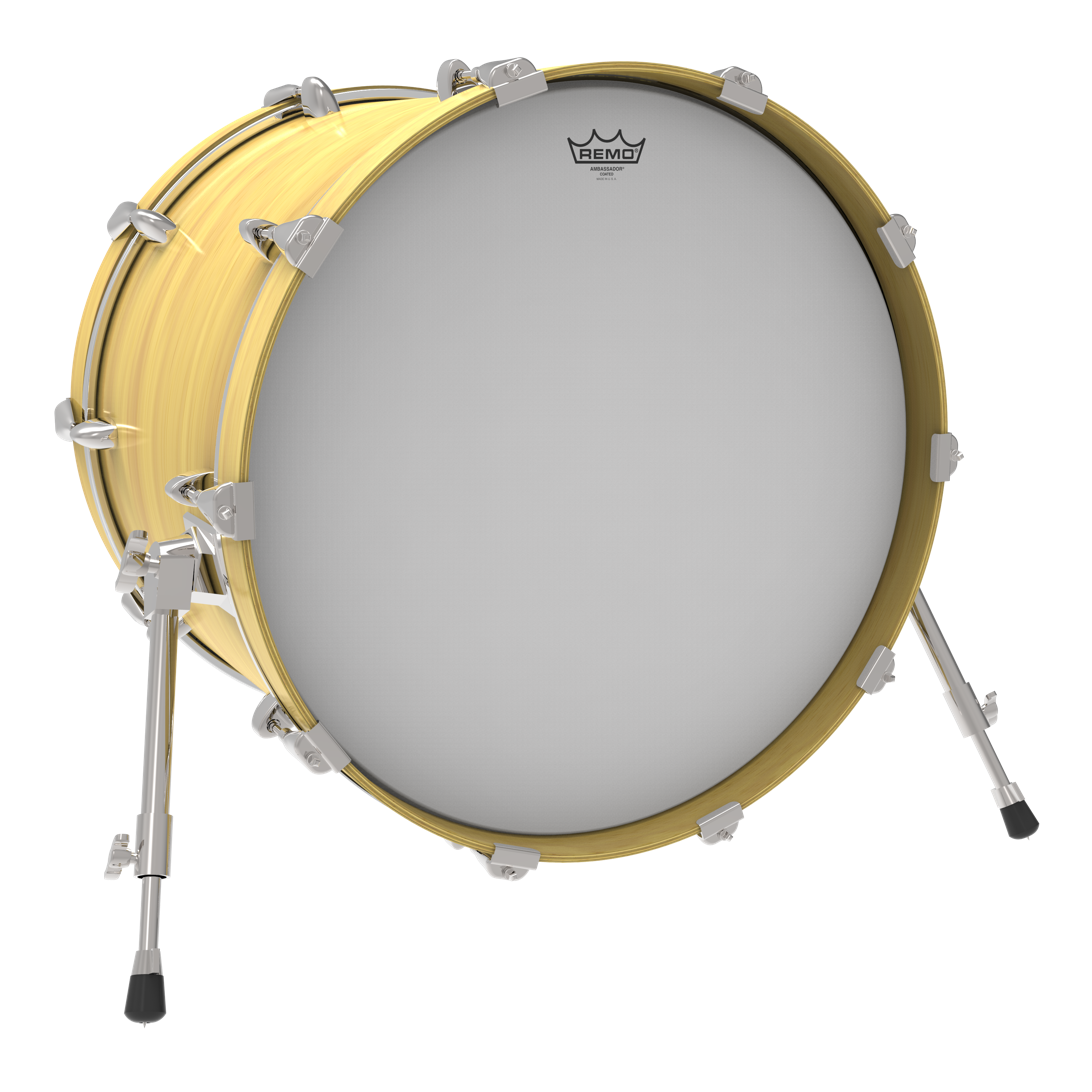
Drumhead with coating on a bass drum

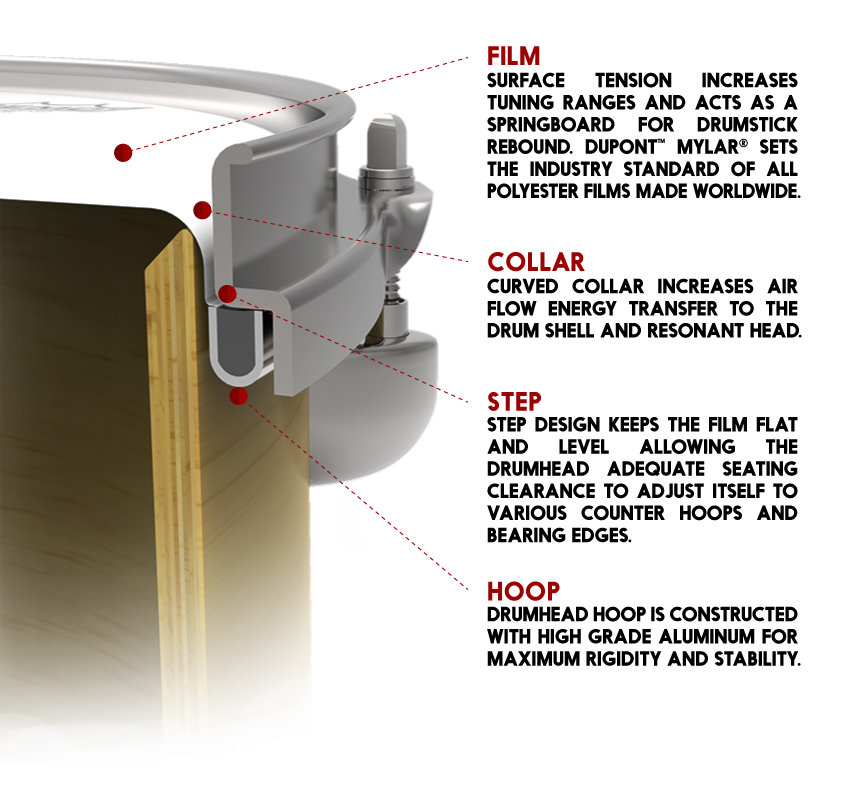
Anatomy of a drumhead for drumming

A drumhead or drum skin is a membrane stretched over one or both of the open ends of a drum. The drumhead is struck with sticks, mallets, or hands, so that it vibrates and the sound resonates through the drum.

Additionally outside of percussion instruments, drumheads are also used on some string instruments, most notably the banjo.

== History ==
Originally, drumheads were made from animal hide and were first used in early human history, long before records began. The term drumhead is first attested in English in 1580, in the writings of the soldier Thomas Churchyard, who mentioned how "Dice plaie began ... on the toppe of Drommes heddes".

In 1956, Chick Evans invented the plastic drumhead. Plastic drumheads made from polyester are cheaper, more durable, and less sensitive to weather than animal skin. In 1957, Remo Belli and Sam Muchnick together developed a polymer head (also known as Mylar) leading to the development of the Remo drumhead company.

Despite the benefits of plastic heads, drummers in historical reenactment groups such as fife and drum use animal skin heads for historical accuracy. Rawhide heads are also popular with musicians performing in the jazz, orchestral and early music genres due to their preference for period correct sounds and instruments. Real hide heads are used on most hand drums, including djembes, frame drums, bongos, and congas, and also some banjos. In recent years, companies have begun manufacturing synthetic counterparts (most notably FiberSkyn) for certain hand drums such as congas, and also banjos. There has also been a resurgence in the use of genuine rawhide heads by drum kit players, with companies such as AF cueros orquestales from Argentina, AK Drums, Buchler Trommelbau and Kentville Drums or the Austrian Drumhead Company offering goat, calf and kangaroo hide drumheads respectively.

Another common material used for drumheads is aramid fiber, such as kevlar. Kevlar heads are also used in marching percussion.

=== Mesh heads ===
Mesh heads—drum heads that are usually constructed from a weave of synthetic material—were traditionally used on electronic drums, as they provide a very similar playing feel to traditional heads. Over time, however, manufacturers began to produce mesh heads that are attachable to acoustic drums, in order to create a playing experience that has a very similar feel and sound to playing a traditional drumkit, but at a drastically reduced volume, making them suitable for either practicing in a place where noise is a concern, or even recording using drum triggers.

== Tuning ==
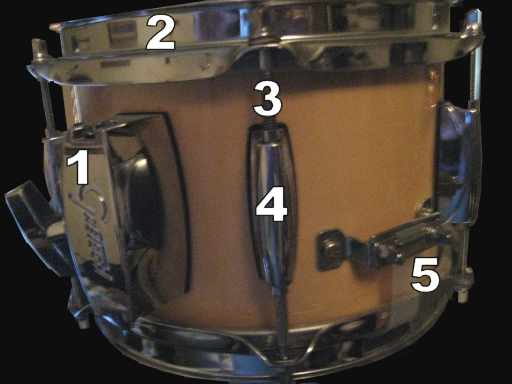
1 Holder clamp, 2 Rim, 3 Tension rod, 4 Lug, 5 Snare butt

A drum "hoop" or "rim" may be made of metal, wood, or other material and is used to hold a drumhead against a drum shell, either with bolts through metal "claws" attached directly to a hoop, or bolts through holes in a flanged rim. The bolts, called "tension rods", are screwed into threaded "lugs" attached to the drum shell, in order to tighten and tune the drumhead. A "drum key" is a four sided wrench used to screw the tension rods into the lugs.

== Muffling ==
Drummers occasionally muffle their drums using special drumheads. Some drumheads come pre-muffled. Most muffling is done by external muffles.

== See also ==
- Vibration of a circular membrane, for an illustrated mathematical treatment
- List of drum manufacturers
