= King Conga =

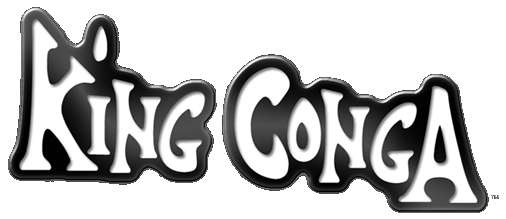
Logo.

King Conga was a Fremont, California based percussion manufacturing company founded by Cirilo "Mitch" Basas in the late 1960s. They were one of the first companies to produce fiberglass congas and although the company was only around for a few years, these drums are still considered some of the best sounding conga drums ever produced. The original endorser for King Conga was the great conguero Armando Peraza.

King Conga produced four original sizes - Requinto (9.5"), Quinto (10.5"), Conga (11.5"), Tumba (12.5"). All of the hardware and fiberglass design & fabrication was done by Mitch and his partner Ray McGinnis in their shop in Fremont, CA. Ray McGinnis also painted most of the artwork on each drum.

The company ceased operations in the early 1970s after only producing approximately 2,000 drums since its inception.

== See also ==
- List of drum makers
