= Saxophone tone hole =

Tone holes that exist in the body and bell of a saxophone

Saxophone tone holes are tone holes that exist in the body and bell of a saxophone. They are strategically placed in order to achieve a variety of notes while holding the best possible intonation.

== Varieties ==
There are two varieties of tone holes, straight and rolled. Straight tone holes are much more prevalent, but rolled tone holes are favored by some saxophonists as they supposedly produce a different timbre of sound. An American company based in Elkhart, Indiana named "Martin" manufactured saxophones with straight toneholes that were tapered, i.e. the circumference of the tone-hole chimneys was smaller at the point of contact with the leather pads than where they were soldered to the main body of the instrument.

Instruments with rolled toneholes have been manufactured by companies including Conn (between 1921 and 1947), Keilwerth, Kohlert and SML (Strasser-Marigaux-Lemaire). As of 2010, there are only two companies manufacturing rolled tone hole saxophones: Keilwerth and P. Mauriat. They each have their own ways of making their rolled tone holes. P. Mauriat’s tone holes are formed from the saxophone’s existing material. In other words, they are rolled from the instruments original tone hole. Keilwerth uses a rolled cap that is soldered onto the saxophone’s straight tone hole. Each process affects the sound differently.

== Conn Res-o-Pads ==
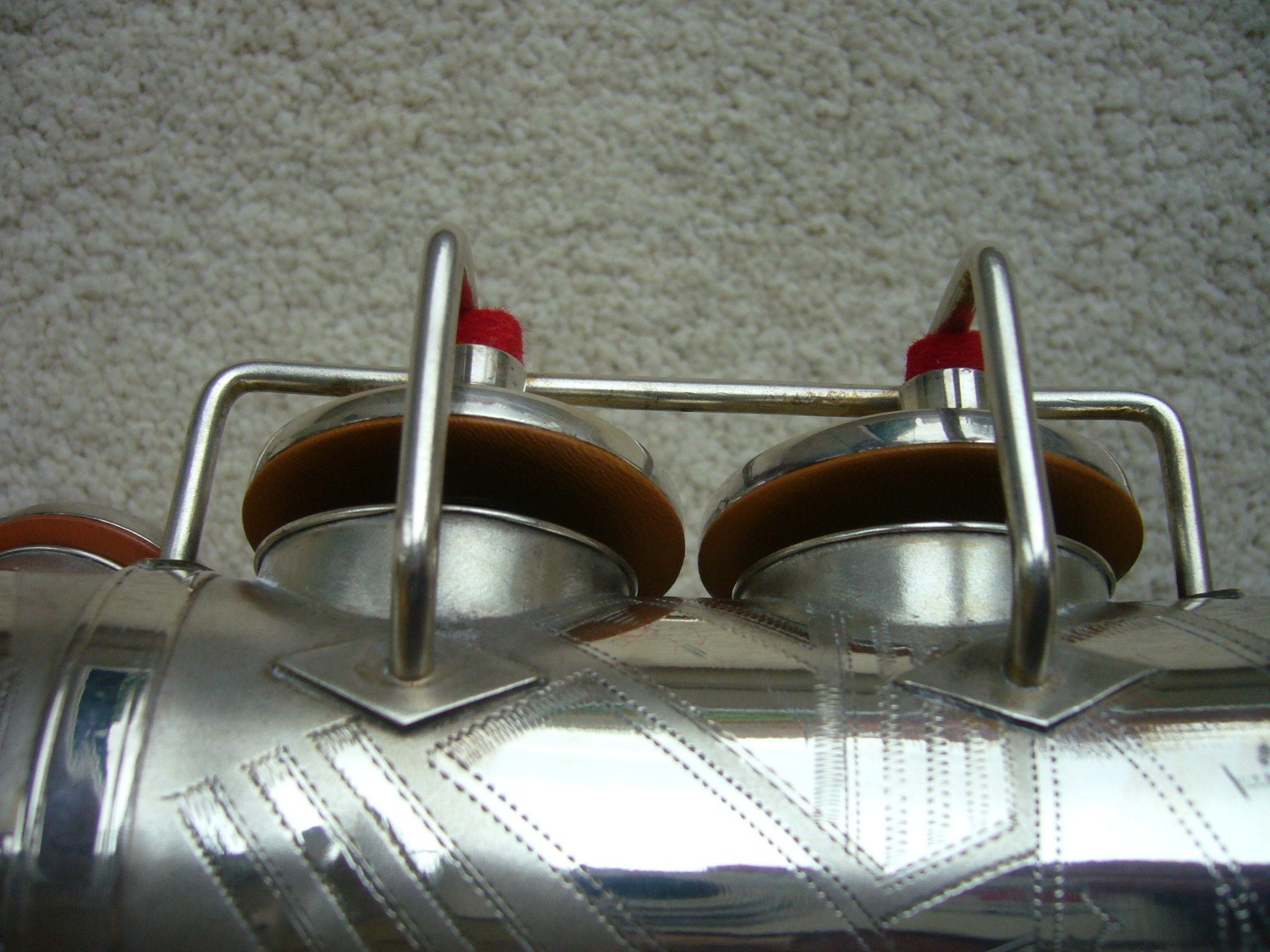
Conn "Res-O-Pads" fitted to the bell-keys on a Selmer 'Pennsylvania Special' alto, made by Kohlert (Czechoslovakia) in 1938. Note that this instrument has rolled toneholes and that the edge of the pad extends over the rim of the key-cup

During the 1920s, C.G. Conn developed a special type of saxophone pad specifically designed for use on saxophones with rolled toneholes called Conn "Res-o-Pads". These have an internal metal reinforcing ring which is hidden under the leather covering around the circumference of the pad. Their most notable feature is that the diameter of the pad extends over the rim of the key-cup, thereby giving a slightly wider surface area for the rolled tone-hole to seal onto. Rim impressions from Res-o-Pads are minimal.

Unlike standard pads, Res-o-Pads cannot be "floated" into key-cups, as they are sized in 1/32nd-of-an-inch steps (unlike standard saxophone pads which come in 0.5 mm size steps) which may not always correspond closely to key-cup diameters. Though designed to fix into key-cups purely by friction, most saxophone repairers glue them in place using shellac or hot melt adhesive.

Newly produced Conn Res-o-Pads are still available from specialist suppliers, and are favored by some saxophone collectors because they give a fully authentic look and feel to vintage saxophones with rolled toneholes. It is possible, however, to fit standard pads to any saxophone with rolled toneholes (and many people do) without any noticeable disadvantage regarding the quality of sound produced.

== Gallery ==
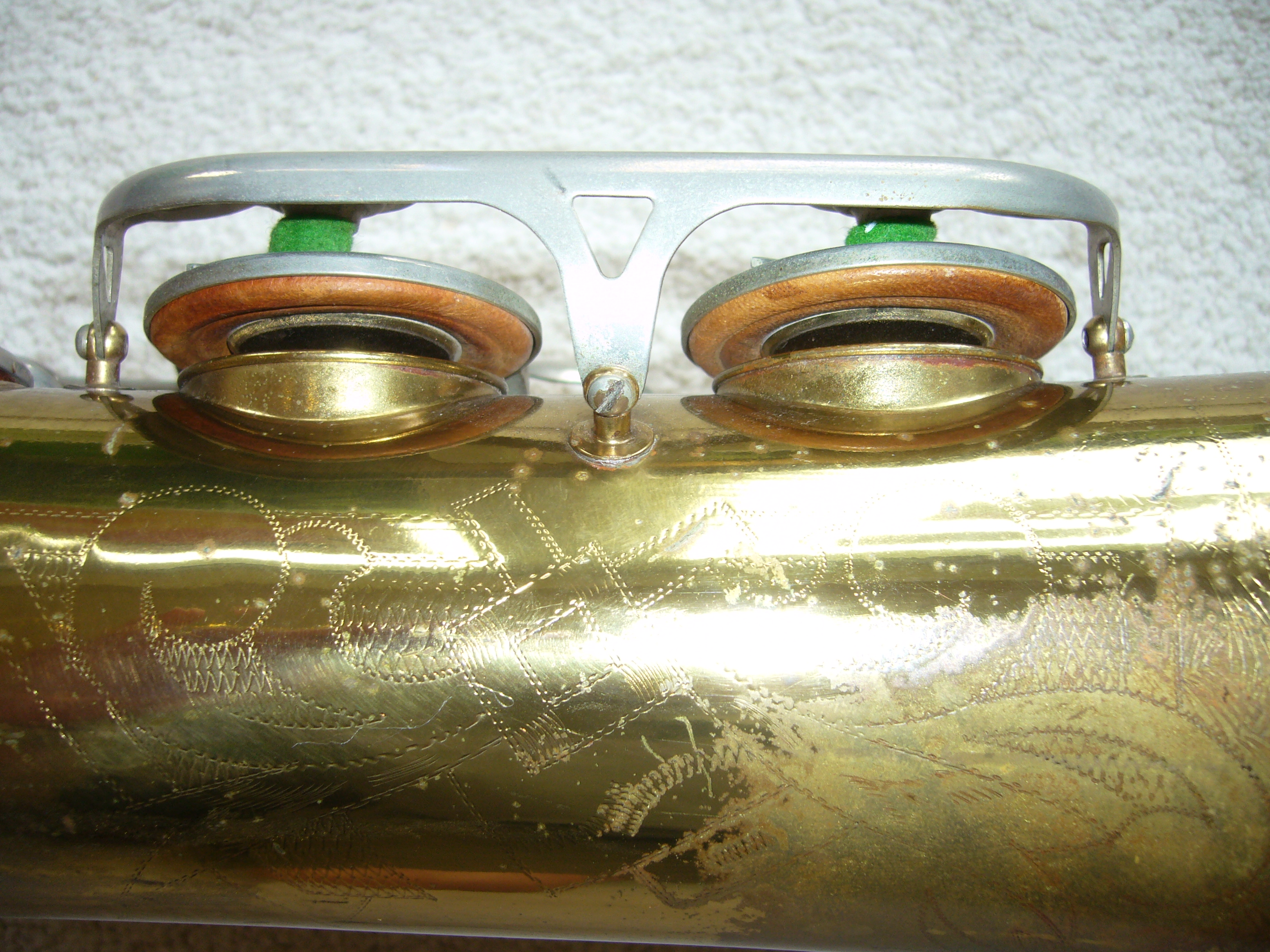
Rolled tone holes on the bell of a 'Boucet' tenor saxophone, made by Dörfler & Jörka in Nauheim, Germany circa 1963

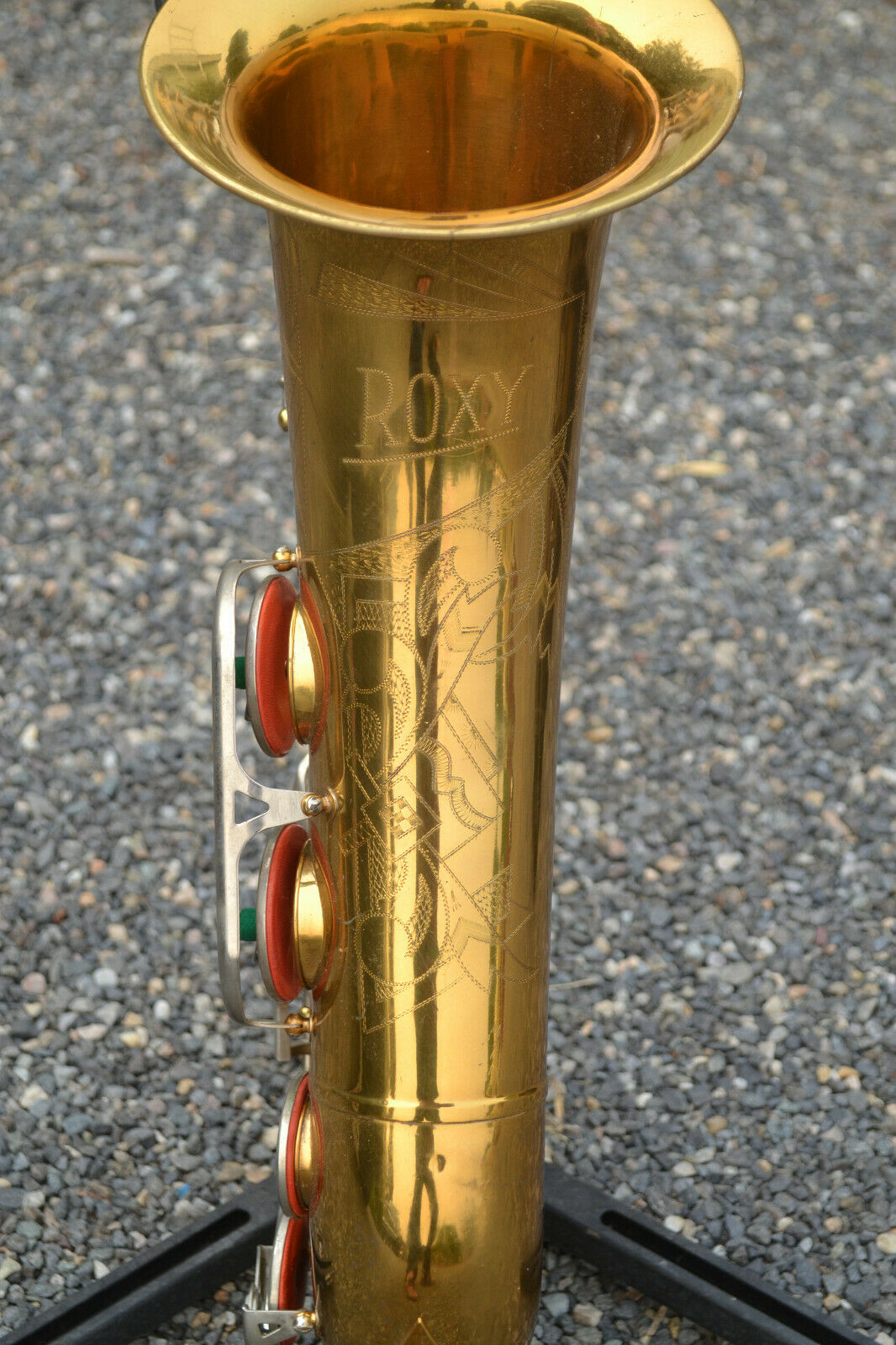
Rolled tone holes on the bell of a 'Roxy' tenor saxophone, made by Dörfler & Jörka in Germany circa 1955

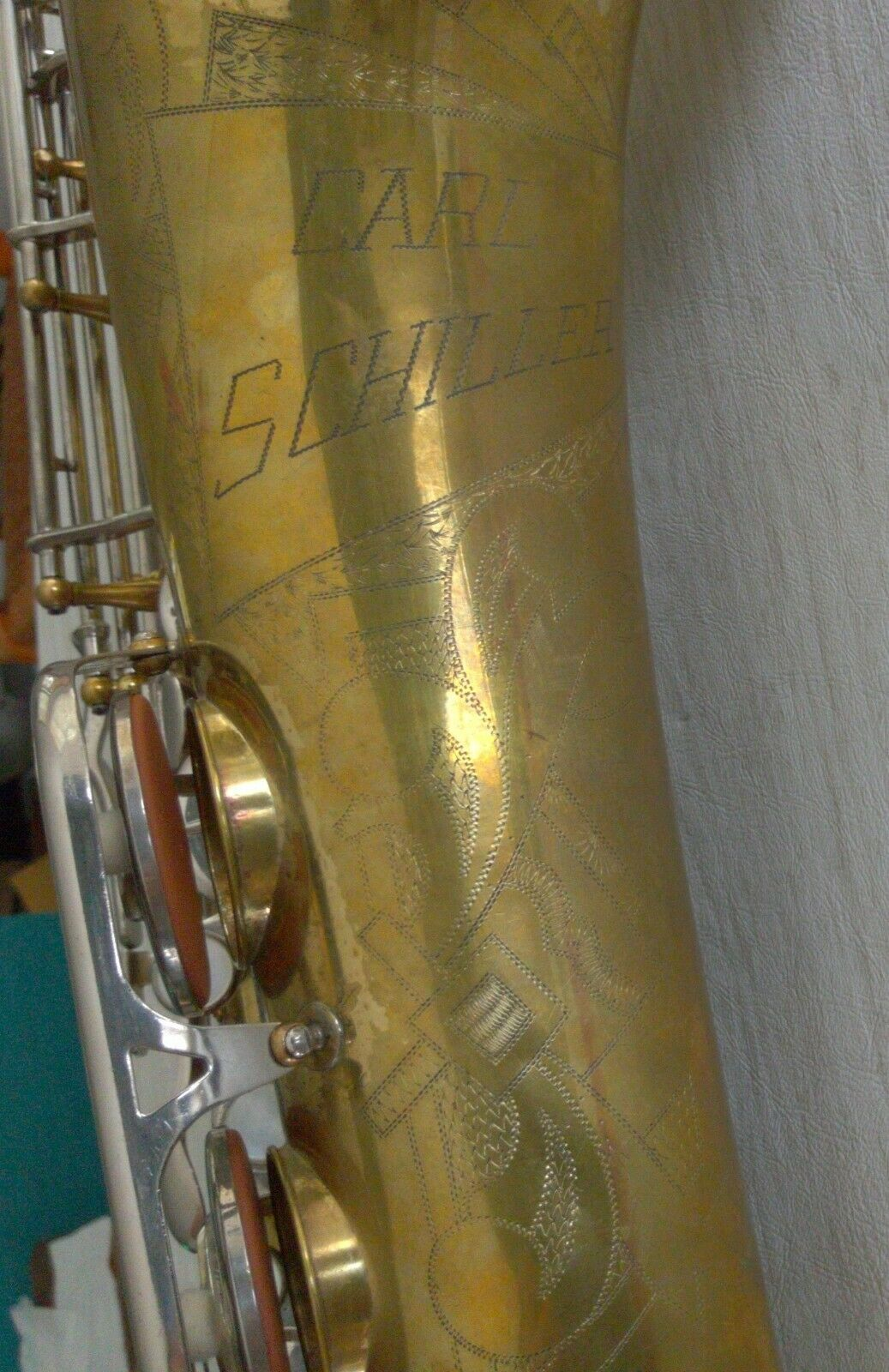
Rolled tone holes on the bell of a 'Carl Schiller' tenor saxophone, made by Dörfler & Jörka in Germany circa 1960s

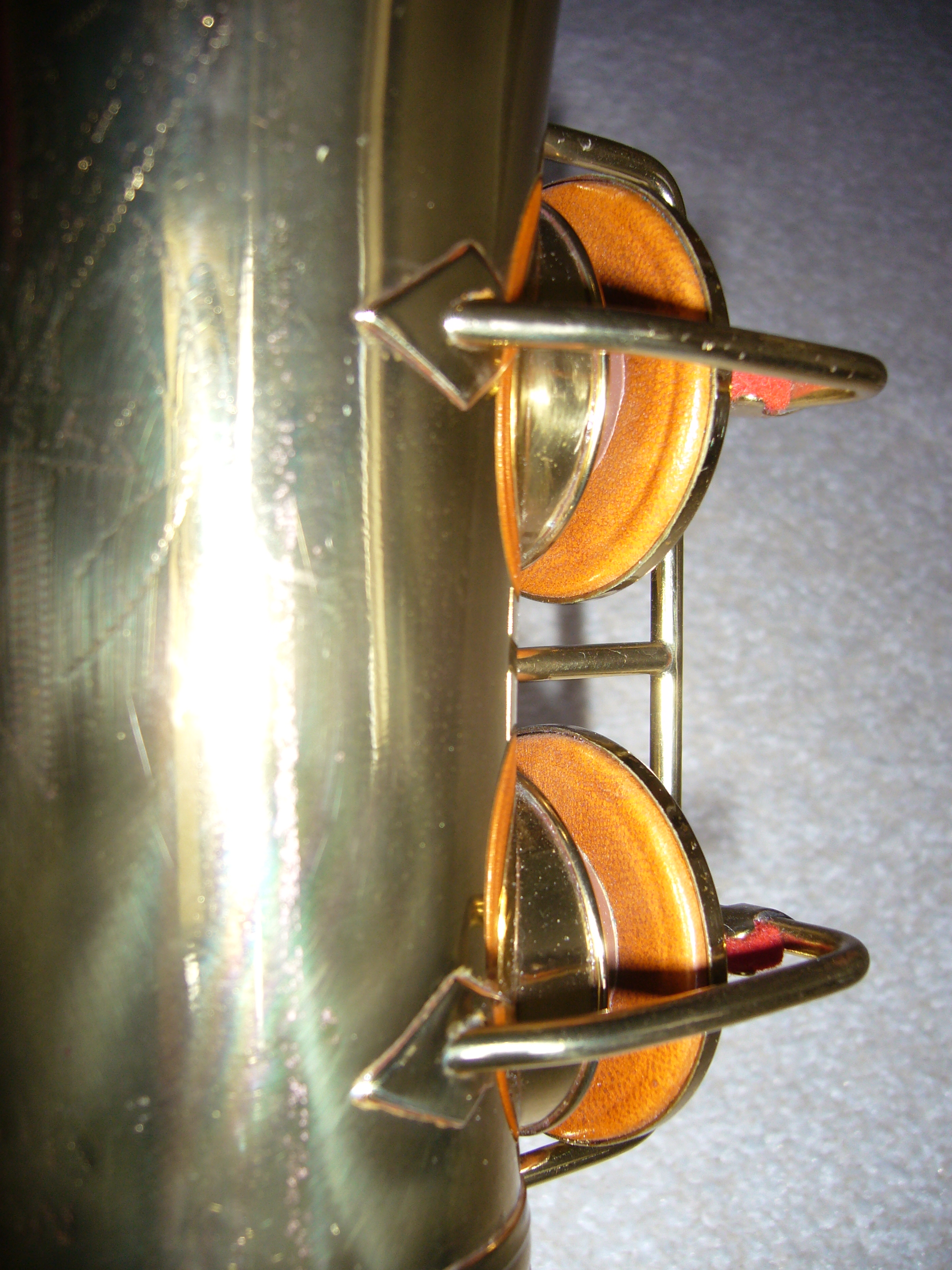
Detail of a Conn 6M alto saxophone made during the 1930s, showing rolled tone holes. Note that Conn Res-o-Pads have not been fitted to this instrument.

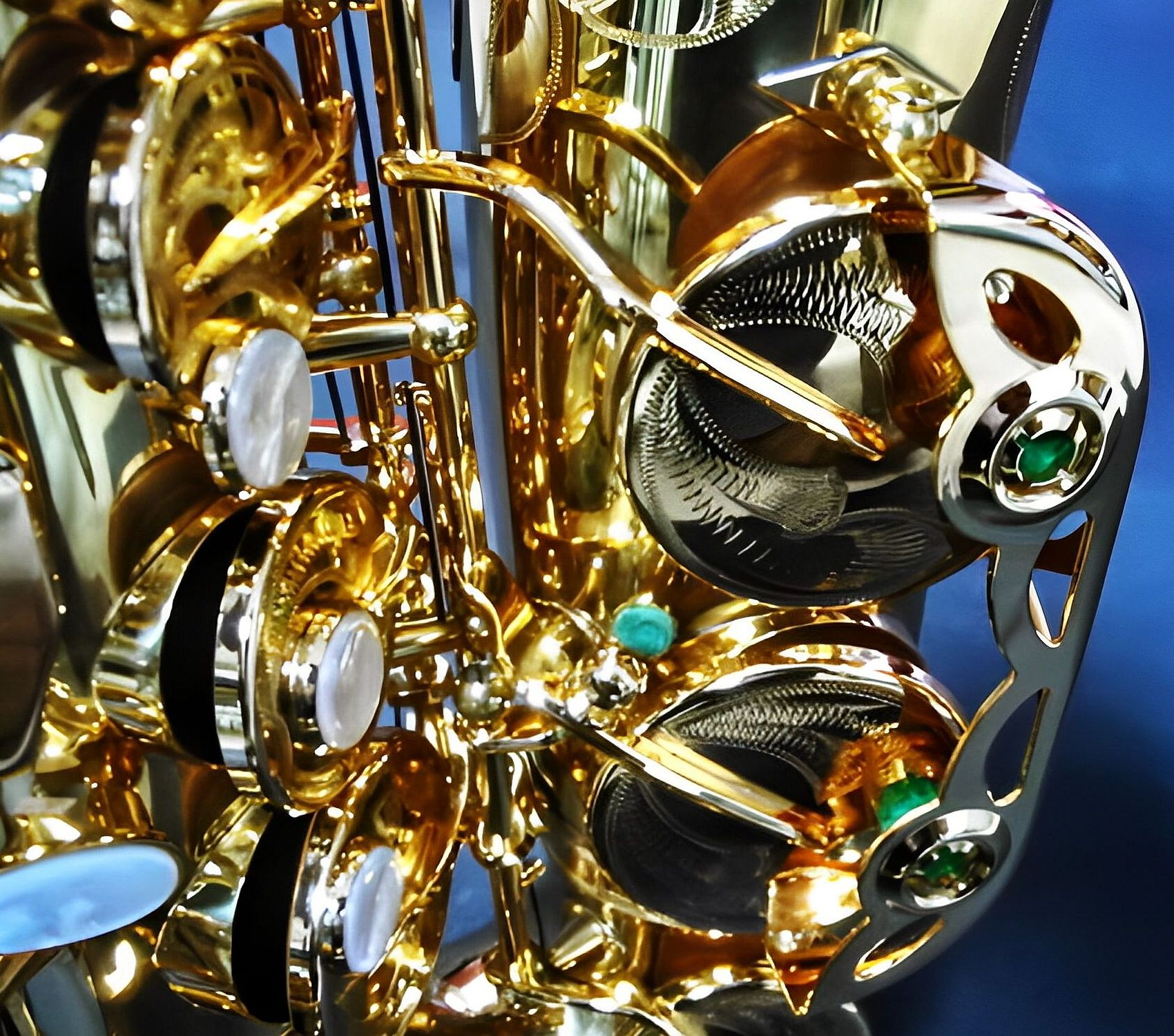
P. Mauriat saxophone with straight tone holes

P. Mauriat saxophone with rolled tone holes

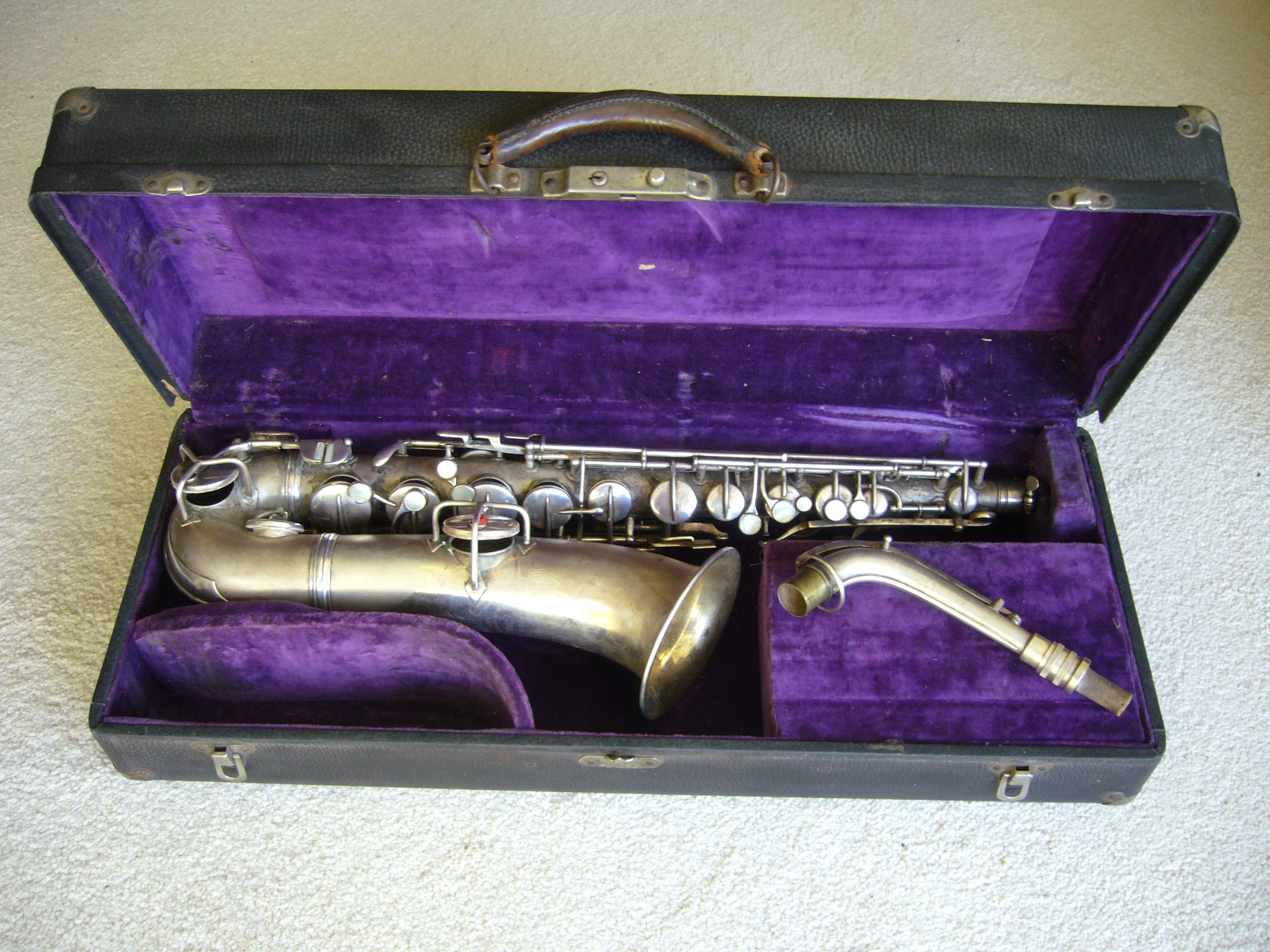
A straight-necked Conn C melody saxophone dated 1922. Rolled tone holes are visible on the bell
