= Remo =

American musical instrument company

Remo Inc.
- Industry: Musical instrument
- Founded: 1957; 69 years ago
- Founder: Remo Belli
- Headquarters: 28101 Industry Drive; Valencia, California 91355
- Key people: Dr. Ami Belli CEO Robert Shen President
- Products: Drum kits, heads, hardware, surdos, tambourines, congas, gong drums, bongos, frame drums, rototoms, djembes, ocean drums, doumbeks, talking drums, cajóns, cuicas, banjo heads
- Revenue: US$47.5 million (2008 est.)
- Number of employees: 300
- Website: remo.com

Remo Inc. is an American musical instruments manufacturing company based in Valencia, California, and founded by Remo Belli in 1957. Products manufactured include drum kits, drumheads, drums, and hardware, and various percussion instruments.

== History ==
Drummer and founder Remo D. Belli experimented with PET film as a possible material for the production of drumheads after World War II due to its consistency in tonal qualities and resistance to weather changes. Throughout the 1960s, it was a fight to gain market acceptance, as purist jazzmen preferred the sound of natural calfskin. However, these calfskin drumheads had to be frequently tuned with weather fluctuations. Remo Belli created convenience for professional drummers when he pioneered the use of Mylar, a synthetic polyester film for drumheads. Originally, the drumheads were white and opaque to help mimic the look of calfskin. Later innovations were clear drumheads, two-ply drumheads (for added durability and depth), and simulated natural drumheads with a product called "FIBERSKYN", which is currently on its third version. Remo Belli died on April 25, 2016.

== Drumheads ==
Remo supplies drumheads for various drum companies including Pearl, DW Drums, Yamaha, Mapex, Pork Pie Percussion, Tama Drums, Ludwig Drums, Gretsch Drums and Sonor. Remo has factories in the US and in Taiwan, where the "UT" and "US" versions are made.

Remo Drumhead

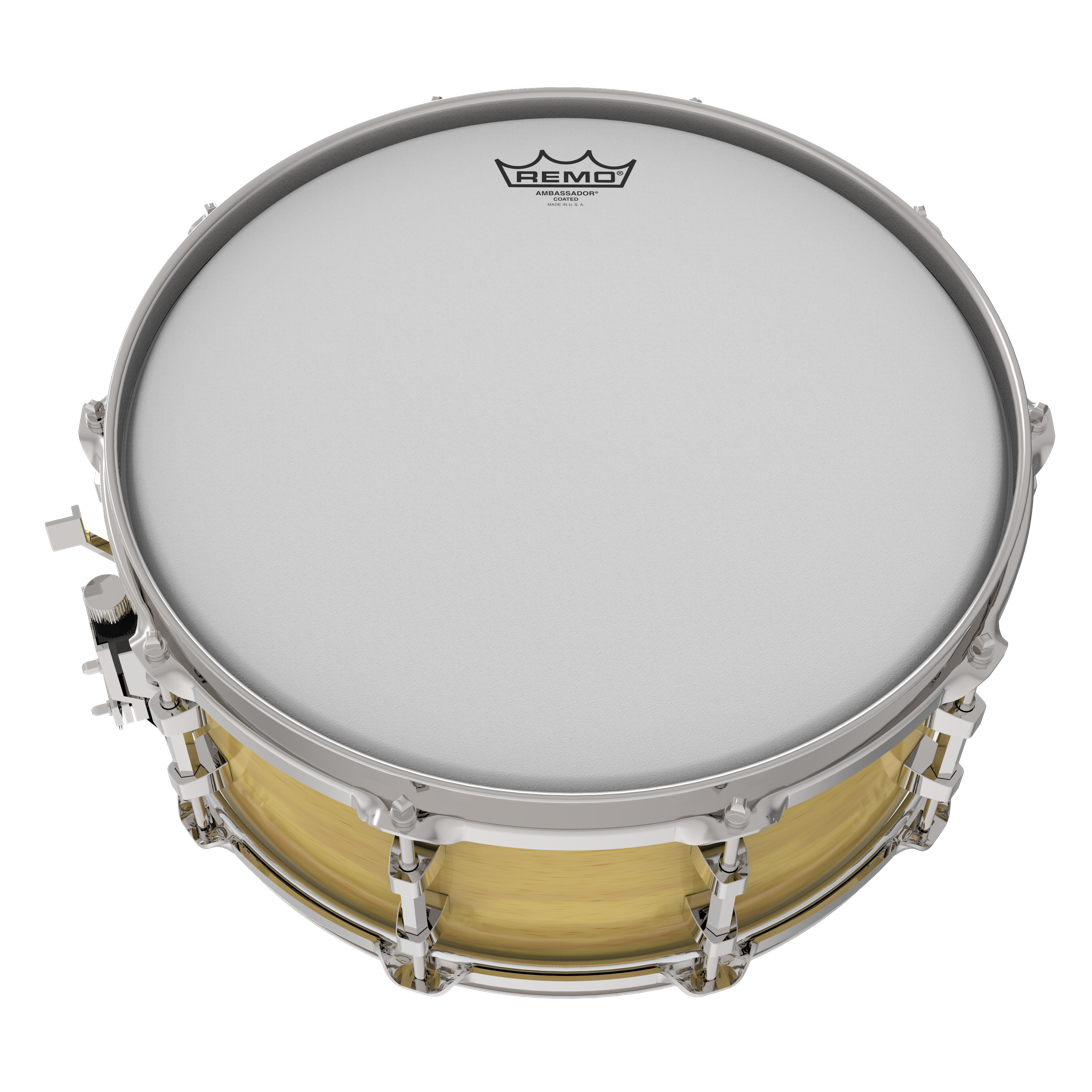
Remo Ambassador Coated drumhead on Snare Drum

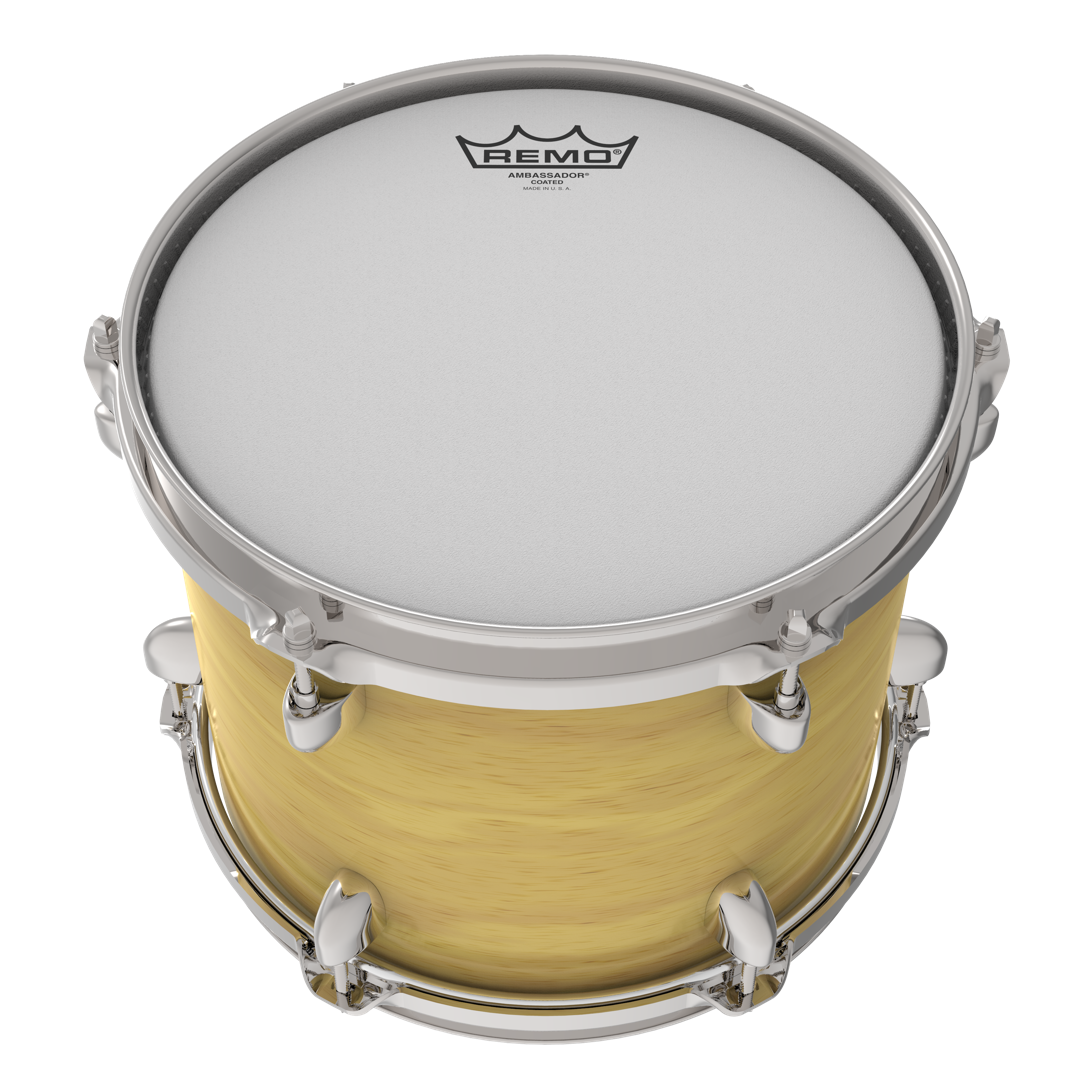
Remo Ambassador Coated drumhead on Tom-Tom Drum

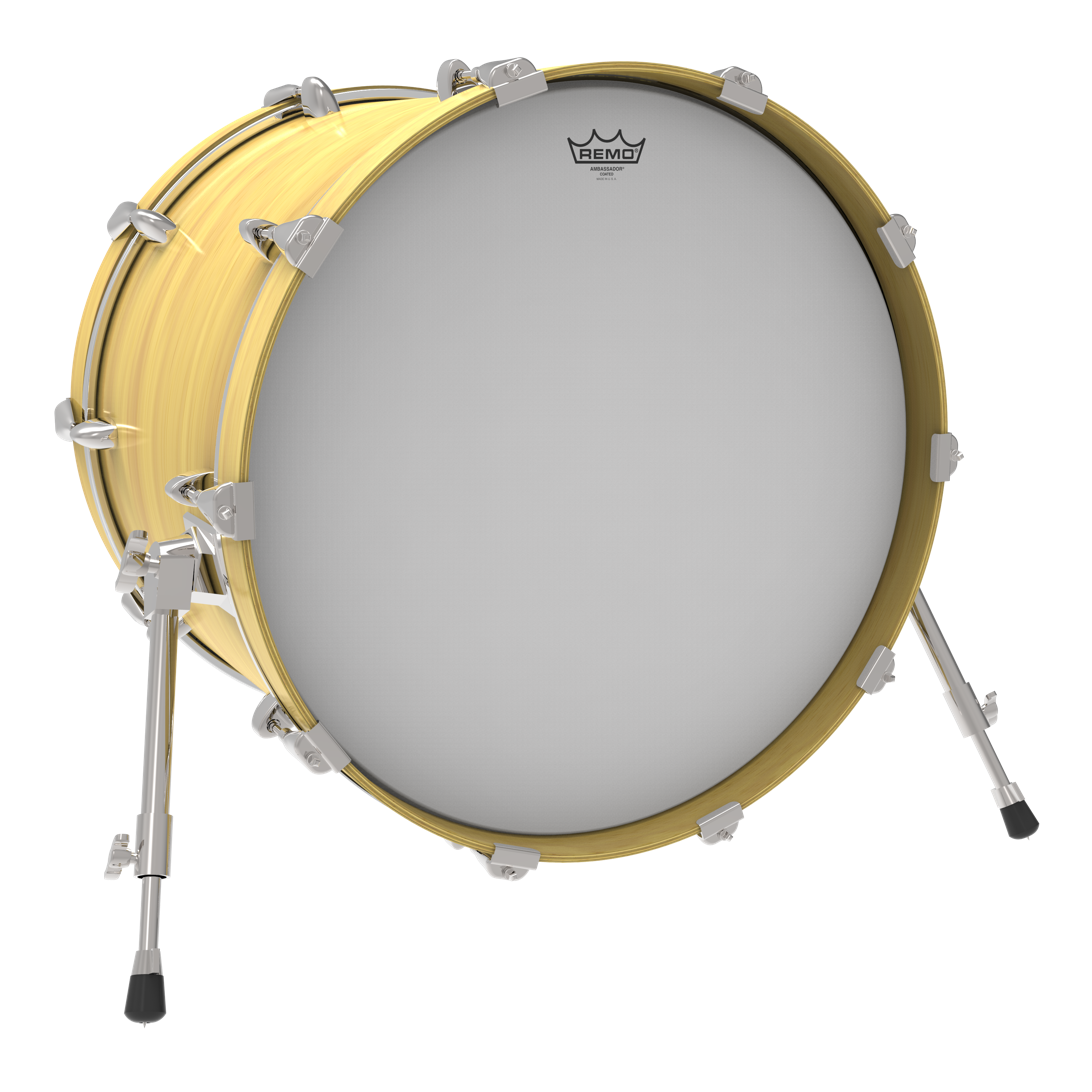
Remo Ambassador Coated drumhead on Bass Drum

- Ambassador / Vintage A / Ambassador X – A single-ply drumhead made from 10 mil of Mylar film. These heads are most commonly used as snare batter heads. Vintage A heads consist of two plies (7.5 and 3 mil) of polyester film, while Ambassador X heads are 20% thicker than their original counterparts. Vintage As and Ambassador X heads are available as coated heads only. In general, Ambassadors can be used as either batter or resonant heads and players have a choice as which way they wish to use them.
- Ambassador Hazy – A single-ply drumhead made from 3 mil Mylar film for snare bottom heads
- Diplomat – A single-ply drumhead made from 7.5 mil of Mylar film. Diplomats are commonly used as resonant heads for toms.
- Diplomat Hazy — A single-ply drumhead made from 2 mil Mylar film, for snare bottom heads
- Controlled Sound / Controlled Sound X – Drumheads made with 10 mil of Mylar film with a 5 mil center dot to add durability and focus. Often used as a snare batter head. For 2011, Controlled Sound X heads are increased-durability versions of the original, made with a 12 mil coated ply of Mylar film, and are only available as snare sizes.
- Emperor / Emperor X / Vintage Emperor – Drumheads made with two free-floating plies (7 mil) of Mylar film, making them the brightest-sounding two-ply heads and the most durable clear heads of the Weatherking series. Emperor X heads are made with two 10 mil plies of Mylar with a 5 mil reverse dot, making these Remo's most durable drumheads among rock and metal drummers. Vintage Emperor heads are made with two plies (7.5 mil) of polyester film. Emperor X heads come in snare sizes only, while Vintage Emperors are also available as clear heads.
- Smooth White – Drumheads with the characteristics of clear and coated heads, making these an ideal choice for marching drumheads. Available in Ambassador, Controlled Sound, Emperor, Diplomat, Powerstroke 3 and Powerstroke 4 weights.
- Ebony – Black drumheads that provide a darker sound, making them a popular choice for resonant heads. These are available in Ambassador, Pinstripe, Powerstroke 3, and Suede weights.
- Pinstripe – Drumheads made with two plies (7 mil plies) of Mylar film with a measured layer of a ring-reducing agent applied between them at the outer edge, that gives a "fat" low pitch and a short sustain, making them popular among rock and R&B drummers.
- Suede / Black Suede – Textured drumheads that enhance the production and reflection of sound. Black Suede drumheads have a slightly darker tone than their Suede counterparts. These drumheads come in Ambassador, Emperor, Black X (two 10 mil plies of Mylar with a 3 mil reverse dot), Diplomat (Suede), and snare side weights.
- Powerstroke 3 / Powerstroke 4 – Ambassador-weight drumheads with a thin underlay at the edge of the head to dampen overtones, making these a popular choice for bass and snare drums. Powerstroke 4s are two-ply versions of the Powerstroke 3 with a much darker sound than their single-ply counterparts.
- Powersonic – Bass drumheads made with two 7 mil plies of Mylar film with internal dampening rings to enhance low-end frequencies. These heads come with a snap-on ESDS (External Sound Dampening System) system for added muffling.
- Powerstroke X – Drumheads made with a single ply (14 mil) of Mylar film with a 2 mil inlay ring and optional reverse dot. Snare sizes only.
- Powerstroke Pro – New for 2011, the Powerstroke Pro series of bass drumheads consists of a single ply of Mylar film (10 mil). Powerstroke Pro heads feature permanently mounted acoustic foam and come with Remo's "Pressure Dampening Profile" to reduce overtones and improve sound quality. They are available in clear, coated, and Ebony.

== Rose Parade ==
Remo sponsors the Rose Parade's annual Bandfest shows, which are held annually at the end of December to showcase the bands participating in the New Year's Day parade in Pasadena, California. Bandfest is held at Pasadena City College's Mack and Jackie Robinson Stadium, which is named for its alumni Mack and Jackie Robinson.
