= Nauheim =

- Municipality
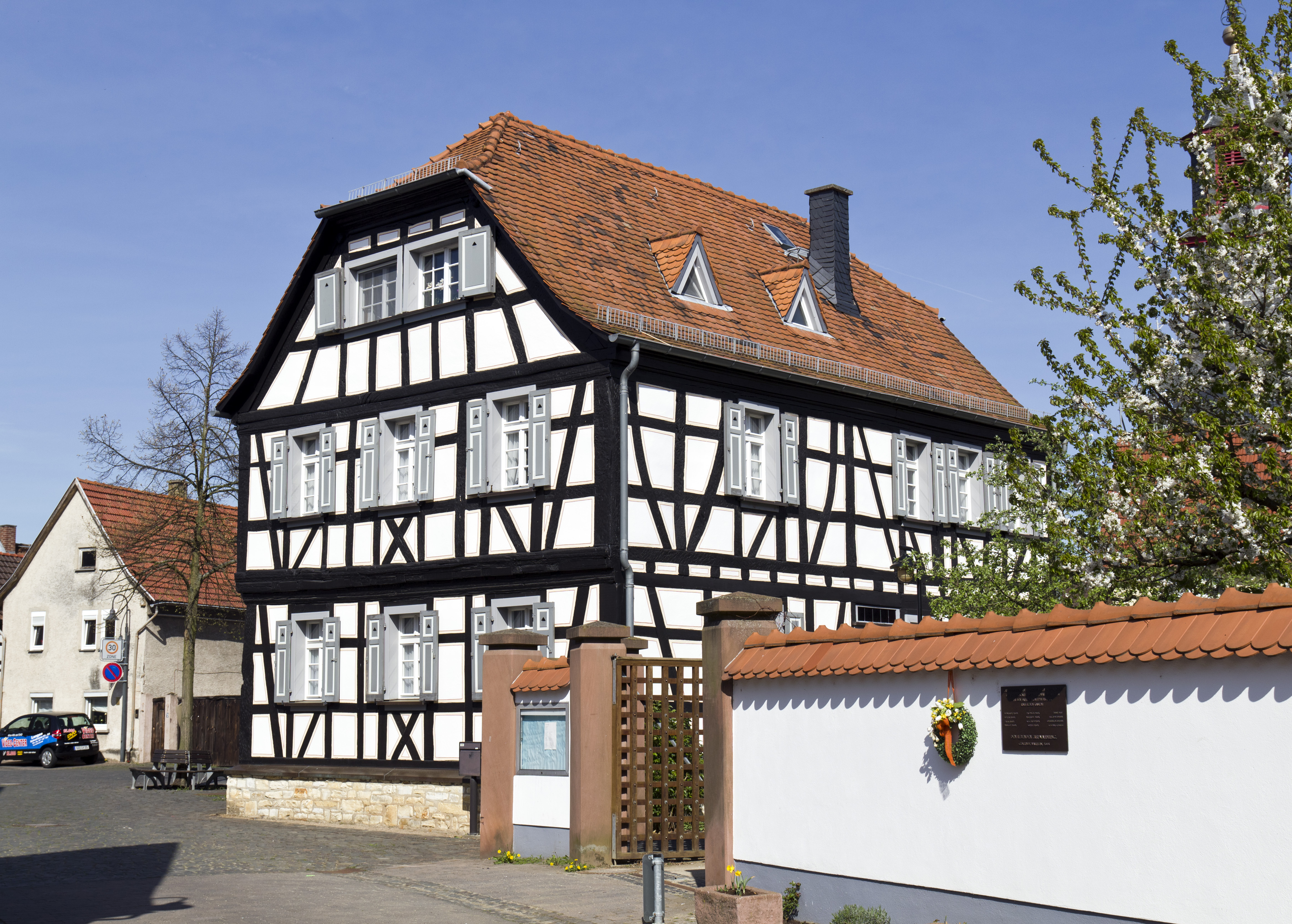
- Old Town Hall

- Coat of arms

- Location of Nauheim within Groß-Gerau district
- Interactive map of Nauheim
- Location within Germany Location within Hesse
- Coordinates: 49°57′02″N 08°27′47″E
- Country: Germany
- State: Hesse
- Admin. region: Darmstadt
- District: Groß-Gerau

Government
  - Mayor (2023–29): Roland Kappes (Ind.)

Area
  - Total: 13.77 km^{2} (5.32 sq mi)
- Elevation: 86 m (282 ft)

Population (2025-12-31)
  - Total: 10,490
  - Density: 761.8/km^{2} (1,973/sq mi)
- Time zone: UTC+01:00 (CET)
  - Summer (DST): UTC+02:00 (CEST)
- Postal codes: 64569
- Dialling codes: 06152
- Vehicle registration: GG
- Website: www.nauheim.de

Nauheim is a municipality in Groß-Gerau district in Hesse, Germany. It is located southwest of Frankfurt am Main and is part of the metropolitan region of Frankfurt. It lies in the Hessian Ried.

== Geography ==
=== Location ===
Nauheim lies 3 km northwest of the district seat of Groß-Gerau 16 km northwest of Darmstadt and 6 km southeast of Rüsselsheim. After the Second World War, many instrument makers from the Sudetenland such as W. Schreiber + Söhne found a new home in this community in the southern Frankfurt Rhein-Main Region, and helped give the place the epithet Musikgemeinde – "Music Community". It is also well known for its "Nauheimer Musiktage" ("Nauheim Music Days"), held since 1970.

=== Neighbouring communities ===
Nauheim borders in the north on Königstädten, a constituent community of the town of Rüsselsheim, in the east on the town of Mörfelden-Walldorf, in the south on the town of Groß-Gerau and in the west on the community of Trebur.

== History ==
Nauheim had its first documentary mention in 830–850 in the Lorsch codex.

== Manufacture of saxophones ==
Schreiber & Keilwerth Musikinstrumente GmbH, a firm manufacturing saxophones are based in Nauheim as of 2010.

Additionally, another saxophone manufacturer called Dörfler & Jörka was located in Nauheim between 1949 and 1968. D&J had a close and complicated relationship with Keilwerth. D&J were originally employed as subcontractors for Keilwerth, making saxophone bodies and other component parts, then sending them back to the nearby Keilwerth factory for final assembly. Eventually, D&J started to manufacture their own complete saxophones (without any Keilwerth involvement) before supplying them directly to German musical instrument retailers as well as the export market. Saxophones manufactured by Dörfler & Jörka for distribution direct to retailers featured their own key mechanisms which were very closely modelled on Keilwerth designs, though not completely identical. D&J saxophones are not Keilwerth "stencils", but nearly identical copies of Keilwerths from the same era (for example, they have rolled tone holes). As a result, the tonal characteristics of Dörfler & Jörka saxophones are very similar to Keilwerth instruments and share the distinctive Keilwerth sound i.e. have the same "dark", "smoky", "punchy" and "woody" Keilwerth tone colours, compared to the "brighter" and more neutral sound of, say, Yamaha saxophones. Not surprisingly, it can be very difficult to distinguish the sound of D&J instruments from Keilwerth-manufactured saxophones dating from the same time period e.g. the Keilwerth 'New King' and 'Tone King' models.

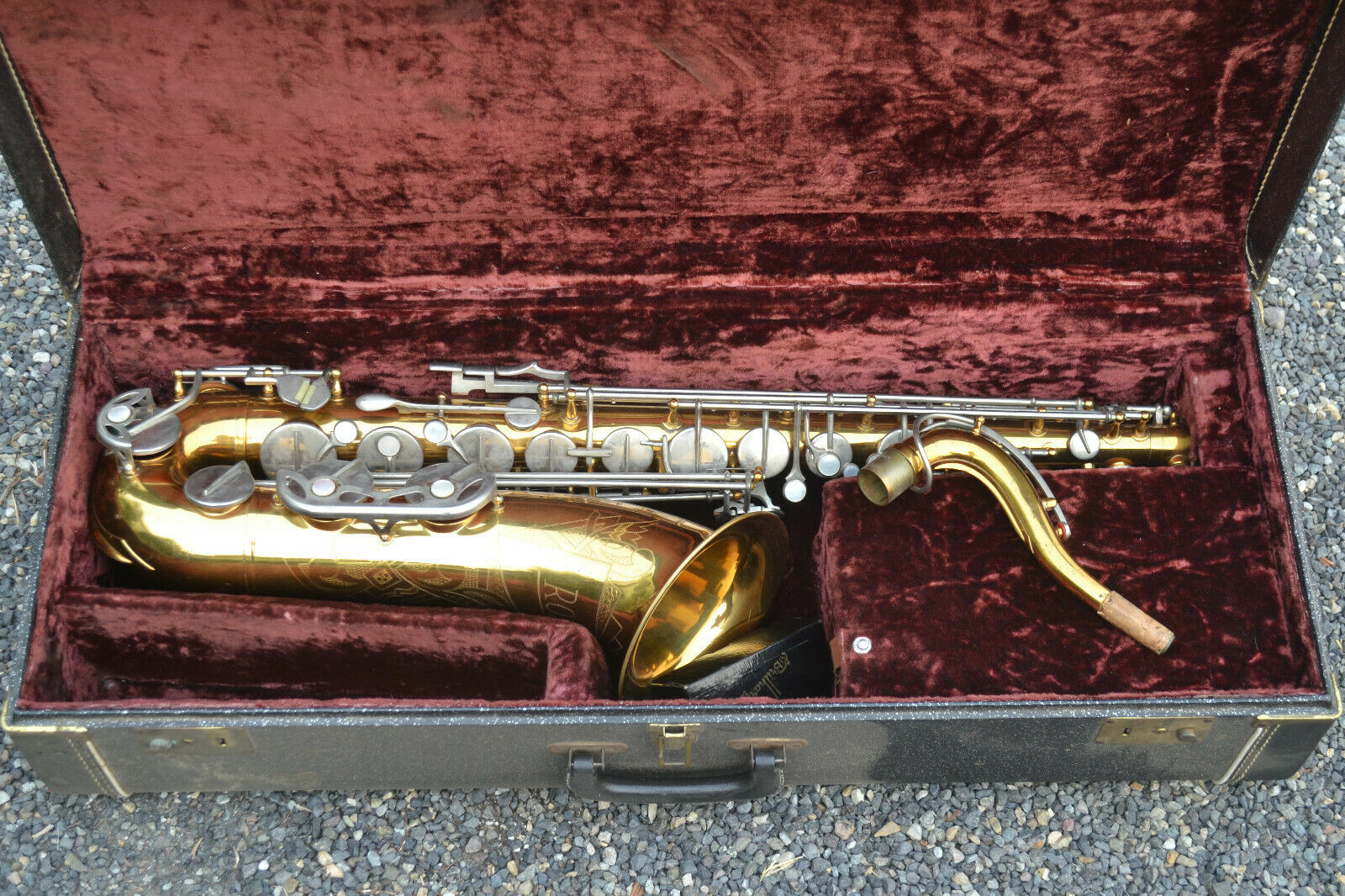
Dörfler & Jörka tenor saxophone (engraved as 'Roxy') in its original case, dating from circa 1960s

D&J manufactured alto and tenor saxophones exclusively. There is no evidence of soprano or baritone saxophones ever being produced by them. Unusually for a saxophone manufacturer, Dörfler & Jörka rarely had their own name engraved on their instruments. The majority of D&J saxophones were engraved with numerous different labels including (but not limited to) the following:-

- Ace, Artist #300
- Boucet
- Cadet, Carl Ludwig, Carl Schiller, Clinton, Condor, Convair
- De Villiers, De Villier, Diamond, Diplomat
- Gebr. Alexander Mainz
- Henri Bouchet, H.Genet
- Impala
- Jubilee, John Burg Zürich
- Key Tone, King Tempo, Kaiser
- La Sete Professional
- Marcel-Doriot
- National
- Original Hopf Classic
- Paragon, Pierre Maure Artiste
- Ravoy, Rene Dumont, Rodgers, Roxy
- Senator, Startone, Skymaster, Skytone, Symphonic
- The National, Toneline Artist
- US Bandmaster
- Velvetone, Vitacoustic, Voss
- Warner Concerto

The design and location of the neck screw (which is completely different from the type used by Keilwerth) is a simple but accurate method of identifying Dörfler & Jörka instruments. D&J used a distinctive, large thumb screw located on the front of the receiver to tighten the neck, whereas Keilwerth used a traditional side-mounted screw.

Due to issues of intellectual property infringement, brand recognition and consequential loss of revenue, the Keilwerth company became increasingly aggrieved that Dörfler & Jörka were successfully copying their saxophones, which was amplified by the fact that both companies were based in the same town and had previously enjoyed a mutually beneficial business relationship. Around 1965 the Keilwerth company sued D&J and won their case. Dörfler & Jörka were subsequently absorbed into the Keilwerth company and production of all D&J saxophones ended by 1968.

== Politics ==
Municipal council is made up of 31 councillors, with seats apportioned thus, in accordance with municipal elections held on 6 March 2016:

- CDU 9 seats
- SPD 10 seats
- Greens 5 seats
- FDP 3 seats
- FLN 4 seats

Note: FLN is a citizens' coalition.

== Twin towns – sister cities ==
- Born (Sittard-Geleen), Netherlands, since 1972
- Charvieu-Chavagneux, France, since 1978

== Culture and sightseeing ==
The local history museum (Heimatmuseum) shows farming traditions, handicraft history, an Ore Mountains Parlour and a musical instrument department with nearly 200 instruments from various periods.

== Notable people ==
- Ottmar Hörl (born 1950), artist
- Melissa Diete (born 2012), rhythmic gymnast

== Clubs and associations ==
- Free religious Community of Nauheim
- Nauheim volunteer fire brigade
- Nauheim youth fire brigade
- Musikverein 1950 e.V. Nauheim
- Naumer Kerweborsch Nauheim church fair organizers
- Vereinsring Nauheim
- Junge Musiker - SKV Nauheim
