= Remo Belli =

American jazz drummer (1927–2016)

- Born: Remo Delmo Belli; June 22, 1927; Mishawaka, Indiana, U.S.
- Died: April 25, 2016 (aged 88) Pasadena, California, U.S.
- Genres: Jazz
- Occupations: Musician, entrepreneur
- Instrument: Drums

Remo Delmo Belli (June 22, 1927 – April 25, 2016) was an American jazz drummer who developed and marketed the first successful synthetic drumheads and founded the Remo company.

== Biography ==
Belli was born in Mishawaka, Indiana, and began drumming at the age of 12. At age 16, he started work as a professional musician before serving in the U.S. Navy, where he also played in a band. After his discharge he moved to California, where he performed in clubs and toured with Anita O'Day and Billy May. After opening a store, Drum City, on Santa Monica Boulevard in 1950, he realized after a few years that the growth of rock and roll meant that there were insufficient supplies of calfskin, the traditional material for drumheads, to meet the demands. He bought a supply of Mylar, a durable polyester film, and after testing its qualities by stapling it to a drum hoop, established a partnership with chemist Samuel Muchnick who developed a way of bonding the plastic membrane to an aluminum hoop.

After founding the company Remo Inc., he started marketing the new synthetic drumheads in 1957, with endorsements from leading drummers such as Buddy Rich and Gene Krupa. The new drumheads, marketed as Remo Weather King, eventually became a huge commercial success. Belli later said that the invention "changed everything in the whole musical instruments category; it was no longer woodwinds and brass winds and strings. It became guitars and amplification and drums." His company grew to accommodate a large factory in Valencia, California, where he lived. He also developed a range of other percussion instruments, and became an advocate for the use of drumming as therapy.

Belli died of pneumonia in Pasadena, California, aged 88.
