= North Drums =

Horn-shaped type of drums

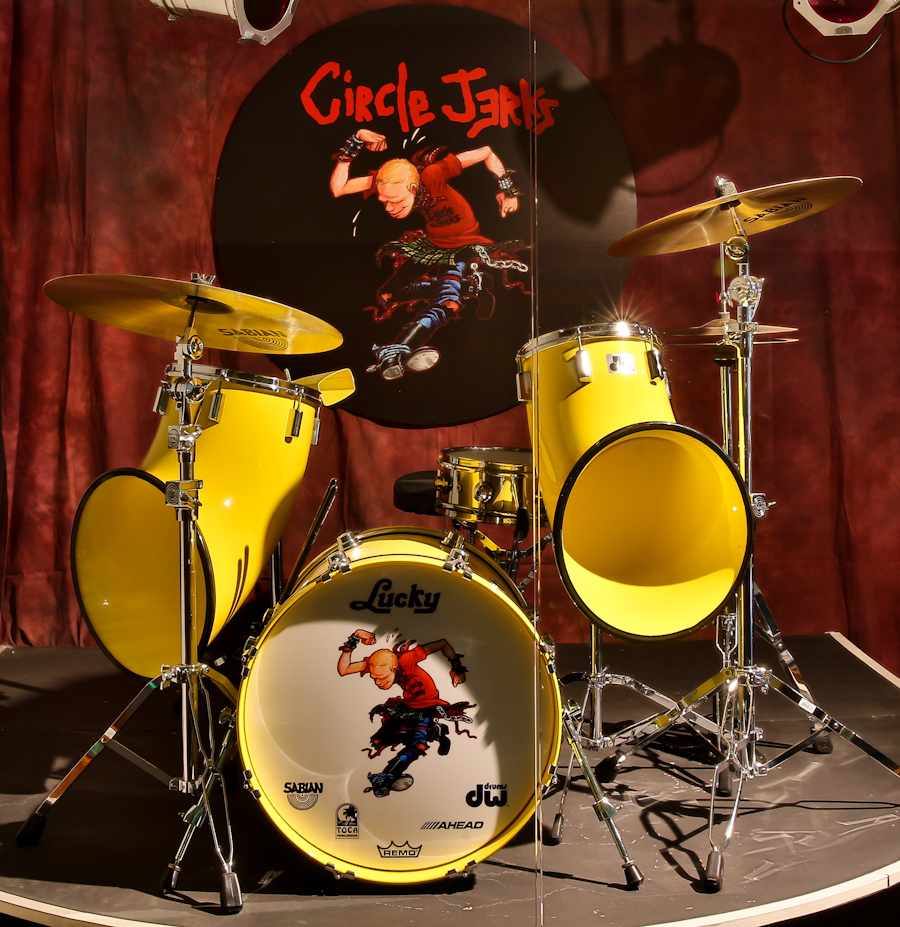

North Drums are horn-shaped drums that were designed to project their sound outward, so the audience can hear the most direct qualities of the drum. They were used by a number of notable drummers during the 1970s and continued to have limited popularity into the 1990s, well after the drums stopped being commercially sold.

== History ==
North Drums were invented by then Boston resident and drummer Roger North, while he was a member of band Quill. He was later the longtime drummer of the Holy Modal Rounders and the Clamtones. North created the fiberglass-shelled drums by hand for his own usage in late 1968, and was granted a U.S. patent, #3603194 on the design in 1971.

Starting in 1973, he began producing the original commercial configuration of the drums and began selling them both directly and through retail dealers to various top musicians and drummers as well as to the general public through retail dealers. In 1976, North licensed the patent rights to Music Technology Incorporated (MTI) to manufacture and market the drums in hopes of higher production and distribution volume. Under MTI management, the drum shells were produced first by a fiberglass manufacturer in Long Island, then for a time again by Roger North in his facility in Troutdale, Oregon, and eventually in Italy using an injection-molded polystyrene process.

The drums stopped being commercially sold in the early 1980s but a used market for the drums soon developed. A small though loyal contingent of North Drum players thus continued.

== Notable uses of the North Drums ==
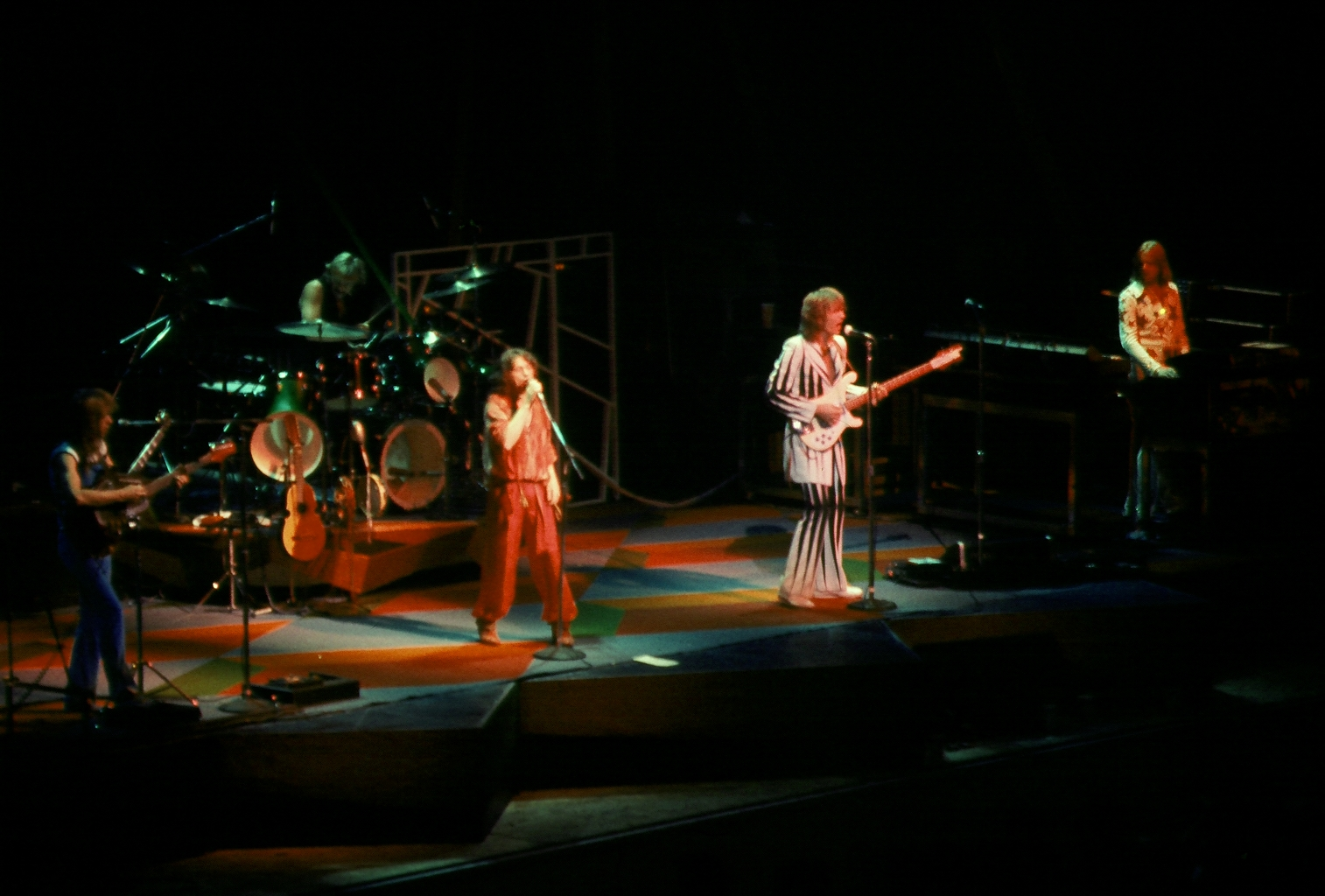
Alan White with North Drums, Yes concert, Indianapolis, 1977

Billy Cobham, Doug Clifford of Creedence Clearwater Revival, Alan White of Yes, Joe English of Wings, Gerry Brown, Russ Kunkel, W.S. "Fluke" Holland (Johnny Cash), and Richie Albright (Waylon Jennings) all used North Drums at some point.

The Concord Blue Devils Drum and Bugle Corps used North Triple drums in 1976. Lucky Lehrer of the Circle Jerks used North tom-toms. The drum set was destroyed by fans slam dancing, but was refurbished by DW’s Louie Garcia, and is on permanent display behind glass at the Hard Rock Hotel & Casino in Las Vegas.

The Long Island Sunrisers Drum and Bugle corps used North Triple drums in 1981. Although primarily a Ludwig endorser, Alex Van Halen incorporated a set of North Drum toms in his enormous white touring kit for Van Halen's OU812 album in 1988. Chad Channing was known for using North Drums in the early years of Nirvana. Drummer Ted VanTilburg formerly of Morgue played North Drums from 1988 to 1993. Hana of the Japanese band Gacharic Spin also uses North drums.

== See also ==
- List of drum makers
