= Mapex Drums =

Drum Brand

Mapex
- Product type: Musical instruments
- Current owner: KHS
- Country: Taiwan
- Introduced: 1989; 37 years ago in Taipei, Taiwan
- Markets: Worldwide
- Tagline: Play More
- Website: mapexdrums.com

Mapex Drums (an acronym for Music And Percussion EXcellence) is a Taiwanese manufacturer of drum kits, snare drums, marching percussion, and drum hardware. Founded in 1989 by KHS Musical Instruments in Taipei, Taiwan, Mapex operates as a proprietary brand evolved from KHS's history of OEM percussion manufacturing.

Mapex produces a wide spectrum of percussion equipment ranging from beginner and student drum sets to professional-tier instruments. The brand's flagship product lines include the Black Panther Design Lab Series, the Design Lab Hardware series, and the **Quantum** series of marching snares, tenor quads, and bass drums used by marching bands and Drum Corps International (DCI) ensembles.

Through its "Design Lab" product development concept, Mapex utilizes a "Concept Hybrid Formula" to combine custom shell formulations into its instrument making and sonic design.

== History ==
=== Foundation and Early Years (1989–1999) ===
Mapex Drums was launched in 1989 by KHS Musical Instruments in Taipei, Taiwan, shifting the company's focus from original equipment manufacturing (OEM) for other percussion brands to creating its own proprietary drum line. In 1991, jazz drummer Ralph Peterson Jr. became the brand's first major endorser.

In 1992, Mapex introduced its first high-end drum lines, the Orion Custom Maple and Orion Studio Birch series. The following year, Mapex released the Mars Pro series, utilizing automated manufacturing techniques to introduce lacquer finishes to mid-range drum sets. In 1996, the brand established its U.S. headquarters in La Vergne, Tennessee. Mapex launched the Black Panther snare drum line in 1997 and introduced the Isolated Tom System (ITS) mounting technology on Orion and Saturn series drums.

=== Expansion and Hardware Innovation (2000–2013) ===
During the 2000s, Mapex expanded manufacturing operations to Tianjin, China, and increased distribution to over 40 countries. In 2000, Mapex released the Janus Transmission Hat double pedal, which received a Musikmesse International Press Award (MIPA). To support product design, Mapex established a dedicated drum research and development center in 2001 to conduct acoustic frequency testing and material analysis.

The company introduced its Quantum Series marching percussion line in 2009, featuring hybrid shell construction for high school, university, and competitive Drum Corps International (DCI) drum corps. In 2010, Mapex debuted the Falcon hardware line and expanded the Black Panther series with specialized metallic and steel artistic finishes. The Saturn IV series drum kit was introduced in 2013, winning several industry awards at the NAMM Show.

=== SONIClear™ Edge and Design Lab (2014–present) ===
In 2014, Mapex introduced its proprietary SONIClear™ bearing edge design, engineered to allow drumheads to sit flatter against the shell to broaden tuning range and improve fundamental pitch resonance.

In 2017, Mapex released the "Black Panther Design Lab", the flagship series of the brand. To commemorate the brand's 30th anniversary in 2020, the brand launched the Saturn Evolution series alongside limited-edition Modern Classic drum kits and snares.

== Artists ==
Mapex has maintained endorsement relationships with numerous prominent drummers across genres such as rock, metal, jazz, and pop. Many endorsers have also collaborated with the company on signature gear, particularly within the Black Panther Design Lab Artist or Artist Collection snare drum line.

Notable current Mapex artists include:

- Craig Blundell (Steven Wilson)
- Chris Adler (ex Lamb of God)
- Aquiles Priester (W.A.S.P., Angra)
- Rashid Williams (John Legend)
- Claus Hessler (Educator)
- Jeff Hamilton (Jazz artist)
- Alain Ackermann (Eluveitie)
- Alex Landenburg (Kamelot)
- Felix Bohnke (Avantasia)
- Josh Devine (Levara)

=== Signature Collaborations ===
Several artists have partnered with Mapex to design signature snare drums including models like Aquiles Priester ("PsychOctopus")，Chris Adler ("Warbird") and Jeff Hamilton ("Maximus").

== Drums ==
=== Black Panther Design Lab ===
First introduced in 2017, the Black Panther Design Lab series serves as Mapex's flagship line of professional drum kits. The line was reissued in 2024, replacing the previous MAATS (Magnetic Air Adjustment Tom Suspension) mount with Mapex's HALO Mounting System, alongside an updated badge.

Models available in the series include:

- Versatus: Features a hybrid maple and mahogany shell designed for all-around musical versatility.
- Cherry Bomb: Constructed entirely from cherry wood plies, designed to produce a focused vintage acoustic profile with modern projection，two configurations choice provided.
- Equinox: Newly introduced in 2024, utilizing a padauk and maple hybrid shell paired with single-flanged hoops to emphasize brightness and articulation.

The Black Panther Design Lab series equipped Mapex's top features, including the HALO mounting system with sustain adjustment, SAS (Sound Attenuation System) floor tom legs, Master Tune lugs, and SONIClear bearing edges.

=== Saturn Evolution ===
Introduced in 2020 as an extension of Saturn series. Building upon the brand's signature hybrid shell construction, the series offers two primary shell configurations: a traditional Maple/Walnut hybrid shell for a warm, resonant tone, and a Birch/Walnut hybrid shell for increased high-end articulation and punch. The series also offers a 'Hybrid Set' configuration combining birch/walnut toms with a maple/walnut bass drum.

=== Saturn VI ===
Introduced in late 2025 as the latest iteration of Mapex's longest-running drum series. The drums feature 6-ply hybrid shells on toms and floor toms paired with an 8-ply bass drum, finished in high-gloss lacquered exotic veneers.

=== Armory ===
The Armory series is Mapex's mid-to-high intermediate line of drum kits. The drums feature 6-ply (or 8-ply) birch/maple hybrid shells designed to combine birch's attack and projection with maple's warmth and resonance.

=== Mars Maple ===
Launched in 2022, The Mars Maple series is Mapex's intermediate line focused on 100% European maple construction.

=== Mars Birch ===
Launched alongside Mars Maple in 2022, The Mars Birch series is Mapex's entry-to-intermediate line built from 100% 6-ply birch shells.

=== Venus ===
Re-introduced in 2022 after a 20-year hiatus, the Venus series serves as Mapex's entry-level, all-inclusive drum kit line designed for beginner and student drummers. Built with 9-ply poplar shells, the series provides a full setup package that includes the complete drum shell pack, 400 Series hardware, cymbals, drumsticks, and a drum throne.

=== Comet ===
Introduced in 2024 as Mapex's entry-level starter drum kit line, the Comet series is designed for beginner drummers. Building on the all-inclusive model, the Comet replaces previous entry-level lines (such as the Tornado and Prodigy) and features 9-ply poplar shells equipped with Mapex's SONIClear bearing edges to simplify tuning for beginners. The series provides a full setup package that includes the complete drum shell pack, 250 Series hardware, cymbals, drumsticks, and a drum throne.

=== Discontiuned Series ===
==== Mapex M and Meridian Birch ====
As of early 2009, Mapex has replaced the very popular M Birch and Pro-M drums series, with the Meridian Birch and Meridian Maple series respectively. These are considered to be intermediate/semi-pro lines of drums. The Meridian Maple series feature 7-ply, 5.8mm, all maple shells (7.2mm bass drum). They also feature Mapex 2.3mm Steel Powerhoops and Remo UT Pinstripe batter heads along with Spring Loaded Floor Tom Legs (from the higher end Saturn & Orion lines). The Meridian Birch features 6-ply, 7.2mm, all birch shells, and also feature Remo UT heads, but not the 2.3mm Powerhoops nor the Spring Cushioned Floor Tom Legs. The hoops on the Birch line (1.6mm) and the floor tom legs are considerably thinner. It is a common misconception among customers (even among some Mapex retailers) that these two lines of drums are similar and share the same features. The Maple line has several higher end features taken from the previous Pro-M line and the Birch line carries forward the M-Birch features. In 2004 the M series and Pro M series Mapex drums were both constructed with maple shells. In 2005 the M series Mapex drum changed to Birch shells, the Pro M continued to carry foreword the North American maple shells, both these shell distinctions remained through 2008. In 2009 the two lines were renamed Meridian Maple and Meridian birch to clear up the long held confusion that M indicated Maple, as the initial M series was made with Maple shells. The Meridian series are Mapex's most popular series of drums.

==== MyDentity ====
Following the popularity of the Meridian line, Mapex launched –only for the USA market as of 2013– the "MyDentity" line of custom ordered intermediate/semi-pro drums. This level of customization is usually only found in high-end drum lines.

==== Saturn ====
Mapex Saturn
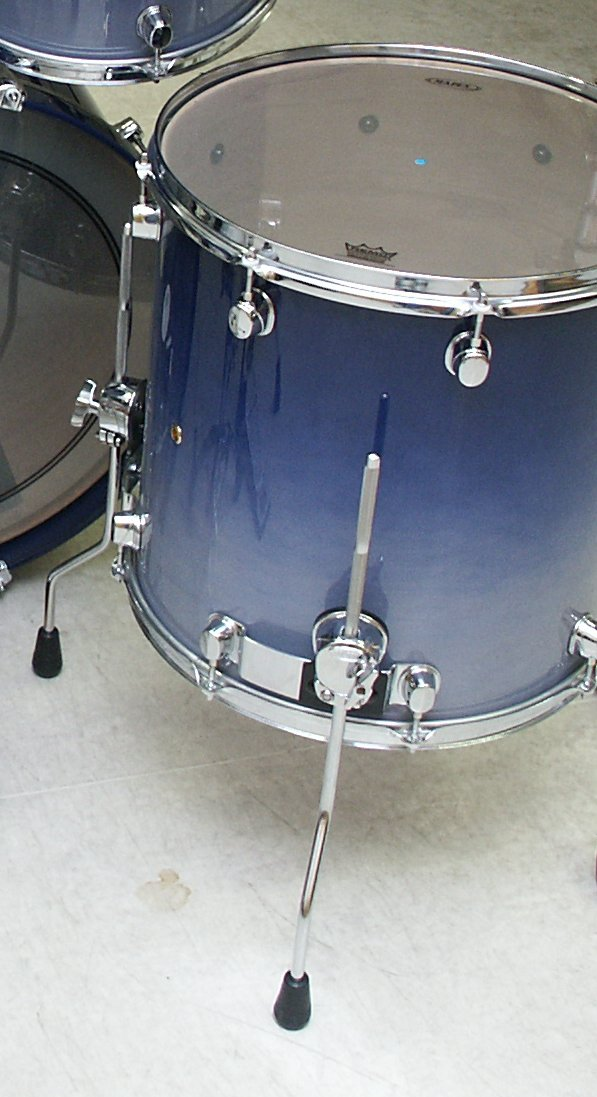
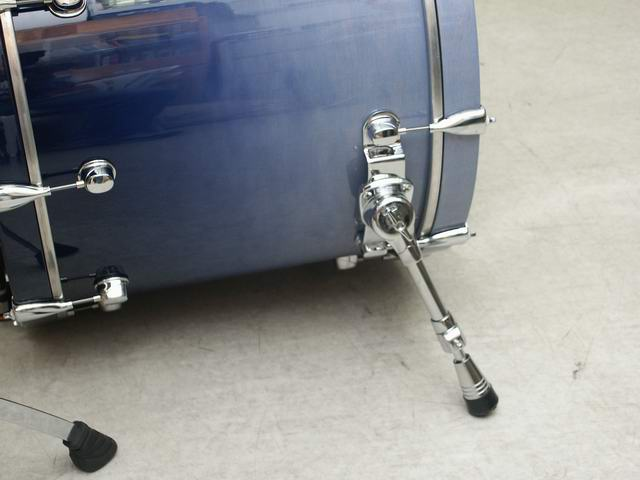
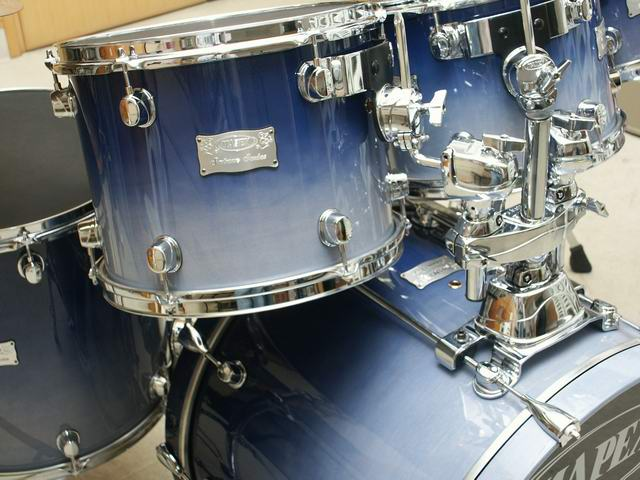
Fltr: 1: Floating floor tom legs; 2: Non-penetrating bass drum spur; 3: I.T.S. isolated tom mount system

The Saturn line is constructed of maple and walnut (the oldest lines were made of basswood or mahogany instead of walnut). The kit is constructed of 6 plies of wood for a shell thickness of 5.1 millimeters. It shares a number of options with both the Mars and Orion line, but is not available with birdseye maple plies. Saturn kits come in a variety of lacquer and wrap finishes (including bursts, sparkles and fades) and come with the option of black or chrome hardware. The Saturn has become very popular, as the thinner hybrid shells provide a lower/warmer/darker fundamental tone than similar all-maple shells. Although they are priced as midrange drums, they are considered a fully professional kit and used by recording artists such as Chris Adler from Lamb of God, who recently switched over to the new Black Panther line of drums. During 2011 and 2012 Mapex also offered the Saturn LE (Limited Edition) and Saturn SE (Special Edition) Birch/Walnut kits. Mapex built 100 Limited Edition kits only, and a limited number of the SE kits as well. According to the Mapex site as of March 2013, the Special Edition Saturn Birch/Walnut was an extension and addition to the distinctive Saturn sound. Mapex had taken the rich sonic characteristics of walnut and combined them with the bright and articulate punch of birch. The result is a drum shell that projects a fusion of depth and clarity. The five-piece shell pack was available in Ocean Wave Fade, Moss Green, Wine Burst, or Walnut Fade over Figured Maple and is appointed with smoky black hardware. The relative rarity of the LE and SE kits is increasing their value and they are considered by some to be the finest Saturn kits ever made.

Mapex has since released the Saturn IV line in 2014 and the Saturn V line in 2015. Along with several new shell finishes, these new lines of Saturn feature a new tom mount isolation system called Soniclear The primary change from Saturn IV to Saturn V is the addition of Mapex's Soniclear Bearing Edge, introduced previously on lower lines, including MyDentity, Armory and Mars Kits. This new edge allows the drumhead to sit flatter and brings out an improved response by optimizing the relationship between head and shell.

==== Orion ====
The Orion Series is an all-maple 6.1 millimetre 7-ply setup with an outer layer of Birdseye maple as an option. It is Mapex's flagship series and is also the most versatile kit available from Mapex as each kit can only be ordered by components. No preconfigured kits are available. It is available with Chrome, Black Nickel and 24-kt. gold-plated hardware.

For the duration of 2005 the Orion's inner "plies" were identical to the all-maple Pro-M's inner plies, the difference being the outer "finish" ply. The Orion received Mapex's figured birdseye maple or other such exotic wood finishes, while the Pro-M received regular North American maple finish ply. With the exception of the 15th Anniversary edition Pro-M with a production run of 300 worldwide, this set was given the figured Birdseye Maple finish of the Orion in Autumn or Jade Fade.

The overall shell thicknesses for both the Orion and the early Pro-Ms of 2005 - 2006 were identical at 6.1 mm. This was the case only till early 2006 when production changed at the factory in Tianjin. All Pro-Ms received a changed ply configuration and thickness resulting in an overall shell thickness of 5.8mm, and the Orion kept its 6.1 mm shell thickness. The Orions are actually priced lower than most of their high-end market competition. The exotic burl finish is not common with other high-end drum companies at the same price point. As of early 2012 the Orion line was discontinued. At the same time a Saturn SE (Special Edition) series of Birch/Walnut was introduced. This left the Black Panther kits as the top Mapex line available.

==== Black Panther ====
Building on the foundations of the very successful Black Panther line of snares, Mapex introduced limited editions of drumkits based on those snares. As of April 2013, four models were produced: the Blaster, the Velvetone, the Retrosonic and the Black Widow. In late 2015/early 2016, a white version of the 'Black Widow' kit called the 'White Widow' was introduced, the shell color being the only differentiating factor between the two kits.

== Snare Drums ==
Mapex produces 4 different lines of drums: Black Panther Design Lab Artist, Black Panther Design Lab, Black Panther and MPX series.

== Hardware ==
Mapex hardware lineups include Falcon 1000 Series, 800 Series, 600 Series, 400 Series and 200 Series.

== Drumheads ==
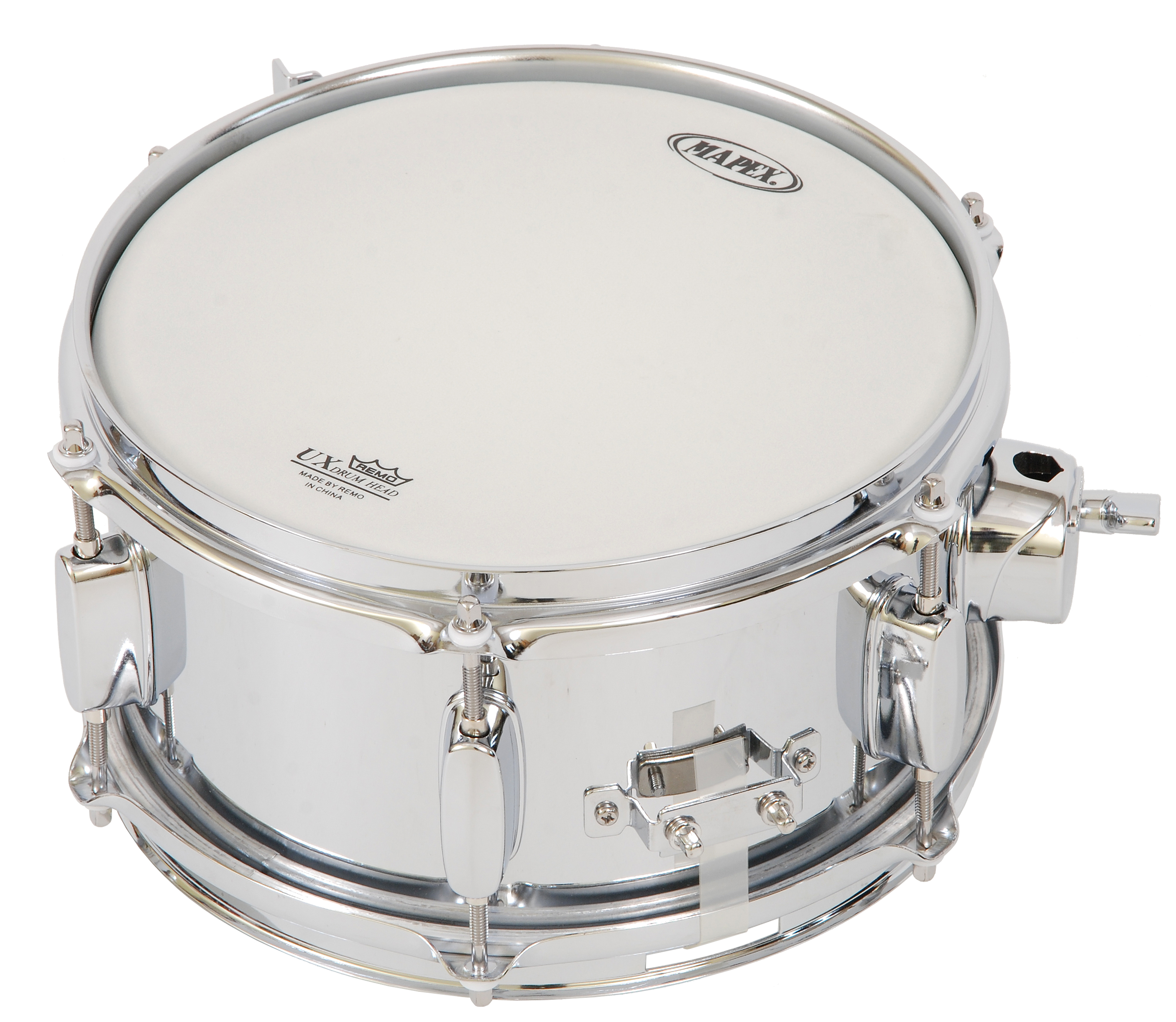
Mapex snare drum with Remo head

Mapex kits also come with Remo drumheads. All of the drums below Saturn come with the UT series, which are made in the Remo factory in China. They were made using the same Dupont Mylar film as is used on the Remo USA Weatherking head. The difference is in the construction of the head. Whereas the US heads were made using a poured channel technique, the China heads were crimped. The aluminium hoop was folded over a steel ring that is inserted in the U-channel to hold the film in place. Starting in 2007, Saturns and Orions came with Remo Emperor heads on the toms and clear Ambassadors for the resonant heads. This was put in place to showcase the full sonic capabilities of the drums right when they are in stores.

== See also ==
- KHS Musical Instruments
