= Pacific Drums and Percussion =

American drum manufacturer

Pacific Drums and Percussion (PDP)
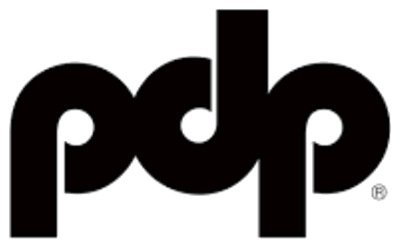
- Product type: Musical instruments
- Current owner: Drum Workshop
- Country: United States
- Introduced: 1999; 27 years ago
- Registered as a trademark in: United States
- Website: pacificdrums.com

Pacific Drums and Percussion (or PDP for short) is a musical instrument brand established by Drum Workshop Inc., in 1999, with the purpose of providing its percussion instruments at more affordable prices.

Pacific Drums products are manufactured in China, Taiwan, and Mexico. The line still uses some custom techniques, but primarily uses computerized machinery to cut costs and reduce steps to make drums in large quantities. The line of Pacific Drums instruments has drum kits, snares, hardware, pedals, and other accessories.

== Product lines ==
=== Drum kits ===
- Concept Series - is a new line of PDP drums available in both all-maple or all-birch shells. All shells are 7-ply, except for the snare which is 10-ply.
- Spectrum is PDP's intermediate shell pack which includes hybrid maple/poplar shells with matte lacquer finishes. Complete with floating tom mounts and fine threaded true pitch tension rods; shell sizes (depth x diameter): 8" x 10" and 9" x 12" toms, 14" x 16" floor tom, 18" x 22" bass drum, 5.5" x 14" snare; these kits are intended to provide a bridge between the Mainstage and Concept Series lines
- New Yorker is a line of compact drums with poplar shells. Available in a choice of two wraps
- Mainstage - PDP's latest entry level kit which includes hardware, cymbals, and drum throne
- Encore - PDP's entry level drum kit made with poplar shells normally sold as a full package with hardware and cymbals included; available in many different configurations and five colors
- Centerstage - PDP's entry level kit with poplar shells and looks exactly like the encore; the badge seems to be the only difference
- Z5 - PDP's entry level of drums that are all-wood construction, FinishPly wrap, and an array of five color choices
- PDP Player - A junior drum kit which includes a kick drum, two rack toms, a floor tom, and a snare; the kit also comes with a crash/ride cymbal, a set of hi-hats, and a child-sized throne
- X7 - As the name implies, the kits are pre-configured as a 7-piece kit. They were made from poplar (up until 2009), and came with both lacquer and wrap finishes. For 2009, the X7 kit featured all-maple shells. Pearlescent Black replaced Orange Sparkle for 2010. Purple Sparkle is also available. (Made in China)
- M5 - The M5 shell kit is all maple. Like the FS series, 8" and 16" add-on toms were available.
- FS - The drums are made from birch and come with matte lacquer finishes. These drums were pre-configured as a fusion kit with 8" and 16" toms available as add-ons.
- Platinum Series is PDP's top-of-the-line drums made from maple. These drums came in a wide range of sizes and four different types of finishes (FinishPly, Satin, Lacquer, and Exotic). For 2010, only four finishes are available. The series was discontinued in 2011.
- 805 -drums are made from birch and come in either a lacquer or wrap finishes and powder-coated hardware, with Fusion and Rock sizes available. The series was discontinued in 2009.
- LX/LXE drums are made from maple and came in a lacquer finish. LXE series drums came in exotic lacquer finishes. (Made in Ensenada, Mexico)
- MX/MXR drums are made from maple and came in satin finish. MXR series drums were available in rock sizes.
- CX/CXR drums are made from maple and came in a FinishPly wrap. CXR series drums were available in rock sizes.(the finest drums made by PDP, DW quality made in Ensenada)
- EX are entry level kits constructed from composite wood shells. Normally sold with 700 series hardware this series has been discontinued. The first series came out in 2000.
- FX/FXR drums are made from birch and come in a lacquer. FXR series drums were available in rock sizes. It was replaced by the FS series.
- EZ is a budget-priced entry-level drumset and was replaced by the Z5 series.

=== Snares ===
- Concept Series - Black Nickel over Steel (Available in sizes 6.5"x 14", 6.5"x 13", 5.5"x 14", 6"x 12", and 6"x 10")
- Specialty - LTD Classic Wood Hoop (Available in sizes 6"x 14" and 7"x 14") LTD Bubinga (Available in sizes 5.5"x 14", 6.5"x 14", 7"x 13", and 8"x 14") LTD Birch (Available in sizes 5.5"x14", 6.5"x14)
- Black Wax - Maple Snares (Available in sizes 5.5"x 14", 5.5"x 13", 6.5"x 14", 7"x 13", 6"x 12", and 6"x 10")
- Other* - Black Nickel over Brass Ace of Spades Snare (Available in sizes 5"x 14" and 6.5"x 14"
- Mainstage (Available only in 6"x 10")
- Chrome over Steel Piccolo (Available only in 13"x 3.5")
- Limited bubinga (Available in sizes 6.5"x 14", 5.5"x 14", 7"x 13", 8"x 14")
- SX Series Hammered brass
- SX Series Dual beaded brass
- Eric Hernandez "e-Panda" Signature Snare
- Chad Smith Clear Acrylic Signature Snare

=== Hardware ===
- 700 Series - PDDT720 Tractor Throne
  - PDHH700 3-Legged Hi Hat Stand (20' Min / 25" Max Height)
  - PDCB700 Straight/Boom Cymbal Stand
  - PDSS700 Snare Stand (18" Min / 25" Max Height)
  - PDCS700 Straight Cymbal Stand
  - PDDT700 Throne (20" Min / 25" Max Height)
- 800 Series - PDCB800 Straight/Boom Cymbal Stand
  - PDCS800 Straight Cymbal Stand
  - PDDT820-X Tractor Throne (21" Min / 28" Max Height)
  - PDHH800-01 3-Legged Hi Hat Stand
  - PDSS800 Snare Stand (17" Min / 21" Max Height)
  - PDHH820 2-Legged Hi Hat Stand
  - PDDT800-04 Standard Throne (21" Min/ 28" Max Height)
- Concept Series - PDHHC20 2-Legged Hi Hat Stand
  - PDHHC00 3-Legged Hi Hat Stand
  - PDSSC00 Snare Stand (16" Min / 24" Max Height)
  - PDDTC00 Throne (22" Min / 28" MAX Height)
  - PDCSC00 Straight Cymbal Stand
  - PDCBC00 Boom Cymbal Stand
  - PDTSC90 Double Tom Stand

=== Pedals ===
- 500 Series - SP500 Single Pedal and DP502 Double Pedal features:
  - Dual Chain Drive
  - Auxiliary Side Base Plate
  - Side Adjustable Toe Clamp
  - Two-Way Beater Ball
  - Offset Cam
- 400 Series - SP400 Single Pedal and DP402 Double Pedal features:
  - Two-Way Beater Ball
  - Auxiliary Side Base Plate
  - Offset Cam
  - Lefty Version of 402 Available
- Concept Series - Direct Drive Single Pedal and Double Pedal features:
  - Cobalt Low-Mass Drive Train
  - Retractable Spurs
  - Needle Bearing Hinges
  - DW Air Beater (felt/plastic)
  - XF Extended Footboard (270mm / 10.6")
  - Offset Toe Clamp
  - DW Spring Rocker Adjustment
  - Dual Base-Plate (double)

== Artists ==
Artists who use/have used PDP drums:

- Jordan Mancino (As I Lay Dying) (Note: A DW endorser, he has used the LXE series live, as seen at the 2008 Warped Tour.)
- The Rev (Avenged Sevenfold) (Note: Used an LXE series in the City of Evil album.)
- Chad Smith (Red Hot Chili Peppers)
- Eric Hernández (Bruno Mars)
- Daru Jones (Jack White)
- Johnny Rabb (Collective Soul)
- Gary "Zeus" Smith (The Fifth and Aittala) (Note: Uses PDP Concept Maple Custom live and 1st generation PDP CS series both live and rehearsal.)
- Jim Ball (Mercy Creek)
