= Majestic Percussion =

Musical instrument manufacturer

Majestic Holland B.V. (d/b/a Majestic Percussion) is a manufacturer of percussion instruments based in the Netherlands, and is a division of musical instrument manufacturer van der Glas B.V. Founded in 1921 by Willem Klazes van der Glas, Majestic claims to be the oldest timpani manufacturer in the Netherlands. Product development, engineering and production are still overseen by family members. The instruments produced by the company include timpani, bass drums, marching percussion and chimes.

The instruments are sold in the U.S. through Jupiter Band Instruments, Inc.
