= KHS Musical Instruments =

Taiwanese musical instrument manufacturer

- Industry: Musical instruments
- Founded: 1930
- Headquarters: Taiwan

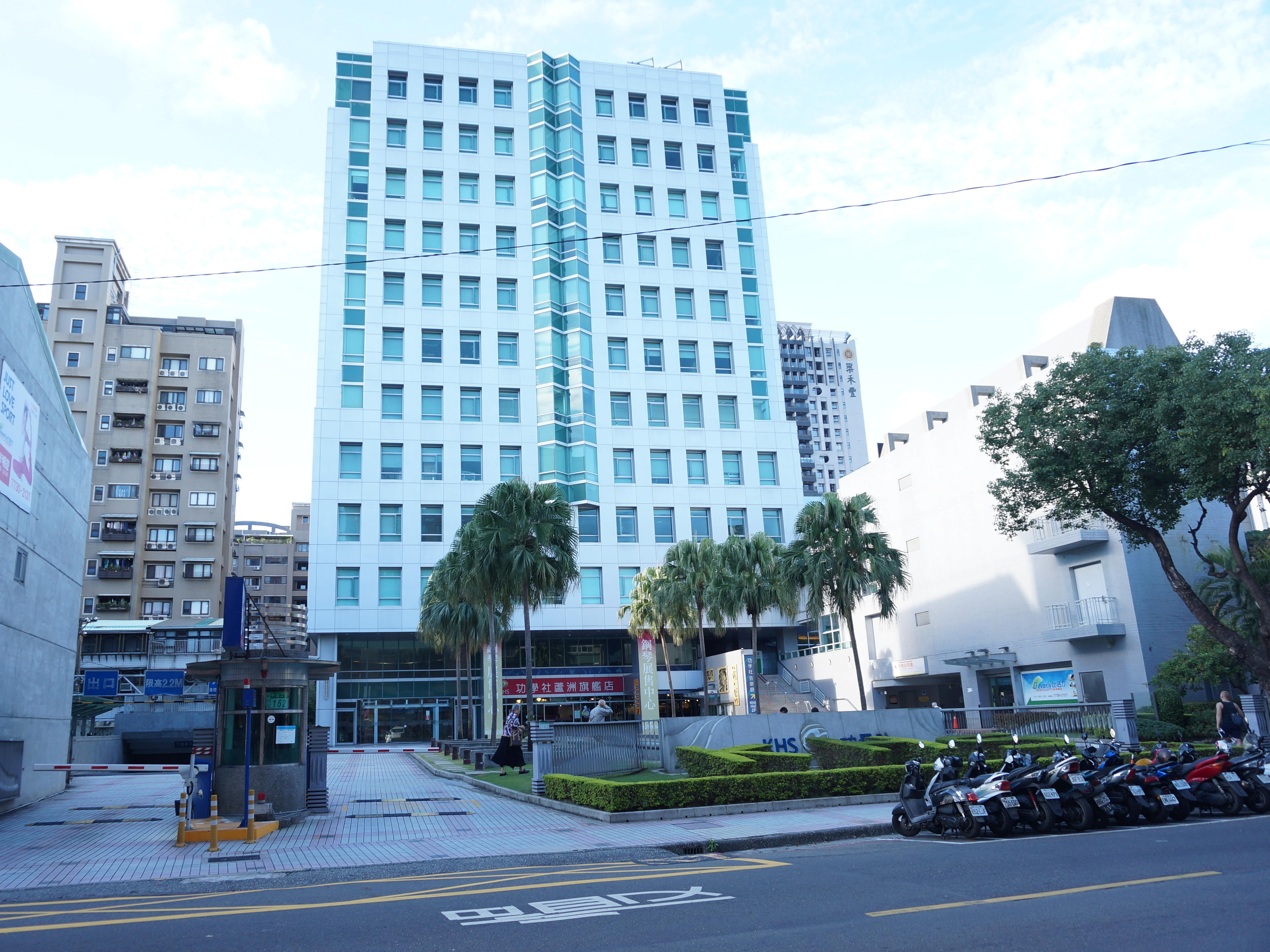
KHS Headquarters Building

KHS Musical Instruments Co., Ltd was founded in Taiwan in 1930 as an educational products company, and gained success in the 1950s as a producer of musical instruments. In 2020, KHS is a full-scale musical instrument manufacturer of a complete line of wind instruments, percussion, fretted instrument, and stand products.

== History ==
KHS was first founded with the Wan Wu (萬屋株式會社) name in Taiwan in 1930 as an educational products company and was renamed to KHS in 1945. KHS stands for Kung Hsue She (功學社) which means a company helping schools and culture. KHS started harmonica production in 1956 and started band instrument production a year later in 1957. By 1980 KHS was a full-scale musical instrument manufacturer and the Jupiter brand was started to market a complete line of wind instruments and percussion. KHS also began supplying instruments for export and sale under the American Vito brand. In 1985 KHS established the Musix company. KHS established Altus Co., Ltd. to manufacture professional flutes in 1990, and acquired Ross Mallet Instruments in 1994. Since 2010 Jupiter manufactures the ST line of saxophones for the German company Keilwerth.

== Brands ==
- Jupiter Band Instruments
- Mapex Drums
- Altus & Azumi Flutes
- Hercules Stands
- Hohner
- Majestic Percussion
- Sonor Drums
- XO Professional Brass
