= Jupiter Band Instruments =

Taiwanese musical instrument manufacturer

Jupiter Band Instruments, Inc.
- Industry: Musical instruments
- Founded: 1930; 96 years ago
- Founder: Tsu-Cheng Hsieh
- Headquarters: Taipei, Taiwan
- Area served: Worldwide
- Website: Jupiter Band Instruments

Jupiter Band Instruments, Inc. is a manufacturer and distributor of woodwind, brass and percussion instruments. Jupiter was established by its Taiwanese parent company KHS in 1980.

== History ==
KHS was first founded with the Wan Wu name in Taiwan in 1930 by Tsu-Cheng Hsieh as an educational products company and was renamed to KHS in 1945. KHS stands for Kung Hsue She which means a company helping schools and culture. KHS started harmonica production in 1956 and started band instrument production a year later in 1957. By 1980 KHS was a full-scale musical instrument manufacturer and the Jupiter Band Instruments brand was started to market a complete line of wind instruments and percussion.

In 1986, KHS transferred most of its production from its small factory in greater Taipei to a major complex in nearby Zhongli. In 1993, KHS started building a factory near Tianjin, China for the main purpose of entering the Chinese market. The KHS Chinese factory began producing instruments and instrument parts in 1996. Since then, lower-priced Jupiter instruments have been totally made in China while some mid-priced Jupiter instruments have been assembled in Taiwan from parts made at the Tianjin, China factory. Higher-priced Jupiter instruments have been totally made at the Gouling factory in Taiwan. The entire Jupiter 500 series are made in China and the Jupiter 700 series are assembled in Taiwan.

The main KHS manufacturing facility at Zhongli, Taiwan is spread over a 55-acre (220,000 m^{2}) industrial complex, featuring a 300,000-square-foot (28,000 m^{2}) band instrument and drum factory and the KHS manufacturing facility at Tianjin China, is spread over a 30-acre (120,000 m^{2}) site. Imported European components are often used and most raw materials are imported from Japan. Clarinet and saxophone mouthpieces are imported from ESM in Germany and the pearl shell used for keys is imported from Germany. Pads, springs, felt and natural cork are imported from Italy and synthetic cork is imported from France. The brass and silver plates used for the instruments bodies are imported from Japan as are the knock pins and natural cork.

The hand tools used to fashion the musical instrument parts are from Switzerland and the US and the CNC machines are from Japan. The lacquer used is imported from Britain and the US and the soldering powder is imported from Canada. All of the KHS manufacturing facilities in Taiwan and China are ISO 9001 certified. KHS has made musical instruments for other companies such as Buffet Crampon (Evette), Vito and Keilwerth ST-90 series IV saxophones, B&S trumpets and Courtois cornets. KHS has made Olds, Blessing, Riley and Arbiter Jazz saxophones.

== Brands ==
- Altus (professional flute)
- Azumi (intermediate flute)
- Jupiter (wind instruments)
- Mapex (percussion)
- Ross (mallets)
- XO (professional brass)
