= Drum Workshop =

American musical instrument company

Drum Workshop, Inc.
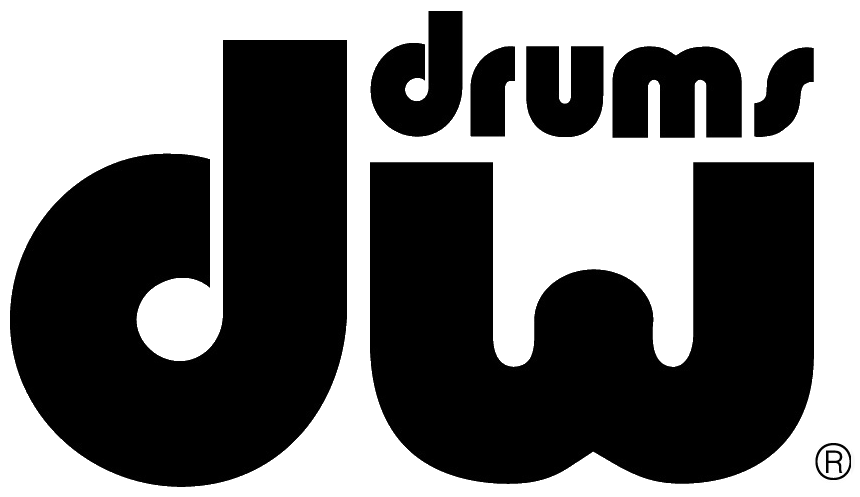
- Company type: Private
- Industry: Musical instruments
- Founded: 1972; 54 years ago in Santa Monica, California
- Headquarters: Oxnard, California, United States
- Key people: Don Lombardi, Founder; Chris Lombardi, President and CEO; John Good, COO
- Products: Drum sets; snare drums; drum hardware
- Brands: Pacific Drums
- Parent: Roland Corporation
- Subsidiaries: Slingerland Drum Company; Latin Percussion
- Website: dwdrums.com

Drum Workshop, Inc. (also known as DW Drums or DW) is a drum kit and hardware manufacturing company based in Oxnard, California. Current products by DW include drum sets, snare drums, and hardware.

== History ==
Drum Workshop was founded in 1972 as a teaching studio by Don Lombardi. Alongside student John Good, Lombardi began a small drum equipment sales operation to cover the studio's operation costs. After the closure of the Camco Drum Company in 1977, its manufacturing equipment was purchased by Drum Workshop.

After selling primarily drum hardware, the company began making its first drum sets in 1990.

== Expansion and acquisition ==
DW expanded into larger facilities in Oxnard, California, and grew to oversee a new company, Pacific Drums and Percussion, a company offering lower-priced drum sets.

In 2014–2015, Drum Workshop acquired Ovation Guitars, Latin Percussion, Toca Percussion, Gibraltar Hardware, and KAT Technologies. Gibraltar Hardware was established in 1993, focusing on drumset and percussion hardware, as well as hi-hat stands and drum set thrones. Artists who use Gibraltar hardware on their drums include Rob Bourdon (Linkin Park), Chris Adler (Lamb of God), and Luis Conte. Gibraltar hardware packs are standard for current Gretsch Drums kits.

In November, 2019, DW acquired Slingerland Drum Company from Gibson.

In late 2022, it was announced that Roland would acquire DW for $65 million as the company looks to expand into the acoustic drum market.
