= Julius Keilwerth =

German saxophone manufacturer

Schreiber & Keilwerth Musikinstrumente GmbH
- Type: Limited liability (GmbH)
- Genre: Musical instrument manufacturers
- Founded: 1925 (Julius Keilwerth)
- Headquarters: Nauheim, Germany
- Parent: Buffet Crampon
- Website: www.julius-keilwerth.com

The Julius Keilwerth company is a German saxophone manufacturer, established in 1925.

== Company history ==
=== Early history ===
Julius Keilwerth first apprenticed for the Kohlert company in Graslitz, Czechoslovakia. After this apprenticeship, Julius Keilwerth and his brother, Max, established a workshop in their home around 1925 or 1926. They primarily manufactured saxophones for Adler and F. X. Hüller. The Julius Keilwerth company became one of the largest saxophone manufacturers in Europe by the start of WWII, with approximately 150 workers. After World War II, the company relocated to its present headquarters at Nauheim, Germany.

In 1948, the old Julius Keilwerth production facilities in Graslitz, now Kraslice, became part of the Czech Amati collective, however the first saxophones that Amati sold were still stamped with the "JGK - Best in the World" trademark, had the model name "Toneking" and had Julius Keilwerth serial numbers.

=== Changes in ownership ===
Boosey & Hawkes purchased Keilwerth in 1989 and merged the company with Schreiber in 1996. The combined company was sold to The Music Group in 2003. In 2006 The Music Group was broken up and Schreiber & Keilwerth became an independent company. In March 2010, Schreiber & Keilwerth filed for bankruptcy. On 1 August 2010 they were acquired by Buffet Crampon.

== Pre-1990 saxophone models ==
Historical models include:

- Soloist (early)
- King (early)
- Champion (early student)
- The New King (late prewar and postwar, informally grouped into Series I, II, III, IV, and V, base for stencils)
- Toneking (deluxe models produced concurrently with New King)

Most of these historical models were also available with different "packages", such as "EX" ("Exklusiv") with more elaborate engraving, additional keywork, additional mother-of-pearl inlay, or drawn and rolled tone holes.

Julius Keilwerth also produced a limited quantity of a trumpet called the "Toneking 3000". There may have been other brief forays into making other woodwinds or brasswinds, but no records were found as of February 2012.

In 1986 the company hired jazz saxophonist Peter Ponzol as a consultant to refine and redesign Keilwerth saxophones for the jazz market. This resulted in the "Modell Peter Ponzol" alto and tenor saxophones. The modern lineup of Keilwerth saxophones is derived from the Modell Peter Ponzol.

=== Stencil manufacture ===
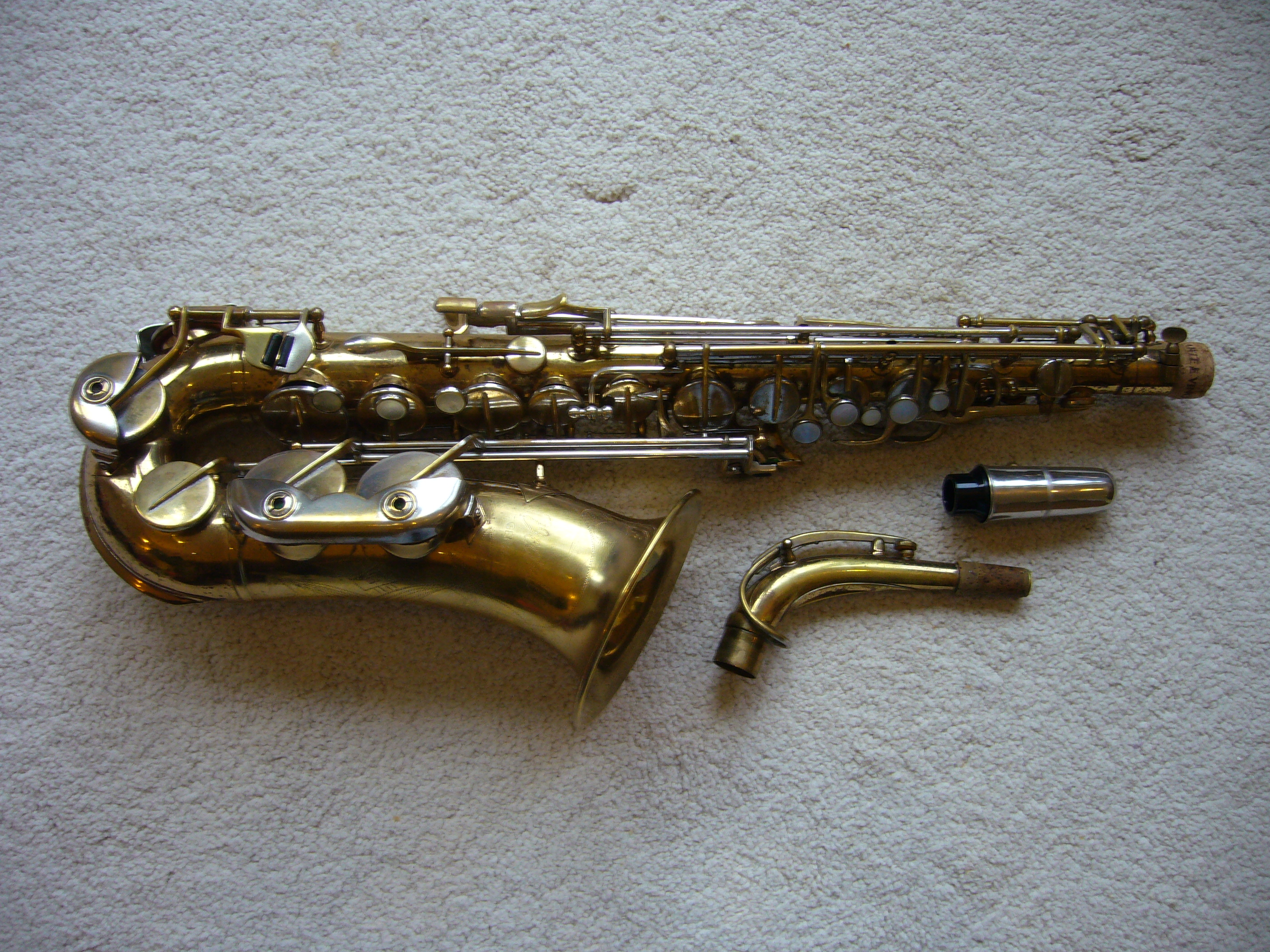
'Vedette' alto Saxophone - a "stencil" of the 'New King' Series IV made by Keilwerth circa 1968. Has straight tone-holes (not rolled) and is in two-tone finish i.e. nickel-plated keys on a lacquered body

A "stencil" saxophone is a saxophone made by a manufacturer that is then sold to another company that (perhaps literally) takes a stencil and engraves their own name/information on the horn. The Julius Keilwerth company provided not only complete saxophones to other companies as stencils, but also saxophone bodies for other companies to affix their own keywork to. As a general rule, Keilwerth stencil saxophones are stamped "Made in Germany". Some Keilwerth stencil models have rolled tone-holes, and others have conventional straight tone-holes.

Some of the best known of the Keilwerth stencils are those made for the W. T. Armstrong Company:-

- Some H. Couf Royalist saxophones, named for Herbert Couf, the vice president of the W. T. Armstrong Company (1965-1980s)
- H. Couf Superba I and II saxophones (1965-1980s)
- Conn DJH Modified after the 1981 acquisition of Armstrong by C. G. Conn, named after Daniel J. Henkin, owner of Conn (1981-1986)
- Armstrong Heritage saxophones

Note: later H. Couf models, like the 3200 and Royalist II were made by United Musical Instruments, not the Julius Keilwerth company.

Other significant complete-horn Keilwerth stencils include:-

- Academy
- Alexandre
- H. & A. Selmer Bundy Special (1950s-1960s)
- Buffet Expression
- Calvert Deluxe, Champion, Crestone
- Heritage
- Gotz
- Imperial
- Jazz King, Jubilee
- King Tempo saxophones (1960s)
- Major, Manhattan, Martelle, Marco, Miraphone
- PIA, Prelude (made for Hakkert)
- Ravoy, Reynolds, Richard Gareis, Roger, Royalist
- Silvertone, Star
- TAM, Troubadour
- US Admiral
- Vedette
- Vincent Albert
- Wikina, Winsall

Note: some saxophones (e.g., Voss, Roxy, Senator, and De Villiers etc.) that appear to have been made by Keilwerth were in fact manufactured by another German company called Dörfler & Jörka (also based in Nauheim) between 1949 and 1968. The design and location of the neck screw (which is completely different from the type used by Keilwerth) is a simple but accurate method of identifying Dörfler & Jörka instruments. D&J used a distinctive, large thumb screw located on the front of the receiver to tighten the neck, whereas Keilwerth used a traditional side-mounted screw.

Keilwerth stopped supplying stencil instruments after introduction of the Modell Peter Ponzol in the mid-to-late 1980s.

== Saxophones 1990–present ==
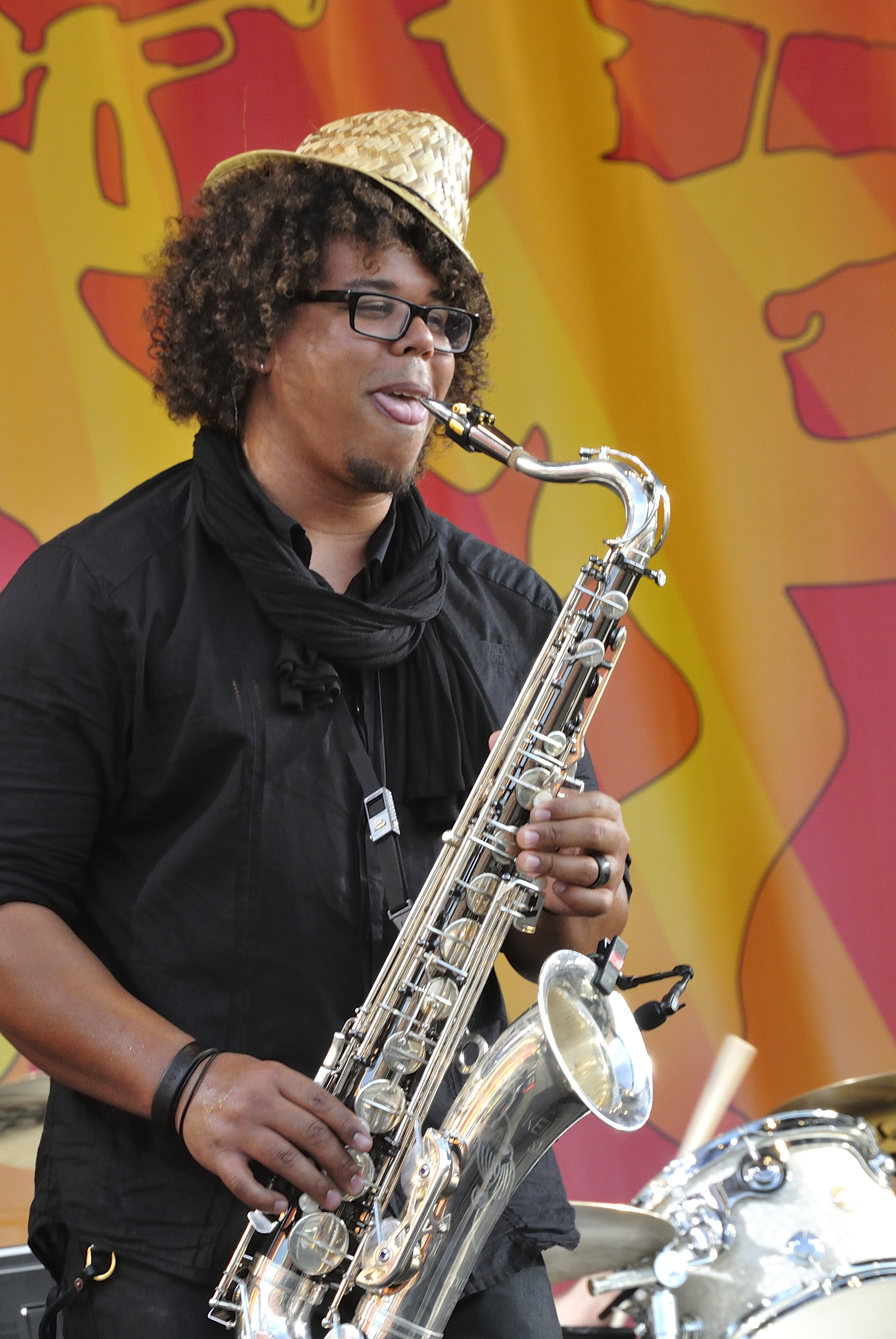
Jake Clemons playing a Keilwerth tenor

By the end of the 1980s, Keilwerth had introduced its SX90R series saxophones and gained endorsements from jazz musicians such as Branford Marsalis, Courtney Pine, Ernie Watts, Don Wise, James Moody, Ron Holloway, Mike Smith, Grover Washington, Jr. and David Liebman.

Julius Keilwerth markets a range of student/intermediate and professional saxophones, from the soprano to bass saxophones. As of 2009 Keilwerth produced ST90 student range, the EX90 intermediate range and the SX90, CX90, SX90R professional range, with the SX90R featuring soldered-on tonehole rings (distinct from rolled tonehole rims formed from the drawn chimneys). After 2010 the product line was consolidated to SX90 and SX90R professional instruments and ST series student/intermediate instruments. In 2013 Keilwerth introduced the MKX professional alto and tenor saxophones with a smaller bore for a more focused sound.

- SX90R: made in Germany by Keilwerth
- SX90: made in Germany by Keilwerth
- MKX: made in Germany by Keilwerth
- CX90: made in Germany by Keilwerth (discontinued after 2010)
- EX90 series I: made in Germany by Keilwerth
- EX90 series II: made in Germany by Keilwerth until 2003
- EX90 series III: Parts made in Germany by Keilwerth. Assembly and finishing by Amati in the Czech Republic (discontinued after 2010)
- ST90 series I: made in Germany by Keilwerth
- ST90 series II: Parts made in Germany by Keilwerth. Assembly and finishing by Amati in the Czech Republic until 2003
- ST90 series III: Made and assembled in Taiwan
- ST90 series IV: made in Taiwan by KHS (continued as ST series after 2010)
