= Floor tom =

Double-headed tom-tom drum

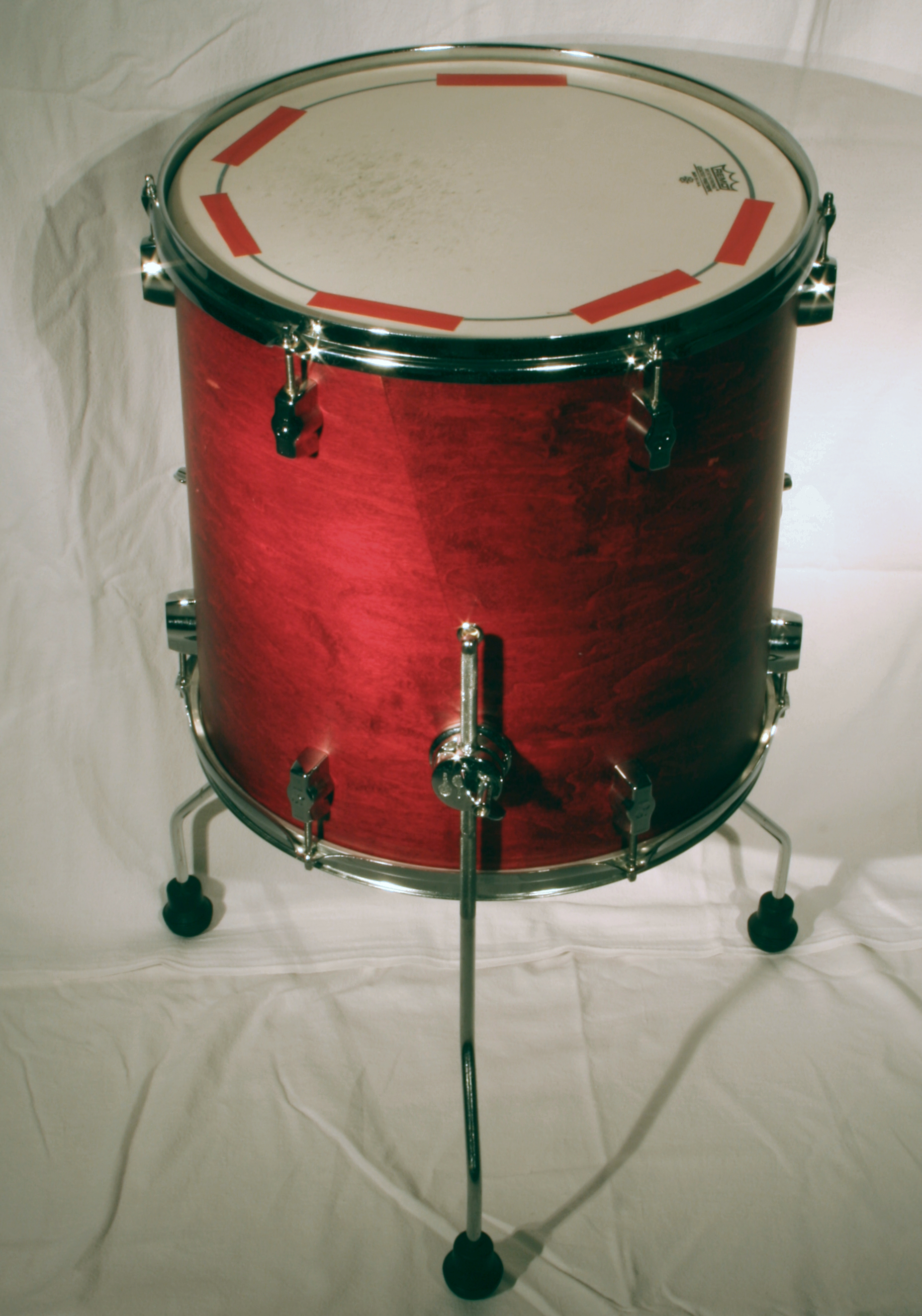
16x16 floor tom with traditional mounting

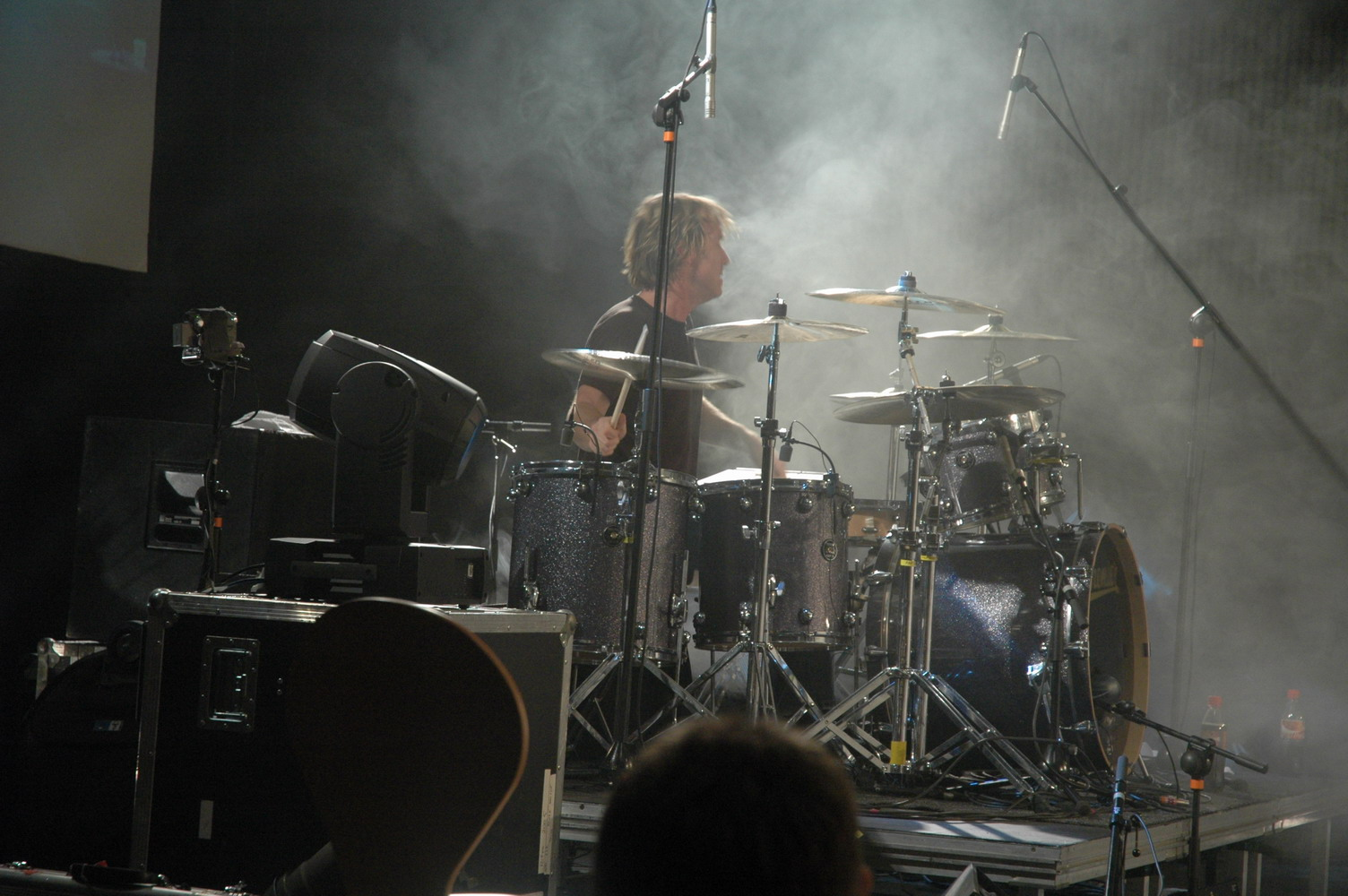
Paul Simmons with both 14x14 and 16x16 floor toms

A floor tom is a large double-headed tom-tom drum which usually stands on the floor on three legs. However, they can also be attached to a cymbal stand with a drum clamp, or supported by a rim mount. It is a cylindrical drum without snare wires, and tends to produce a booming, resonant sound which can vary in pitch. It is synonymous to the tenor drum in marching percussion and classical music.

The floor toms are the lowest tuned drums played with sticks on a regular drum set. Common sizes are

- 16x16, that is, 16 inches (41 cm) in both depth and diameter. This was the original size and is still most common.
- 14 inches (36 cm) × 14 for jazz and fusion kits, and very occasionally with a 16x16 as well.
- 18x16; that is, 18 inches (46 cm) in diameter and 16 in depth, the most common size for a second floor tom, used with a 16x16.
- 16x18, a rarer size sometimes used for a second floor tom, also with a 16 × 16.

Floor toms can be mounted:

- In the traditional manner, with three adjustable legs.
- On three legs but connected to them by means of a rim mount on the lower rim, the original floor tom rim mounting.
- Attached to a drum rack or a (very heavy duty) cymbal stand by means of a rim mount on the top or bottom rim.
- Attached to a drum rack or a cymbal stand by means of a standard hanging tom mount on the drum shell. This method is generally restricted to the smaller, 14x14 floor toms.

The floor tom was popularized by Gene Krupa in the 1950s, using a 16x16. The floor tom is also used as a small bass drum by some (mostly jazz) drummers. In that case it is mounted horizontally on a specially designed rack system. More recently, companies such as Pearl have come out with "floor tom to bass drum conversion sets". These commonly consist of strategically shaped rods that one can put in place of the floor tom legs to stand it up horizontally. Under this method, it is fairly common that a drummer get appropriately sized bass drum hoops to complete the conversion process.

Floor toms are also used in music parades, often being carried and then lifted up and hit to add effect. It can also be used as a substitute for surdo in samba and bossa eir. These drums are also found in a jazz band drum kit.
