= Rim mount =

Drum kit accessory

A rim mount is a drum kit accessory that allows a drum to be supported without any contact to its shell. The rim mount attaches instead to the drum rim or hoop.

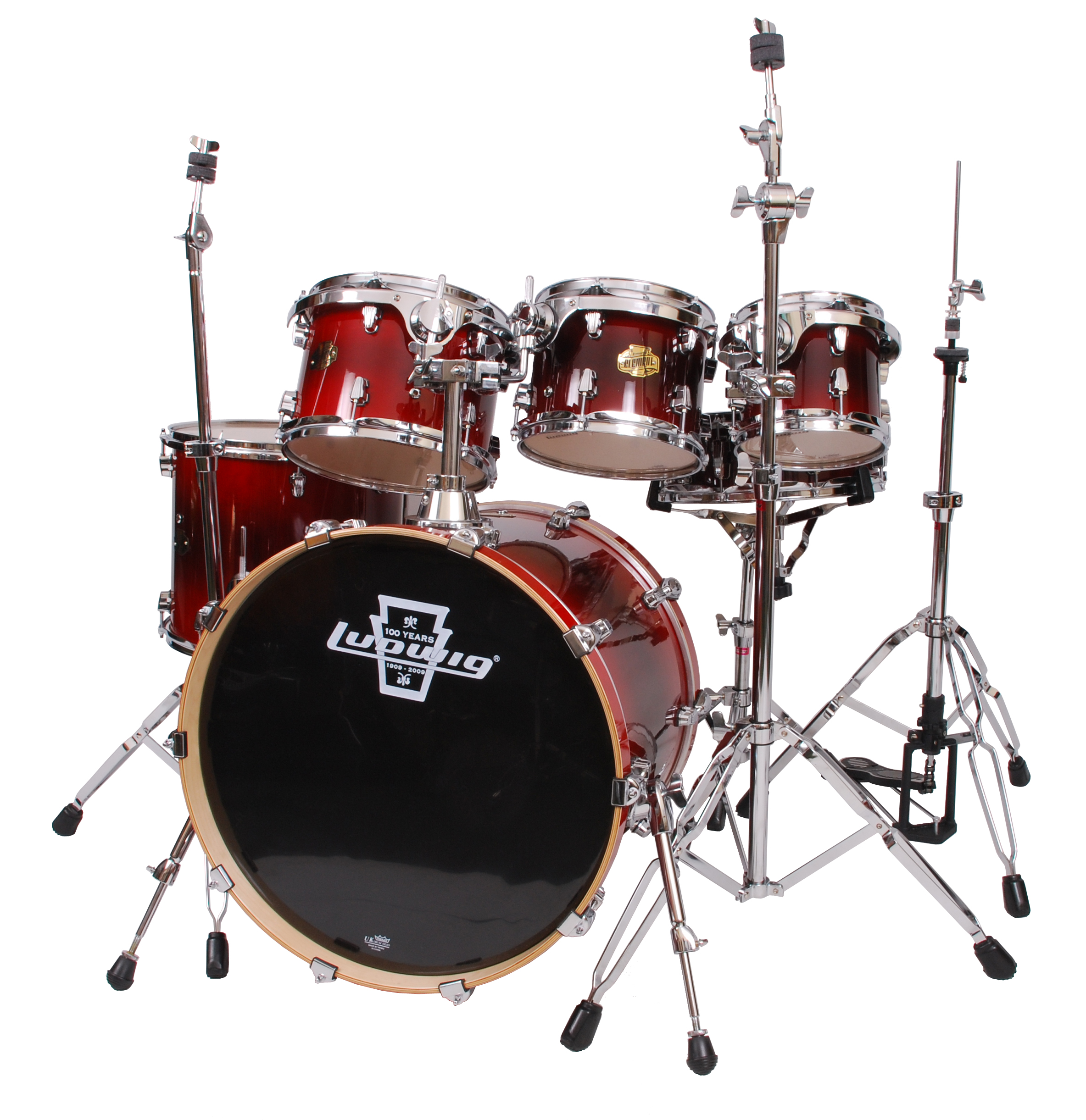
Drum kit with rim mounts on the three hanging toms

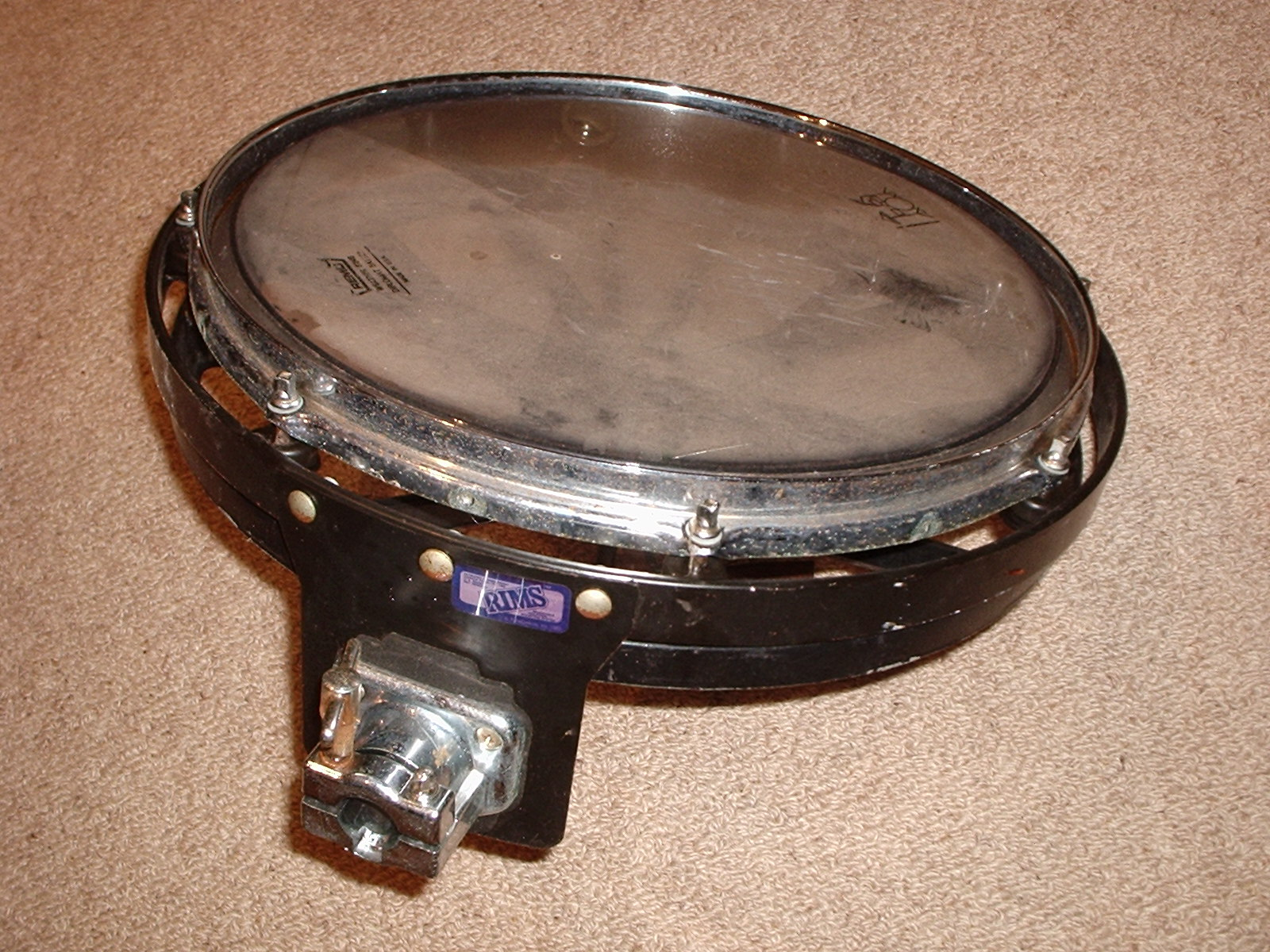
14" rototom on an original RIMS rim mount, allowing it to be suspended from a standard tom arm

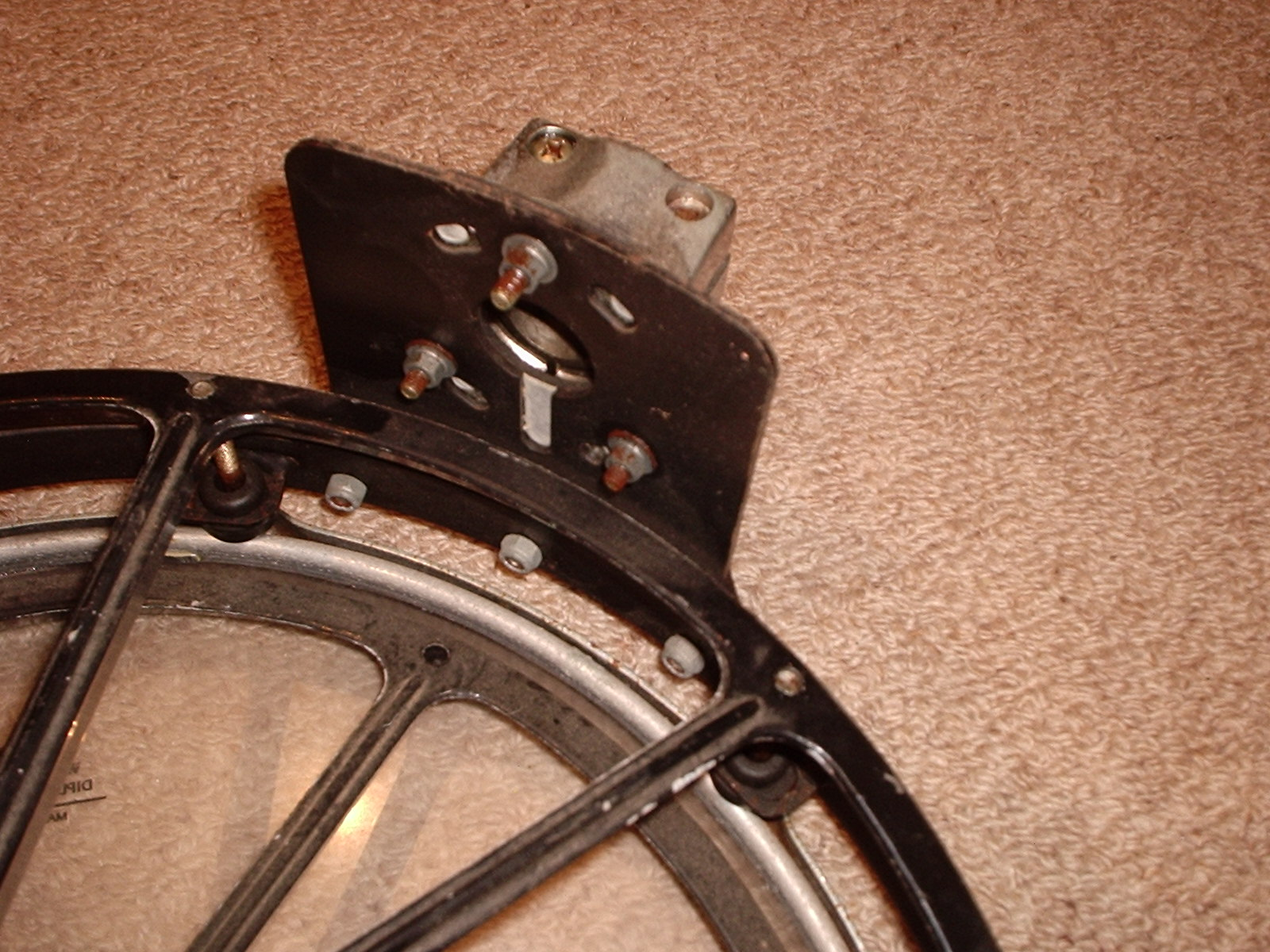
Detail of rim mount, here using a genuine Pearl 20mm tom mount on a universal mounting plate that takes most mounts

Most commonly used for hanging toms, they are also available for floor toms, and more rarely for bass drums and snare drums. Hanging tom and snare drum rim mounts use a standard hanging tom mount, but attached to the rim mount rather than directly to the drum. Bass drum rim mounts use special-purpose clamps to attach to a drum rack. Floor tom rim mounts may be attached to a rack, or provide places for the three traditional floor tom feet to attach.

Bulkier and heavier than traditional mounts, they generally require drum cases one size larger.

== History ==
The earliest rim mounts were developed by Gary Gauger and first became available in 1980 as aftermarket accessories, under the registered name RIMS, standing for Resonance Isolation Mounting System. It was more than ten years before major manufacturers began to offer them as an extra cost option. These days they are offered by most major manufacturers, and common on high-end kits, particularly for high-volume situations.

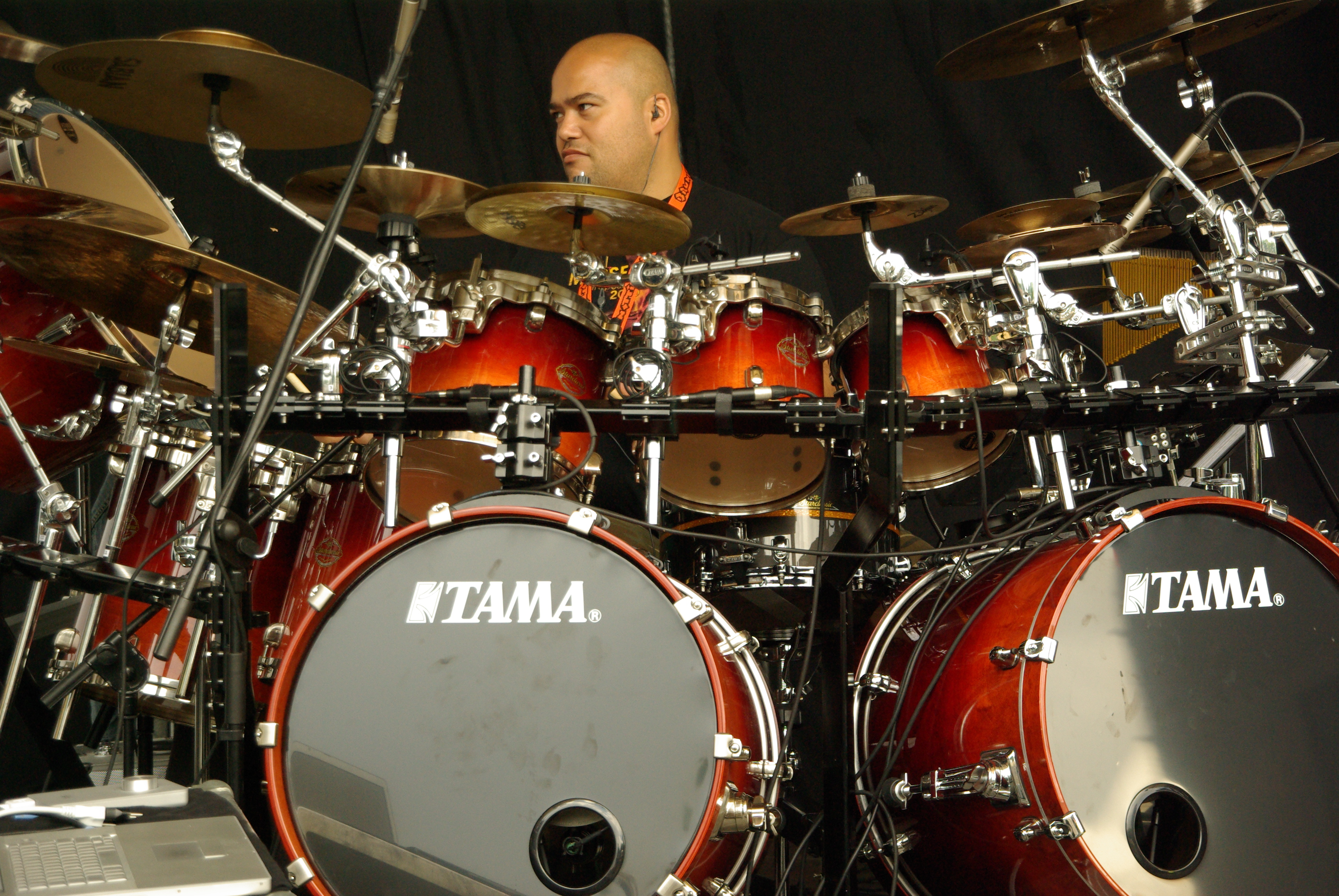
Collin Leijenaar with rim mounted hanging toms, floor toms and bass drums
