= Pavel Romanov (percussionist) =

Pavel Romanov Russian: Павел Романов
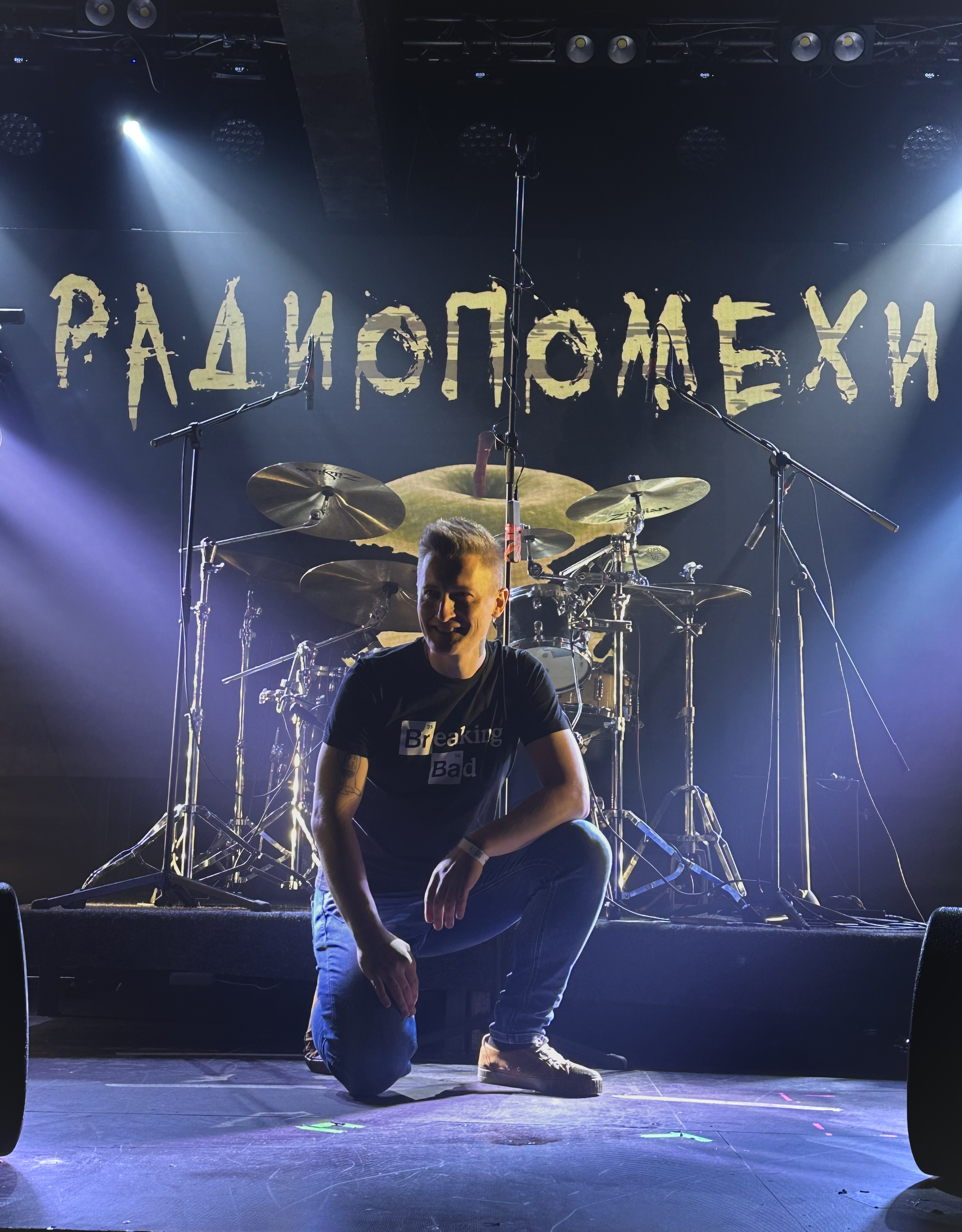

Background information
- Born: Russian: Павел Романов; March 27, 1989 (age 36); Vologda, Vologda Oblast, RSFSR, USSR
- Origin: USSR — Russia
- Genres: Rock music, pop music, metal rock
- Occupations: Musician, drummer
- Instruments: Percussion, drums
- Years active: 2002–present

Pavel Romanov (Russian: Павел Романов; born 27 March 1989, Vologda, Vologda Oblast, RSFSR, USSR) is a Russian rock musician, drummer, teacher, and songwriter. He was formerly a member of the rock band Real Shamrocks.

== Biography ==
Pavel Romanov was born on 27 March 1989 in Vologda. From 1996 to 2002, he studied at Children's Music School No. 1 in Vologda. He was the drummer for Real Shamrocks, one of the most prominent bands in Vologda Oblast, known for performing Irish folk-rock.

== Career ==
The rights to the singles of Real Shamrocks were acquired by radio stations in Malaysia and Ireland, including All Irish Radio.

As a member of Real Shamrocks, Pavel Romanov participated in international tours.

=== Concerts and collaborations ===
After moving to St. Petersburg, Romanov collaborated with the youth theater On the Verge, where he was responsible for arrangements and writing percussion parts. He also performed with the indie rock band Whatevers and the musical group Anna Karenina.

Romanov is the winner of the All-Russian musical competition Metro on Stage (Moscow, 2012) and the XX Anniversary All-Russian Festival Russian Student Spring (2012).

In addition to his work with Radio Interference, Pavel collaborates with projects that perform cover versions of popular hits. His portfolio includes notable performances of drum parts in diverse songs such as "Vasya" by Bravo, "Rains-Pistols" by Zveri, "Beautiful Old House" by Andrey Knyazev and Helavisa, "The Chicken" by Jaco Pastorius, and many others.
