= Drum tuning =

Process of adjusting the frequency or pitch of a drum

Drum tuning is the process of adjusting the frequency or pitch of a drum. Although most drums are unpitched instruments, they still have a fundamental pitch and overtones. Drums require tuning for a variety of reasons: to sound good together as a kit, to sound pleasing as an individual drum, to achieve the desired amount of ringing and resonance, and to produce the sound that fits the music. Some drums such as timpani and rototoms are tuned to a definite pitch. Drums are tuned by tightening or loosening the tension rods or ropes, which control the tension on the drumhead. Additional techniques such as muffling may also be used to affect resonance.

== Styles ==
=== Snare drum ===
- The thin, sensitive bottom (resonant) head is generally tuned higher than the batter head, to deaden the tendency for lengthy, ringing resonance.
- The resonant head on a 14-inch snare drum is tuned to a range of 330–391 Hz (E_{4} to G_{4}), depending on the overall tuning of the drum kit. Overtightening risks damaging the head; the recommended maximum is 400 Hz.
- The top, batter head of a 14-inch snare drum is tuned to a range of 220–349 Hz (A_{3} to F_{4}), generally a specific interval lower than the resonant head. The most common interval is a perfect fifth. Other choices include perfect fourth and major third.
- Treatment or muffling may be applied to any type of drum head to deaden resonances and control overtones.

=== Bass or kick drum ===
- The resonant (front) head is usually looser than the batter head and is mainly responsible for the fundamental, audible tone of the bass drum.
- The resonant head may have a small (usually about 6" in diameter) offset hole to allow for air pressure to escape and to support the insertion of a microphone for recording. However, bass drums with a mic hole will usually have a less "round" sound than those without a hole.
- Some drummers choose muffle the bass drum tone by inserting a towel, blanket, pillow, or similar material inside the bass drum. This will cause the drum to sound more dampened and less "boomy", which is preferable in many situations such as recording or playing in small venues.

=== Tom toms ===
Tuning toms is the act of ensuring that:

- The tensions on the individual batter and resonant heads on each drum are consistent and deliver a clear tone;
- The tensions on the heads deliver the desired fundamental pitch when struck;
- The relationships between the batter head and resonant head provide a sound character suitable for the intended use; and
- The relationships between individual drums and the overall drum set provide a logical and pleasant sounding combination.

When tuning a drum, drummers must keep in mind that the top (batter) head controls attack and ring, while the bottom head controls resonance, sustain, overtones, and timbre.

== Rod and key tuning ==
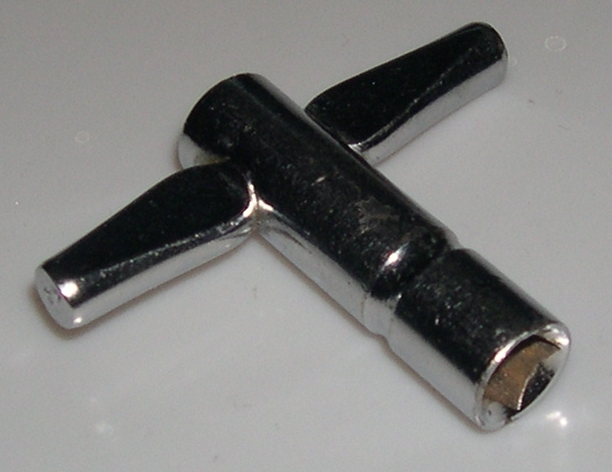
A drum key

=== Drum key ===
A drum key or drum tuning key is a tool used to adjust the tension rods of a drum, to change the pitch. It is also used to adjust drum hardware.

The most common pattern fits a square-head tension rod. There are minor variations of size between makers.

=== Process ===
- Checking that the physical condition of the drum, drum head and hardware that is to be used are in appropriate condition.
- Seating the head to shape the generic factory-shaped head to match the specific drum being used.
- Tuning the batter head to pitch.
- Tuning the resonant head to pitch relative to the batter head.
- Relating each drum's pitch and sustain to the other drums in the drum set in accordance with the drummer's requirements.

When tensioning a head, the tensioning rod closest to the tensioner should be tightened first. The reason for this is to keep an even tension across the drum head, which is impossible to do if the lugs are tightened differently. Next, the tension rod opposite the first lug is tightened by the same number of turns. The process is repeated for the remaining lugs in order, moving from one side of the head to the other.

When all of the rods are tightened, the first rod is once again tightened, and the process is repeated once again for each rod until the head is free of wrinkles and a very low tone is produced when hit.

The rods are further tightened in order and incrementally, by no more than a quarter turn each time. From time to time, the head is tapped next to each tension rod and the rods are tightened and loosened so that the tones are the same all around the drum.

The procedure is repeated until the head has the desired pitch. At times it may be desirable to use a specific key or individual musical notes to tune each drum to, creating more melodic tones and a more musical sound to the drums. The head is tapped once more around the edge to ensure even tuning. If double-headed drums are used, the procedure needs to be repeated with the bottom head.

=== Single-tension ===
Single-tension is one of several ways to apply the necessary tension to drum heads. Single-tension systems largely replaced the ancient rope-tension methods in the late 19th century and are still used today in lower-priced drums for student use. In this system, one long tension rod with a threaded end extends through the hoop holding the top drum head and then down outside the drum shell to a threaded hole in the bottom hoop. There usually is a small guide halfway down on single-tension drum shells to keep the tension rods straight. In older drums, the hoops are often held tight by separate clamps through which the threaded tension rod fits. Tension is applied by turning a special key that fits into a hexagonal drive, but many bass drums (especially those models designed for concert use) have permanent wing-nuts permanently affixed to each tension rod, even on double-tension drums.

=== Double-tension ===
Double-tension is a method of applying tension to drum heads. Drum manufacturers use several methods to apply tension to drum heads; the preferred way is to tighten the heads with a hoop that is held tight to the drum shell with a number of individual threaded rods which connect to stanchions mounted with bolts onto the outside of the drum shell. When there are individual stanchions for both the lower head and the upper "struck" head, or when there is one common center-mounted stanchion that accepts the threaded rods from both the upper and lower drum heads, that is said to be a double-tension drum.

== Rope tension ==
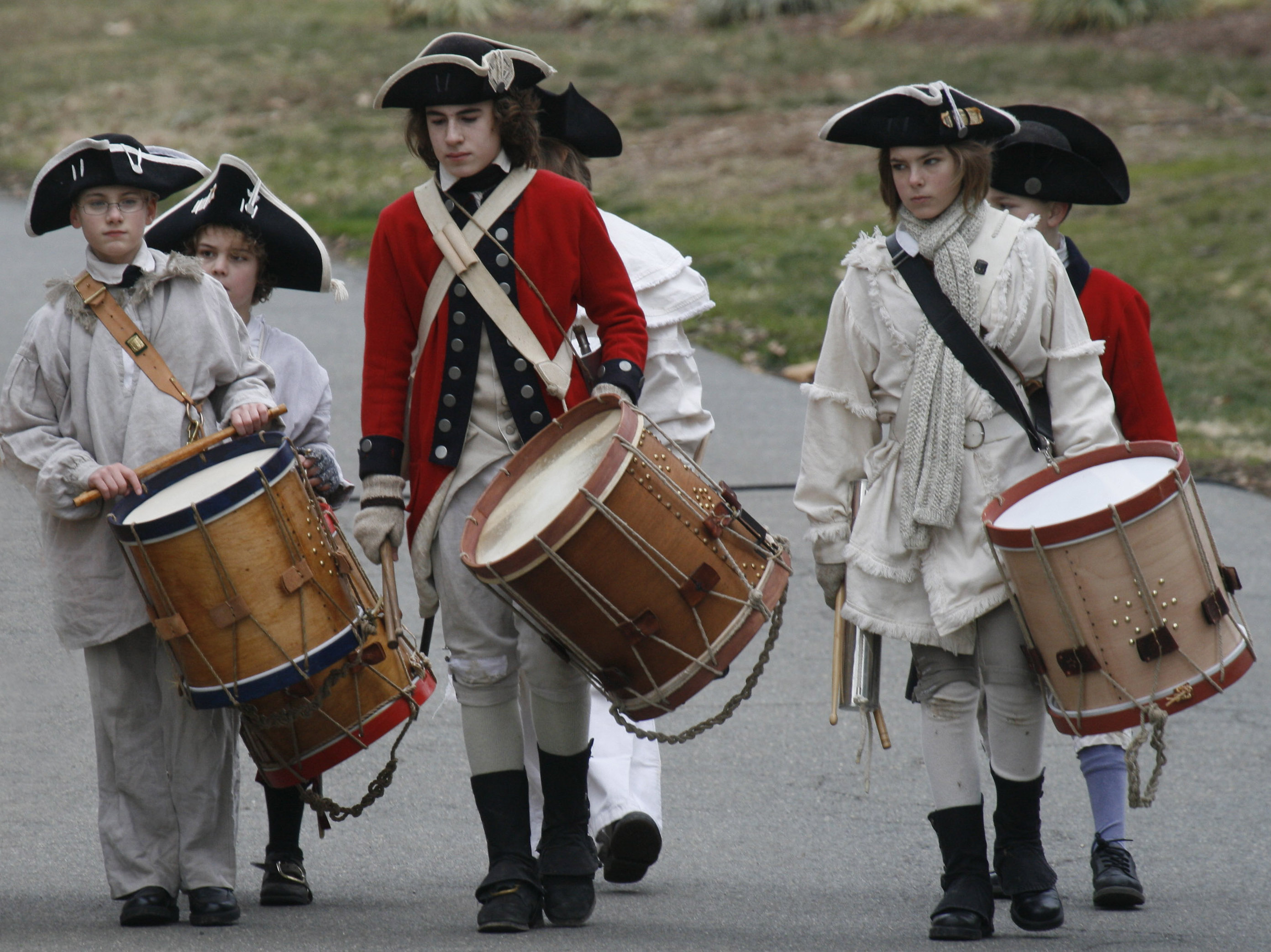
Historical reenactors with rope-tuned drums

Rope-tension is the oldest system for applying tension to drum heads and was the standard system used until the late 19th century. A long rope (or less commonly, a series of ropes) is passed alternately between the top and bottom drum head hoops that are held to the shell by clamps that incorporate holes for the rope(s). The ropes are made tighter by sewn-together loops called 'ears', usually made of leather, which slide along the rope to pull the hoops inward, tightening the drum heads. These ears remain in position due to the tension of the rope. Drum heads tightened in this manner are not as tense as more modern single-tension or double-tension systems, but offer a historically deep tone in keeping with the heritage of certain music, such as Pipe and Drum Corps, Fife and Drum Corps, and historical military bands such as Field Music ensembles that were common during the American Revolutionary War, the War of 1812, and the American Civil War periods.

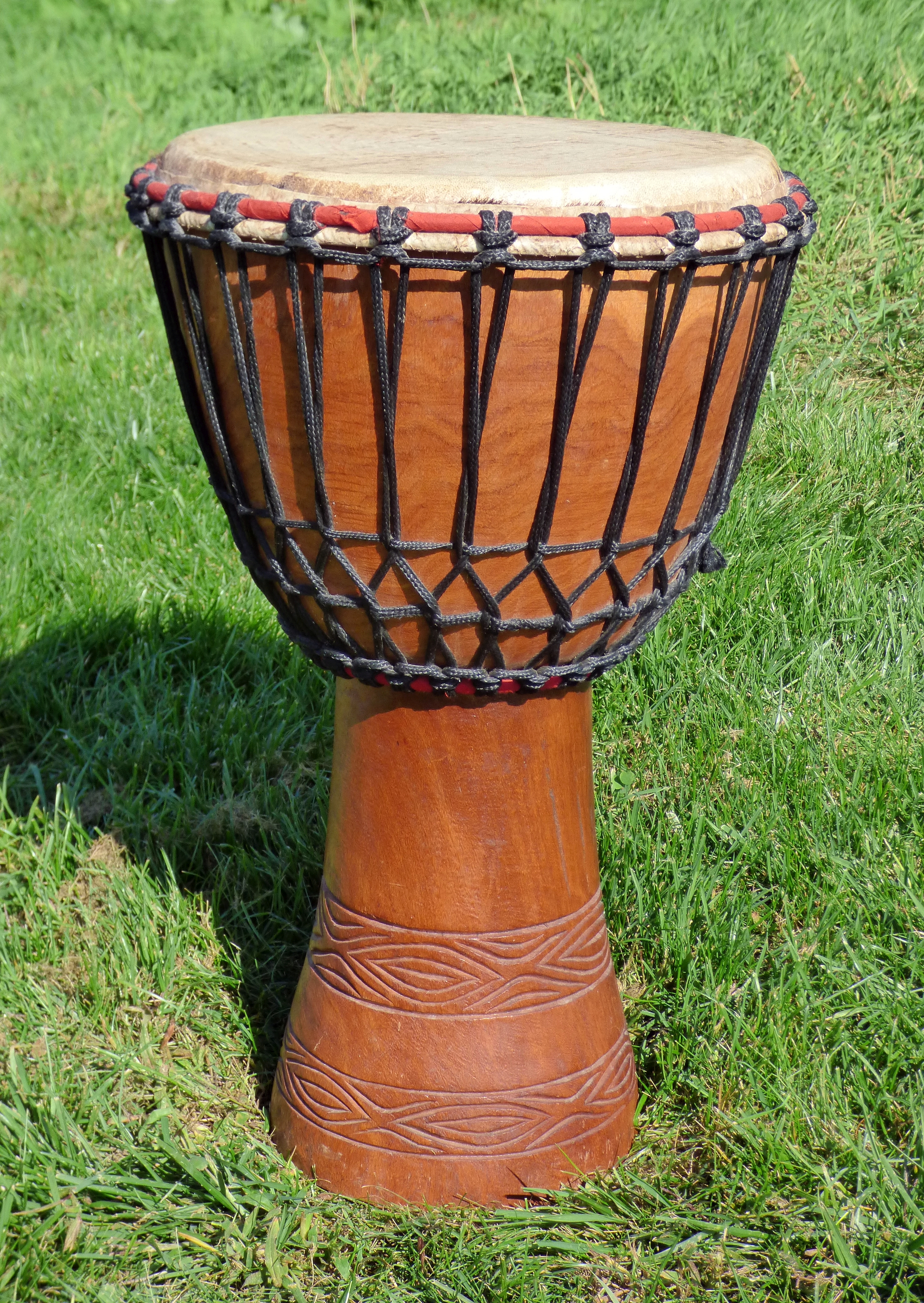
A rope-tuned djembe

Other systems of rope tuning are used outside the Western tradition, such as the "Mali weave" used to tune the djembe.

== Muffling ==
Many percussionists prefer a more dry sound with less ring. There are many different techniques that can be used to reduce ring.

One approach is to loosen the batter head a quarter to a half turn. Another way is to either increase or decrease the pitch of the bottom head so that it's different from the pitch of the top head. Either of these approaches produces a slightly more dry, funkier sound.

If unwanted ring is not eliminated—or if these types of heads produce unwanted tones—then there are multiple external muffling techniques that may be used, including:

- Using a commercial muffling device, which resemble Mylar "O" rings. This is a common approach and homemade muffling rings can be made by cutting up an old drum head. Some of these come with multiple rings of different sizes; layering multiple rings on top of each other increases or decreases the muffling effect.
- Placing a strip of duct tape on the batter head. Different lengths of tape, and different positions for the tape on the drum head can cause different sounds. Use of multiple strips causes a heavier muffle.
- Taping a tissue or napkin to the rim of the drum, and letting it lay loose on the batter head. Again, different thicknesses and positions create different sounds.
- For toms and snares, moongel can be used to reduce overtones. The bigger the piece of gel, the more the sound is muffled.
- An "old school" muffling technique is to cut a long strip of felt and mount it underneath the batter head on a tom or snare, or across the front bass drum head. However, many modern drummers dismiss felt muffling as dated and feel that the felt strip interferes with the seating of the head to the drum's bearing edge, making the drum slightly more difficult to tune.
- Putting a pillow inside the drum (for bass drums). The amount of muffling is controlled by how much of the pillow touches the front or rear heads; the less contact, the less muffling. Some companies produce dedicated bass drum mufflers that look like odd-shaped pillows; these work in the same fashion.
- Cutting a hole in the front head, or porting it, is an option for bass drums. The hole eliminates much of the drum's natural resonance and creates a drier, punchier sound with a more defined attack. The larger the hole, the less the audible resonance.

== Bibliography ==
- Fundamental Modes Of A Circular Membrane With Radial Constraints On The Boundary

Wang C.Y. Journal of Sound and Vibration, February 1999, vol. 220, no. 3, pp. 559–563, Ingenta.

- Comments On “Fundamental Frequency Of A Wavy Non-Homogeneous Circular Membrane”

Laura P.A.A.; Rossit C.A.; Bambill D.V. Journal of Sound and Vibration, December 2000, vol. 238, no. 4, pp. 720–722, Ingenta.
