= Cymbal stand =

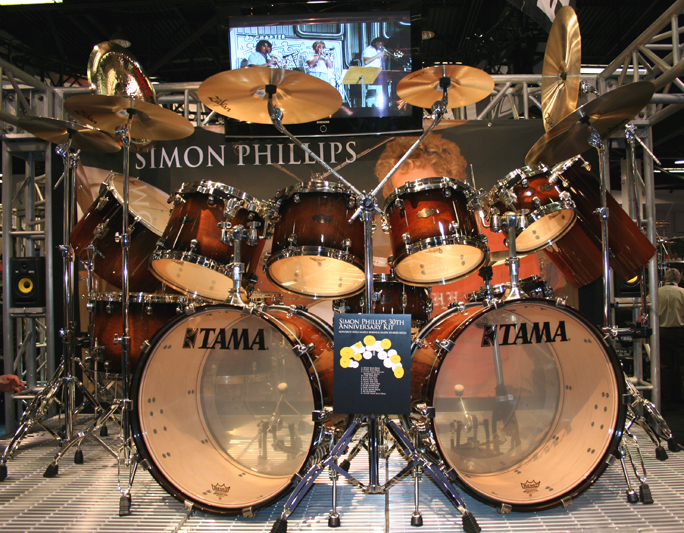
A Simon Phillips drum kit using straight, boom and multiple boom stands.

A cymbal stand is a stand designed primarily to support a suspended cymbal in a drum kit or percussion section.

There are many forms, including:

- Straight stands.
- Simple boom stands.
- Counterweighted boom stands.
- Zero-offset boom stands.
- Multiple boom stands.

The hi-hat stand is a stand for supporting and operating a pair of clash cymbals; The term cymbal stand in English does not normally include this specialised stand.

As well as cymbals, cymbal stands are used to support many other small percussion instruments, and accessories such as practice pads.

== History ==
Although very ancient examples of single cymbals have been found, all ancient references to cymbals and related instruments have them played in pairs similar to modern clash cymbals.

The first modern use of a single cymbal was the orchestral use of a suspended cymbal, using one of a pair suspended by its strap. As suspended cymbals became more common, stands were devised to support them from below. However, even towards the middle of the twentieth century, there was no provision for tilting the cymbal. Cymbals were supported in the same horizontal position as a cymbal suspended by its strap, by brackets affixed to drums, particularly to bass drums, and increasingly on stands. Such horizontal mounting required neither upper felt nor wingnut.

Increasing drum kit sizes and increasingly elaborate drum kit parts led to development of versatile modern stands, that allow cymbals to be secured and positioned in almost any position and at almost any angle.

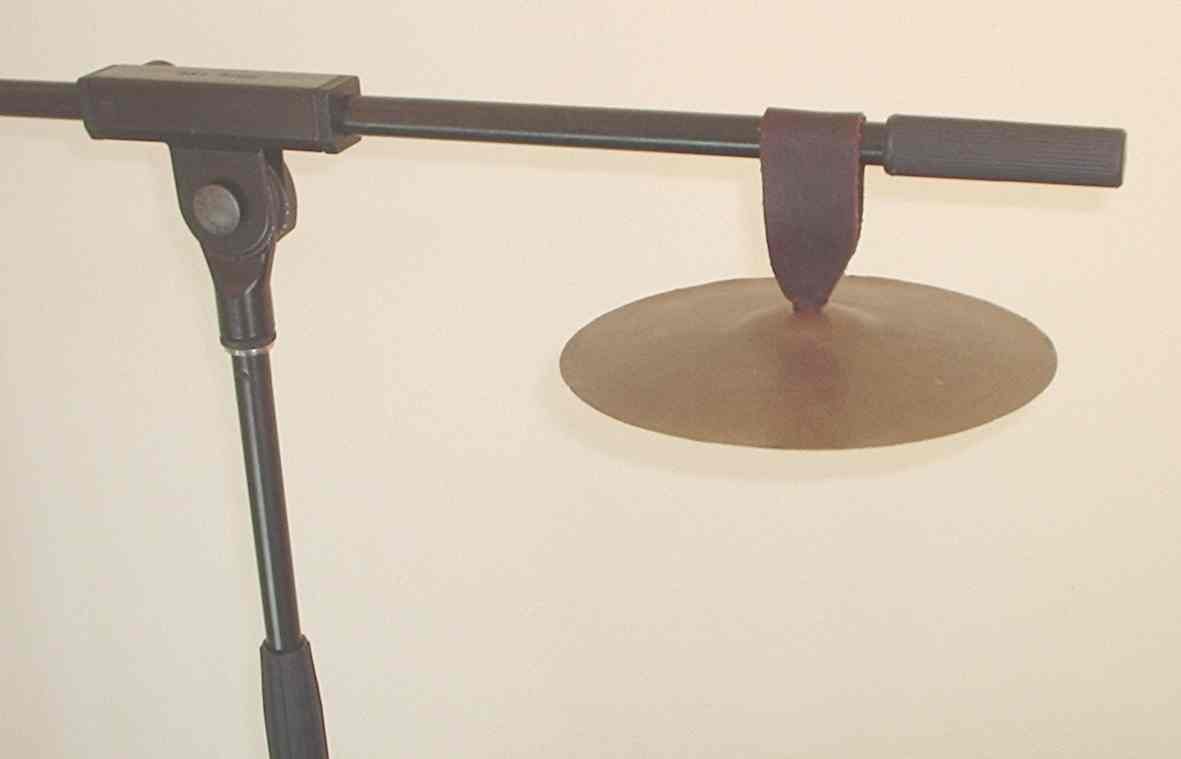
Cymbal suspended by its strap

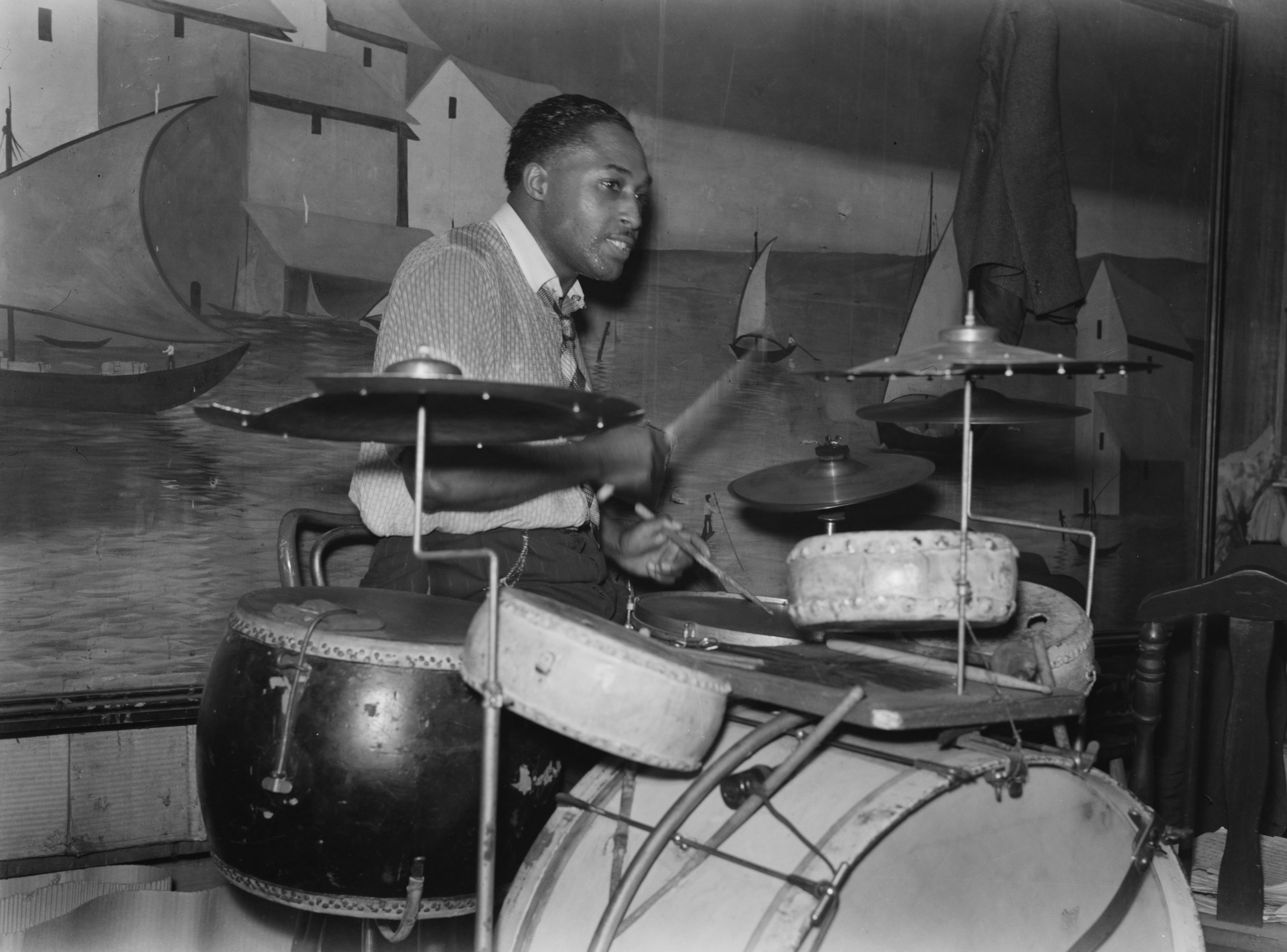
Unnamed drummer, 1939, note the nearest three cymbals have no tilit buttons, upper felts or wingnuts

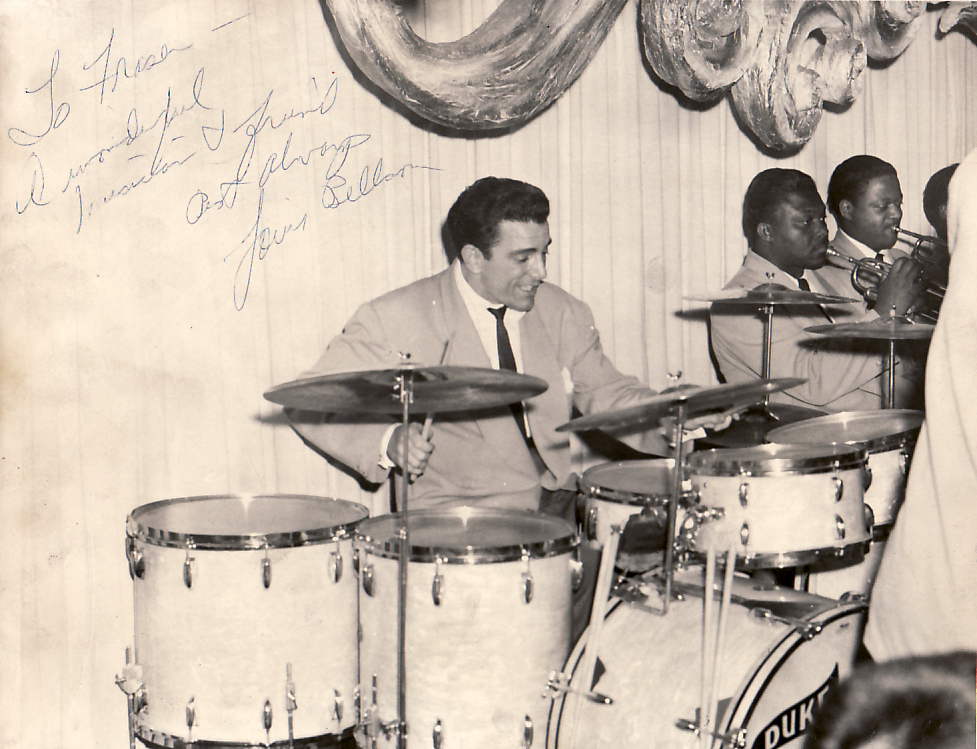
Louis Bellson, 1952, using tilted cymbals secured with upper felts and wingnuts

== Straight stands ==
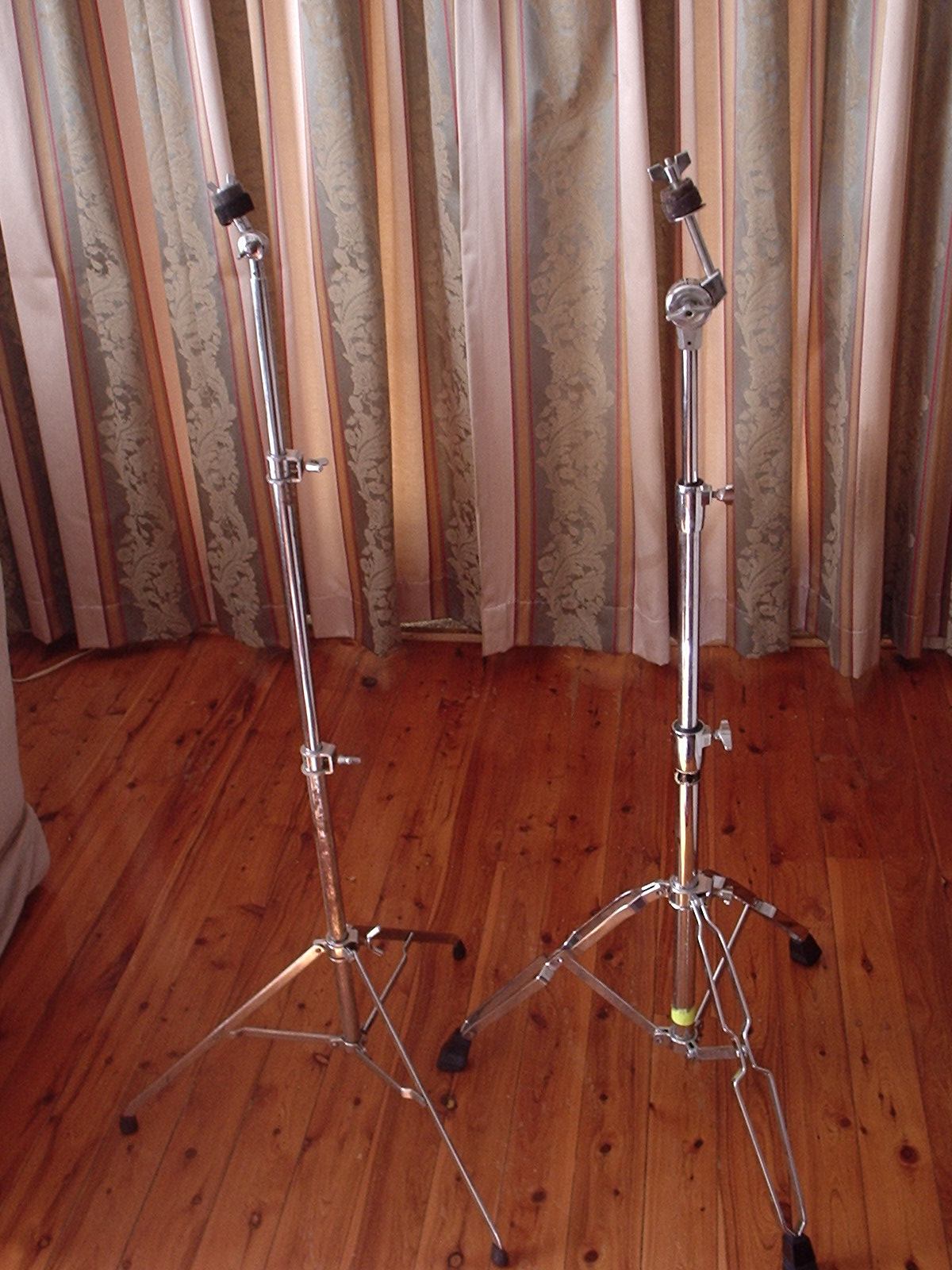
Straight stands

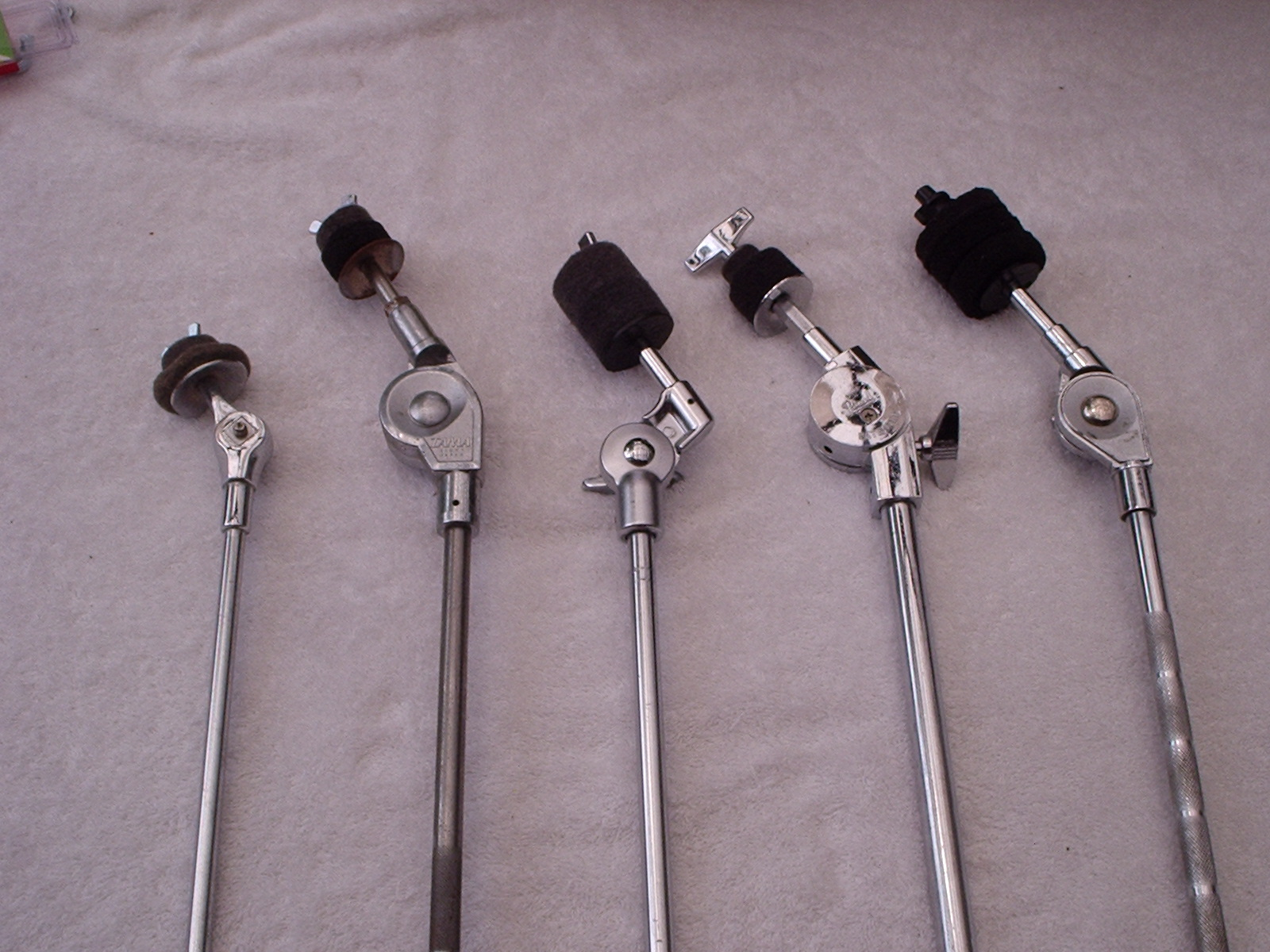
Five cymbal stand heads showing the button and mounting bolt

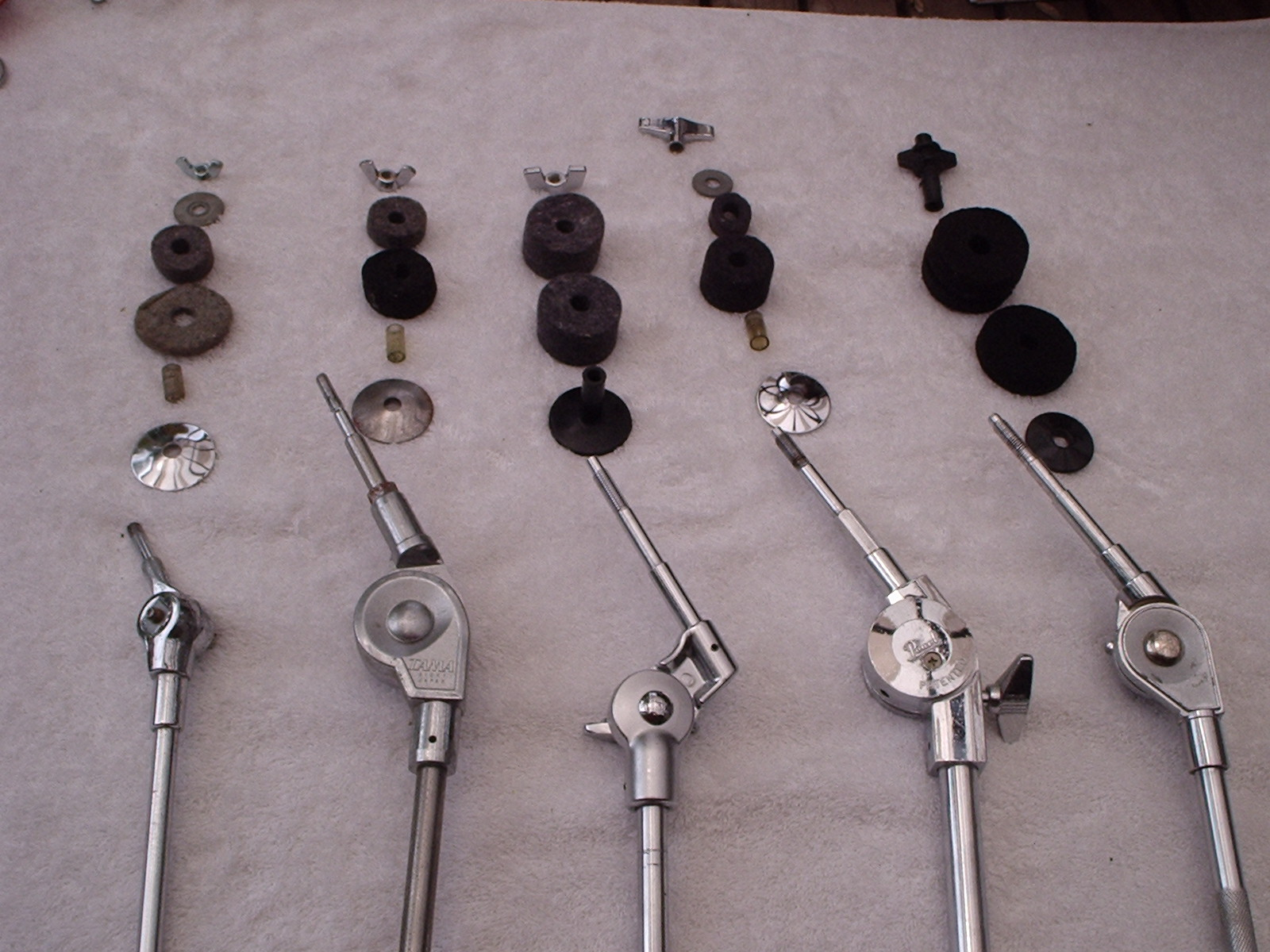
Exploded views showing various patterns of washers, sleeve and nut

The simplest free-standing cymbal stands consist of a metal tripod with two or three concentric tubes allowing height adjustment, and a button at the top to allow angle adjustment. Above the button, a mounting bolt goes through the cymbal.

Below the cymbal, the mounting bolt passes through first a dome washer and then a bottom felt, which support the cymbal. The bolt then passes through the cymbal. The part of the mounting bolt that passes through the cymbal is separated from the cymbal by a sleeve, most commonly of plastic, which protects the metal cymbal from contact with the metal bolt. Omission of this sleeve by beginners is common, and leads to keyhole damage to the cymbal mounting hole, and often also to cracking around the hole.

Instead of a metal dome washer and separate plastic sleeve, some stands use a plastic bottom washer, either domed or flat, combined with the sleeve as a single piece.

Above the cymbal is a top felt, above which may be a flat washer but this is sometimes omitted to allow looser mounting of the cymbal, and last a wingnut or cymbal nut.

When threaded mounting bolts and wingnuts were first introduced, the standard mounting bolt thread was 1/4" BSW, similar to a light camera case screw, but 6M and 8M metric threads are also now common. At first simple metal wingnuts were used, but specialised cymbal nuts were soon introduced.

Modern cymbal nuts come in two main varieties, the older being a metal wingnut with an extended metal thread, the more recent being a plastic wingnut in which the thread extension also serves as the mounting bolt sleeve. These plastic wingnuts are most commonly added as an aftermarket accessory, but are not compatible with a combined lower washer and sleeve.

There are many commercially available variations on this basic pattern, involving for example springs for looser suspension, hemispherical rubber washers for tighter suspension, or quick-release mechanisms in place of the nut. Some drummers replace the dome washer with a wooden washer or even a spherical or hemispherical wooden bead, with or without a bottom felt, to increase the sustain of the cymbal. The top felt may even be omitted for heavier cymbals mounted close to horizontal, also to increase sustain.

Straight stands were popular before the advent of boom stands, and remain popular where space is limited or for supporting heavier cymbals. A five-piece kit sold complete with hardware will typically come with one straight and one boom stand.

== Boom stands ==
A boom stand adds a second angle adjustment to the straight stand, allowing more flexibility in positioning of the cymbal.

=== Counterweighted boom stands ===
Addition of a counterweight to the boom allows use of longer booms and/or heavier cymbals.

=== Zero-offset boom stands ===
Zero-offset boom stands use a slightly more complex mechanism that allows the boom to telescope into the stand body when positioned vertically. Such stands can function as either a straight or boom stand, but cannot be fitted with a counterweight.

=== Multiple boom stands ===
Some stands are designed to support more than one cymbal by use of multiple booms. Such stands often use the same 20mm tube standardised by Pearl for tom-tom mounts and common on drum racks.

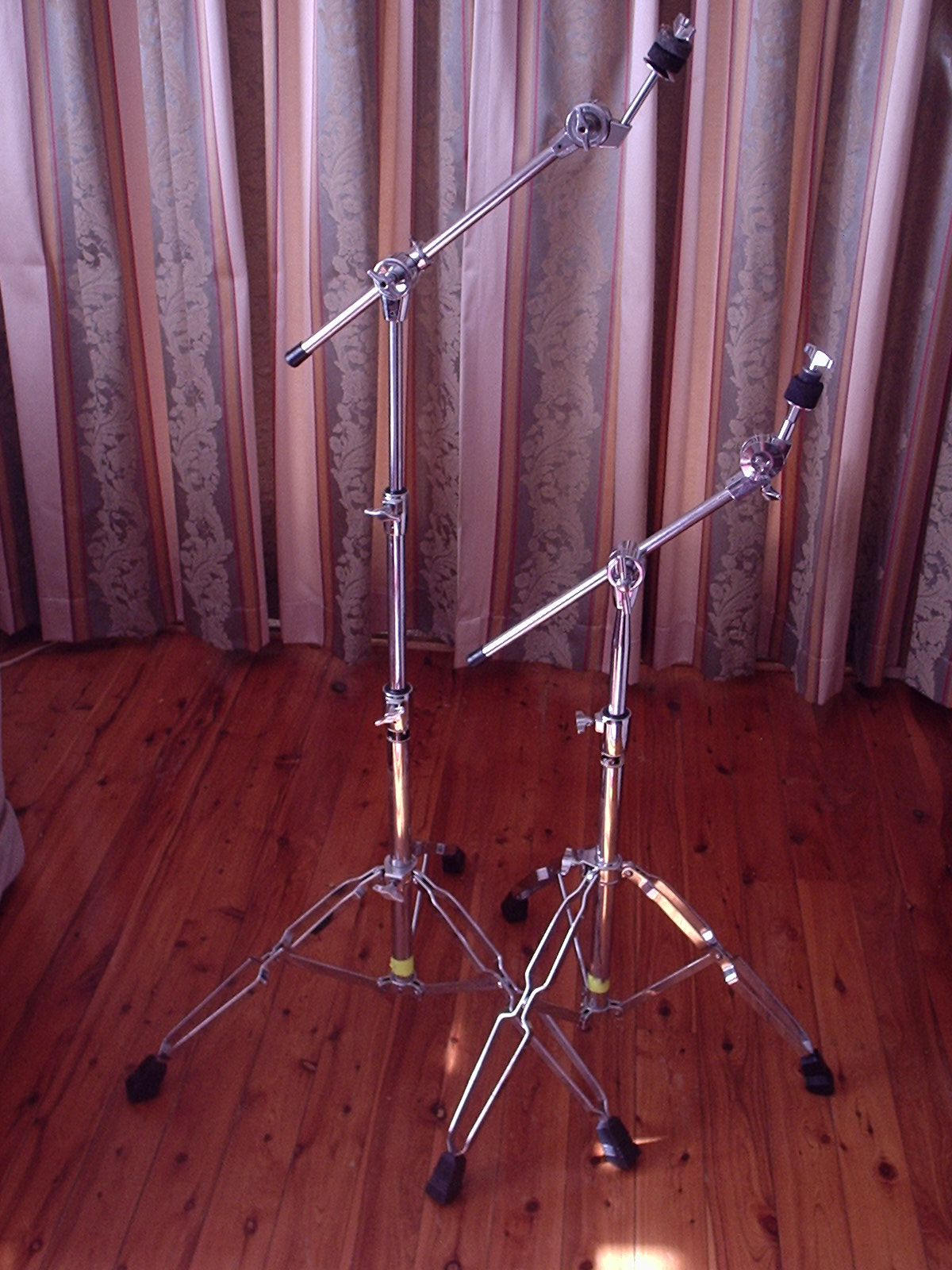
Simple boom stands. The rightmost one is specially configured to support a ride cymbal.

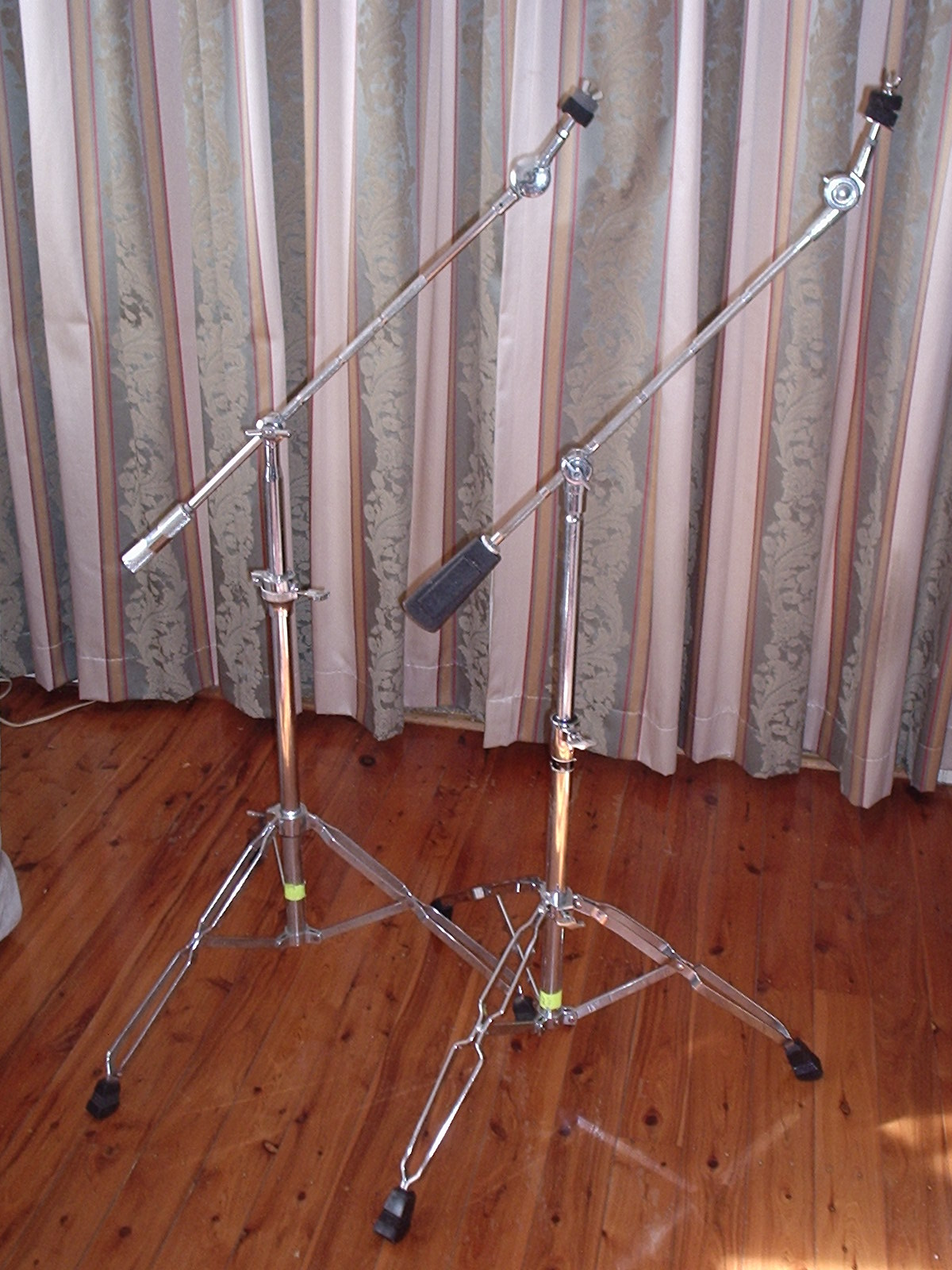
Counterweighted boom stands

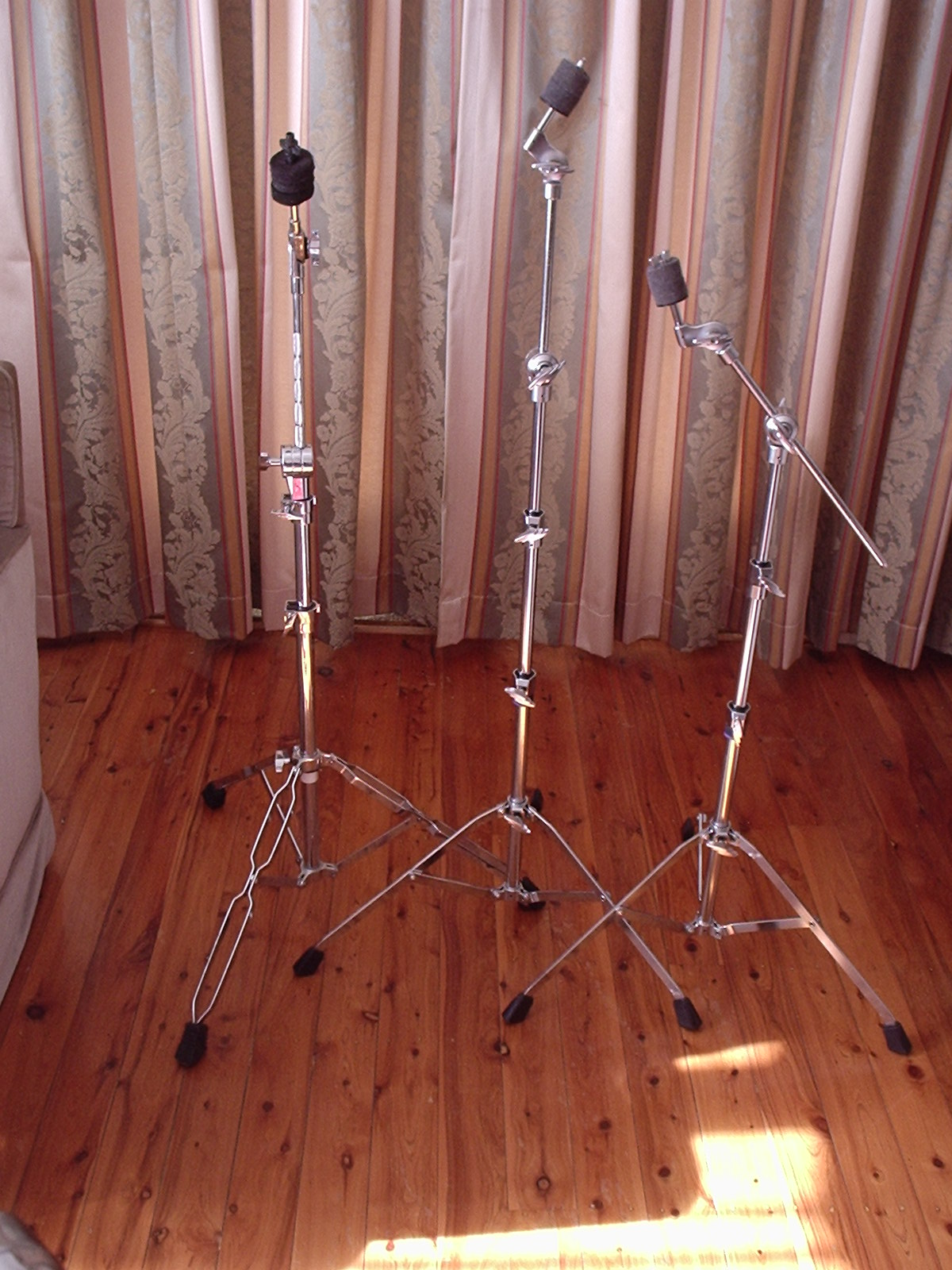
Three zero offset booms. The centre and right stands are identical except for their adjustment.

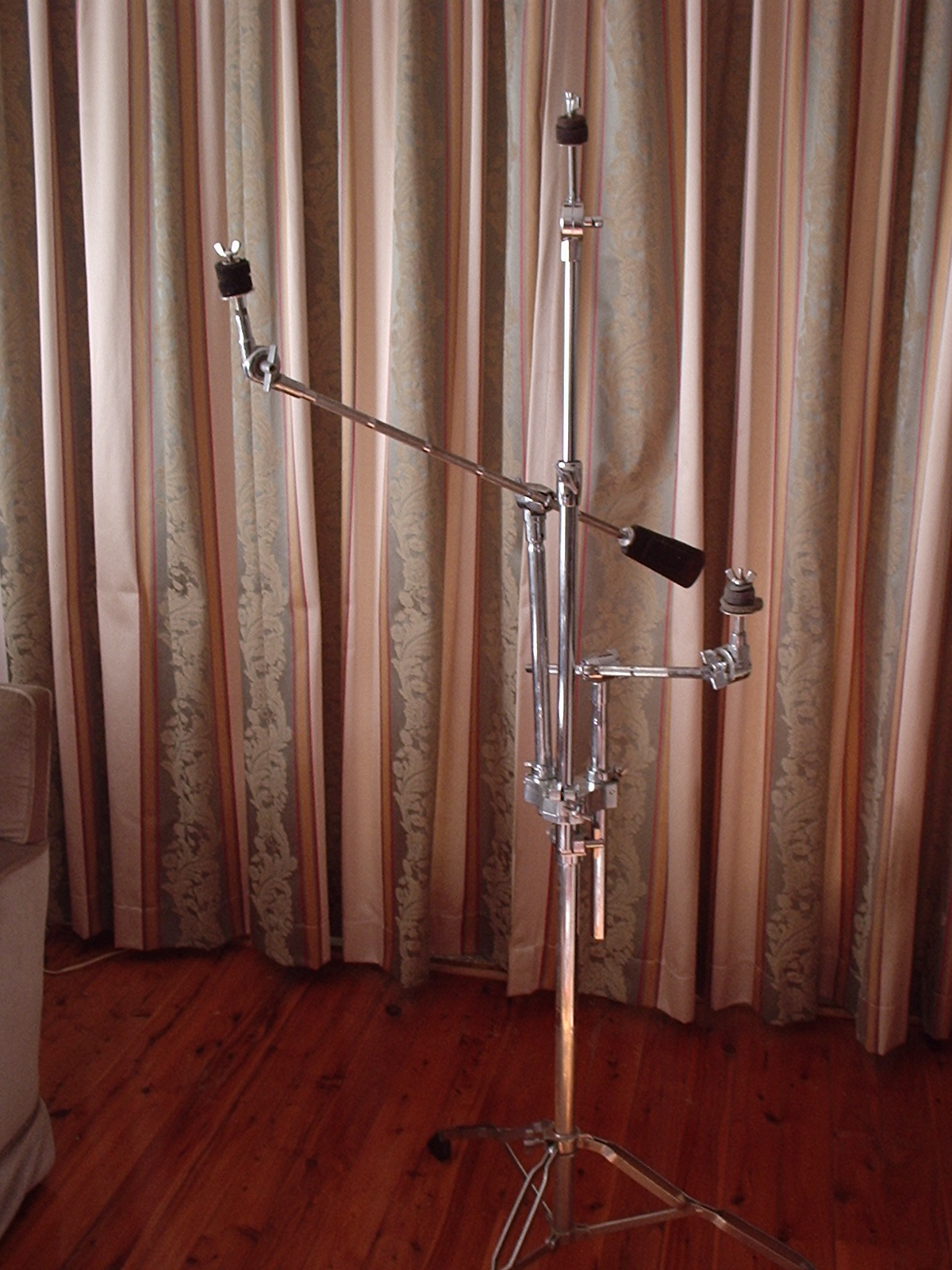
Triple cymbal stand using 20mm mounting

== Alternative cymbal mounting techniques ==
Other common ways of supporting a cymbal include:

- A bracket on a bass drum.
- Piggybacking on another cymbal.
- An auxiliary boom supported by another stand such as a tom-tom drum stand.
- A drum rack.
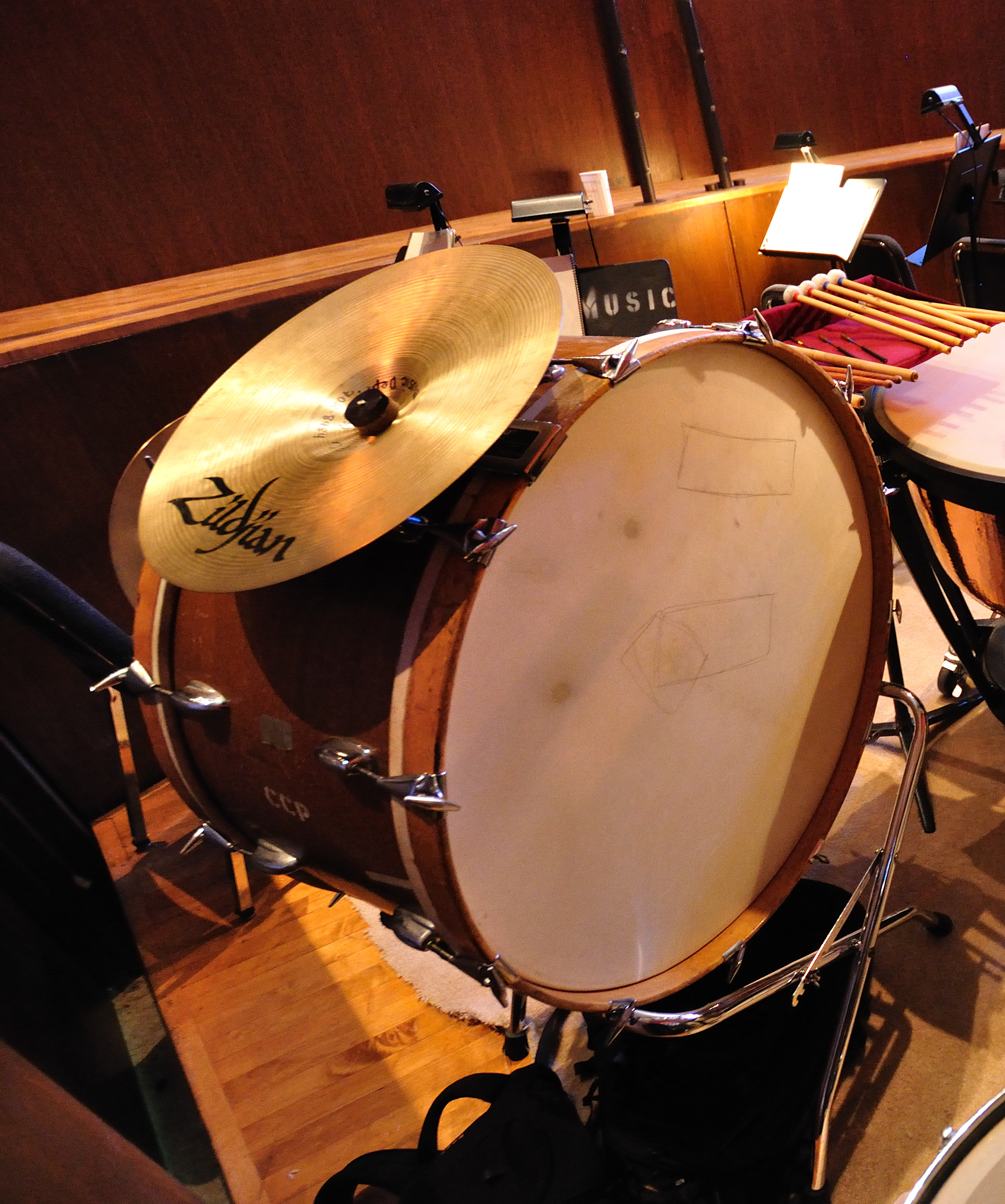
A cymbal mounted on an orchestral bass drum

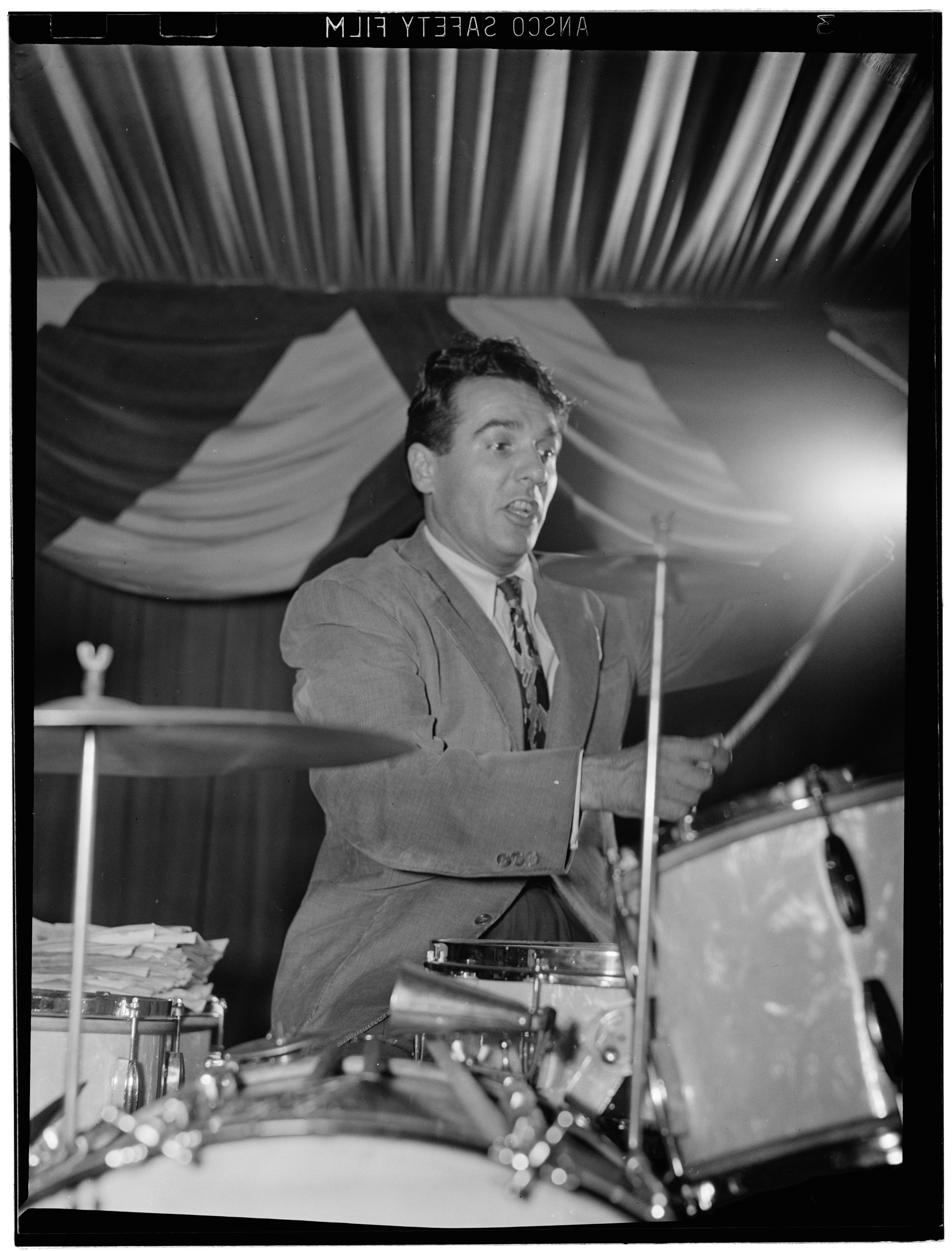
Gene Krupa with two cymbals mounted on a bass drum

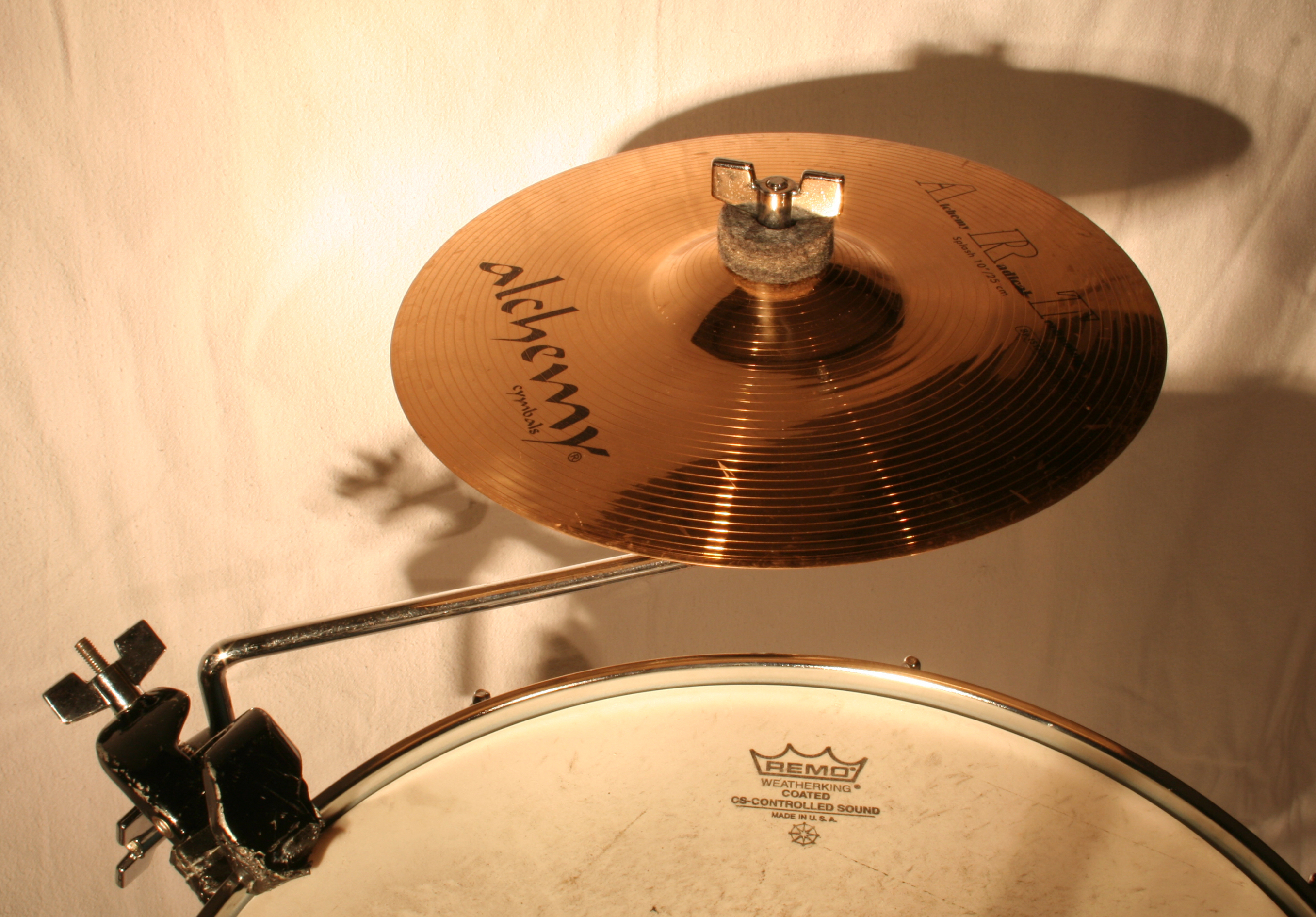
A cymbal mounted on a snare drum rim

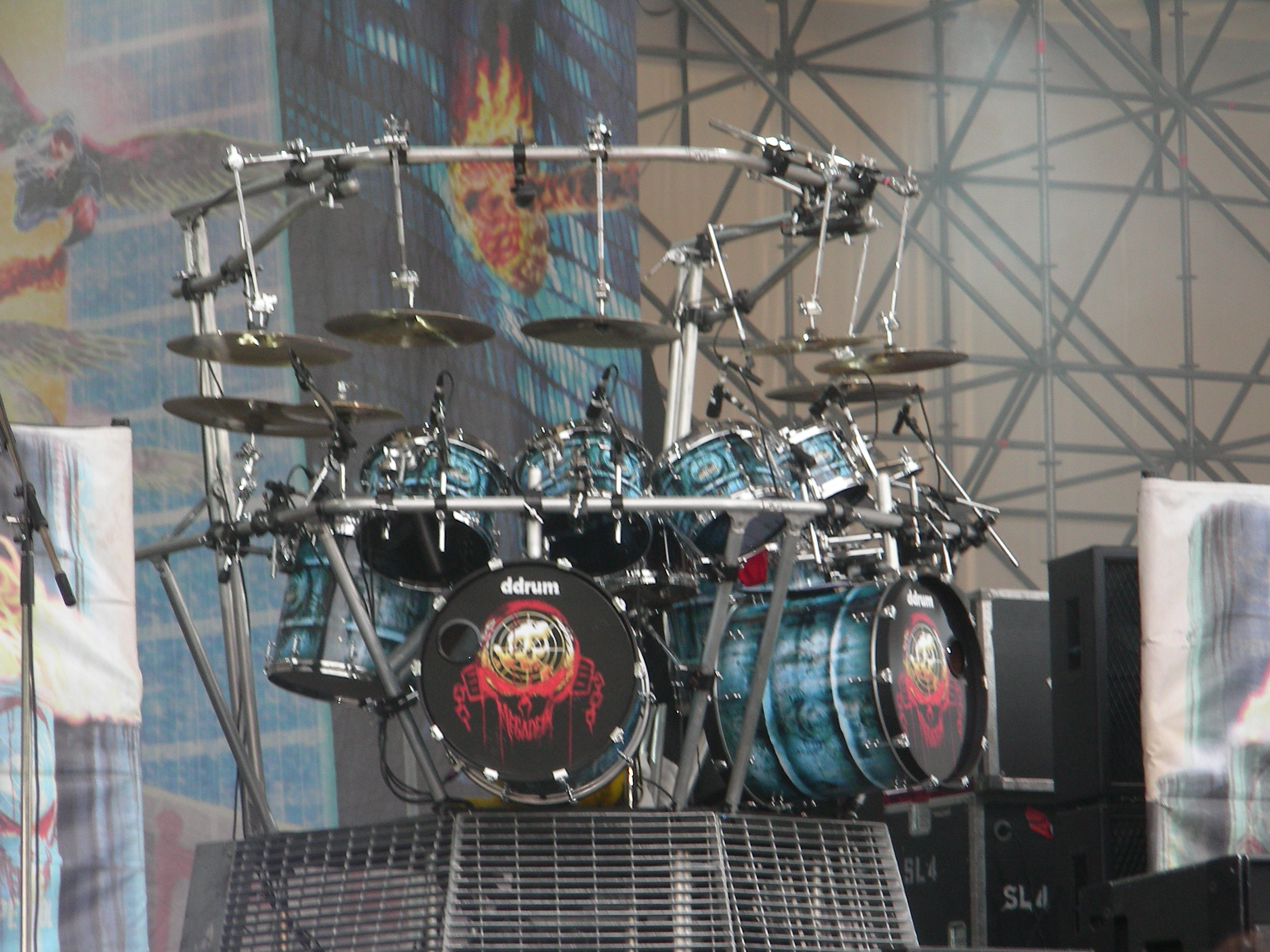
Cymbals mounted on a drum rack

== See also ==
General:

- Drum hardware.

For more details and photographs of other cymbal mounting methods:

- Splash cymbal#Mounting.
- Suspended cymbal.
