= Drum case =

Cases used to transport percussion equipment

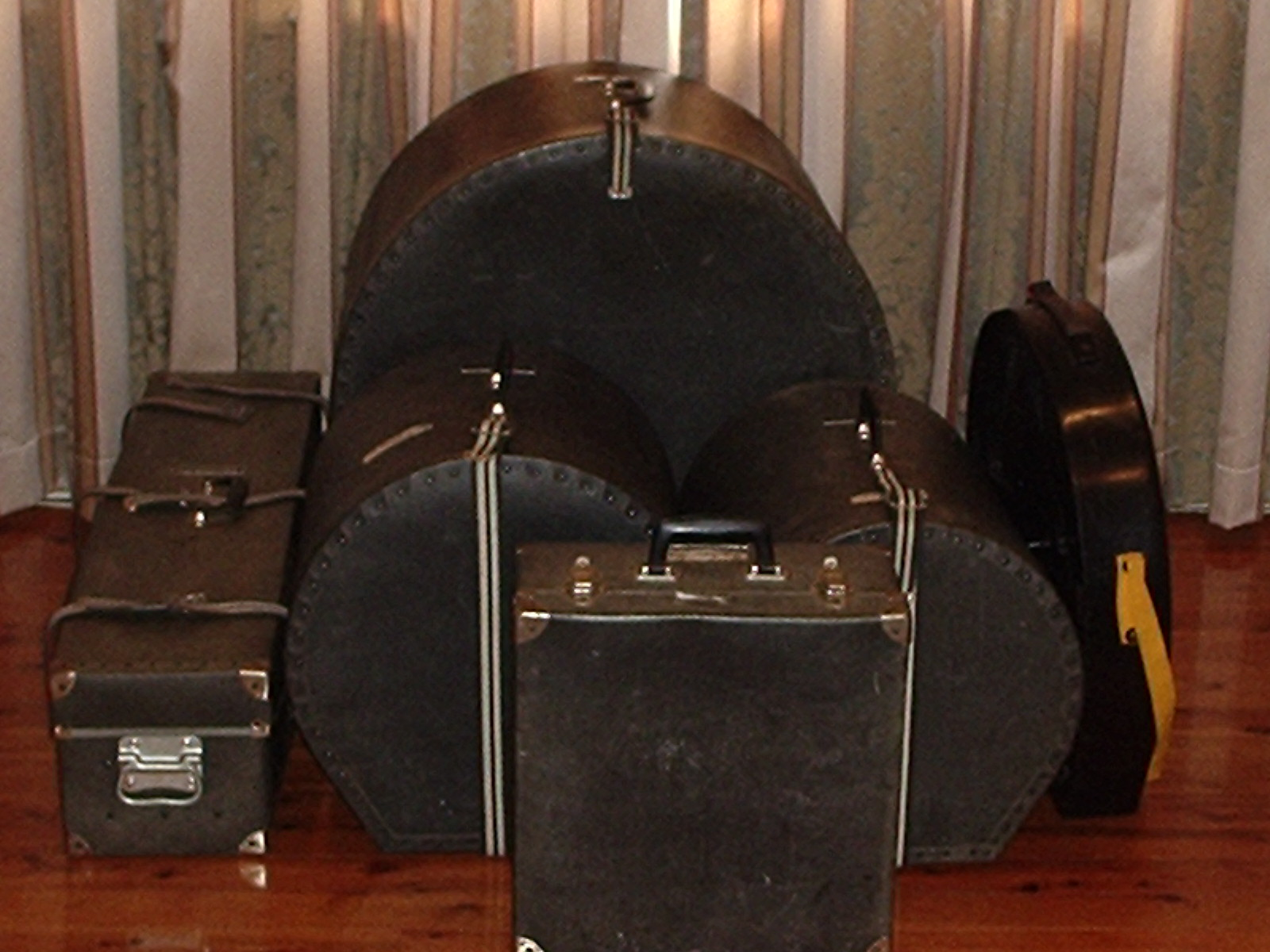
A five-piece drum kit in hard drum cases

A drum case is a piece of luggage used by drummers and percussionists to transport their instruments, hardware, and accessories. Hard drum cases may be made of vulcanized fiber, molded plastic, or plywood, while soft drum cases may be made of nylon, cordura, or polyester. Generally, hard cases are lined inside with fleece or foam lining and offer better protection than soft cases.

A set of cases for transporting a drum kit will typically consist of one case for the bass drum, one for the snare drum, one for each of the toms, a case or bag for the cymbals, and one trap case to transport the remainder of the kit, including the stands, floor tom feet, and bass drum pedal.

The sticks or mallets are usually carried in a separate stick or mallet bag.

== See also ==
- Road case
