= Drum hardware =

Parts of a drum kit

Drum hardware is the set of parts of a drum or drum kit that are used to tension, position, and otherwise support the instruments themselves.

Occasionally, the hardware is used percussively as well, the most common example being a rim shot.

== Drum parts ==
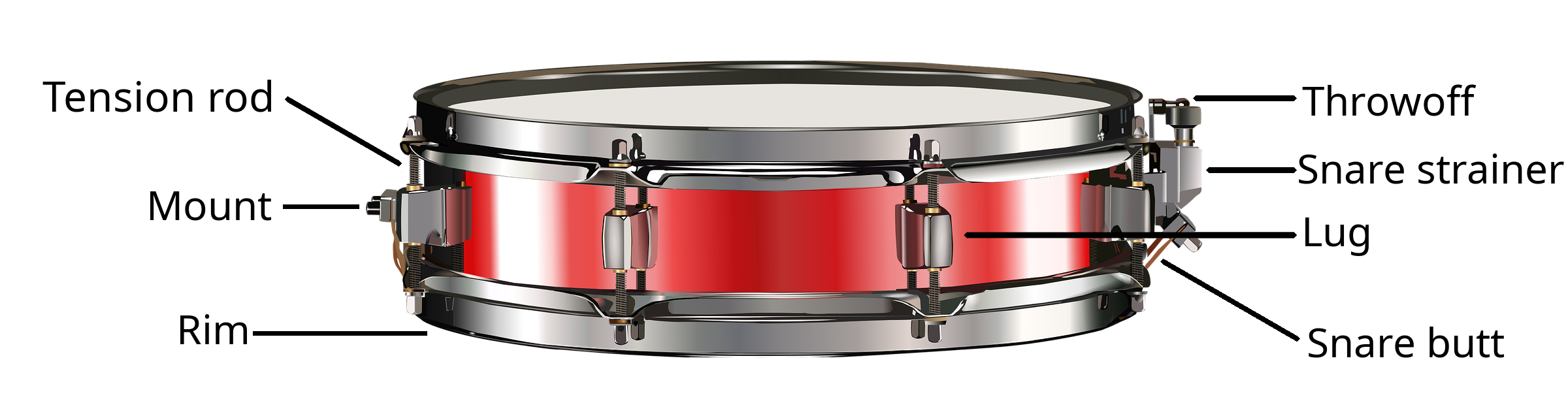
Hardware of a typical snare drum
Common drum mounts

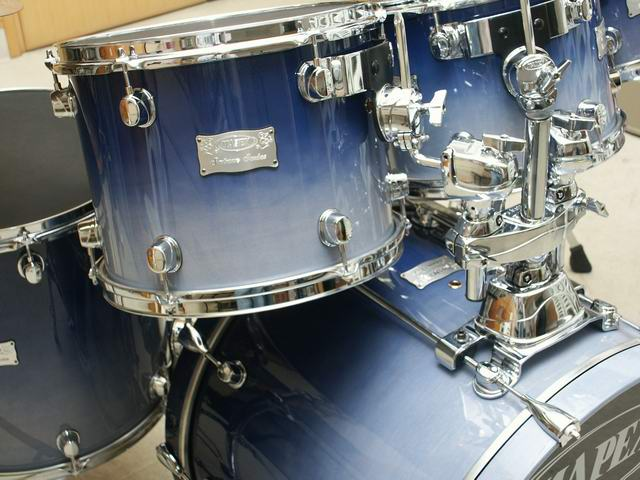
Isolated mounting system for two tom-toms

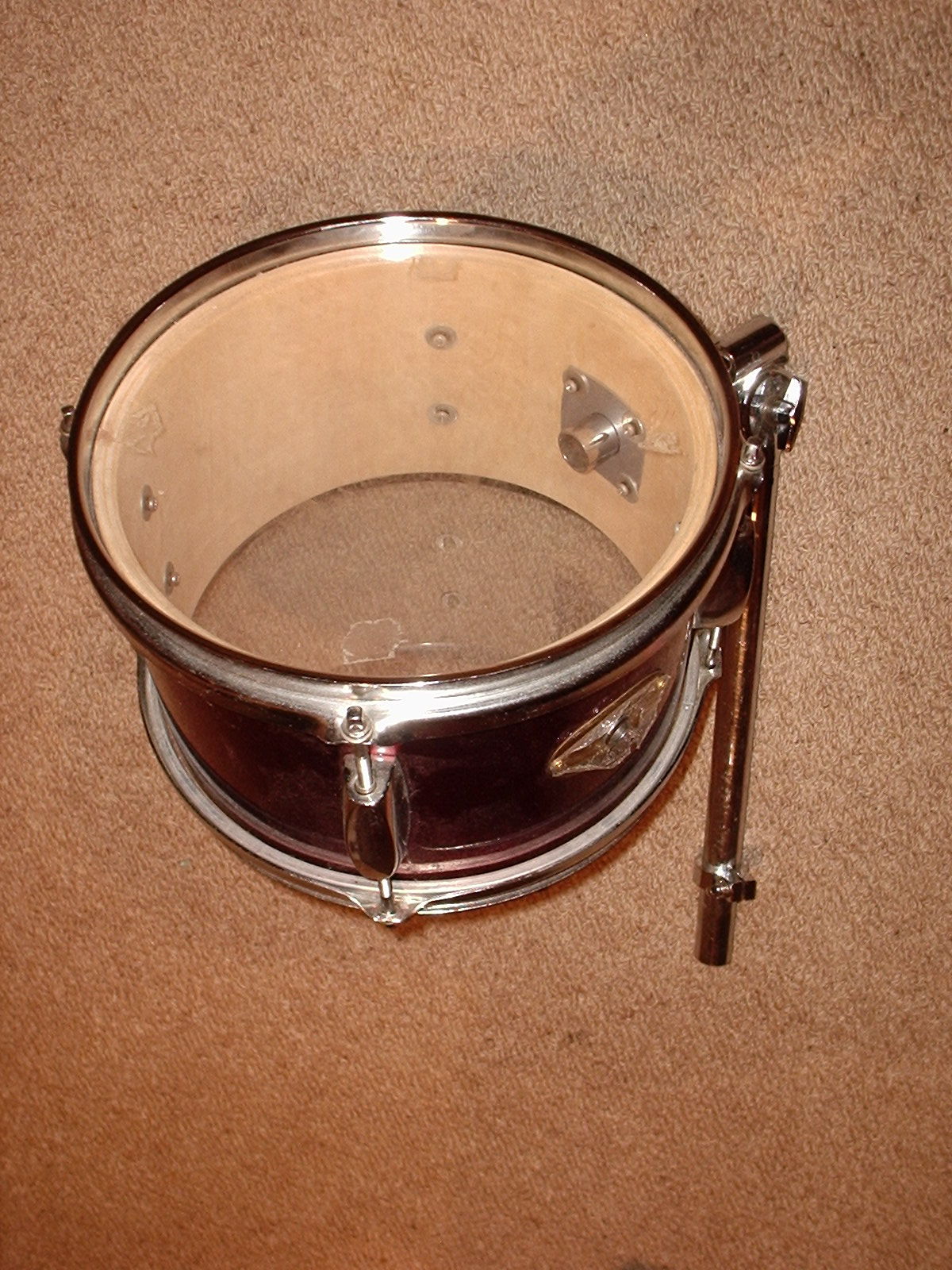
Tom on 7/8" arm, showing the tube intruding into the shell

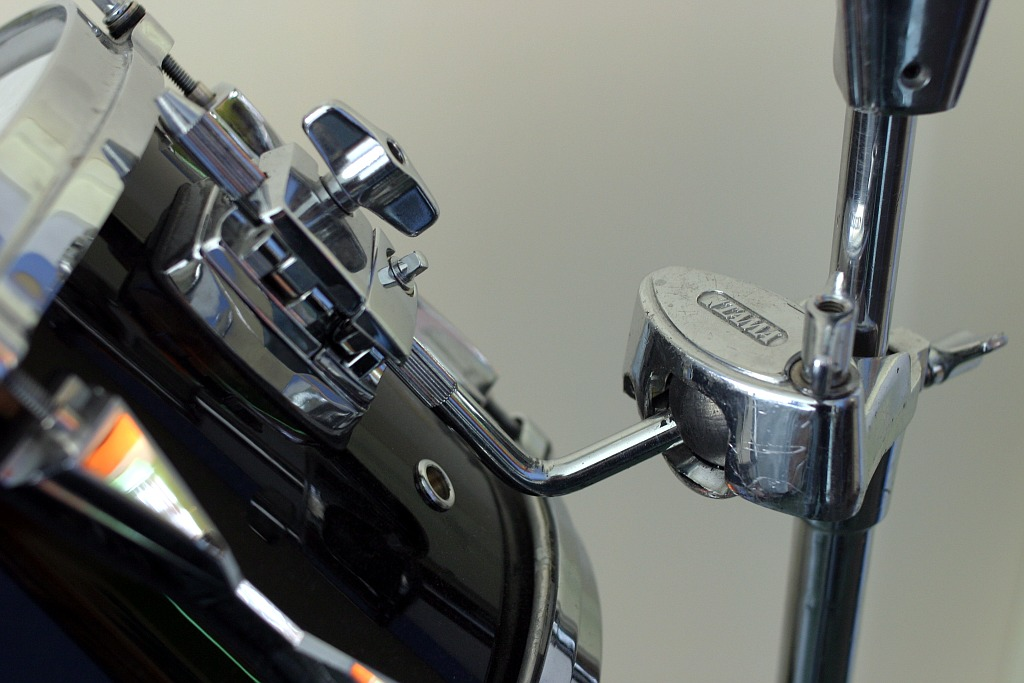
Parallel mount on a tom

=== Rim ===
A drum "hoop" or "rim" may be made of metal, wood, or other materials and is used to hold a drumhead against a drum shell, either with bolts through metal "claws" attached directly to a hoop, or bolts through holes in a flanged or die-cast rim. The bolts, called tension rods, are screwed into threaded "lugs" attached to the drum shell, in order to tighten and tune the drumhead. A drum key is a type of wrench often used to screw the tension rods into the lugs.

=== Spurs/bass drum legs, casings/lugs, and tension rods/tuning screws ===
There are a number of components that make up a drum's anatomy. Some of these anatomical components vary dependent upon the type of drum, the manufacturer, and the year in which it was made. However, nearly all modern drums have the same essential components. Kick drums often have legs called spurs on either side of the drum shell. These spurs are used to prevent the kick drum from rolling side to side, to prevent the drum from sliding forward as it is being played and to provide overall added stability to the drum. Casings, also known as lugs, vary in shape and size. They all serve the same purpose as the receiving end of the drum tension rod (also known as a tuning screw) and provide the anchor point for the tension rods themselves. Casings are found on nearly all modern drums. The number of casings a drum has can vary from drum to drum and manufacturer to manufacturer. A drum can have as few as six casings and as many as twelve. Tension rods, also known as tuning screws, are threaded bolts that are placed around the rim of a drum and screw into the casings. They enable the musician to adjust the tension of the drum's head and affect its overall pitch, tone, and timbre. They come in many lengths and should also always have a tension rod washer that is often made of metal or hard plastic.

=== Snare tensioner ===
Snare drums will often have a "strainer" on one side and a "butt plate" on the other to hold the snare wires to the drumhead. Snare tension is controlled with a screw on the strainer. A strainer may also have a "throwoff" lever to move snares away from the drumhead, in order to prevent buzzing caused by other bass instruments while the snare is not in use, or to produce a tom-tom sound if desired.

=== Badge ===
While not required for operation, most drum manufacturers label their products by way of a drum "badge". The badge is a label attached to the drum shell with a grommet, which is embossed with the manufacturer's name or logo, and often a serial number as well. The grommet doubles as a "vent" hole for two-sided drums.

=== Mounts ===
Drum mounts are fittings, normally attached to the drum shell, that enable a drum to be attached to a supporting bracket, stand or rack. Traditionally, smaller tom-tom drums are supported by mounts and known as hanging toms, while snare drums rest on a stand not attached to the drum, and floor toms and bass drums rest on their own legs.

Hanging tom mounts are of two main patterns:

- The Pearl 7/8" (22 mm) mount accepts a 22 mm steel tube perpendicular to the drum shell. The excess length of the tube intrudes through the drum shell, and a large hole is required for this. Developed by Pearl, this mount has been adopted by many other manufacturers, and the 22 mm tube has become a standard interface for many other mounts and stands, such as cymbal booms.
- The parallel mount accepts a solid bar parallel to the drum shell. There are many bar sizes and profiles, mostly either round and knurled or hexagonal. There is some compatibility, but it is not universal. Some manufacturers such as Tama Drums and Gibraltar Hardware even produce a single fitting that can be used either singly as a hanging tom mount, or in sets of three to attach the floor tom legs.

Either of these patterns can also be used with a rim mount. Most fittings have provision for memory to reduce setup time.

There are many other patterns, including:

- Similar mounts to the 7/8" but with smaller tube. Mostly used on toy and entry level kits
- Spade mounts on older kits and, traditionally, on timbales
- Mounts that accept a solid bar similar to the parallel mount, but perpendicular to the drum shell or at an angle close to this. Common on older kits, and on some high-level handmade kits from smaller makers.

== Stands and holders ==
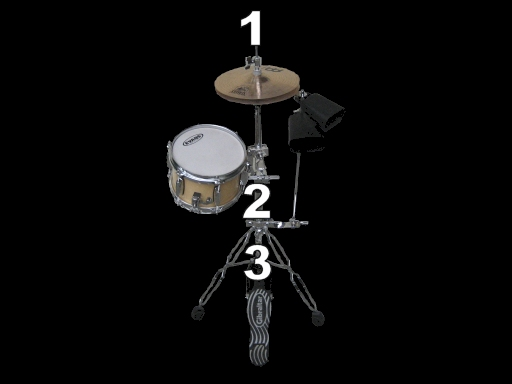
1 Hi-hat rod and clutch
2 Tom and cowbell clamp holders
3 HiHat legs and pedal

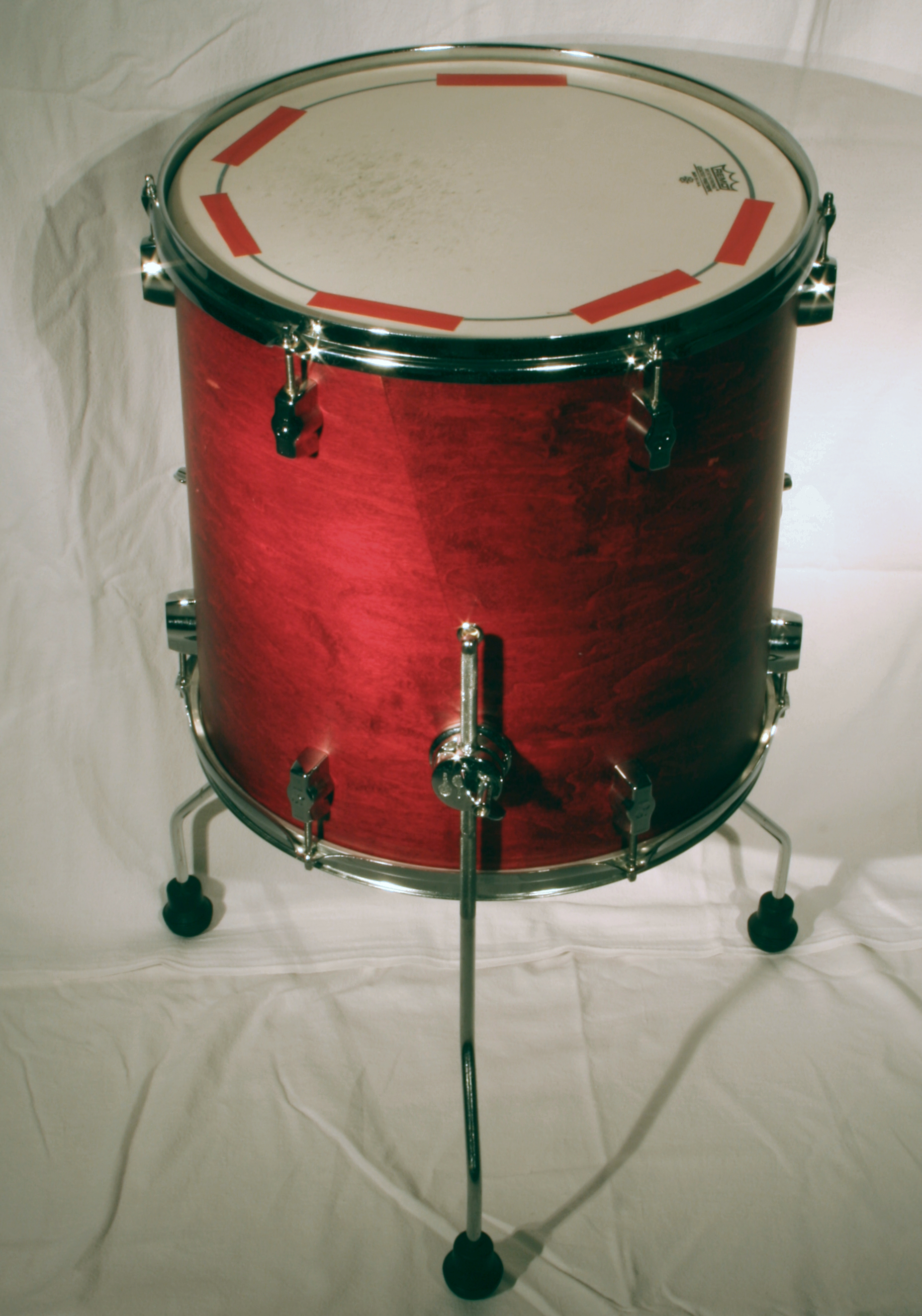
Floor tom with traditional legs

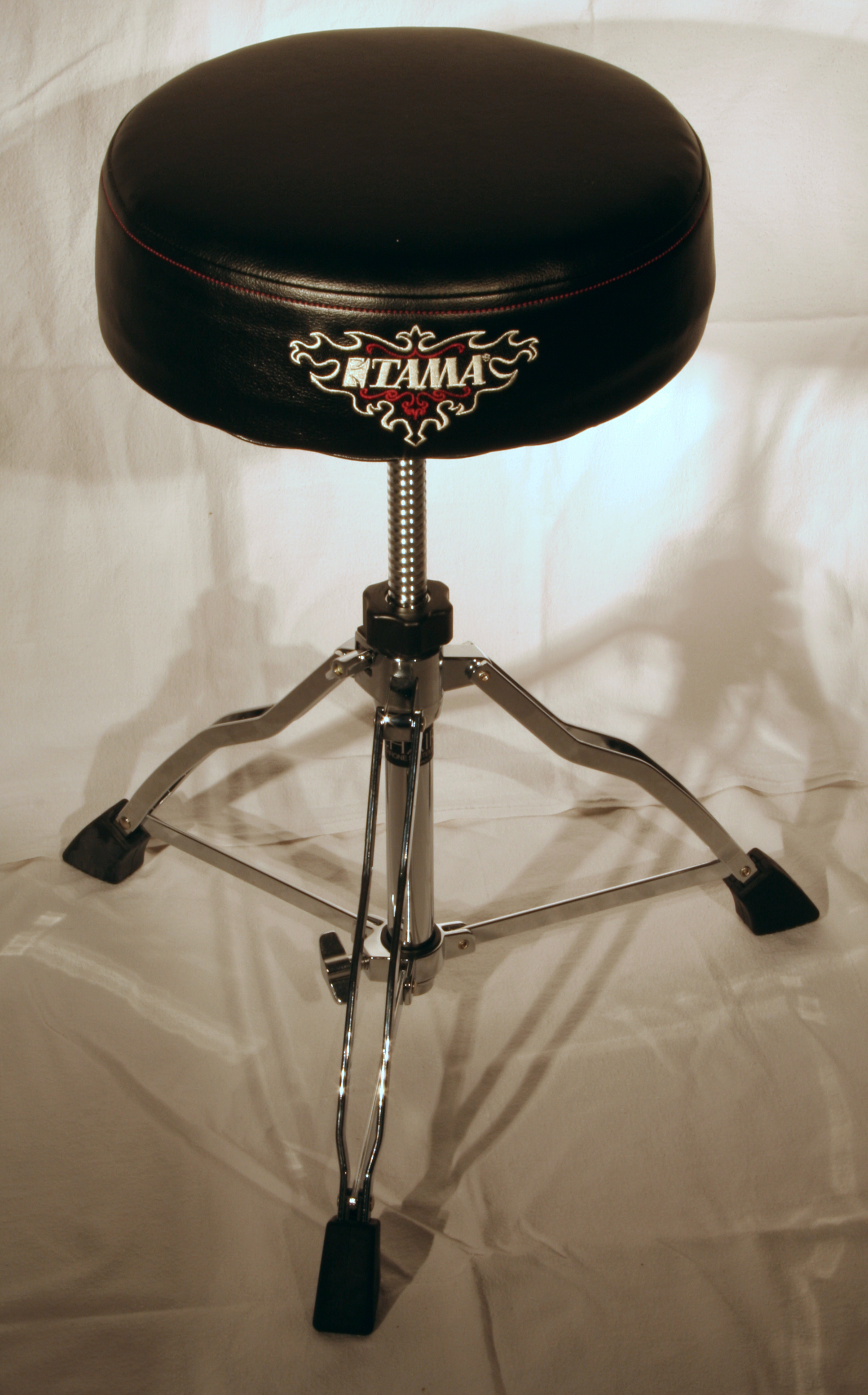
Drummer's stool

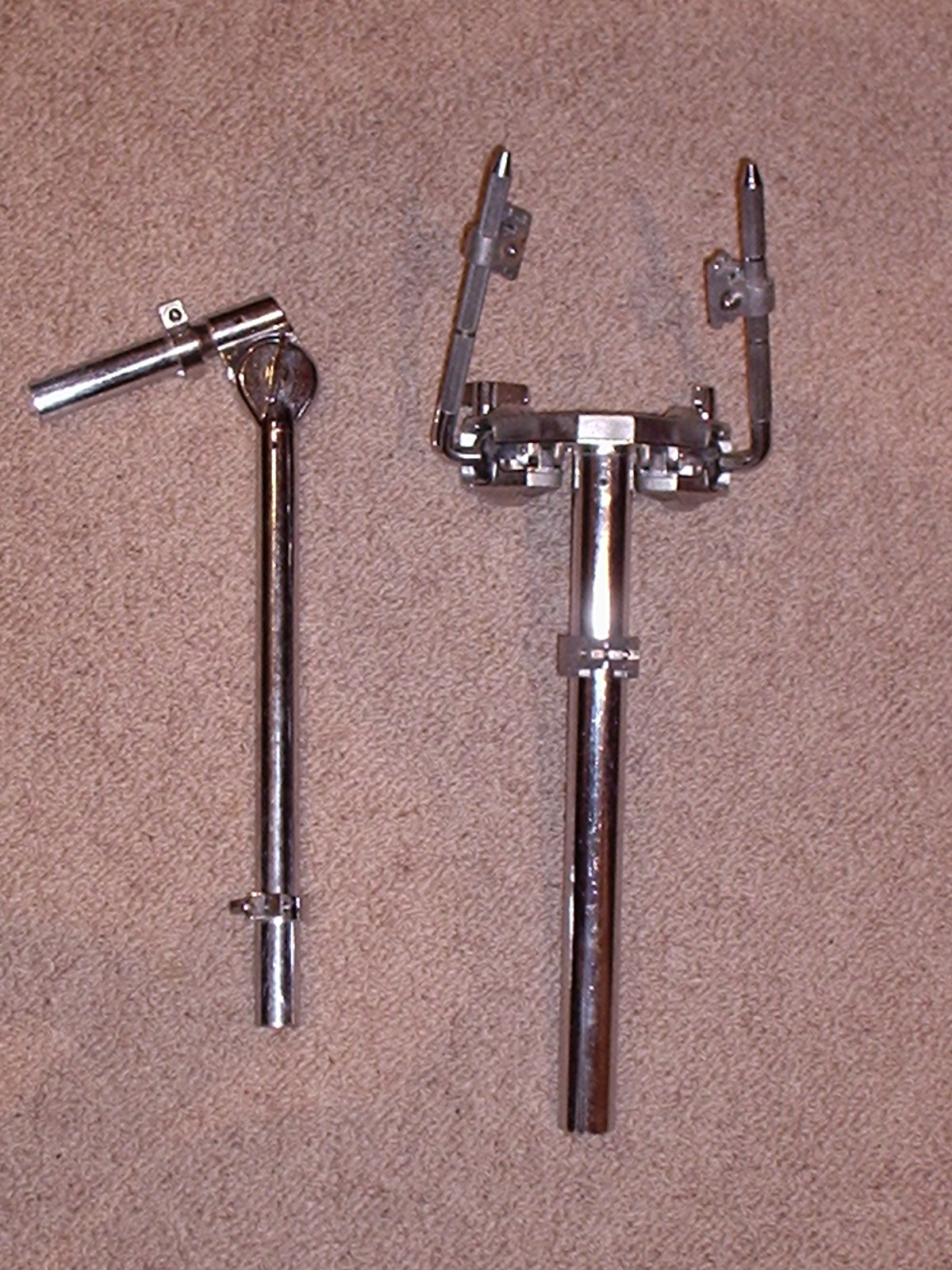
Tom arms with memory: a standard 7/8" arm (left) and a Tama twin speedball bracket (right)

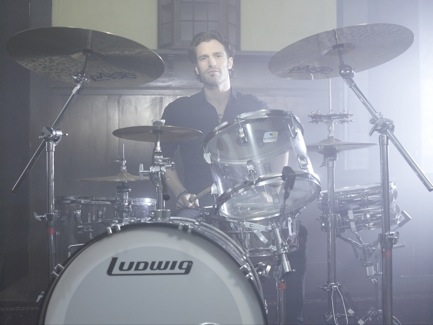
Ryan Hoyle using a modern snare drum stand to support a hanging tom

Metal stands and holders are used to support percussion instruments or microphones. Floor stands are often tripods and telescoping.

Tom-tom and cymbal stands may have a "boom arm" attached to extend holder reach, and a "tilter" to move instruments into a desired position. Smaller "clamp holders" may also be used to attach more instruments to existing stands. Drum "racks" are stands surrounding a drum kit onto which percussion instrument holders may be clamped. "Memory locks" are clamps used to make drum and telescoping positions permanent.

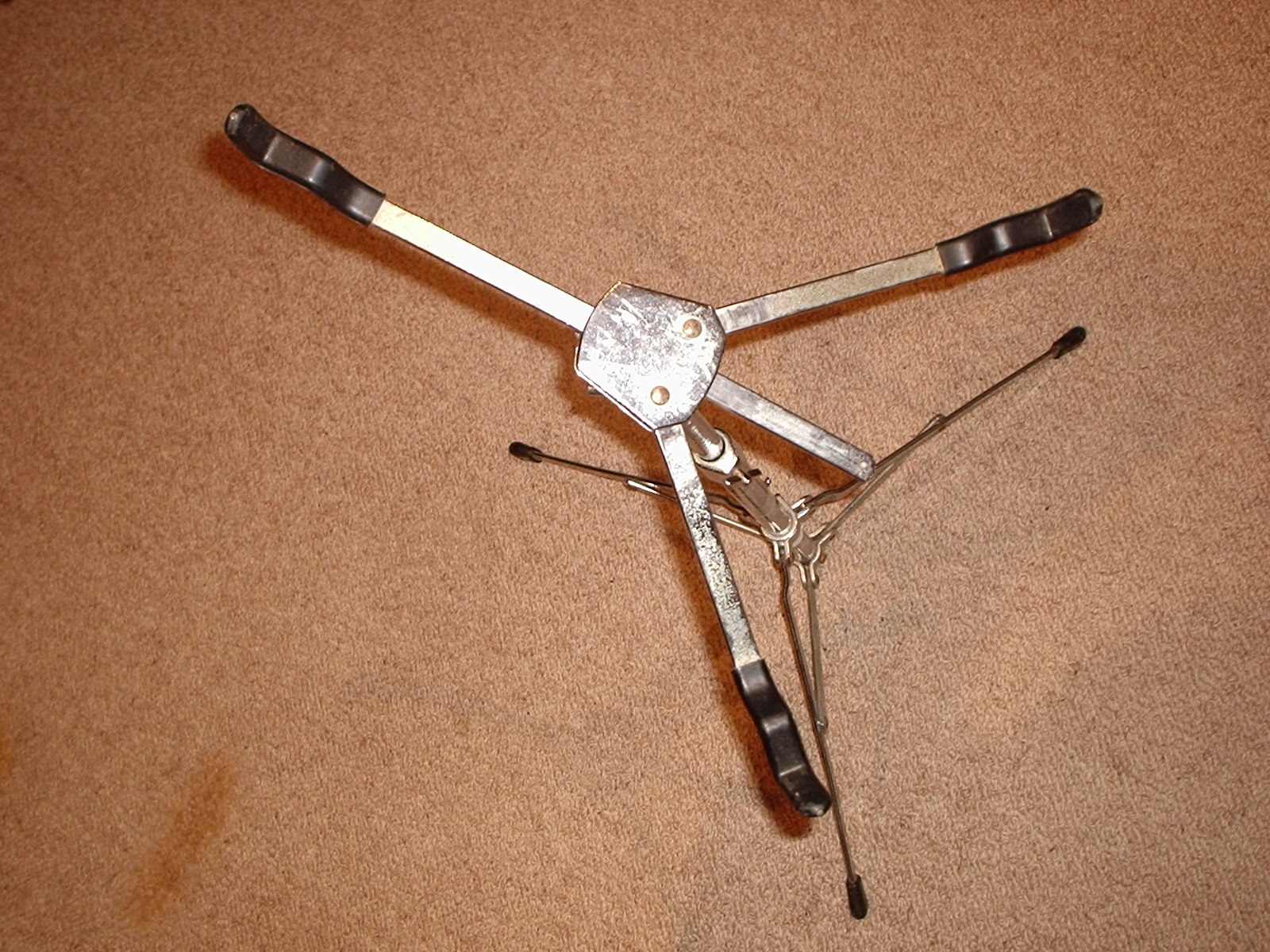
A traditional snare drum stand

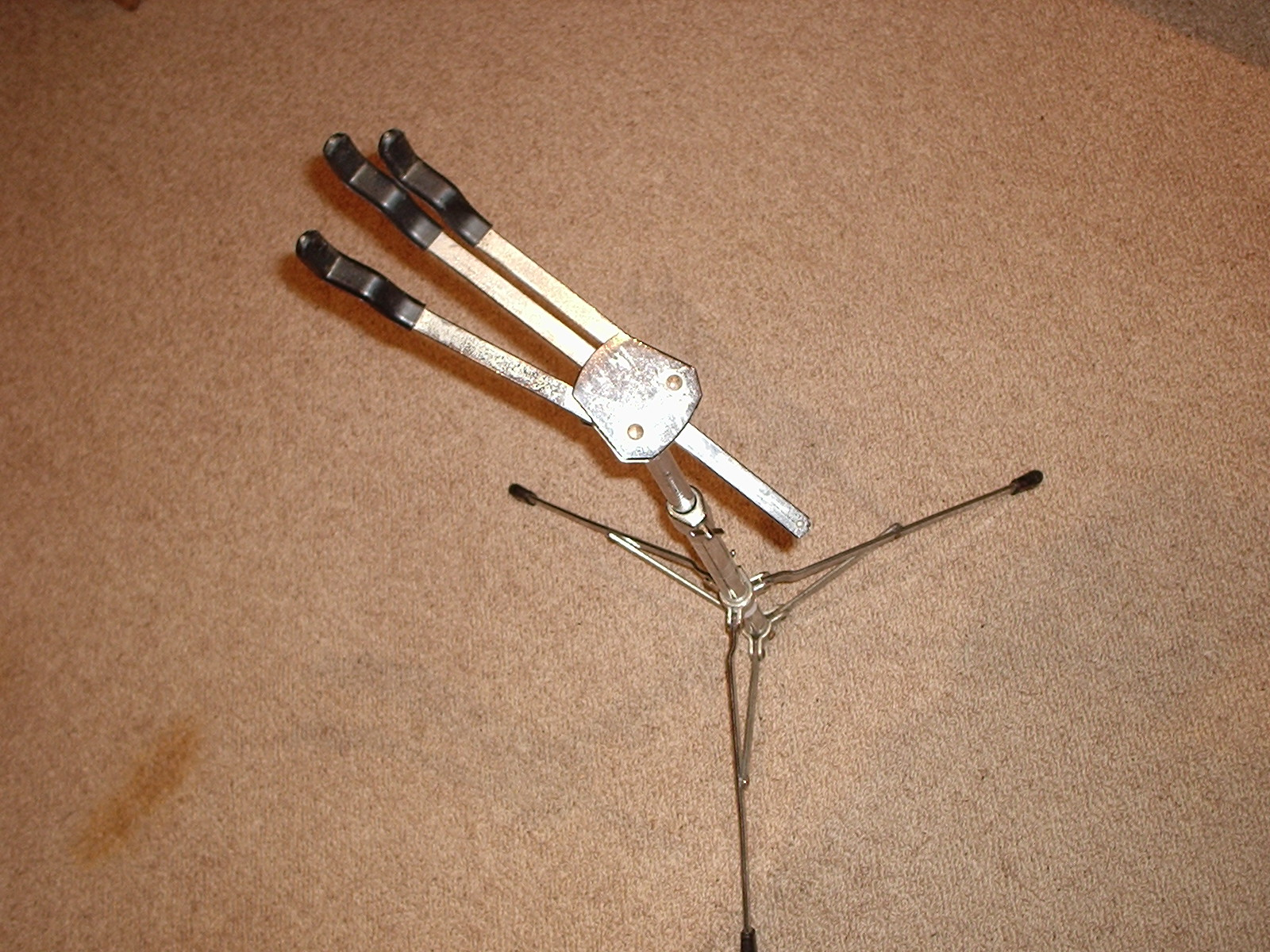
Traditional stand partly folded

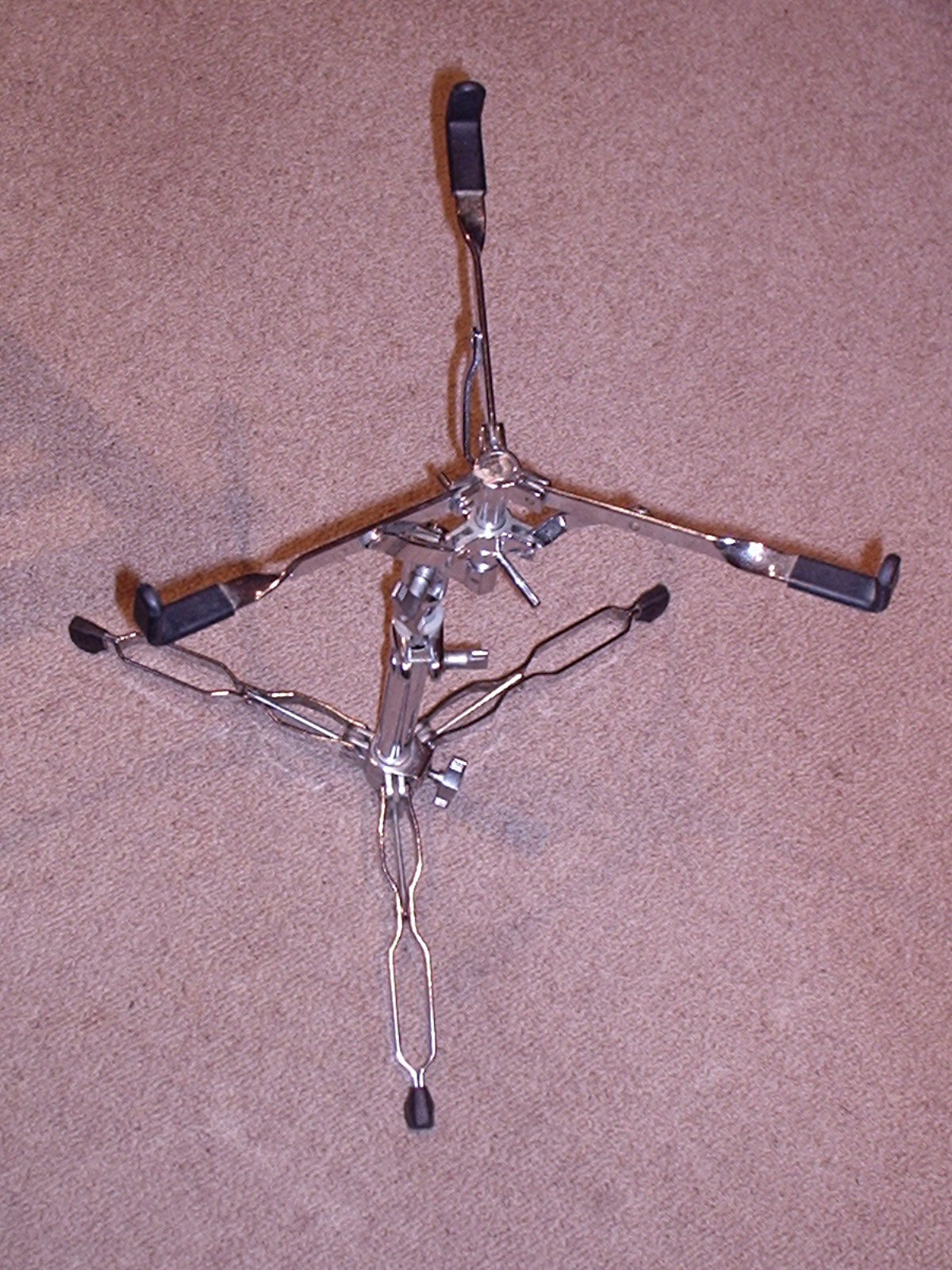
A modern stand

=== Snare drum stand ===
Snare drum stands have three arms as a "basket" to cradle the lower rim of the drum. There are several patterns.

The older, traditional pattern has two arms that pivot, and one that slides to accommodate varying sizes of drum. This is satisfactory for a tilted drum; The drum is tilted away from the sliding arm and rests on the two pivoting arms. If it is horizontal, or tilted the wrong way by inexpert players, then the drum is insecure.

The newer patterns use a symmetrical basket with a central screw adjustment, allowing the basket to be tightened onto the lower rim and the drum to be firmly held at any angle. They differ mainly in sturdiness and in the precise mechanism used for the screw adjustment.

Snare drum stands have long been used by some drummers to support tom-toms. In this application they offer much the same advantages as the more recently available rim mounts.

=== Rack toms ===
7/8" tom mounts
(single and double)
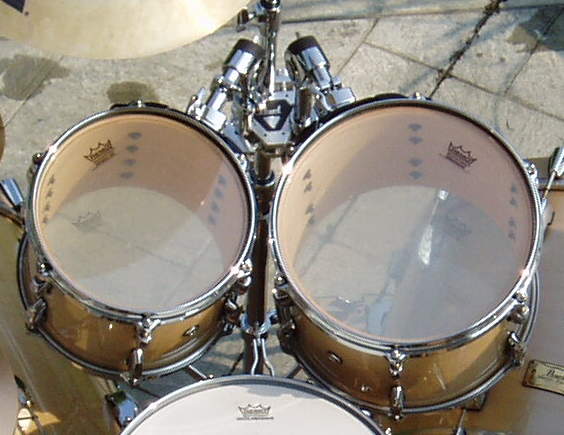
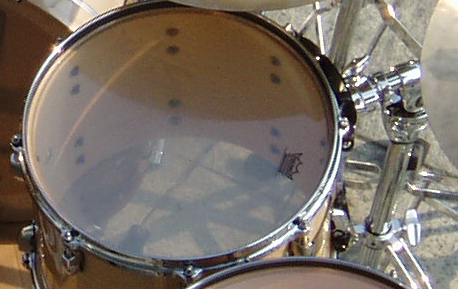

Hanging toms are traditionally supported by tom-tom arms or brackets mounted on the bass drum, with one or two toms supported by each bass drum.

Extra toms may be supported by stands or racks.

=== Floor tom ===
Floor toms are traditionally supported by three feet resting on the floor, as the name suggests. More recently, some drummers have used rim mounts.

=== Cymbal stands ===
Cymbal stands have a threaded bolt or "cymbal post" to hold a cymbal down with a nut. Accessory booms and piggyback adaptors allow additional cymbals to be added to an existing stand (not to be confused with stacking).

=== Hi-hat stand ===
A hi-hat stand is a standard part of the hardware of a drum kit. In an extended kit, additional pairs of hi-hat cymbals may be operated remotely by a cable hat, or held closed by an X-hat adaptor.

=== Drum Stool ===
The drum stool is a three or four-legged padded seat or stool the drummer sits on while playing. The stool may be shaped like round cushions or in a saddle design. Stool heights may be adjusted to accommodate the drummer.

=== Memory ===
Many drum stands and brackets have provision for memory. This consists of a mechanical device, such as a collar, that allows quick reassembly in a preset position after the kit has been disassembled.

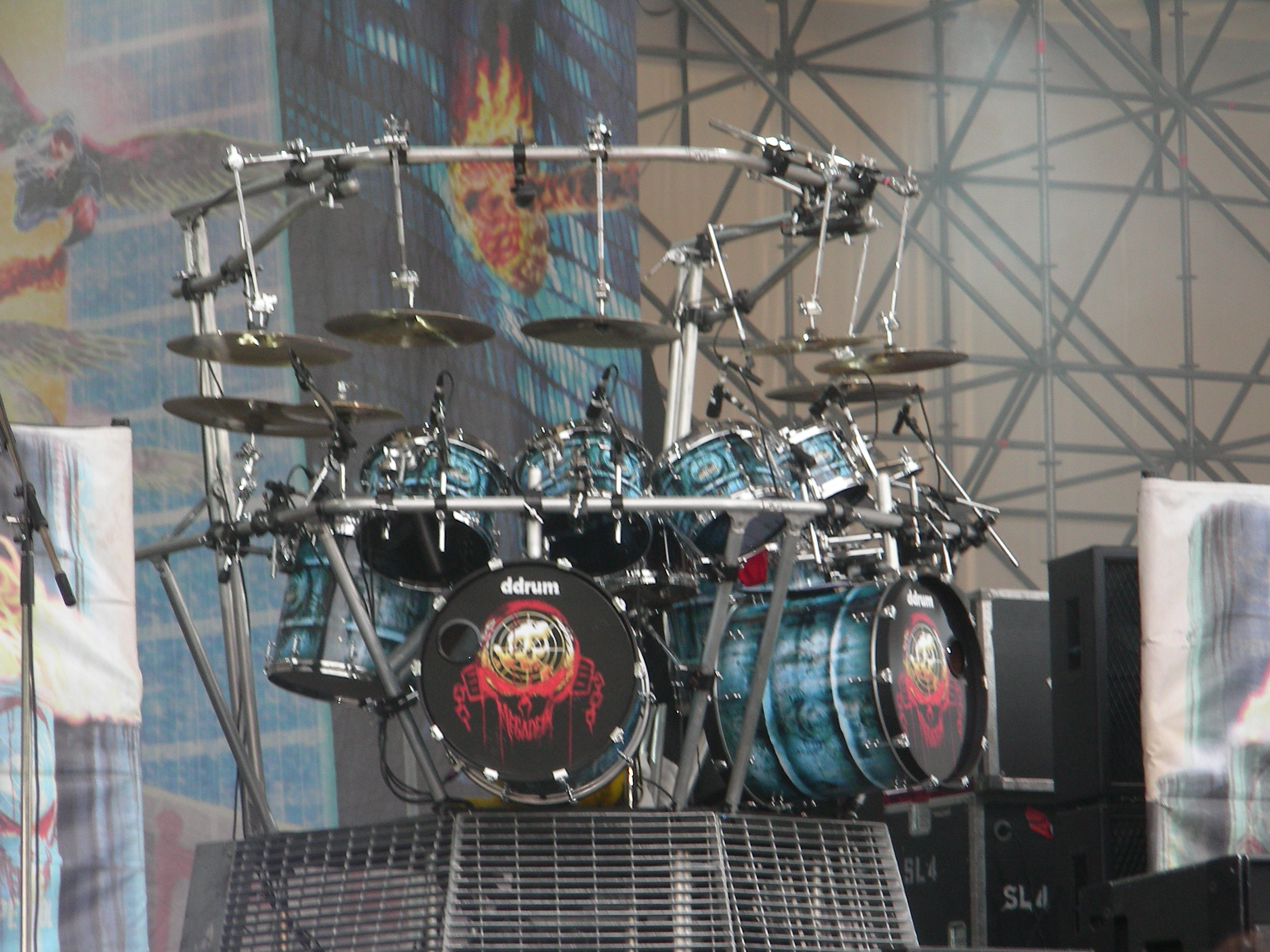
Cymbals, hanging toms, a floor tom and even the bass drums are supported by this drum rack

=== Drum rack ===
Some or all of the stands can be replaced by a drum rack. Racks are particularly used for larger kits, but can greatly reduce the weight and setup time of even moderately sized kits.

Cymbals and hanging toms are most often mounted on the rack, but bass drums, floor toms and even snare drums can be rack mounted, particularly if rim mounts are used.

== See also ==
- Drum hardware pack
- Drum key
- Drum kit
- Traps case

=== Hardware components ===
- Drum pedal (disambiguation)
- Tom-tom drum § Hardware
- Rim mount
- Cymbal stand
- Splash cymbal § Mounting
- Hi-hat § Modern stands
