= Drum kit =

Musical instrument consisting of a collection of percussion instruments

Standard drum kit configuration: (Note: Additional accessories, such as cowbells or various idiophones, can be incorporated to modify the timbre and enrich the overall sound texture. There are also add-ons that alter the drum tones, adding either bright, high-pitched nuances or deep, muted ones.)
1. Bass drum
2. Floor tom
3. Snare drum
4. Rack tom
5. Hi-hat
6. Crash cymbal
7. Ride cymbal
8. Splash cymbal
9. China cymbal

Percussion instrument
- Other names: Acoustic drum kit, drum set, trap set, drums
- Classification: Percussion
- Hornbostel–Sachs classification: 211.212.11 and 111.24 (Individual double-skin cylindrical drums, one skin used for playing and percussion vessels)
- Developed: 1860s, United States

Related instruments
- Drum, bongos, rototoms, octoban, crash/ride cymbal, sizzle cymbal, bell cymbal, swish cymbal, zinger cymbal, cowbell, jam block, vibraslap, temple blocks, tambourine, tam-tam, mark tree

Sound sample
- Drum kit sound: file; help

More articles or information
- Electronic drum, drum hardware, drum stick, drum case, trigger, drum module

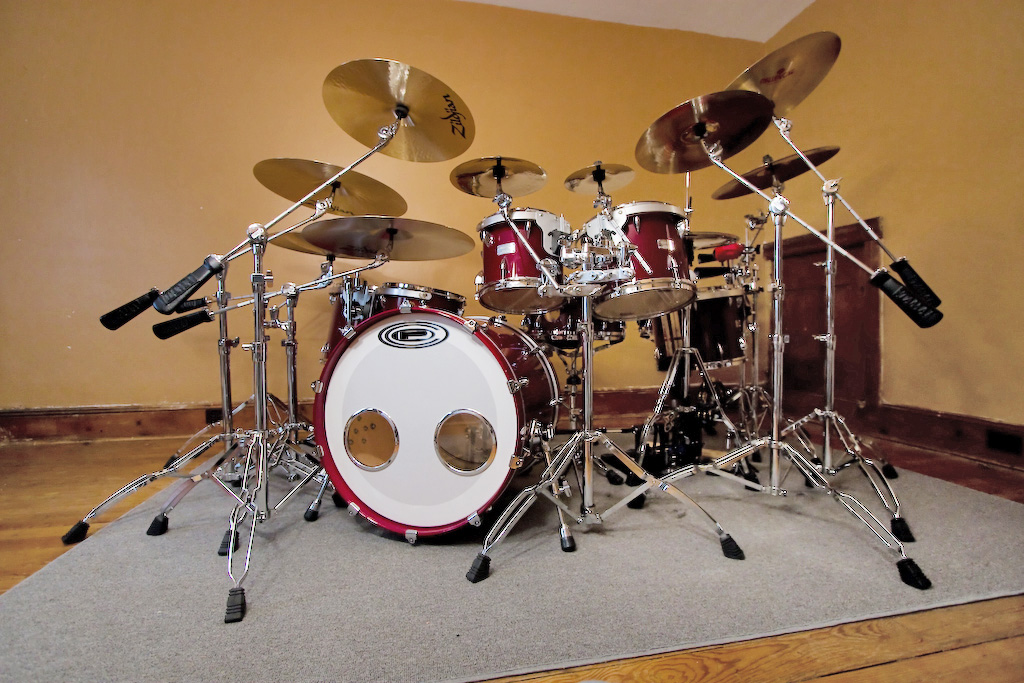
A drum kit with a multi-cymbal configuration.

A drum kit, acoustic drum kit, or drum set (Note: These two words may also be combined as "drumset".) (also known as a trap set or simply drums in popular music and jazz contexts) is a musical instrument consisting of a collection of percussion instruments arranged to be played by a single musician. It typically includes drums, cymbals, and sometimes other auxiliary percussion instruments, such as a tambourine or a cowbell. The drummer usually plays while seated on a drum throne, using drumsticks or special wire or nylon brushes to strike the drums and cymbals, as well as pedals to operate the bass drum and hi-hat, allowing them to adapt the sound to their desired effect.

The drum set is not standardized, but usually consists of:

- A snare drum, mounted on a stand
- A bass drum, played with a beater moved by one or more foot-operated pedals
- Two or more tom-toms, including rack toms or floor toms
- One or more cymbals, including a ride cymbal and crash cymbal
- Hi-hat cymbals, a pair of cymbals that can be played with a foot-operated pedal as well as the hands

Drum sets may be smaller consisting of only snare drum, bass drum, hi-hat, and one cymbal. Conversely, they can also be quite expansive. The drum kit is a part of the standard rhythm section and is used in many types of popular and traditional music styles, ranging from rock and pop to blues and jazz.

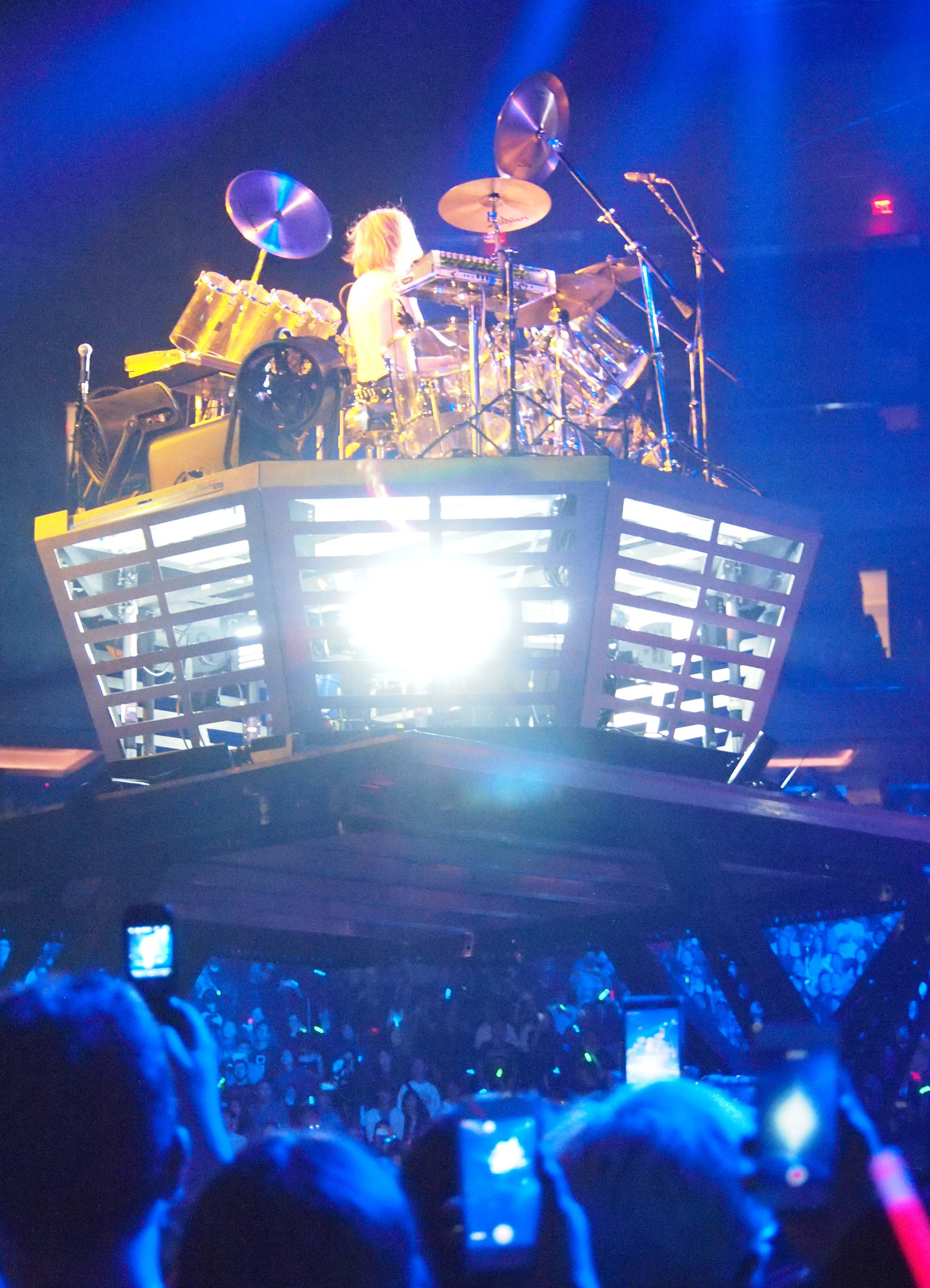
Japanese Visual Kei drummer Yoshiki's drum riser at Madison Square Garden

== History ==
=== Early development ===
Before the development of the classic drum kit, drums and cymbals used in military and orchestral music settings were played separately by different percussionists. In the 1840s, percussionists began to experiment with foot pedals as a way to enable them to play more than one instrument, but these devices would not be mass-produced for another 75 years. By the 1860s, percussionists started combining multiple drums into a kit. The bass drum, snare drum, cymbals, and other percussion instruments were all struck with hand-held drumsticks. Drummers in musical theater appeared in stage shows, where the budget for pit orchestras was often limited due to an insufficient amount of money able to employ a full percussionist team. This contributed to the creation of the drum kit by developing techniques and devices that would enable one person to replace multiple percussionists.

Double-drumming was developed to enable one person to play both bass and snare drums with sticks, while the cymbals could be played by tapping the foot on a "low-boy". With this approach, the bass drum was usually played on beats one and three (in 4/4 time). While the music was first designed to accompany marching soldiers, this simple and straightforward drumming approach led to the birth of ragtime music, when the simple marching beats became more syncopated. This resulted in a greater swing and dance feel. The drum kit was initially referred to as a "trap set", and from the late 1800s to the 1930s, drummers were referred to as "trap drummers". By the 1870s, drummers were using an overhang pedal. Most drummers in the 1870s preferred to do double-drumming without any pedal to play multiple drums, rather than use an overhang pedal. Companies patented their pedal systems, such as that of drummer Edward "Dee Dee" Chandler of New Orleans in 1904 or 1905. This led to the bass drum being played by percussionists standing and using their feet, hence the term "kick drum".

William F. Ludwig Sr. and his brother Theobald founded Ludwig & Ludwig Co. in 1909 and patented the first commercially successful bass drum pedal system.

In 1912, drummers replaced sticks with wire brushes and, later, metal fly swatters as the louder sounds made by using drumsticks could overpower other instruments.

=== 20th century ===
By World War I, drum kits were often marching-band-style bass drums with many percussion items around them and suspended from them. Drum kits became a central part of jazz, especially Dixieland. The modern drum kit was developed in the vaudeville era, during the 1920s, in New Orleans.

Drummers such as Baby Dodds, Zutty Singleton, and Ray Bauduc took the idea of marching rhythms and combined the bass drum, snare drum, and "traps" – a term used to refer to the percussion instruments associated with immigrant groups, which included miniature cymbals, tom toms, cowbells, and woodblocks. They started incorporating these elements into ragtime, which had been popular for a few decades, creating an approach that evolved into a jazz drumming style.

Budget constraints and space considerations in musical theater pit orchestras led bandleaders to pressure percussionists to cover more percussion parts. Metal consoles were developed to hold Chinese tom-toms, with swing-out stands for snare drums and cymbals. On top of the console was a "contraption" tray (shortened to "trap"), used to hold items like whistles, klaxons, and cowbells. These kits were dubbed "trap kits". Hi-hat stands became available around 1926.

In 1918, Baby Dodds, playing on Mississippi River riverboats with Louis Armstrong, modified the military marching setup, experimenting with playing the drum rims instead of woodblocks, hitting cymbals with sticks (which was not yet common), and adding a side cymbal above the bass drum, which became known as the ride cymbal. William Ludwig developed the "sock" or early low-mounted hi-hat after observing Dodds' drumming. Dodds asked Ludwig to raise the newly produced low-hat cymbal nine inches to make them easier to play, thus creating the modern hi-hat cymbal. Dodds was one of the first drummers to play the broken-triplet beat that became the standard rhythm of modern ride cymbal playing. He also popularized the use of Chinese cymbals. Recording technology was crude, which meant loud sounds could distort the recording. To get around this, Dodds used woodblocks and drum rims as quieter alternatives to cymbals and drum skins.

In the 1920s, freelance drummers were hired to play at shows, concerts, theaters, and clubs to support dancers and musicians of various genres. Orchestras were hired to accompany silent films, and the drummer was responsible for providing the sound effects. Sheet music from the 1920s shows that the drummer's sets were starting to evolve in size to support the various acts. However, by 1930, films with audio were more popular, and many were accompanied by pre-recorded soundtracks. This technological breakthrough put thousands of drummers who served as sound effects specialists out of work, with some drummers obtaining work as Foley artists for those motion-picture sound tracks.

== Playing ==
=== Grooves ===
Kit drumming, whether accompanying voices and other instruments or performing a drum solo, consists of two elements:

- A groove that sets the basic time-feel and provides a rhythmic framework for the song (examples include a backbeat or shuffle). Grooves can set the mood of the song.
- Drum fills and other ornaments and variations that provide variety and add interest to the drum sound. Fills could include a sting at the end of a musical section or act as a drum showpiece.

=== Fills ===
A fill or fill-in is a departure from the repetitive rhythm pattern in a song. A drum fill can be used to "fill in" the space between the end of one verse and the beginning of another verse or chorus. Fills vary from a simple few strokes on a tom or snare to a distinctive rhythm played on the hi-hat, to sequences several bars long that are short virtuosic drum solos. As well as adding interest and variation to the music, fills serve an important function in indicating significant changes of sections in songs as well as linking them together. A vocal cue is a short drum fill that introduces a singer's entrance into the piece. A fill ending with a cymbal crash on beat one is often used to lead into a chorus or verse.

=== Drum solos ===
A drum solo is an instrumental section without any accompanying instruments that highlights the drums. While other instrument solos are typically accompanied by the other rhythm section instruments (e.g., bass guitar and electric guitar), for most drum solos, the band members stop playing so that all focus will be on the drummer. In some drum solos, the other rhythm section instrumentalists may play "punches" at certain points – sudden, loud chords of short duration. Drum solos are common in jazz but are also used in several rock genres, such as heavy metal and progressive rock. During drum solos, drummers have a degree of creative freedom, allowing them to use complex polyrhythms that would otherwise be unsuitable with an ensemble. In live concerts, drummers may be given extended drum solos, even in genres where drum solos are rare on recordings.

=== Grip ===
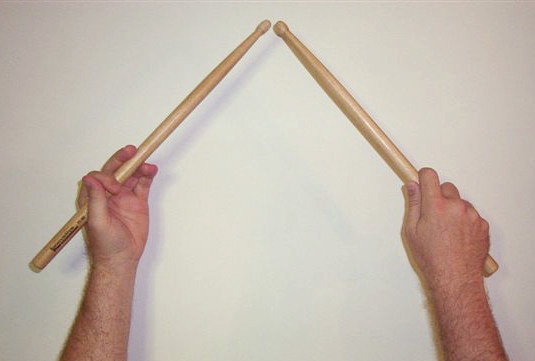
A pair of drumsticks held in traditional grip.

Most drummers hold the drumsticks in one of two types of grip:

1. The traditional grip, or classic grip, originally developed for playing side drum in marching ensembles where the sticks are most commonly held with an overhand grip for the right hand and an underhand grip for the left. This was done because the marching snare drums were slung across the shoulder at an angle, making matched grip unintuitive. Traditional grip is generally more common amongst jazz drummers due to the connection between early jazz music and marching bands.
2. The matched grip, in which both sticks are held the same way, with either the palms facing down (German grip), or at 90º to the drum skin (French grip). Matched grip is considerably more popular among modern drummers.

== Components ==
=== Drums ===
==== Bass drum ====
The bass drum (also known as the "kick drum") is the lowest-pitched drum and usually provides the beat or timing element with basic pulse patterns. Some drummers may use two or more bass drums or a double pedal on a single bass drum, which enables a drummer to play a double-bass-drum style with only one drum. This saves space in recording/performance areas and reduces time and effort during set-up, taking down, and transportation. Double bass drumming is a technique used in certain genres, including heavy metal and progressive rock.

==== Snare drum ====
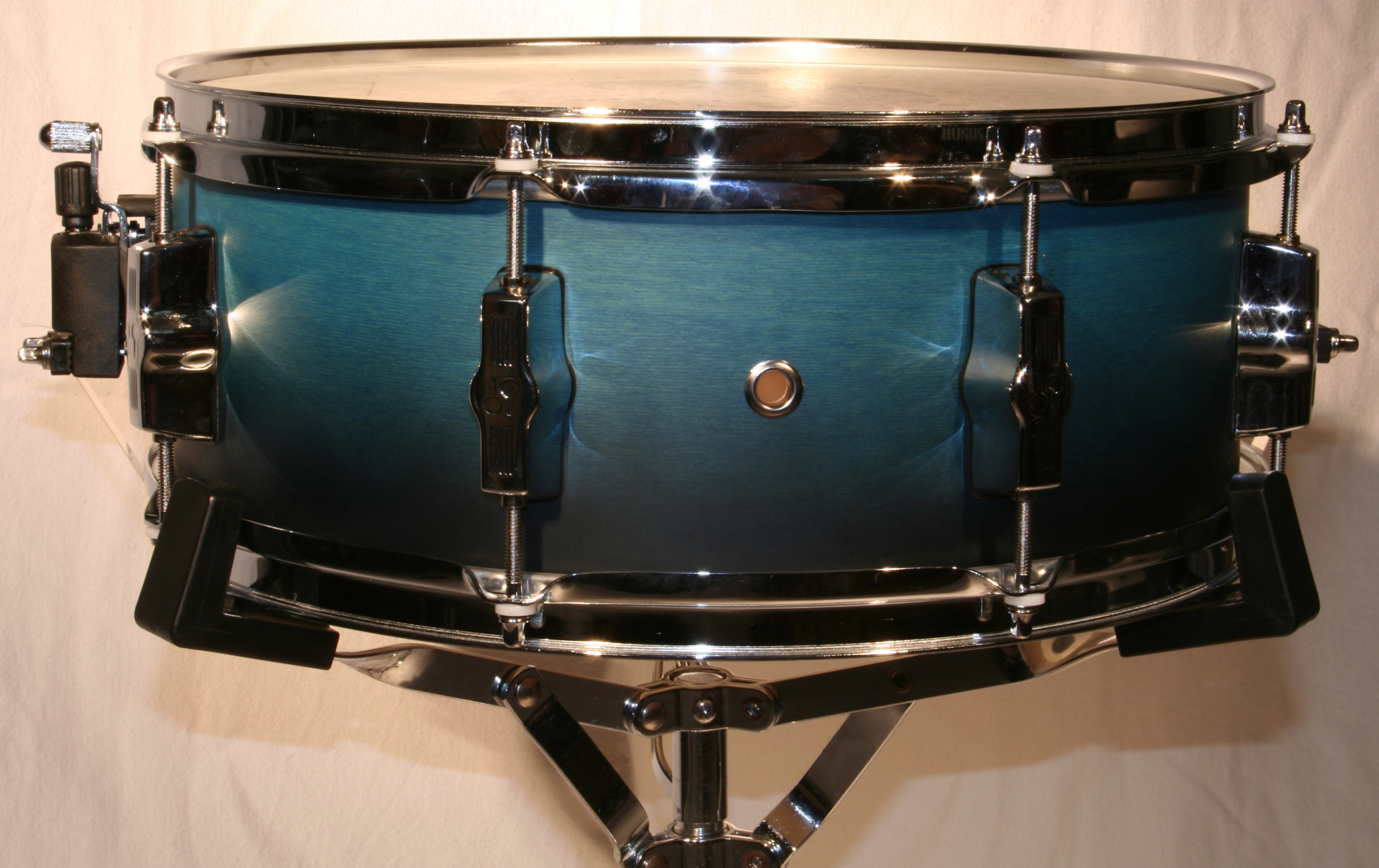
Snare drum on a modern light-duty snare drum stand.

The snare drum provides the backbeat. When applied in this fashion, it supplies strong regular accents played by the non-dominant hand and is the backbone for many fills. Its distinctive sound can be attributed to the bed of stiff metal wires held under tension against the bottom head (known as the snare head). When the top head (known as the batter head) is struck with a drumstick, the snare wires vibrate, creating a snappy, staccato buzzing sound, along with the sound of the stick striking the batter head. Some drummers may use two or more snare drums at a kit, known as secondary snares, to diversify and create different sounds on backbeat.

==== Toms ====
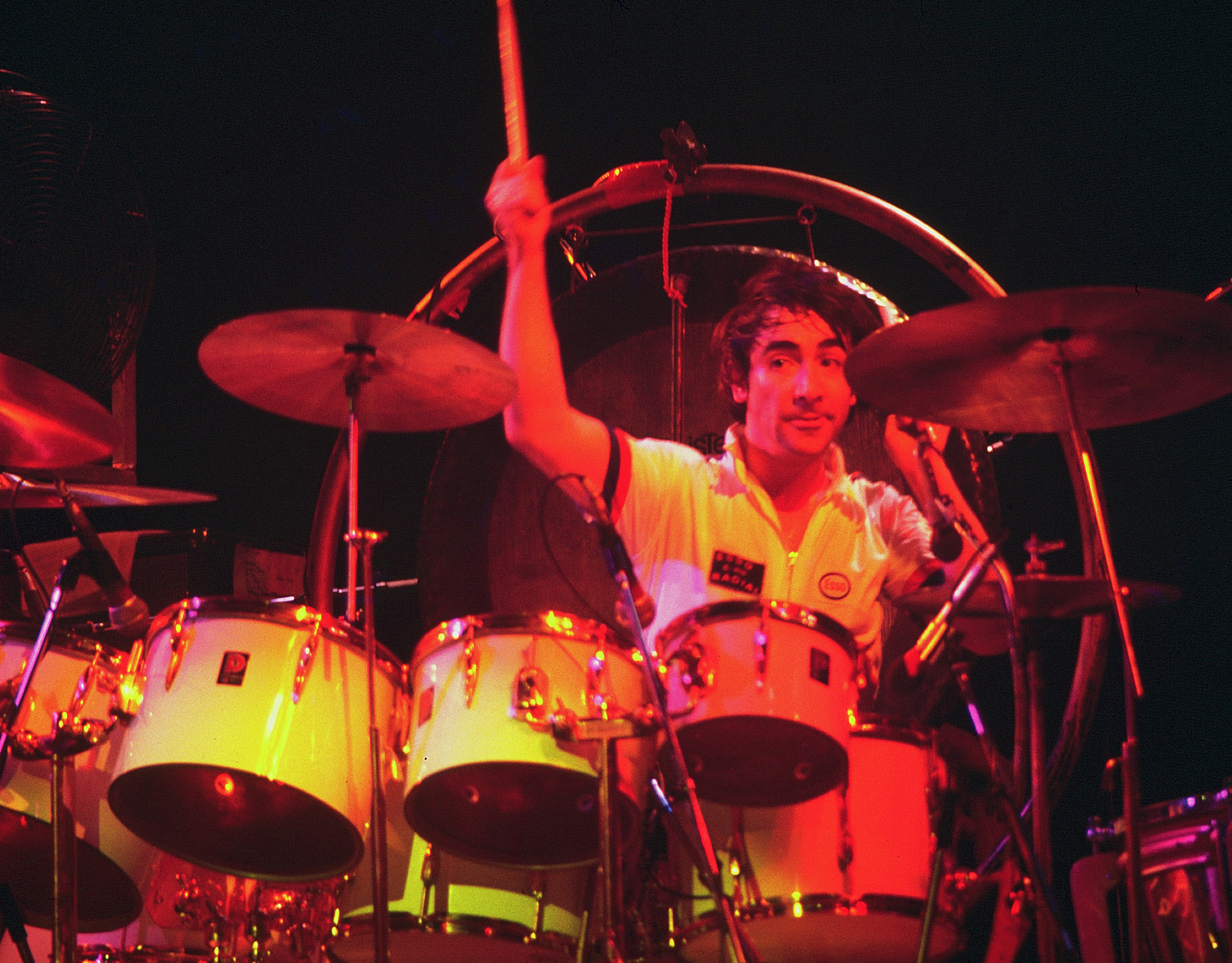
Keith Moon of The Who with a mixture of concert toms and conventional toms, 1975.

Tom-tom drums, or toms for short, are drums without snares and played with sticks (or whatever tools the music style requires) and are the most numerous drums in most kits. They provide the bulk of most drum fills and solos.

They include:

- Traditional double-headed rack toms of varying diameters and depths
- Floor toms (generally the widest and largest toms, which also makes them the lowest-pitched toms)
- Single-headed concert toms
- Rototoms

The smallest and largest drums without snares (octobans and gong drums, respectively) are sometimes considered toms. The naming of common configurations (four-piece, five-piece, etc.) is largely a reflection of the number of toms, as conventionally only the drums are counted, and these configurations all contain one snare and one or more bass drums, (though not regularly any standardized use of two bass/kick drums) the balance usually being made up by toms.

==== Other drums ====
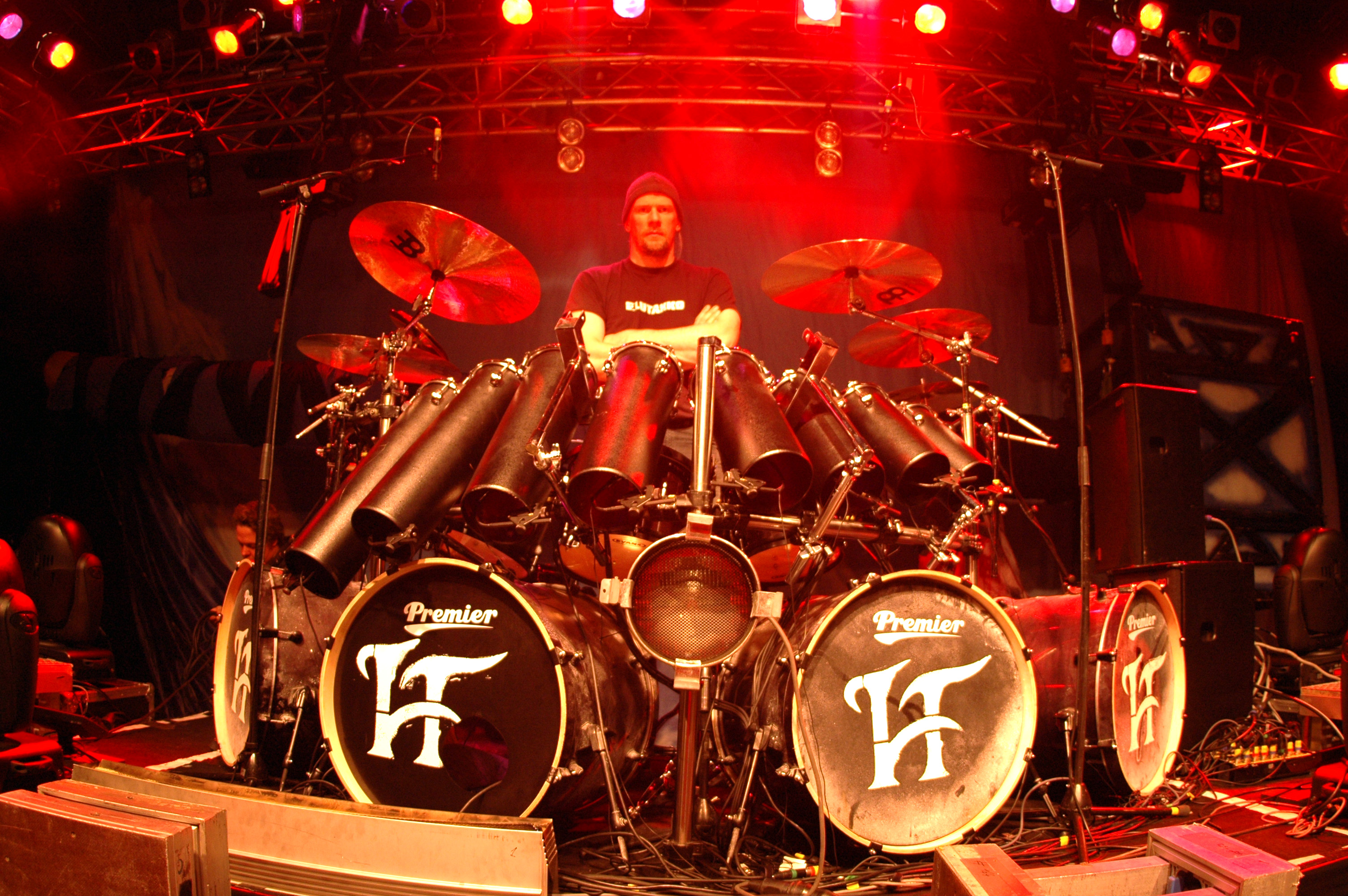
Anders Johansson with an array of octobans.

Octobans are smaller toms designed for use in a drum kit, extending the tom range upwards in pitch, primarily by their great depth and small diameter. They are also called rocket toms and tube toms.

Timbales are tuned much higher than a tom of the same diameter, typically have drum shells made of metal, and are normally played with very light, thin, non-tapered sticks. Timbales are more common in Latin music. They have thin heads and a very different tone than a tom but are used by some drummers/percussionists to extend the tom range upwards. Alternatively, they can be fitted with tom heads and tuned as shallow concert toms.

Attack timbales and mini timbales are reduced-diameter timbales designed for drum kit usage, the smaller diameter allowing for thicker heads providing the same pitch and head tension. They are recognizable in genres of the 2010s and more traditional forms of Latin, reggae, and numerous other styles.

Gong drums are a rare extension of a drum kit. This single-headed mountable drum appears similar to a bass drum (around 20–24 inches in diameter) but is played with sticks rather than a foot-operated pedal and therefore has the same purpose as a floor tom.

Most hand drums cannot be played with drumsticks without risking damage to the head and bearing edge, which is not protected by a metal drum rim. For use in a drum kit, they may be fitted with a metal drum head and played with sticks with care, or played by hand.

=== Cymbals ===
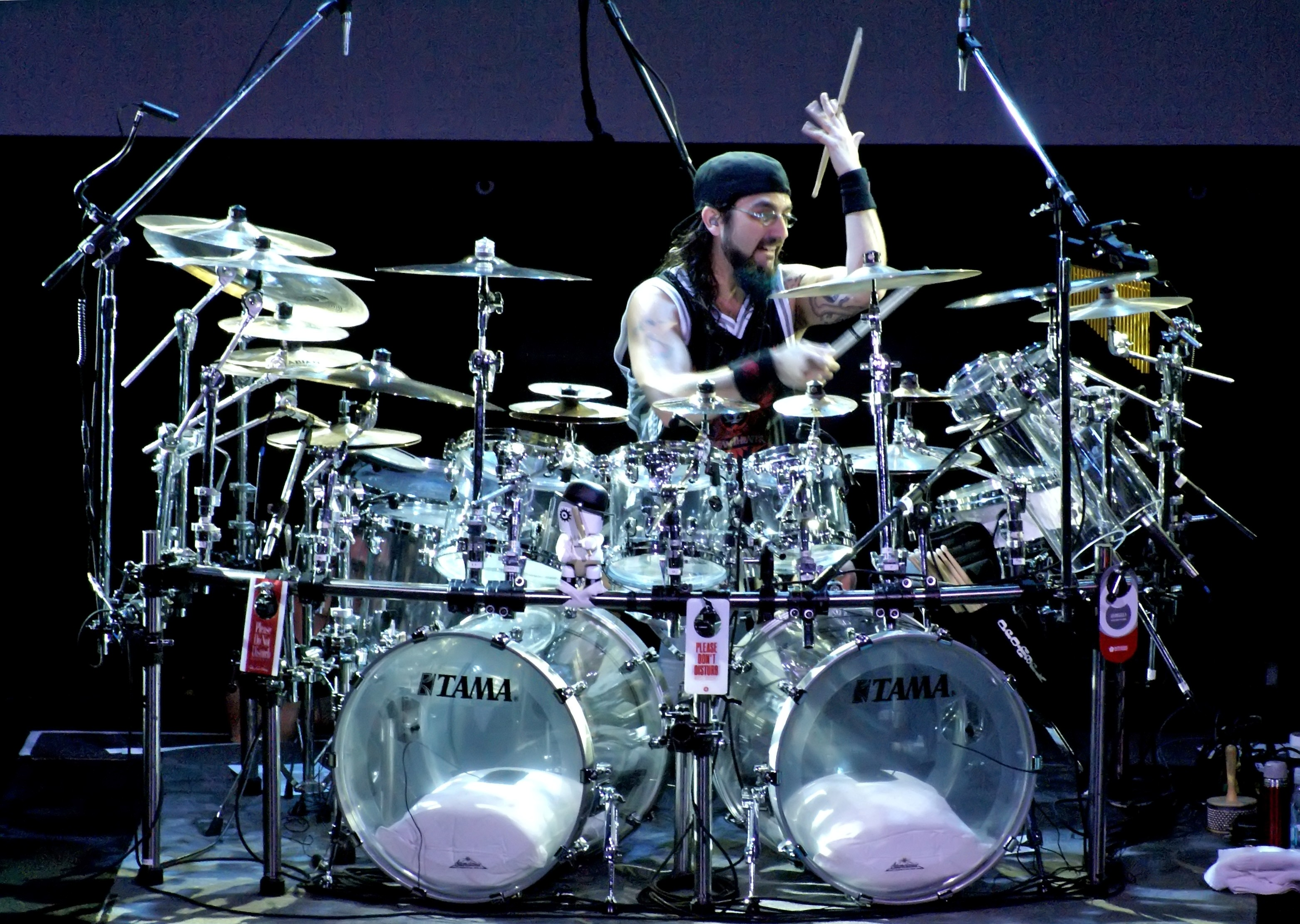
Mike Portnoy, drummer of Dream Theater, with a multitude of cymbals. Rio de Janeiro, 7 March 2008.

In most drum kits and drum/percussion kits, cymbals are as prominent as the drums themselves. The oldest idiophones in music are cymbals, a version of which were used throughout the ancient Near East very early in the Bronze Age period. Cymbals are mostly associated with Turkey and Turkish craftsmanship, where Zildjian has made them since 1623.

While most drummers purchase cymbals individually, beginner cymbal packs were brought to market to provide entry-level cymbals for the novice drummer. The kits normally contain four cymbals: one ride, one crash, and a pair of hi-hats. Some contain only three cymbals, using a crash/ride instead of the separate ride and crash. The sizes closely follow those given in Common configurations below. Most drummers extend the normal configuration by adding another crash, a splash, a china cymbal or an effects cymbal.

==== Ride cymbal ====
The ride cymbal is most often used for keeping a constant rhythm pattern, every beat or more often, as the music requires. Development of this ride technique is generally credited to jazz drummer Baby Dodds.

Most drummers have a single main ride, located near their dominant hand – within easy playing reach, as it is used regularly – often a 20"–22" in diameter, but diameters of 16"–26" are not uncommon. It is usually a medium-heavy- to heavy-weight cymbal whose sound cuts through other instrumental sounds. Some drummers use a swish cymbal, sizzle cymbal, or other exotic or lighter metal rides, as the main or only ride in their kit, particularly for jazz, gospel, or ballad/folk sounds. In the 1960s, Ringo Starr of the Beatles used a sizzle cymbal as a second ride, particularly during guitar solos.

==== Hi-hats ====
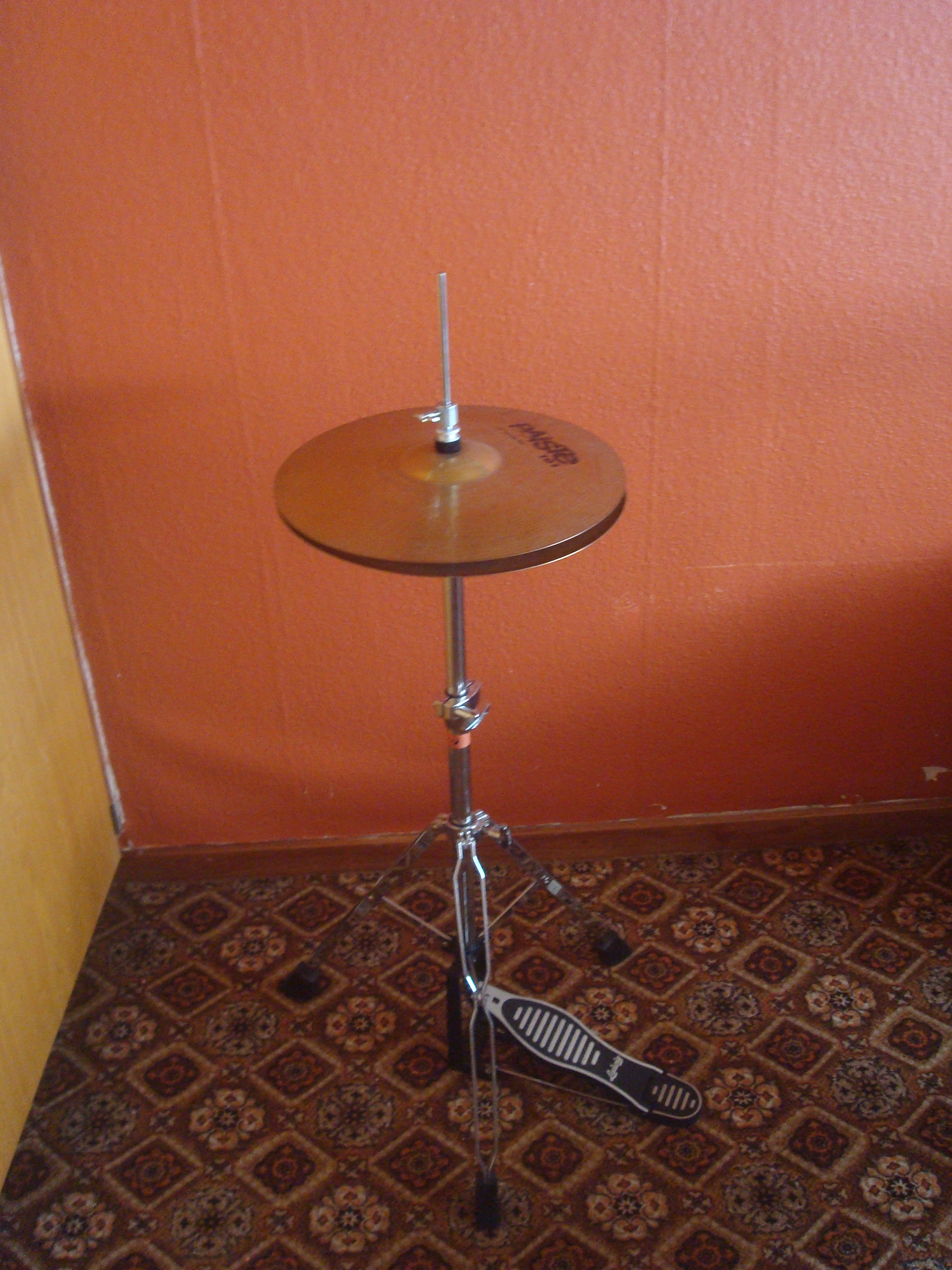
Two hi-hat cymbals mounted in a pedal-operated stand, which allows the drummer to close or open the cymbals.

Hi-hat cymbals (nicknamed "hats") consist of two cymbals mounted, one upside down, with their bottoms facing each other, on a hollow metal support cylinder with folding support legs that keep the support cylinder vertical. Like the bass drum, the hi-hat has a foot pedal. The bottom cymbal is fixed in place. The top cymbal is mounted on a thin rod, which is inserted into the hollow cymbal stand. The thin rod is connected to a foot pedal. When the foot pedal is pressed down, it causes the thin rod to move down, causing the upper cymbal to move and strike the lower. When the foot is lifted off the pedal, the upper cymbal rises, due to the pedal's spring-loaded mechanism. The hi-hats can be sounded by striking the cymbals with one or two sticks or just by closing and opening the cymbals with the foot pedal. The ability to create rhythms on the hi-hats with the foot alone expands the drummer's ability to create sounds, as the hands are freed up to play on the drums or other cymbals. Different sounds can be created by striking "open hi-hats" (without the pedal depressed, which creates a noisy sound nicknamed "sloppy hats") or a crisp "closed hi-hats" sound (with the pedal pressed down). High hats can also be struck with the pedal partially depressed.

A unique effect can be created by striking an open hi-hat (where the two cymbals are apart) and then closing the cymbals with the foot pedal. This effect is widely used in disco and funk. The hi-hat has a similar function to the ride cymbal; the two are rarely played consistently for long periods at the same time, but one or the other is often used to keep what is known as the "ride rhythm" (e.g., eighth or sixteenth notes) in a song. The hi-hats are played by the right stick of a right-handed drummer. Changing between ride and hi-hat, or between either and a "leaner" sound with neither, is often used to mark a change from one song section to another.

==== Crashes ====
Crash cymbals are usually the strongest accent markers within the kit, marking crescendos and climaxes, vocal entries, and major changes of mood, swells, and effects. A crash cymbal is often accompanied by a strong kick on the bass drum pedal, both for musical effect and to support the stroke. It provides a fuller sound and is a commonly taught technique.

In jazz, using the smallest kits and at very high volumes, ride cymbals may be played with the technique and sound of a crash cymbal. Some hi-hats will also give a useful crash, particularly thinner hats or those with a severe taper. Alternatively, specialized crash/ride and ride/crash cymbals are designed to combine both functions.

=== Other cymbals ===
==== Effects cymbals ====
All cymbals, other than rides, hi-hats, and crashes/splashes, are usually called effects cymbals when used in a drum kit, though this is a non-classical or colloquial designation that has become standardized. Most extended kits include one or more splash cymbals and at least one china cymbal. Major cymbal makers produce cymbal extension packs consisting of one splash and one china, or more rarely a second crash, a splash, and a china, to match some of their starter packs of ride, crash, and hi-hats. However, any combination of options can be found in the marketplace.

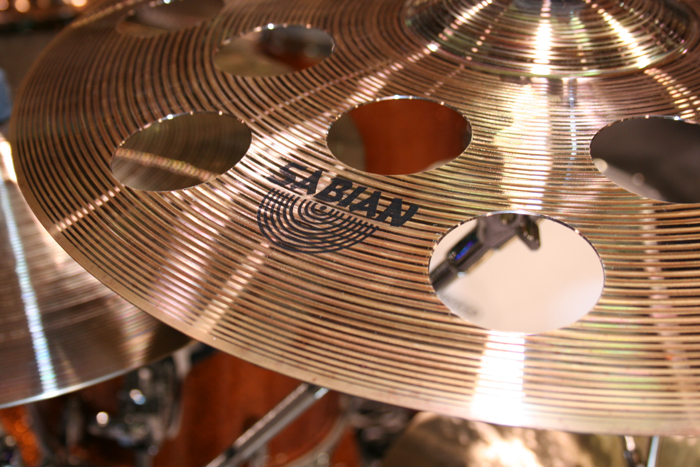
Sabian O-zone "vented" crash cymbal.

Some cymbals may be considered effects in some kits but "basic" in another set of components. Likewise, O-zone crashes have the same purpose as a standard crash cymbal, but are considered to be effects cymbals due to their rarity, and the holes cut into them, which provide a darker, more resonant attack. Many drummers use cymbal stacks which is the practice of stacking multiple cymbals, usually effects cymbals, splashes or crashes, on top of each other which creates a short, sharp sound, sometimes reminiscent of a hand clap or hi-hat.

==== Accent cymbals ====
Cymbals, of any type, used to provide an accent, rather than a regular pattern or groove, are known as accent cymbals. While any cymbal can be used to provide an accent, the term is more narrowly applied to cymbals for which the main purpose is to provide an accent. Accent cymbals include chime cymbals, small-bell domed cymbals, and those cymbals with a clear sonorous/oriental chime to them, such as specialized crash, splash, and china cymbals.

==== Low-volume cymbals ====
Low-volume cymbals are a specialty type of cymbal, made to produce about 80% less volume than a typical cymbal. The entire surface of the cymbal is perforated by holes. Drummers use low-volume cymbals to play in small venues or as a way to practice without disturbing others.

=== Other acoustic instruments ===
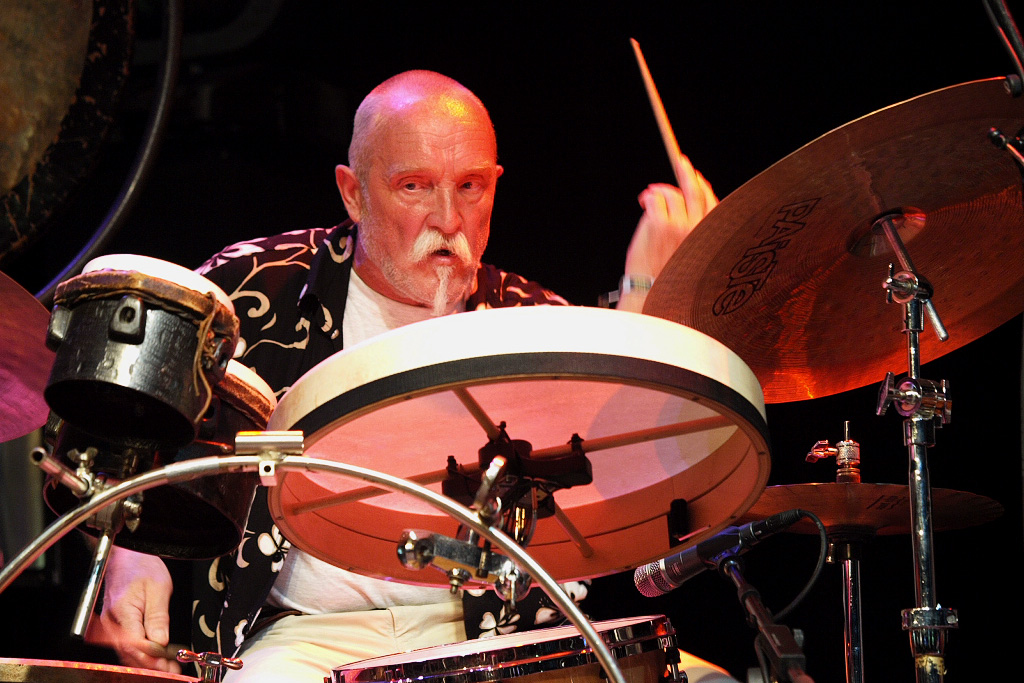
Günter Sommer with bodhrán and bongo drums in his kit.

Other instruments that have regularly been incorporated into drum kits include:

- Wood block and cowbell, especially in classic rock and other genres.
- Tambourine, particularly mounted on the hi-hat stand above the cymbals; an ordinary tambourine can be used, or a tambourine produced specially for drum kit use.
- Timbales can be used to extend the range of tom-toms, particularly when the drummer owns them for other musical settings; a traditional timbale is tuned far higher than a tom of the same diameter, so the result is not always the most ideal.
- Keyboard percussion instruments, such as tubular bells or a glockenspiel.
- Gongs.
- Triangles.
- Found objects, including spanners, brake drums, buckets, cardboard boxes, washboards, oil barrels, and jam and kerosene tins (anything ordinary that can be struck to produce sounds, patterns, and grooves).

See also Extended kits below.

=== Electronic drums ===
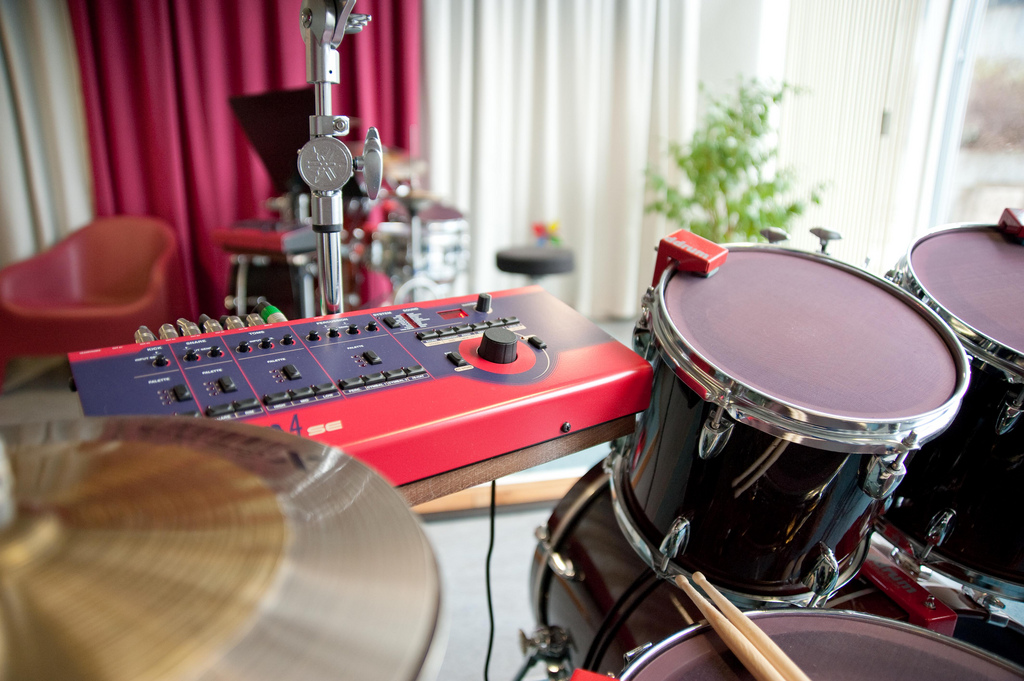
Triggers sensors in use, here they are red and mounted on the rims of the snare drum, bass drum and hanging toms. The larger box in the same color of red is the "brain" to which they are connected.

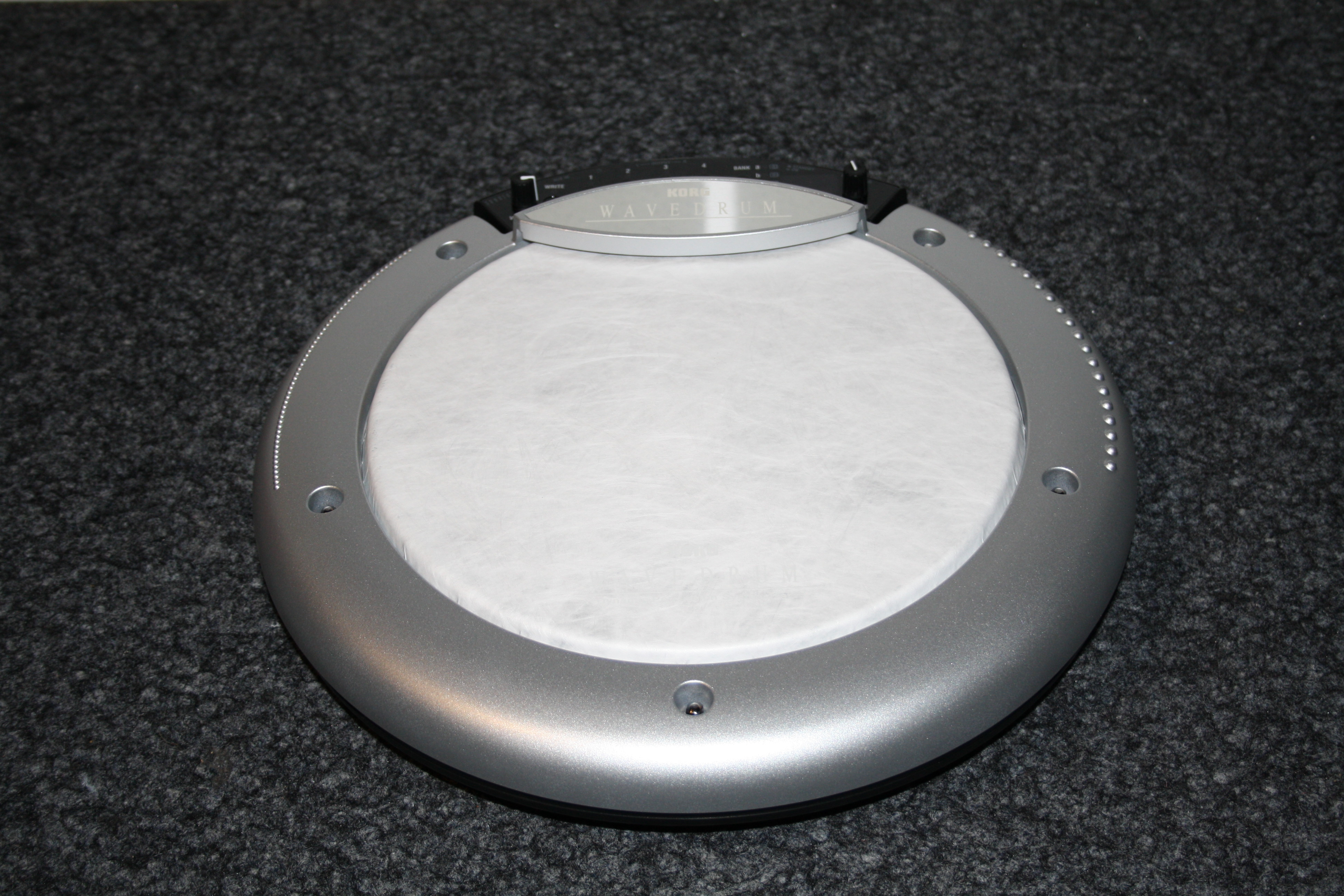
A Korg trigger pad.

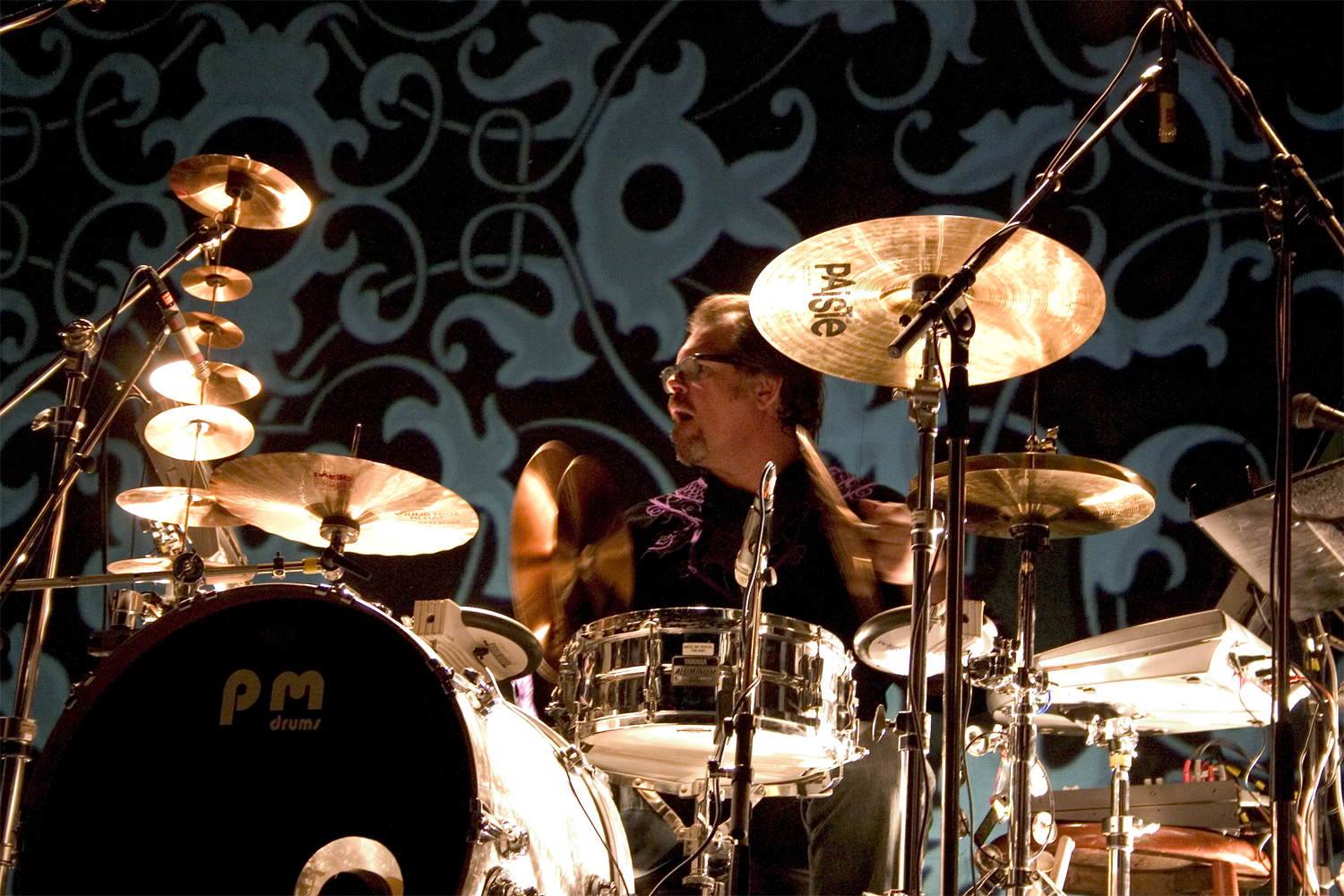
Pat Mastelotto playing a kit with both acoustic and electronic drums, 2005.

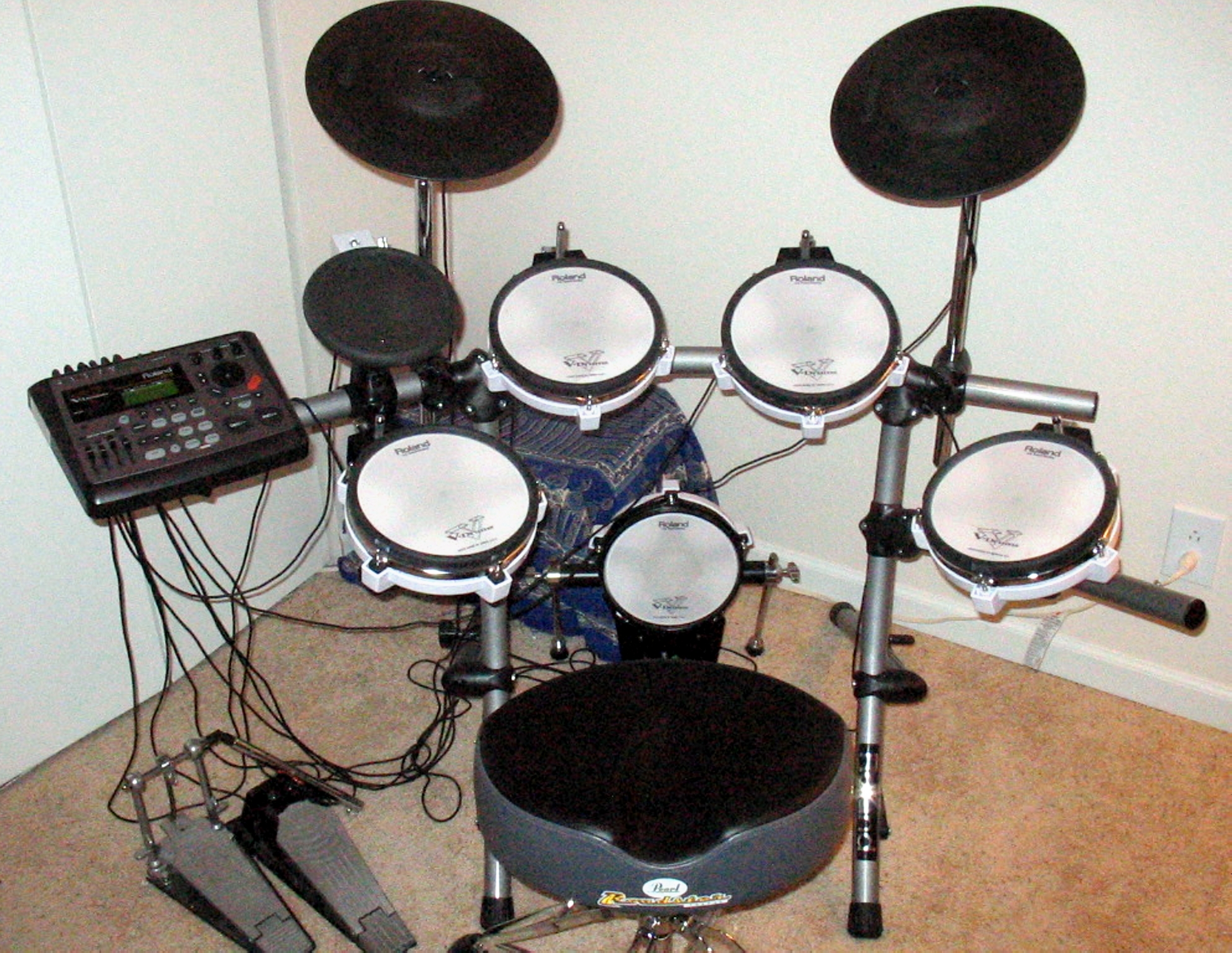
Drum controllers, such as the Roland V-Drums, are often built in the form of an acoustic drum kit. The unit's sound module is mounted to the left.

Electronic drums are used for many reasons. Some drummers use electronic drums for playing in small venues, such as coffeehouses or church services, where a very low volume for the band is desired. Since fully electronic drums do not create any acoustic sound (apart from the quiet sound of the stick hitting the sensor pads), all of the drum sounds come from a keyboard amplifier or PA system; as such, the volume of electronic drums can be much lower than an acoustic kit. Some use electronic drums as practice instruments because they can be listened to with headphones, which enable a drummer to practice without disturbing others. Others use electronic drums to take advantage of the huge range of sounds that modern drum modules can produce, which range from sampled sounds of real drums, cymbals, and percussion instruments such as gongs or tubular bells that would be impractical to take to a small gig, to electronic and synthesized sounds, including non-instrument sounds such as ocean waves.

A fully electronic kit is easier to soundcheck than acoustic drums, assuming that the electronic drum module has levels that the drummer has preset in their practice room; in contrast, when an acoustic kit is sound checked, most drums and cymbals need to be mic'd and each mic needs to be tested by the drummer so its level and tone equalization can be adjusted by the sound engineer. Also, even after all the individual drum and cymbal mics are sound checked, the engineer needs to listen to the drummer play a standard groove, to check that the balance between the kit instruments is right. Finally, the engineer needs to set up the monitor mix for the drummer, which the drummer uses to hear their instruments and the instruments and vocals of the rest of the band. With a fully electronic kit, many of these steps can be eliminated.

Drummers' usage of electronic drum equipment can range from adding a single electronic pad to an entire drum kit (e.g., to have access to an instrument that might otherwise be impractical, such as a large gong), to using a mix of acoustic drums/cymbals and electronic pads, to using an acoustic kit in which the drums and cymbals have triggers, which can be used to sound electronic drums and other sounds, to having an exclusively electronic kit, which is often set up with the rubber or mesh drum pads and rubber "cymbals" in the usual drum kit locations. A fully electronic kit weighs much less and takes up less space to transport than an acoustic kit and it can be set up more quickly. One of the disadvantages of a fully electronic kit is that it may not have the same "feel" as an acoustic kit, and the drum sounds, even if they are high-quality samples, may not sound the same as acoustic drums.

Electronic drum pads are the second most widely used type of MIDI performance controllers, after electronic keyboards. Drum controllers may be built into drum machines, they may be standalone control surfaces (e.g., rubber drum pads), or they may emulate the look and feel of acoustic percussion instruments. The pads built into drum machines are typically too small and fragile to be played with sticks, so they are usually played with fingers. Dedicated drum pads such as the Roland Octapad or the DrumKAT are playable with hands or sticks and are often built to resemble the general form of acoustic drums. There are also percussion controllers such as the vibraphone-style MalletKAT, and Don Buchla's Marimba Lumina.

MIDI triggers can also be installed into acoustic drum and percussion instruments. Pads that trigger a MIDI device can be homemade from a piezoelectric sensor and a practice pad or other piece of foam rubber, which is possible in two ways:

- Triggers are sensors that can be attached to acoustic drum kit components. In this way, an electronic drum sound will be produced when the instrument is played/struck, as well as the original acoustic sound, if so desired.
- Trigger pads can be mounted alongside other kit components. These pads make no significant acoustic sound themselves (if not modified to do otherwise), but are used purely to trigger the electronic sounds from the "drum brain". They are played with the same drum sticks as are used on other drum kit components.

In either case, an electronic control unit (sound module/"brain") with suitable sampled/modeled or synthesized drum sounds, amplification equipment (a PA system, keyboard amp, etc.), and stage monitor speakers are required to hear the electronically produced sounds. See Triggered drum kit.

A trigger pad could contain up to four independent sensors, each of them capable of sending information describing the timing and dynamic intensity of a stroke to the drum module/brain. A circular drum pad may have only one sensor for triggering, but a 2016-era cymbal-shaped rubber pad/cymbal will often contain two; one for the body and one for the bell at the center of the cymbal, and perhaps a cymbal choke trigger, to allow drummers to produce this effect.

Trigger sensors are most commonly used to replace the acoustic drum sounds, but they can also be used effectively with an acoustic kit to augment or supplement an instrument's sound for the needs of the session or show. For example, in a live performance in a difficult acoustical space, a trigger may be placed on each drum or cymbal and used to trigger a similar sound on a drum module. These sounds are then amplified through a PA system so the audience can hear them, and they can be amplified to any level without the risks of audio feedback or bleed problems associated with microphones and PAs in certain settings.

The sound of electronic drums and cymbals themselves is heard by the drummer and possibly other musicians in close proximity, but, even so, the foldback (audio monitor) system is usually fed from the electronic sounds rather than the live acoustic sounds. The drums can be heavily dampened (made to resonate less or have the sound subdued), and their tuning and quality is less critical in the latter scenario. In this way, much of the atmosphere of the live performance is retained in a large venue, but without some of the problems associated with purely microphone-amplified drums. Triggers and sensors can also be used in conjunction with conventional or built-in microphones. If some components of a kit prove more difficult to mic than others (e.g., an excessively "boomy" low tom), triggers may be used on only the more difficult instruments, balancing out a drummer's/band's sound in the mix.

Trigger pads and drums, on the other hand, when deployed in a conventional set-up, are most commonly used to produce sounds not possible with an acoustic kit, or at least not with what is available. Any sound that can be sampled/recorded can be played when the pad is struck, by assigning the recorded sounds to specific triggers. Recordings or samples of barking dogs, sirens, breaking glass, and stereo recordings of aircraft taking off and landing have all been used. Along with the more obvious electronically generated drums, there are other sounds that (depending on the device used) can also be played/triggered by electronic drums.

==== Virtual drums ====
Virtual drums are a type of audio software that simulates the sound of a drum kit using synthesized drum kit sounds or digital samples of acoustic drum sounds. Different drum software products offer a recording function, the ability to select from several acoustically distinctive drum kits (e.g., jazz, rock, metal), as well as the option to incorporate different songs into the session. Some computer software can turn any hard surface into a virtual drum kit using only one microphone.

=== Hardware ===
Hardware is the name given to the metal stands that support the drums, cymbals, and other percussion instruments. Generally, the term also includes the hi-hat pedal and clutch, and bass drum pedal or pedals, and the drum stool.

Hardware is carried along with sticks and other accessories in the traps case, and includes:

- Cymbal stands
- Hi-hat stand
- Floor tom legs
- Tom-tom drum brackets or arms
- Snare drum stand
- Bass drum pedal or pedals
- Drum key
- Assorted accessories such as spare washers, cymbal sleeves, wire snare cords, washers for tension rods, etc.

Many or even all of the stands may be replaced by a drum rack, which is particularly useful for large drum kits.

Drummers often set up their own drum hardware onstage and adjust it to their comfort level. Major bands on tour will often have a drum tech who knows how to set up the drummer's hardware and instruments in the desired location and with the desired configuration.

== Common configurations ==
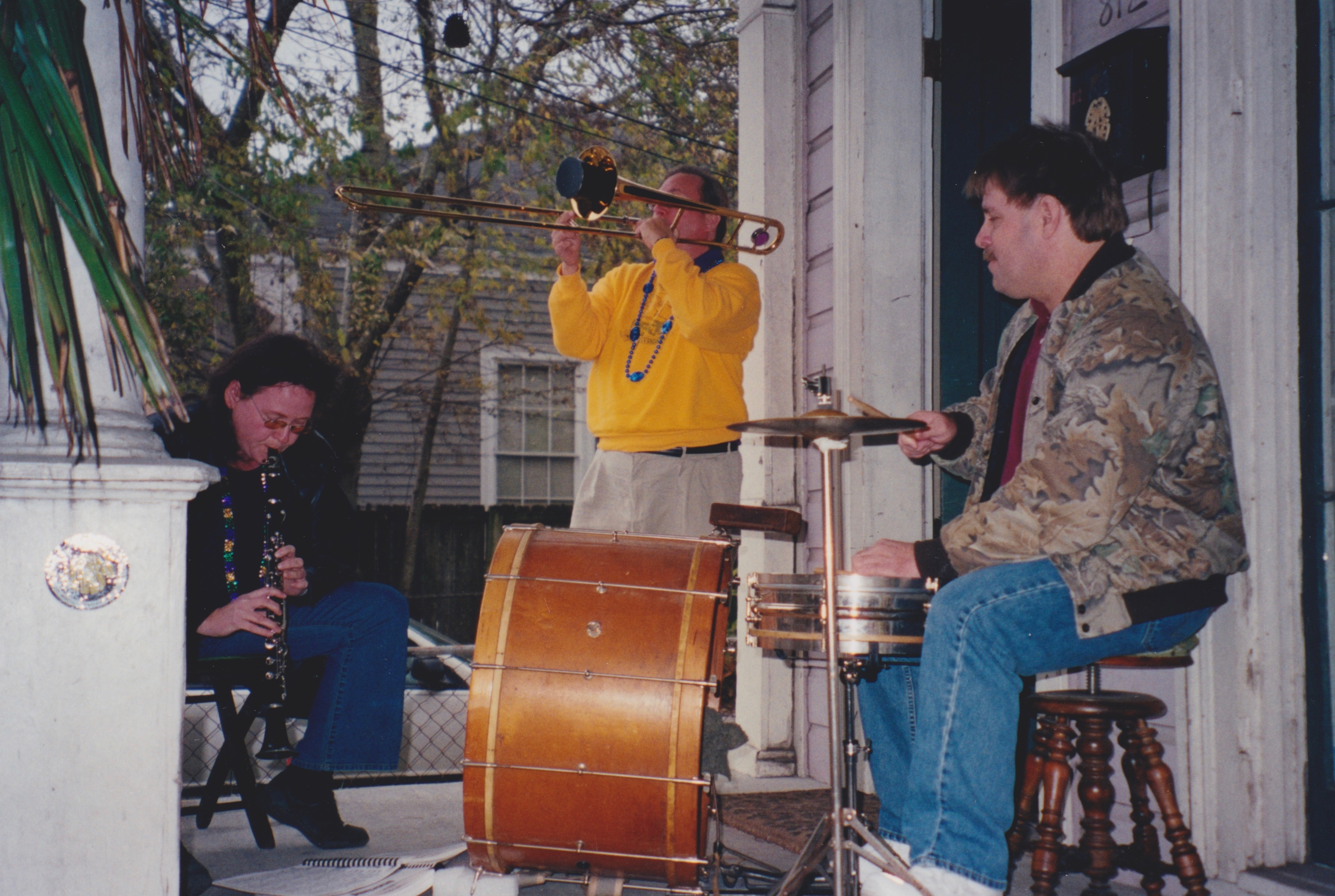
A two-piece kit in action.

Drum kits are traditionally categorized by the number of drums, ignoring cymbals and other instruments. Snare, tom-tom, and bass drums are always counted; other drums, such as octobans, may or may not be counted.

Traditionally, in America and the United Kingdom, drum sizes are expressed as depth x diameter, both measured in inches. Many drum kit manufacturers have recently been expressing sizes as diameter x depth, still in inches. For example, a hanging tom 12 inches in diameter and 8 inches deep would be described by Tama as 8 inches × 12 inches, but by Pearl as 12 inches × 8 inches, and a standard diameter Ludwig snare drum 5 inches deep is a 5-inch × 14-inch instrument, while the UK's Premier Manufacturer offers the same dimensions as a 14-inch × 5-inch snare. The sizes of drums and cymbals given below are typical. Many instruments differ slightly or radically from them. Where no size is given, it is because there is too much variety to give a typical size.

=== Three-piece ===
A conventional three-piece kit consists of a bass drum, snare drum (14" diameter), hi-hat (12–14"), hanging tom (12 x 8-9" depth), and a suspended 14"–18" cymbal, the latter two mounted on the bass drum. These kits were most common in the 1950s and 1960s.

It is a common configuration for children.

=== Four-piece ===
A four-piece kit adds a second mounted tom (a notable user is Chris Frantz of Talking Heads) which displaces the cymbal. It is 10" diameter and 8" deep for fusion, or 13" diameter and one inch deeper than for the 12" diameter tom. Otherwise, a 14" diameter hanging tom is added to the 12", both being 8" deep. In any case, both toms are most often mounted on the bass drum with the smaller of the two next to the hi-hats (which are to the left for a right-handed drummer).

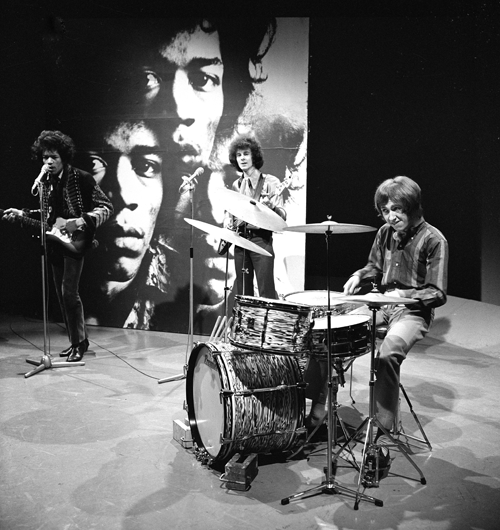
Mitch Mitchell playing a classic four-piece kit in the Jimi Hendrix Experience.

Typically another cymbal is added, so there are separate ride and crash, either on two stands, or with the ride mounted on the bass drum to the player's right and the crash on a separate stand. The standard crash is a 16" diameter, and 18"–20" ride (20" being the most common).

These kits are particularly useful for smaller venues, where space is limited, such as coffeehouses, cafés, hotel lounges, and small pubs.

==== Four piece with floor tom ====
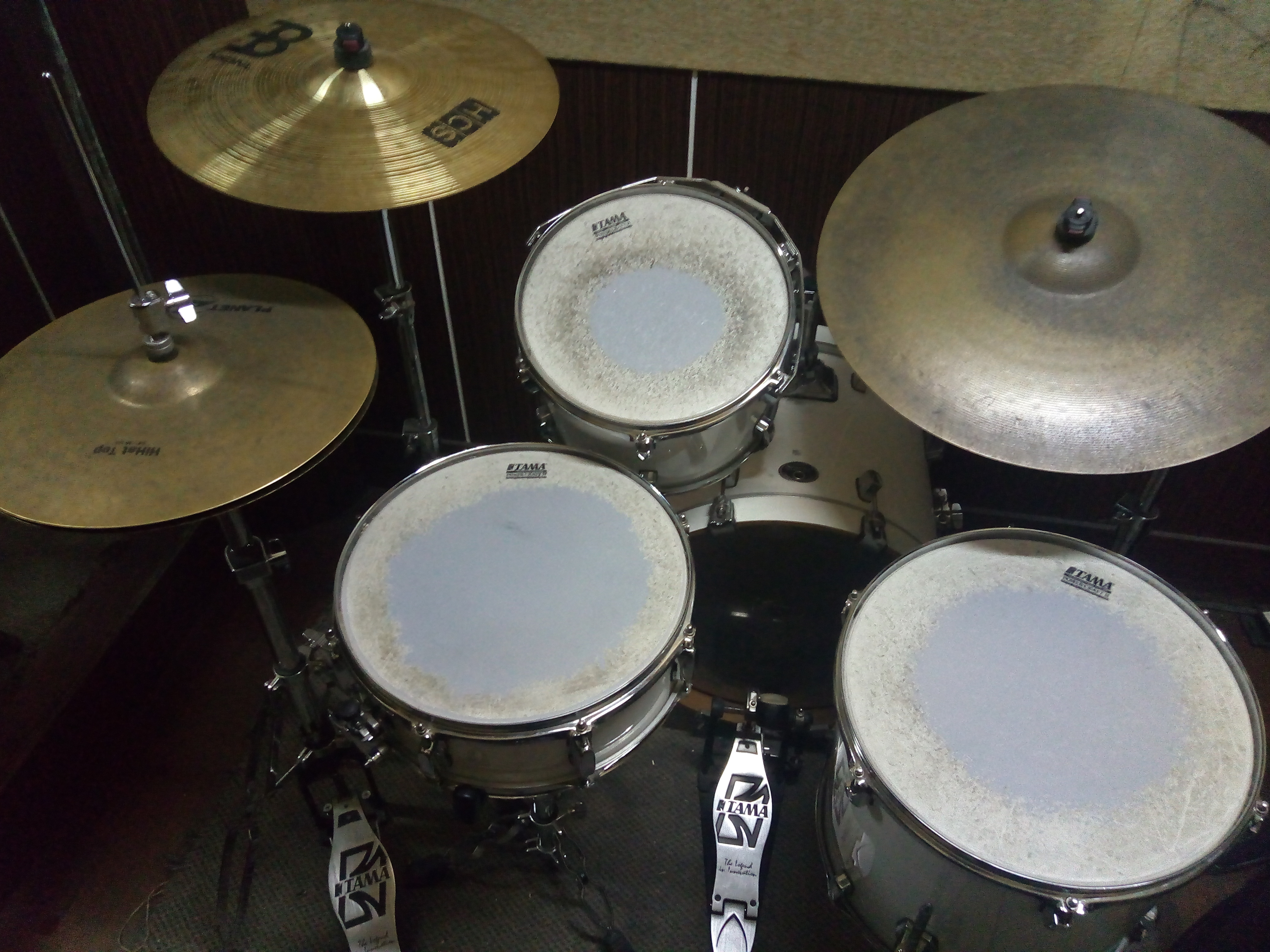
A vintage four-piece kit in a conservatory practice room

When a floor tom is added rather than a mounted tom to make a four-piece kit, the floor tom is usually 14" for jazz, and 16" otherwise. Outside of jazz, the four-piece kit is widely used in rock, pop and rhythm and blues. In addition, it is also the most common setup for music schools and for novice players.

Notable users include Ringo Starr of The Beatles, Mitch Mitchell of the Jimi Hendrix Experience, John Barbata of the Turtles, and numerous jazz drummers throughout the 20th century including Art Blakey, Buddy Rich, and Jo Jones. For jazz, which normally emphasizes the use of a ride cymbal for swing patterns, the lack of second hanging tom in a four-piece kit allows the cymbal to be positioned closer to the drummer, making it easier to play.

=== Five-piece ===
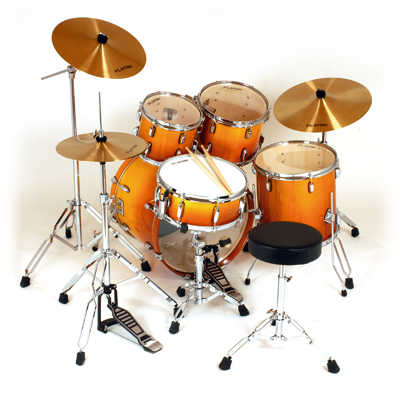
A five-piece kit for popular music, with one crash cymbal and no effects cymbals, complete with throne and sticks.

The five-piece kit is the full-size kit and is the most common configuration for various genres and styles, including pop, rock, jazz fusion and even electronic music. It adds a third tom to the four-piece kit, making for three toms in all. A fusion kit will normally add a 14" tom, either a second floor tom or a hanging tom on a stand to the right of the bass drum; in either case, making the tom lineup 10", 12" and 14". Having three toms enables drummers to have high-, middle-, and low-pitched toms, which gives them more options for fills, solos, and breaks.

Other kits will normally have 12" and 13" hanging toms and either a 14" hanging tom on a stand, a 14" floor tom, or a 16" floor tom. It is common to have 10" and 12" hanging toms, with a 16" floor tom. This configuration is often called a hybrid setup. The bass drum is most commonly 22" in diameter, but rock kits may use 24", fusion 20", jazz 18", and, in larger bands, up to 26". A second crash cymbal is common, typically an inch or two larger or smaller than the 16" one, with the larger of the two to the right for a right-handed drummer. A big band drummer may use crashes up to 20" and a ride up to 24" or, very rarely, 26". A rock kit may also substitute a larger ride cymbal or larger hi-hats, typically 22" for the ride and 15" for the hats.

Most five-piece kits, except for entry-level, also have one or more effects cymbals. Adding cymbals beyond the basic ride, hi-hats, and one-crash configuration requires more stands, in addition to the standard drum hardware packs. Because of this, many higher-cost kits for professionals are sold with little or no hardware, to allow the drummer to choose the stands and bass drum pedal they prefer. At the other extreme, many inexpensive, entry-level kits are sold as a five-piece kit complete with two cymbal stands, most often one straight and one boom, and some even with a standard cymbal pack, a stool, and a pair of 5A drum sticks. In the 2010s, digital kits were often offered in a five-piece kit, usually with one plastic crash cymbal trigger and one ride cymbal trigger. Fully electronic drums do not produce any acoustic sound beyond the quiet tapping of sticks on the plastic or rubber heads. Their trigger-pads are wired up to a synth module or sampler.

=== Small kits ===
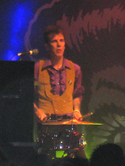
Slim Jim Phantom playing a two-piece kit while standing.

If the toms are omitted completely, or the bass drum is replaced by a pedal-operated beater on the bottom skin of a floor tom and the hanging toms omitted, the result is a two-piece cocktail drum kit, originally developed for cocktail lounge acts. Such kits are particularly favored in musical genres such as trad jazz, bebop, rockabilly, and jump blues. Some rockabilly kits and beginner kits for very young players omit the hi-hat stand. In rockabilly, this allows the drummer to play standing rather than seated. A very simple jazz kit for informal or amateur jam sessions consists of a bass drum, snare drum, and hi-hat, often with only a single cymbal (normally a ride, with or without sizzlers).

Although these kits may be small with respect to the number of drums used, the drums themselves are most often of normal size, or even larger in the case of the bass drum. Kits using smaller drums, in both smaller and larger configurations, are for particular uses, such as boutique kits designed to reduce the visual impact of a large kit, kits that need to fit into small spaces in coffeehouses, traveling kits to reduce luggage volume, and junior kits for very young players. Smaller drums also tend to be quieter, again suiting smaller venues, and many of these kits extend this with extra muffling, which allows for quiet or even silent practice.

=== Extended kits ===
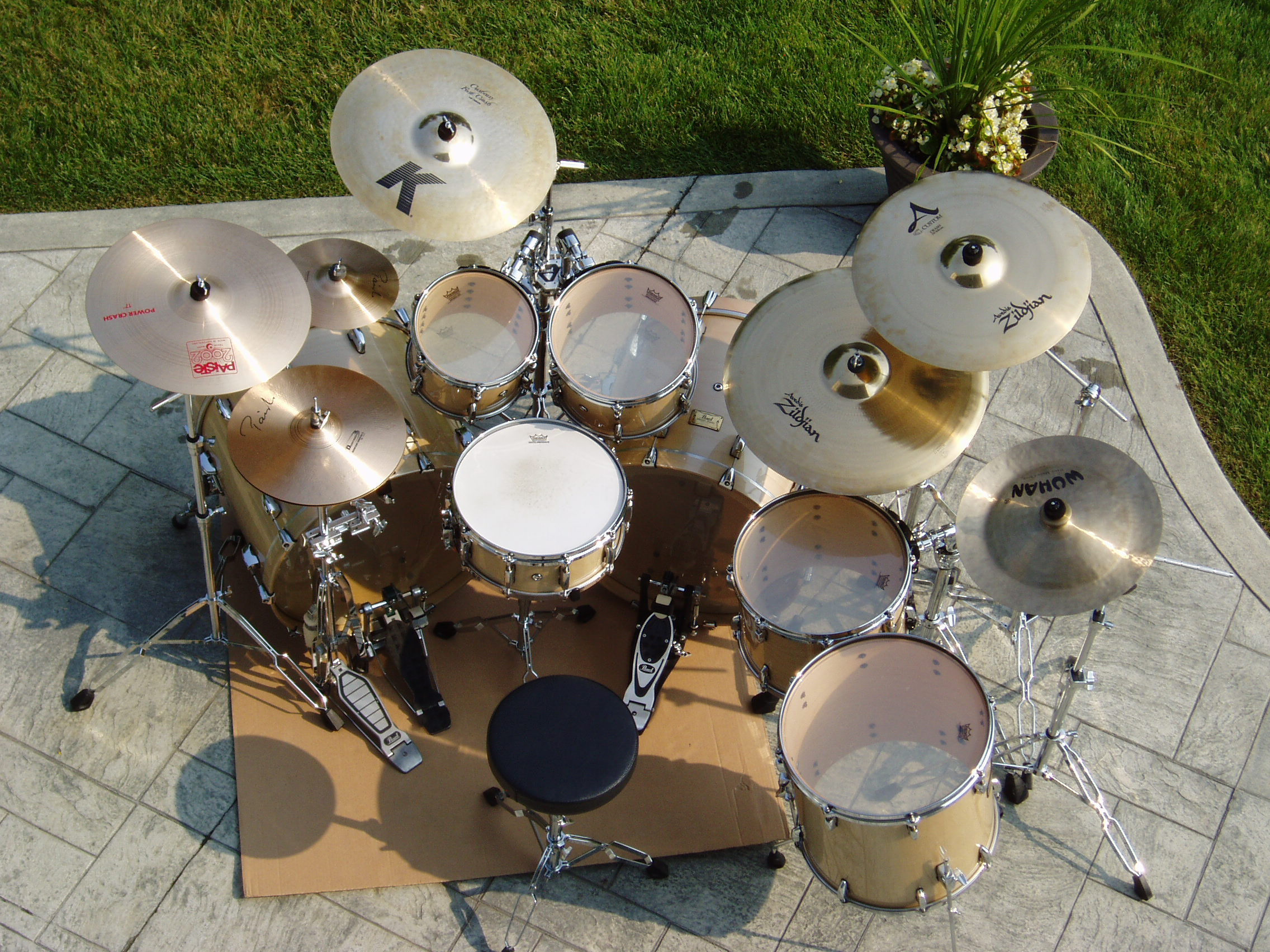
A seven-piece kit typically used for heavy metal, elaborate jazz fusion, and progressive rock, consisting of double bass drums, two-floor toms, and an extended set of cymbals (three crashes with splash and China-type).

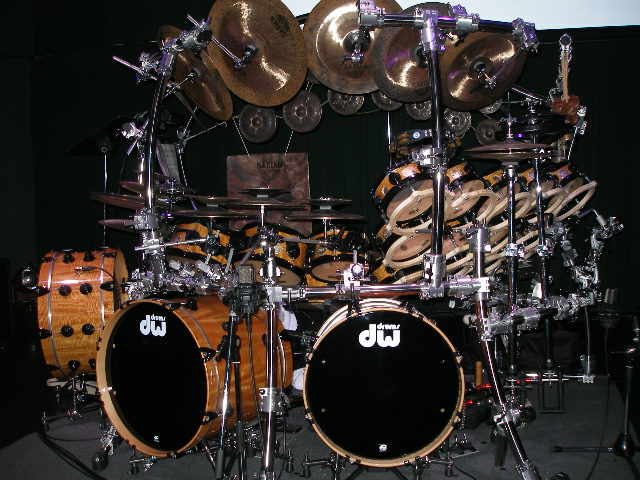
A very large kit played by Terry Bozzio.

Common extensions beyond the standard configurations include:

- Effects cymbals, particularly splash cymbals and china cymbals. Both are essential in genres such as jazz fusion and Latin jazz
- Double bass drums or a double bass pedal, a standard for heavy metal music
- Extra rack toms and crash cymbals, allowing broader variations for drum solos or breaks
- A crash/ride cymbal, in addition to the main ride cymbal
- A second floor tom, either larger or smaller than the first
- One or more octobans, or a pair of timbales
- A second pair of hi-hats mounted as cable hats or x-hats
- Cymbal stacks, notably common in heavy metal and progressive rock
- Different types of gongs
- Multiple ride cymbals; a sizzle cymbal, thinner and larger than the main ride, was once common as a second ride or crash/ride, even in a four-piece kit, but is now less so (jazz drummers, however, may still have two or more ride cymbals, even as part of a small kit).
- An additional electronic sound module or sequencer, typical for electronic genres like electropop and hip-hop

See also other acoustic instruments above. Another versatile extension becoming increasingly common is the use of some electronic drums in a mainly acoustic kit.

Less common extensions found particularly, but not exclusively, in very large kits, include:

- Multiple snare drums, usually in the form of side snares. A side snare is usually positioned to the left of the drummer (opposite the floor toms and to the left of the hi hat). Side snares are used, similarly to effects cymbals, when an additional and different sound is required. Generally only one side snare is used in a kit, if any at all.
- Multiple bass drums beyond the double bass drum setup
- Gong drums (single-headed bass drums, played with sticks or mallets)
- Sets of gongs, tuned or untuned
- Sound effect percussion, such as a thunder sheet, bar chimes or a rainstick
- One or more crotales
- Instruments "borrowed" from orchestral percussion, such as timpani
- Instruments "borrowed" from marching band percussion, such as the tuned bass drums used in the drumline

== Accessories ==
=== Sticks ===
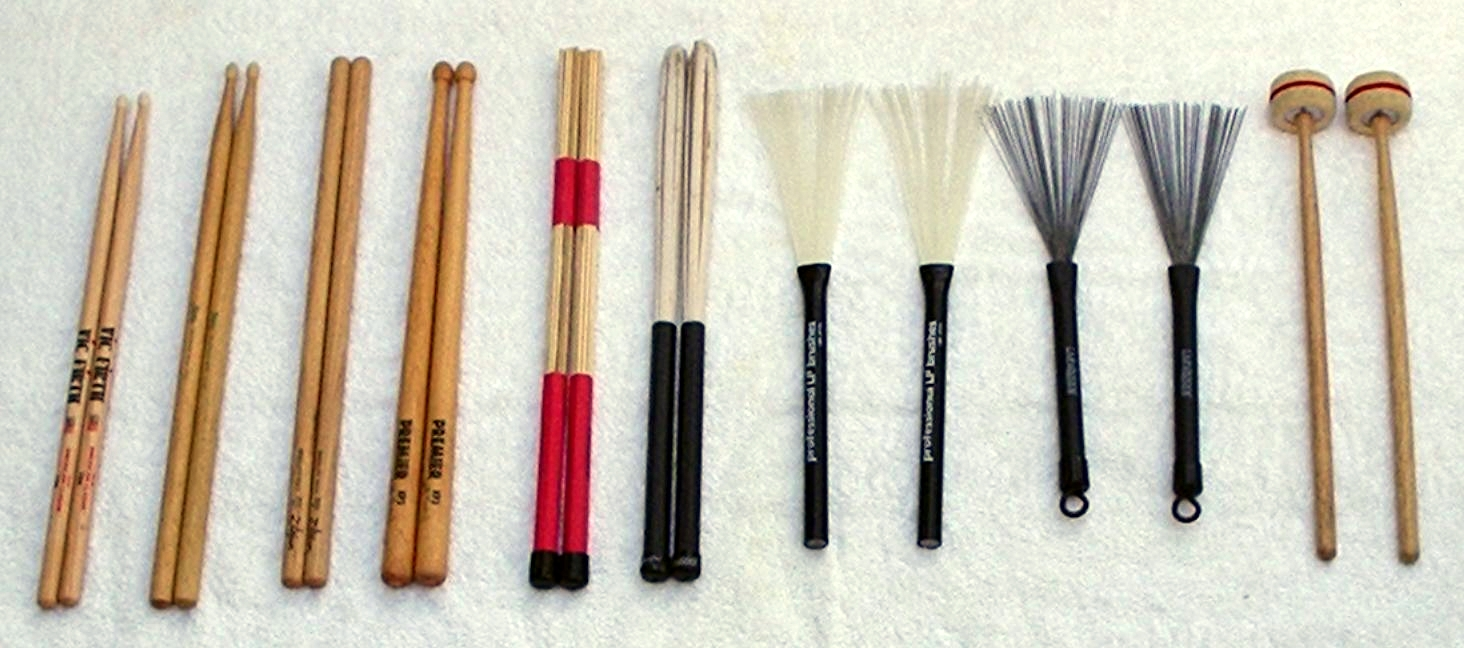
Tools of the trade: 7A, 5B, "double bummer", and side drum No. 3 sticks, standard 19 cane rutes, sheathed 7 cane rutes, nylon brushes, steel brushes, and cartwheels.

Sticks are traditionally made from wood (particularly maple, hickory, and oak), but more recently, metal, carbon fiber, and other materials have been used for sticks. The prototypical wooden drum stick was primarily designed for use with the snare drum, and optimized for playing snare rudiments. Sticks come in a variety of weights and tip designs; 7N is a common jazz stick with a nylon tip, while a 5B is a common wood tipped stick, heavier than a 7N but with a similar profile, and a common standard for beginners. Numbers range from 1 (heaviest) to 10 (lightest).

The meanings of both numbers and letters vary from manufacturer to manufacturer, and some sticks are not described using this system at all, just being known as Smooth Jazz (typically a 7N or 9N) or Speed Rock (typically a 2B or 3B) for example. Many famous drummers endorse sticks made to their particular preference and sold under their signature.

Besides drumsticks, drummers will also use brushes and rutes in jazz and similar soft music. More rarely, other beaters such as cartwheel mallets (known to kit drummers as "soft sticks") may be used. It is not uncommon for rock drummers to use the "wrong" (butt) end of a stick for a heavier sound; some makers produce tipless sticks with two butt ends.

A stick bag is the standard way for a drummer to bring drumsticks to a live performance. For easy access, the stick bag is commonly mounted on the side of the floor tom, just within reach of the drummer's right hand, for a right-handed drummer.

=== Muffles ===
Mylar muffle ring on snare.

Drum muffles are types of mutes that can reduce the ring, boomy overtone frequencies, or overall volume on a snare, bass, or tom. Controlling the ring is useful in studio or live settings when unwanted frequencies can clash with other instruments in the mix. There are internal and external muffling devices which rest on the inside or outside of the drumhead, respectively. Common types of mufflers include muffling rings, gels and duct tape, and improvised methods, such as placing a wallet near the edge of the head. Some drummers muffle the sound of a drum by putting a cloth over the drumhead.

Snare drum and tom-tom Typical ways to muffle a snare or tom include placing an object on the outer edge of the drumhead. A piece of cloth, a wallet, gel, or fitted rings made of mylar are common objects. Also used are external clip-on muffles. Internal mufflers that lie on the inside of the drumhead are often built into a drum, but are generally considered less effective than external muffles, as they stifle the initial tone, rather than simply reducing its sustain.

Bass drum Muffling the bass can be achieved with the same muffling techniques as for the snare, but bass drums in a drum kit are more commonly muffled by adding pillows, a sleeping bag, or other soft filling inside the drum, between the heads. Cutting a small hole in the resonant head can also produce a more muffled tone, and allows the manipulation of internally placed muffling. The Evans EQ pad places a pad against the batterhead and, when struck, the pad moves off the head momentarily, then returns to rest against the head, thus reducing the sustain without choking the tone.

Silencers/mutes Another type of drum muffler is a piece of rubber that fits over the entire drumhead or cymbal. It interrupts contact between the stick and the head, which dampens the sound. They are typically used in practice settings.

Cymbals are usually muted with the fingers or hand, to reduce the length or volume of ringing (e.g., the cymbal choke technique which is a key part of heavy metal drumming). Cymbals can also be muted with special rubber rings or duct tape. Cymbals can also be muted by using a pair of magnetic discs, which are applied to both sides of the cymbal to reduce sustained notes.

Historical uses Muffled drums are often associated with funeral ceremonies as well, such as the funerals of Queen Victoria and John F. Kennedy. The use of muffled drums has been written about by such poets as Henry Wadsworth Longfellow, John Mayne, and Theodore O'Hara. Drums have also been used for therapy and learning purposes, such as when an experienced player will sit with a number of students and by the end of the session have all of them relaxed and playing complex rhythms.

=== Stick holder ===
There are various types of stick holder accessories, including bags that can be attached to a drum and angled sheath-style stick holders, which can hold a single pair of sticks.

=== Sizzlers ===
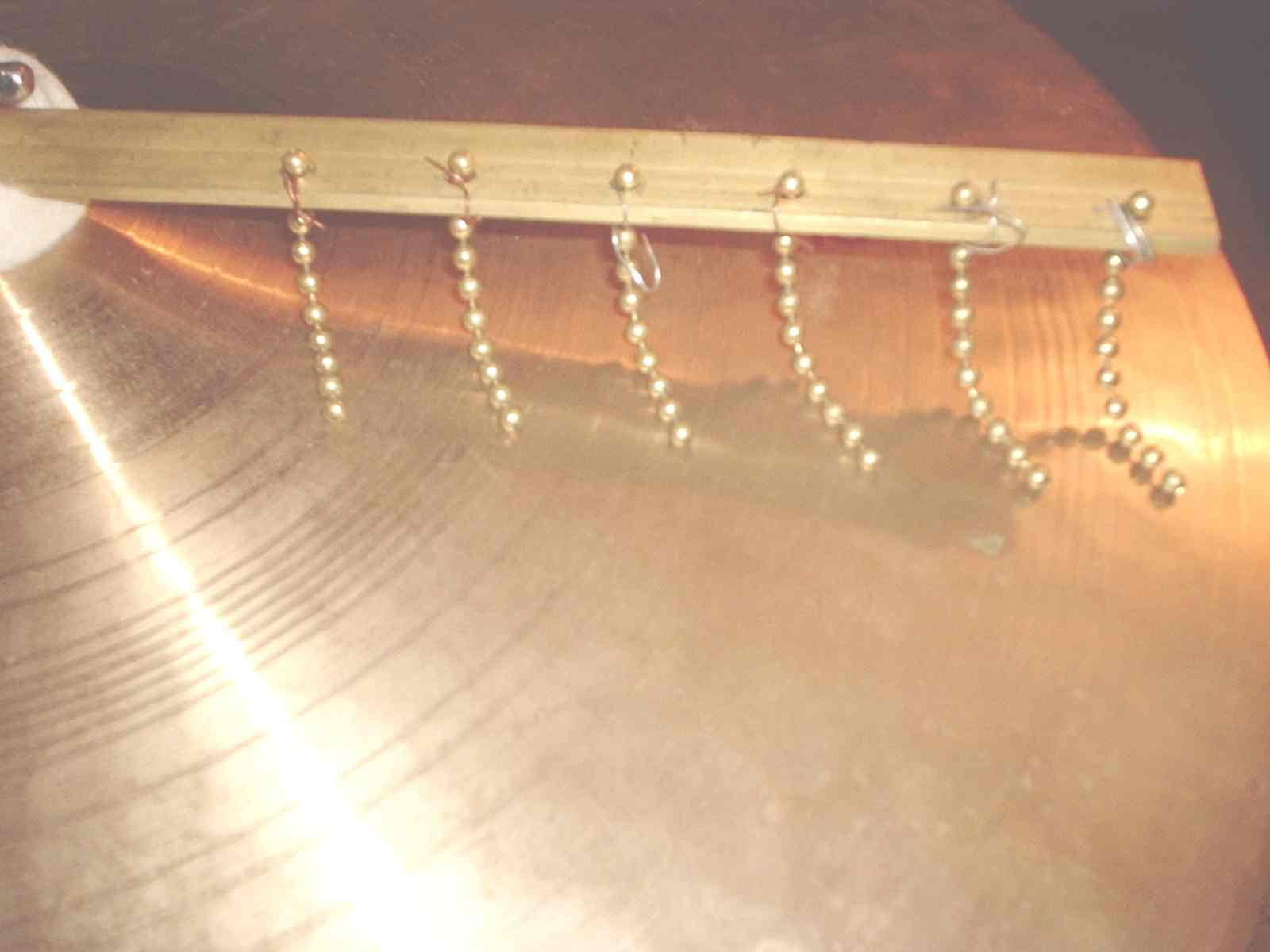
Paiste 2002 18" medium cymbal fitted with a chain sizzler.

A sizzler is a metal chain, or combination of chains, that is hung across a cymbal, creating a distinctive metallic sound when the cymbal is struck, similar to that of a sizzle cymbal. Using a sizzler is the non-destructive alternative to drilling holes in a cymbal and putting metal rivets in the holes. Another benefit of using a "sizzler" chain is that the chain is removable, with the cymbal being easily returned to its normal sound.

Some sizzlers feature pivoting arms that allow the chains to be quickly lowered onto, or raised from, the cymbal, allowing the effect to be used for some songs and removed for others.

=== Cases ===
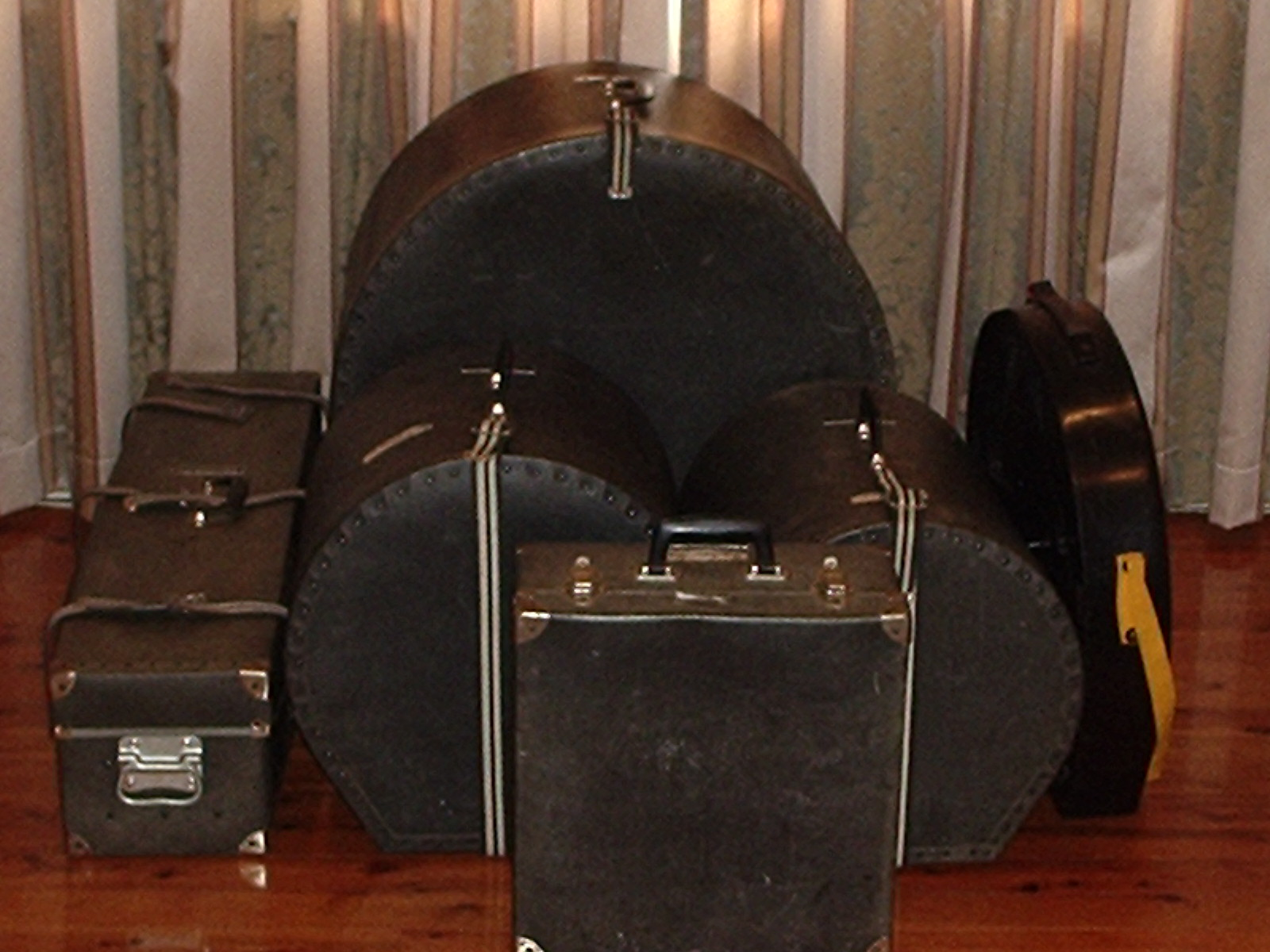
From left: traps case, floor tom case, snare case (front), twin hanging toms case, cymbal case, bass drum case (rear).

Three types of protective covers are common for kit drums:

- Drum bags are made from robust cloth such as cordura or from cloth-backed vinyl. They give minimal protection from bumps and impacts, but they do protect drums and cymbals from precipitation. They are adequate for drums transported in private vehicles to local gigs and sessions. They are often the only option for young drummers who are just starting out.
- Mid-price hard cases are of similar construction to suitcases, commonly made of fiber composite. The offer more protection from bumps than cloth bags.
- Flight cases or road cases are standard for professional touring drummers.

As with all musical instruments, the best protection is provided by a combination of a hard-shelled case with interior padding, such as foam, next to the drums and cymbals.

=== Microphones ===
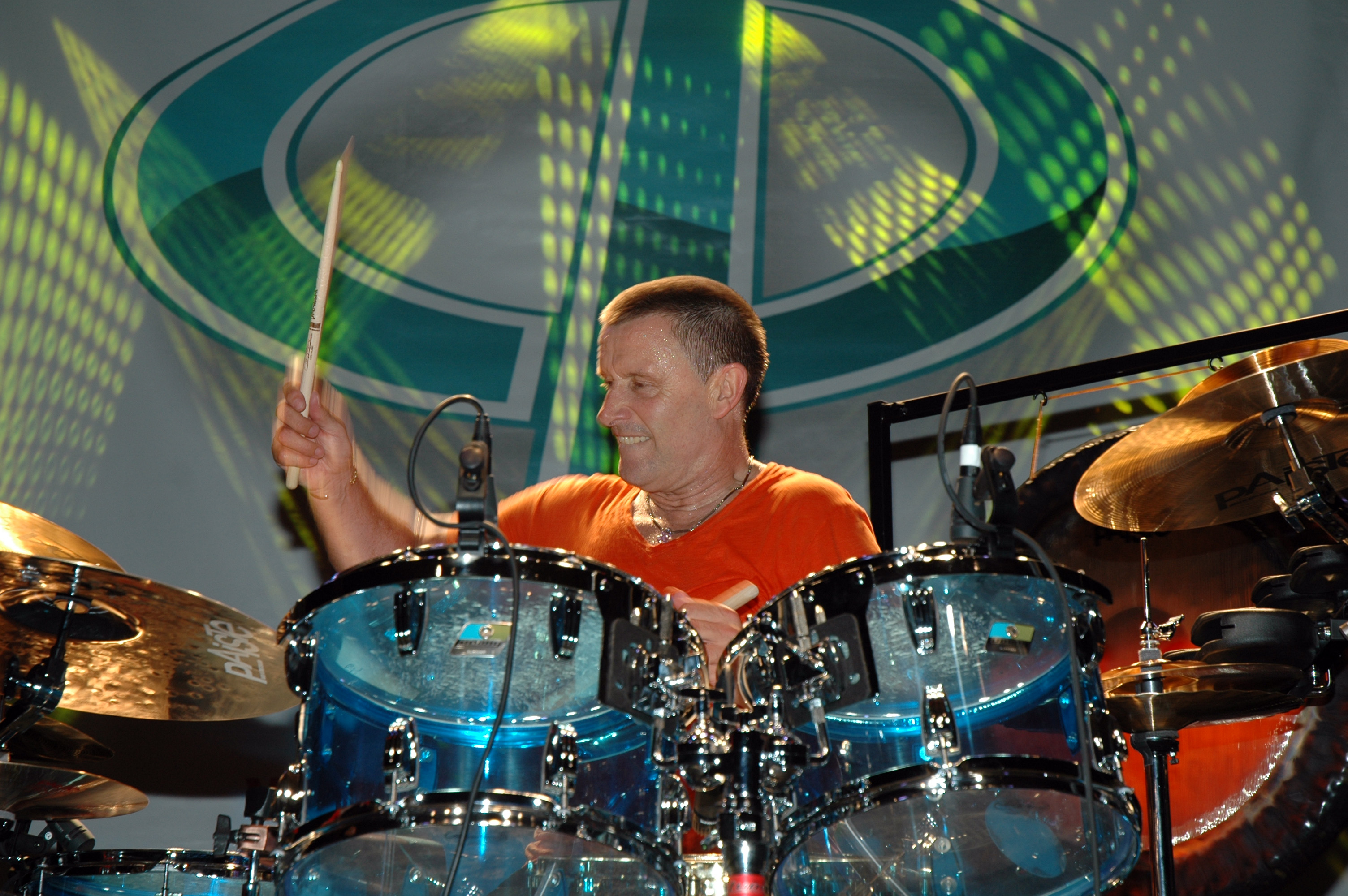
Carl Palmer with rim-mounted tom mics.

Microphones ("mics") are used with drum kits to pick up the sound of the drums and cymbals for a sound recording or to pick up the sound of the drum kit so that it can be amplified through a PA system or sound reinforcement system. While most drummers use microphones and amplification in live shows, so that the sound engineer can adjust the levels of the drums and cymbals, some bands that play quieter genres of music and in small venues, such as coffeehouses, play acoustically, without mics or PA amplification. Small jazz groups, such as jazz quartets or organ trios that are playing in a small bar, will often just use acoustic drums. Of course, if the same small jazz groups play on the mainstage of a big jazz festival, the drums will be miced so that they can be adjusted in the sound system mix. A middle-ground approach is used by some bands that play in small venues: they do not mic every drum and cymbal, but only the instruments that the sound engineer wants to be able to control in the mix, such as the bass drum and the snare.

In miking a drum kit, dynamic microphones, which can handle high sound-pressure levels, are usually used to close-mic drums, which is predominantly the way to mic drums for live shows. Condenser microphones are used for overheads and room mics, an approach which is more common with sound recording applications. Close miking of drums may be done using stands or by mounting the microphones on the rims of the drums. For tom-toms lacking resonant heads, microphones may be placed inside of the drum.

For some styles of music, drummers use electronic effects on drums, such as individual noise gates that mute the attached microphone when the signal is below a threshold volume. This allows the sound engineer to use a higher overall volume for the drum kit by reducing the number of "active" mics which could produce unwanted feedback at any one time. When a drum kit is entirely miked and amplified through the sound reinforcement system, the drummer or the sound engineer can add other electronic effects to the drum sound, such as reverb or digital delay.

=== Monitors ===
Drummers using electronic drums, drum machines, or hybrid acoustic-electric kits (which blend traditional acoustic drums and cymbals with electronic pads) typically use a monitor speaker, keyboard amplifier, or even a small PA system to hear the electronic drum sounds. Even a drummer playing entirely acoustic drums may use a monitor speaker to hear the drums, especially if playing in a loud rock or metal band, where there is substantial onstage volume from large, powerful guitar stacks. Drummers are often given a large speaker cabinet with a 15" subwoofer to help them monitor their bass drum sound (along with a full-range monitor speaker to hear the rest of their kit). Some sound engineers and drummers prefer to use an electronic vibration system, colloquially known as a "butt shaker" or "throne thumper" to monitor the bass drum, because this lowers the stage volume. With a "butt shaker", the "thump" of each bass drum strike causes a vibration in the drum stool; this way the drummer feels their beat on the posterior, rather than hears it.

In-Ear Monitors are also popular among drummers since they also work as earplugs.

=== Bass drum gear ===
A number of accessories are designed for the bass drum. The bass drum can take advantage of the bass reflex speaker design, in which a tuned port (a hole and a carefully measured tube) are put in a speaker enclosure to improve the bass response at the lowest frequencies. Bass drumhead patches protect the drumhead from the impact of the felt beater. Bass drum pillows are fabric bags with filling or stuffing that can be used to alter the tone or resonance of the bass drum. A less expensive alternative to using a specialized bass drum pillow is to use an old sleeping bag.

=== Gloves ===
Some drummers wear special drummer's gloves to improve their grip on the sticks when they play. Drumming gloves often have a textured grip surface made of a synthetic or rubber material and mesh or vents on the parts of the glove not used to hold sticks, to ventilate perspiration. Some drummers wear gloves to prevent blisters.

=== Drum screen ===
In some styles or settings—such as country music clubs or churches, small venues, or when a live recording is being made—the drummer may use a transparent Perspex or Plexiglas drum screen (also known as a drum shield) to dampen the onstage volume of the drums. A screen that completely surrounds the drum kit is known as a drum booth. In live sound applications, drum shields are used so that the audio engineer can have more control over the volume of drums that the audience hears through the PA system mix, or to reduce the overall volume of the drums, as a way to reduce the overall volume of the band. In some recording studios, foam and fabric baffles are used in addition to, or in place of, clear panels. The drawback with foam/cloth baffle panels is that the drummer cannot see other performers, the record producer, or the audio engineer very well.

=== Carpets ===
Drummers often bring a carpet, mats, or rugs to venues to prevent the bass drum and hi-hat stand from "crawling" (moving away) on a slippery surface, which can be caused by the drum head striking the bass drum. The carpet also reduces short reverberations (which is generally but not always an advantage), and helps to prevent damage to the flooring or floor coverings. In shows where multiple drummers will bring their kits onstage over the night, it is common for drummers to mark the location of their stands and pedals with tape, to allow for quicker positioning of a kit to a drummer's accustomed position. Bass drums and hi-hat stands commonly have retractable spikes, to help them grip surfaces such as carpet, or rubber feet, to remain stationary on hard surfaces.

=== Practice equipment ===
Drummers use a variety of accessories when practicing. Metronomes and beat counters are used to develop a sense of a steady beat. Drum muffling pads may be used to lessen the volume of drums during practicing. A practice pad, held on the lap, on a leg, or mounted on a stand, is used for near-silent practice with drumsticks. A set of practice pads mounted to simulate an entire drum kit is known as a practice kit. In the 2010s, these have largely been superseded by electronic drums, which can be listened to with headphones for quiet practice and by kits with non-sounding mesh heads.

=== Tuning equipment ===
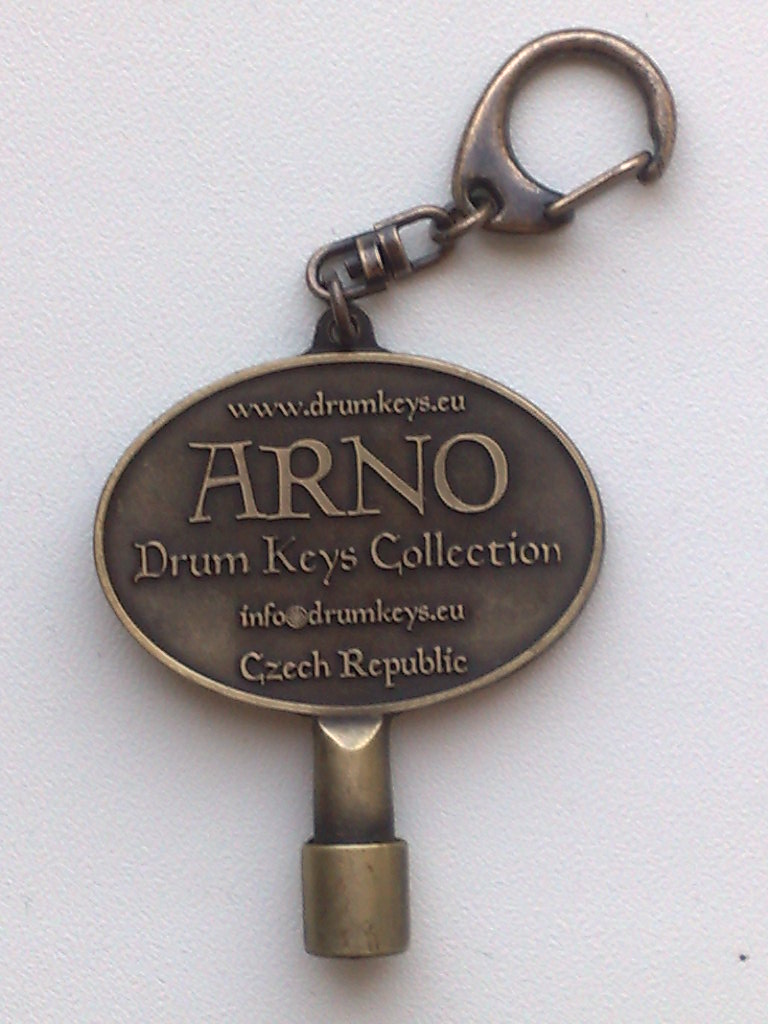
An Arno drum key.

Drummers use a drum key for tuning their drums and adjusting some drum hardware. Besides the basic type of drum key (a T-handled wrench) there are various tuning wrenches and tools. Basic drum keys are divided into three types which allows for tuning of three types of tuning screws on drums: square (most used), slotted, and hexagonal. Ratchet-type wrenches allow high-tension drums to be tuned easily. Spin keys (utilizing a ball joint) allow for rapid head changing. Torque-wrench keys are available, graphically revealing the torque given to each lug. Also, tension gauges, or meters, which are set on the head, aid drummers to achieve a consistent tuning. Drummers can tune drums "by ear" or use a digital drum tuner, which "measures tympanic pressure" on the drumhead to provide accurate tuning.

=== Notation and improvisation ===
The basic common time groove with bass (bottom), back beat snare, and cymbal (top) is common in popular music.

Drum kit music is either written in music notation (called "drum parts"), learned and played by ear, improvised, or some combination of any of all three of these methods. Professional session musician drummers and big-band drummers are often required to read drum parts. Drum parts are most commonly written on a standard five-line staff. A special percussion clef is commonly used, while previously the bass clef was used. However, even if the bass, or no, clef is used, each line and space is assigned an instrument in the kit, rather than a pitch. Drum notation was never completely standardised, so often a 'key' or 'legend' is provided at the beginning of a book or piece. In jazz, traditional music, folk music, rock music, and pop music, drummers are expected to be able to learn songs by ear (from a recording or from another musician who is playing or singing the song) and improvise. The degree of improvisation differs among different styles. Jazz and jazz fusion drummers may have lengthy improvised solos in every song. In rock music and blues, there are also drum solos in some songs, although they tend to be shorter than those in jazz. Drummers in all popular music and traditional music styles are expected to be able to improvise accompaniment parts to songs, once they are told the genre or style (e.g., shuffle, ballad, blues).

=== Recording ===
On early recording media (until 1925), such as wax cylinders and discs carved with an engraving needle, sound balancing meant that musicians had to be moved back in the room. Drums were often put far from the horn (part of the mechanical transducer) to reduce sound distortion.

In the 2020s, drum parts in many popular music styles are often recorded apart from the other instruments and singers, using multitrack recording techniques. Once the drums are recorded, the other instruments (rhythm guitar, piano, etc.), and then vocals, are added. To ensure that the drum tempo is consistent at this type of recording, the drummer usually plays along with a click track (a type of digital metronome) in headphones. The ability to play accurately along with a click track has become an important skill for professional drummers.

== Drum manufacturers ==
Manufacturers using the American traditional format in their catalogs include these:

- ddrum
- Camco
- Drum Workshop
- Gretsch Drums
- Ludwig Drums
- Slingerland Drum Company
- Tama Drums

Those using the European measures of diameter and depth include these:

- Brady Drum Company
- Mapex Drums
- Meinl Percussion
- Pearl Drums
- Premier Percussion
- Rogers Drums
- Sonor
- Yamaha Drums

== See also ==
=== People ===
- Drummer
- List of drummers

=== Styles and techniques ===
- Drum beat
- Jazz drumming

=== Other ===
- Drum kit tuning
- Drum machine
- Electronic drum
- Percussion instrument
- Rhythm section
