= Cymbal pack =

Set of cymbals sold together for use in a drum kit

A cymbal pack is a set of cymbals sold together for use in a drum kit.

Cymbal packs are all to some degree matched, but the level of this matching varies from simply being of compatible models to the individual cymbals having been hand selected to blend well.

There are three common configurations:

- The most common pack is a starter pack consisting of four cymbals: A 20" ride, a 16" crash and a pair of 14" hi-hats. A second crash or a 10" splash is sometimes added as a promotional bonus.
- Less common is a three cymbal starter pack consisting of an 18" crash/ride or 16" crash plus a pair of 13" or 14" hi-hats. This may be a more suitable starter pack for a three- or even four-piece kit.
- Some makers produce extension packs to add two effects cymbals to a starter pack, most commonly a 10" splash and an 18" china, or less commonly a second crash cymbal plus one effects cymbal.
