= Zinger cymbal =

A zinger cymbal is a small Turkish cymbal attached to a bass drum in a drum kit. The cymbal is hit with the bass drum beater (often activated by a pedal) and produces sound at the same time as the bass drum.

More common in early jazz music, the zinger cymbal is hardly used in modern drumming.
