= Crash/ride cymbal =

Cymbal capable of both crash and ride purposes

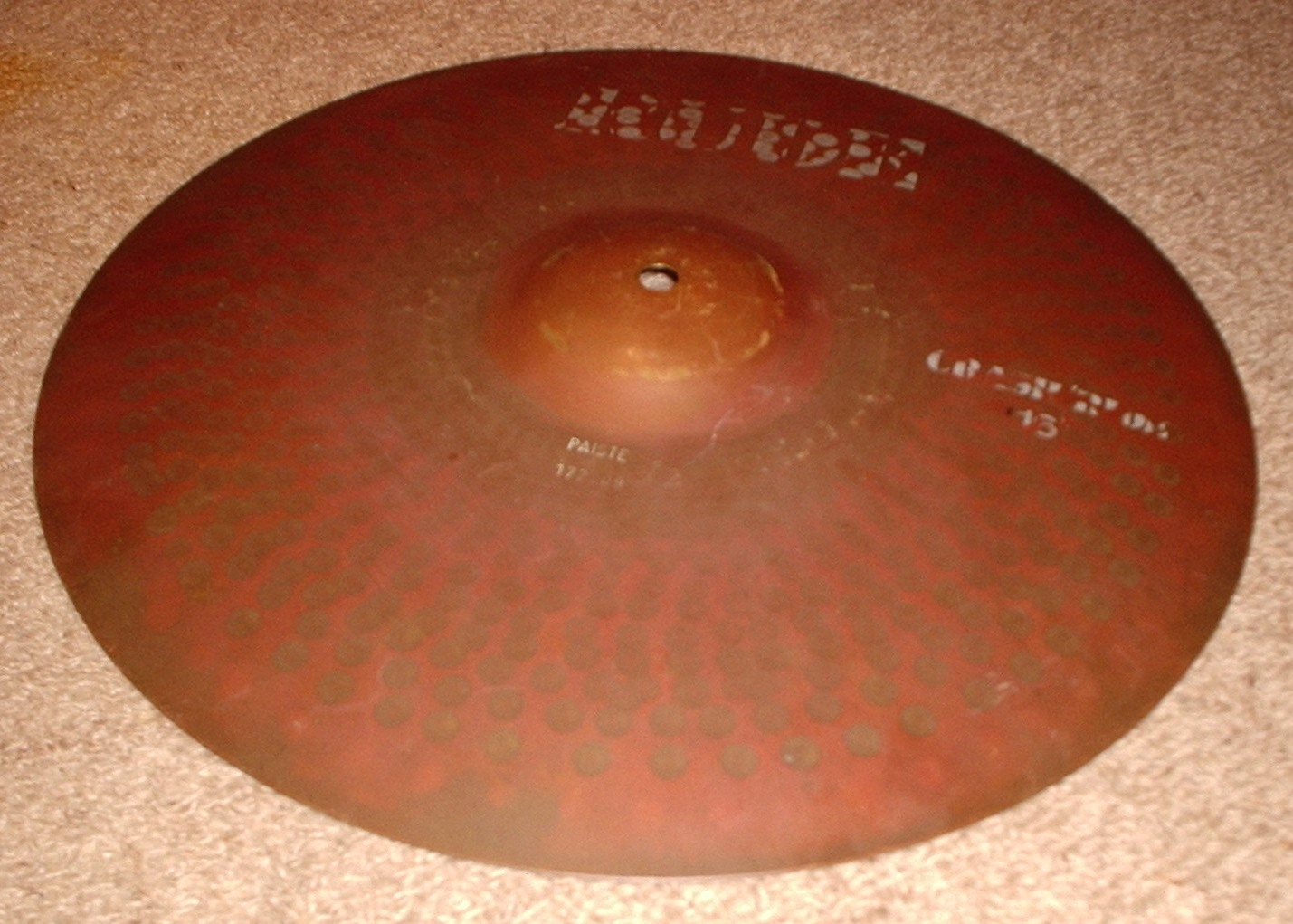
Paiste Rude 16" crash/ride

A crash/ride cymbal is a medium weight, slightly tapered cymbal, normally in the 18–22-inch (460–560 mm) range, designed to serve in a drum kit as both a crash and a ride cymbal.

A ride/crash cymbal may be thought to be the same thing, but is actually different. Despite being similar in design and function to a crash/ride, it is slightly heavier and/or less tapered to optimise the ride rather than the crash function. It is far less common than the crash/ride.

Crash/ride and ride/crash cymbals have several uses:

- In a very small kit, one may be the only suspended cymbal, used as both crash and ride.
  - Some beginners' cymbal packs have only three cymbals: A pair of hi-hats, and a crash/ride. However most cymbal packs even at entry level have separate ride and crash cymbals, and the drum hardware packs sold with most drum kits include stands for two suspended cymbals.
  - Many early drum kits had only one tom and one cymbal, both mounted on the bass drum. This cymbal would nowadays be called a crash/ride; At the time it would simply have been called a medium, if anything.
- In a large kit, they bridge the gap between the largest crash cymbal and the smallest ride.
- At very soft volumes, one will provide a more conventional ride tone than a full-sized ride cymbal.
- At very loud volumes, they provide fuller and longer crashes than conventional crash cymbals, which may sound for too short a time.

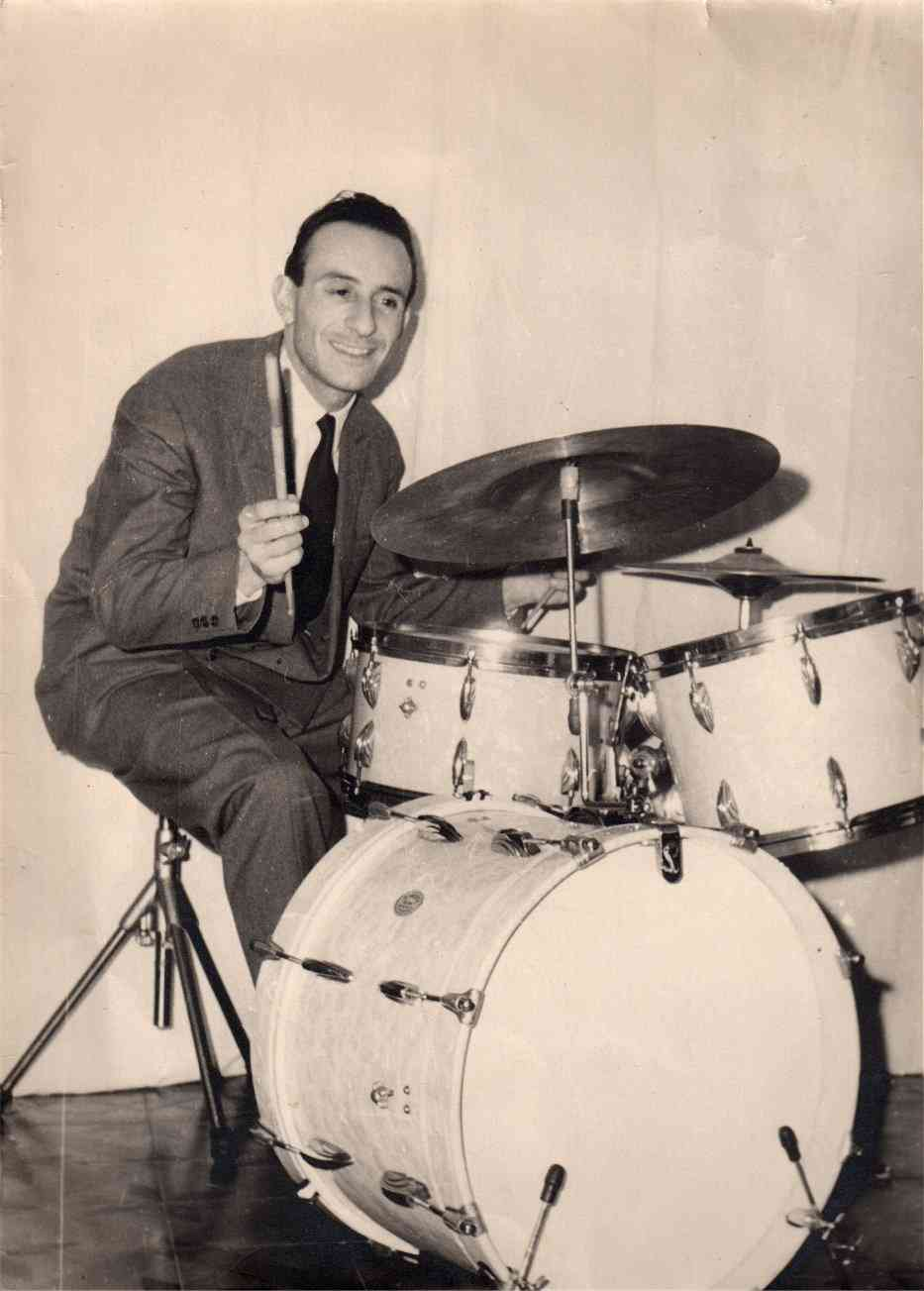
Three-piece kit with one suspended cymbal, 1959
