= Moongel =

Type of drum dampener

Moongel is a translucent blue, sticky, gel-like substance produced by the drum practice products company RTOM. It has been incorporated into several products and come in packs of four or six which can applied to a drumhead or cymbal to diminish the higher overtones. It also has become a popular studio technique due to its damping properties. Therefore, it allows for drummers to get a "punchier" sound of out their toms.

RTOM also makes Moongel Workout Pads, which are practice pads that are available in 7" and 14" diameter sizes. The manufacturer claims that unlike most practice pads they allow no "free rebounds", which is said to accelerate muscle development.

Moongels are made from 53% PVC copolymer resin, 27% Dioctyl Terephthalate, 2.5% Epoxied Soybean Oil, 3% Calcium-Zinc Stabilizers, 7% PVC-based Thixotrope and 7.5% Adipate Plasticizer-based Thixotrope. Gel of this composition is commercially available from WRS SportsMed, a division of WRS Group, Inc. under the UltraSoft™ trademark.
