= Gong bass drum =

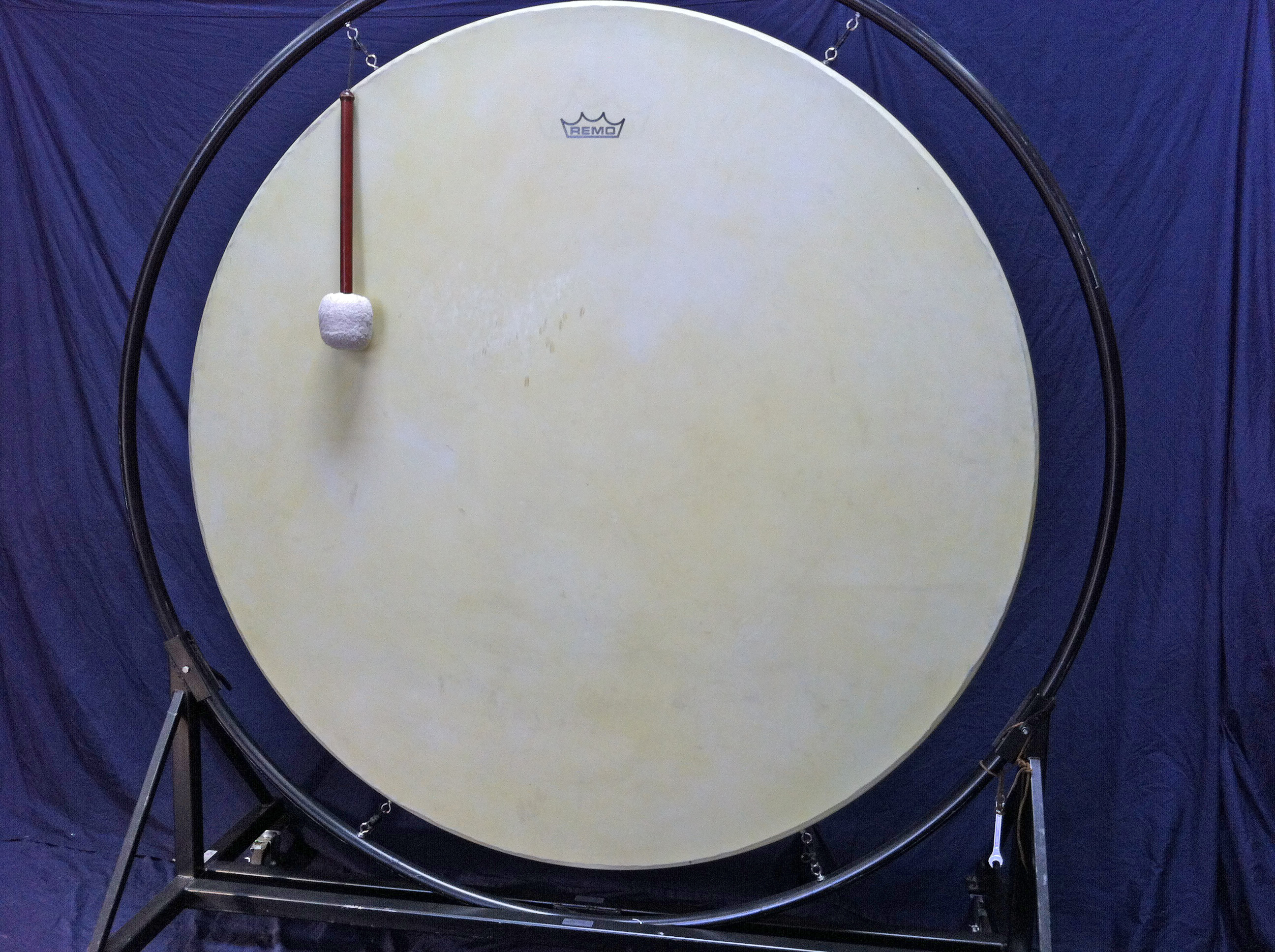
- Gong drum (from Emil Richards Collection)
- Other names: Gong drum
- Classification: Percussion instrument (Membranophone)

Builders
- Tama, DW, Pearl, Remo

A gong bass drum (or simply gong drum) is a musical instrument in the percussion family. It is a type of drum that uses a single large drumhead in order to create a loud, resonant sound when struck. The head can be tuned as loose as possible to avoid any sense of pitch in the sound, or tensioned more tightly to produce timpani-like tones.

== Gong drum in recordings ==
Gong bass drums were first produced by Tama in the late 1970s, and have since been used by artists such as Peter Criss of Kiss, Billy Cobham, Neil Peart of Rush, Stewart Copeland of The Police, Tim Alexander of Primus, Mike Portnoy of Dream Theater, Simon Phillips of Toto, David Silveria of KoRn, Aaron Gillespie of Underøath, Dominic Howard of Muse, Zac Farro of Paramore, Budgie of Siouxsie and the Banshees. Pearl's similar suspended bass drums have been used by Chris Slade formerly of AC/DC, Todd Sucherman of Styx, and Joey Jordison of Slipknot. Spaun and Drum Workshop also offer their own versions of gong bass drums.

Gong bass drums are usually relatively large, and are most frequently found in 20" and custom ordered 22" diameters. Orchestral versions can be 28" standard, but there are special larger ones (see below). They are often mounted on legs (much like that of a floor tom), 'rollaway' stands or ordinary tom stands/arms (though usually a pair are used for stability).
