= Effects cymbal =

Type of cymbal for special accents or effects

Effects cymbals are a diverse category of cymbals designed to bring unique texture, color, and character to your drum kit. This group includes chinas, stacks, and other unconventional types that deliver distinctive, often unpredictable sounds—from sharp and bright to dark and trashy. Perfect for adding punchy accents, highlighting rhythms, or exploring experimental tones, effects cymbals are essential tools for drummers looking to expand their sonic palette.

This classification is widely accepted but enigmatic. When pang and swish cymbals are used as ride cymbals they are not considered effects cymbals, despite their exotic tone. On the other hand, the most common six-piece cymbal setup consists of hi-hats, ride cymbal, two crash cymbals of slightly different sizes and possibly weights, one splash and one china type, so effects cymbals must be considered a standard part of an extended drum kit.

== Varieties ==
=== Splash cymbals ===
Splash Cymbals range from 6" - 12". Traditional splash cymbals are relatively quiet and don't last for long, but have a high pitch sound.

=== China cymbals ===
China Cymbals range from 12" - 26". They are one of the loudest cymbals for the drum kit. Where you hit the china makes a huge difference to its sound. They are basically a smaller version of a Chinese gong (where its name originates from). China cymbals can be used up-side down to produce a 'cleaner' noise. When used the right way up, china cymbals produce more 'attack.'

=== Others ===
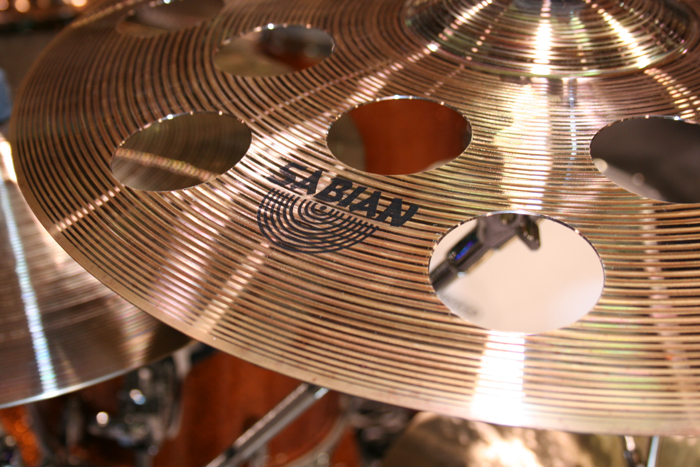
Sabian O-zone vented crash cymbal

There are many other custom effect cymbals, in great variety from different makers.

Drumbal cymbals are designed to rest on the top skin of a snare drum to modify its tone.

Rocktagon cymbals by Sabian are a unique eight-sided design, midway between a crash and a china.
