= Practice pad =

Percussion tool used for practice

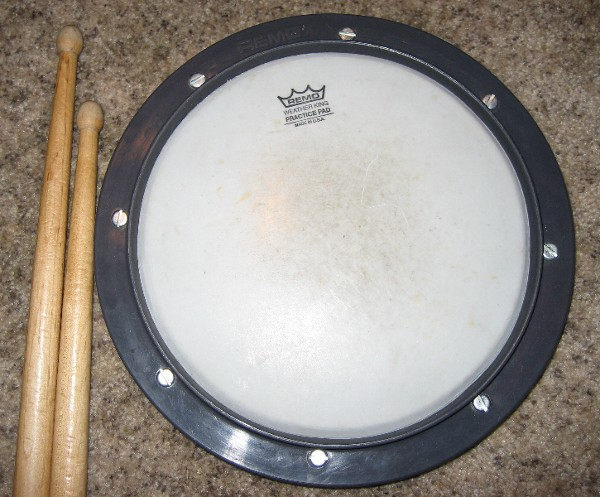
Remo WeatherKing RT series practice pad

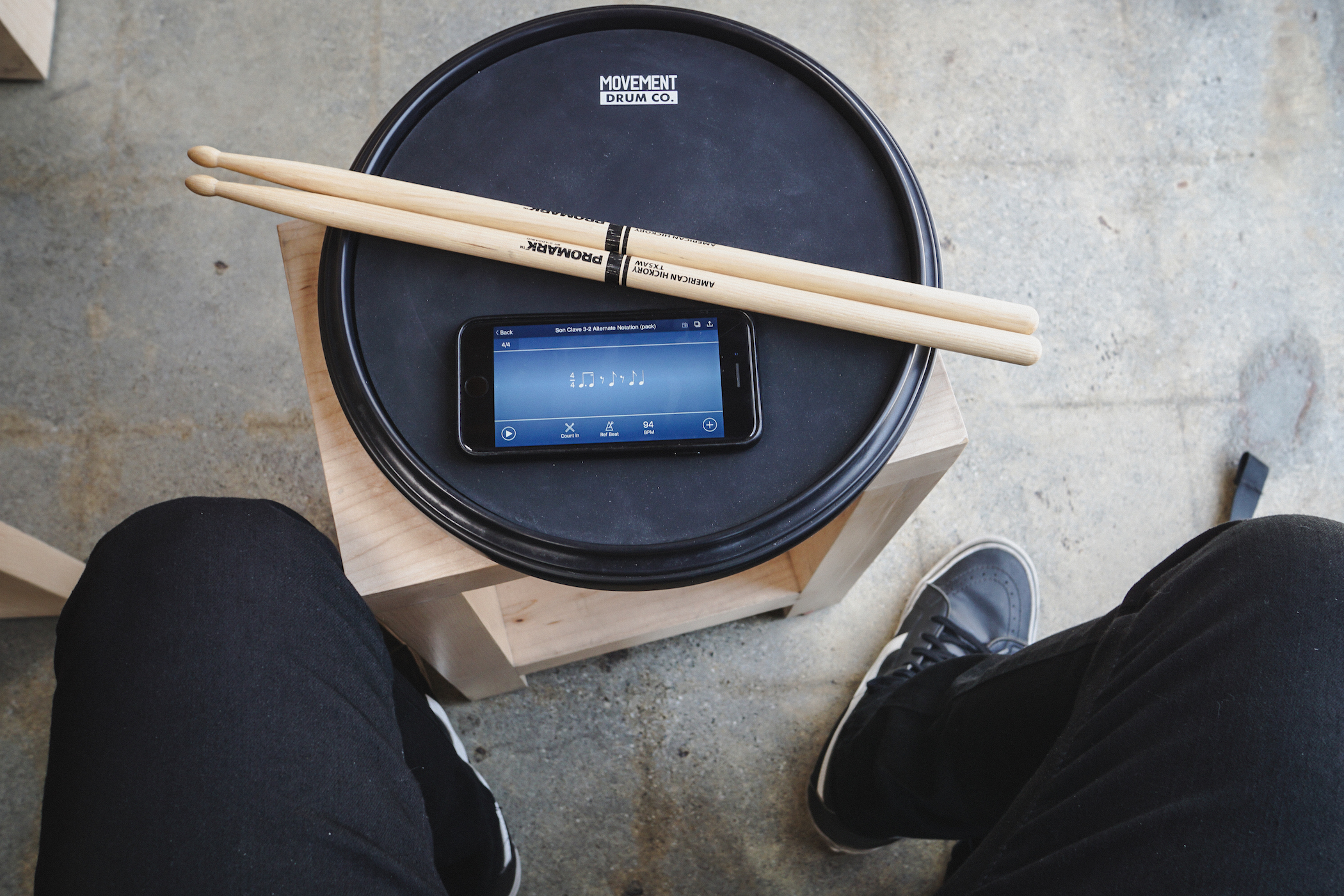
A Movement Drum Co. 4-in-1 Pad being used with a metronome

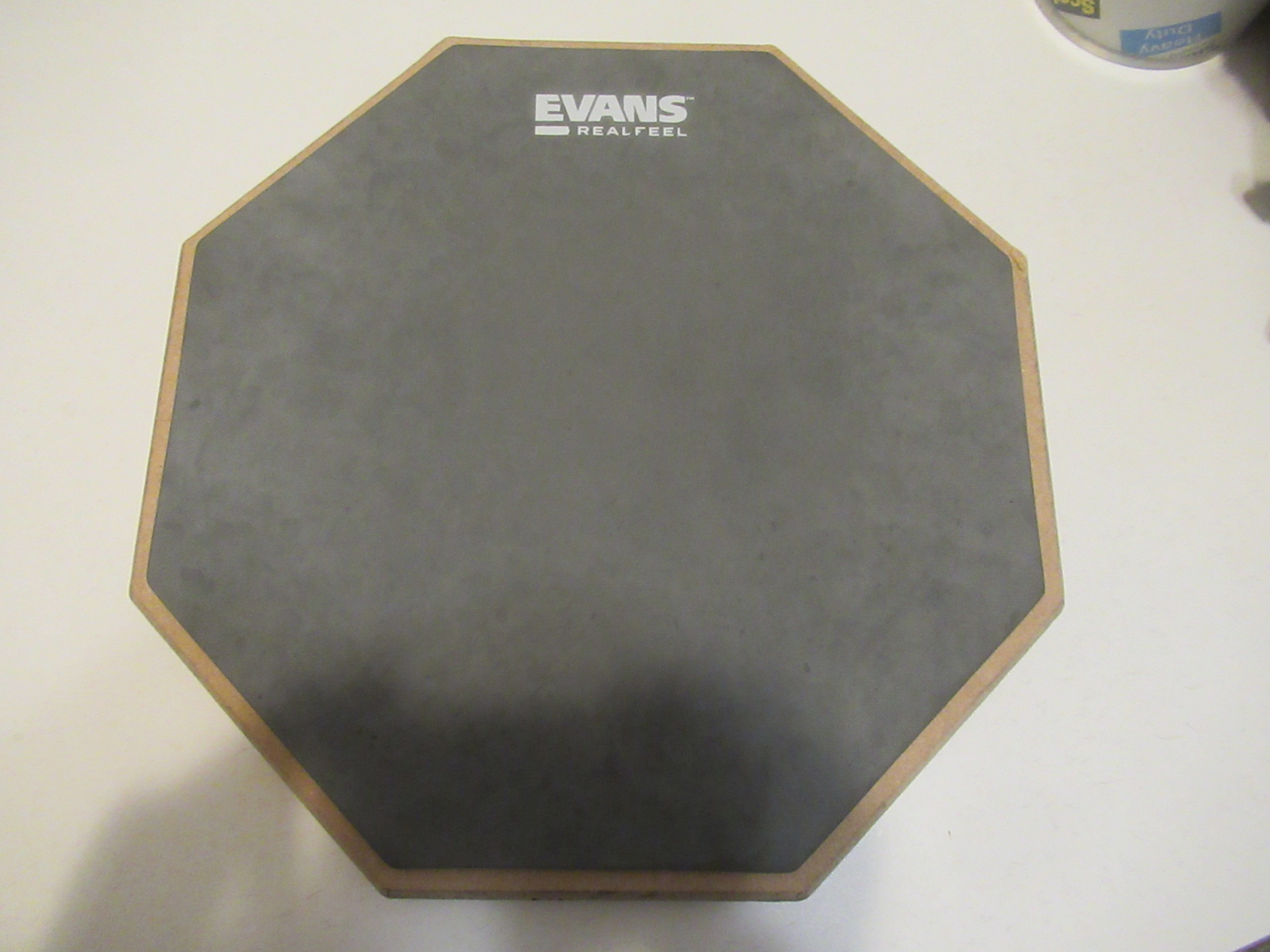
Evans RealFeel practice pad.

A practice pad or drum pad, is a piece of equipment used by drummers and other percussionists to practice quietly, or to warm up before a performance.

== Construction ==
A variety of practice pads have been developed to assist percussionists in different ways. Practice pads may be designed to approximate the tension and response of a true drumhead when struck, or to provide less rebound to train the percussionist’s muscles. They can be constructed in a variety of shapes and sizes, and are typically small and light enough to be easily portable. Many variations include harder or softer playing surfaces, non-skid bases (that can also double as muted playing surfaces), and fixing points allowing the pad to be connected to existing percussion hardware such as a cymbal or snare drum stand.

=== Mylar ===
Some practice pads use a disk of mylar, or another material used in the construction of true drumheads, stretched over a substrate such as foam or rubber. These elements are fixed together by a rim of metal or plastic.

=== Elastomer ===
Many other devices use a thin layer of elastomer, such as natural or synthetic rubber of various densities, as a playing surface. This type of rubber surface is either placed directly over the top of an existing drumhead, or stuck to the top of a solid substrate. The rubber is designed to reflect a drumstick or mallet after being struck in a way similar to that of a true drumhead.

=== Mesh ===
Some practice pads use a disk of mesh stretched over a frame. The mesh is quieter when struck than rubber or mylar, and can be tuned to mimic different types of drum head by tightening and loosening it in the frame.

== Use ==
These devices can be placed on a wide variety of surfaces including the player’s lap, a tabletop or the head of an actual drum. Placing the pad on the head of an actual drum can have the effect of transferring to the drum’s natural snare-side response along with severely muting the sound of the drum. Several units are often arranged like a standard drum kit for practice purposes.

== See also ==
- Electronic drum
- Practice (learning method)
- Rehearsal
