= China cymbal =

Type of crash cymbal

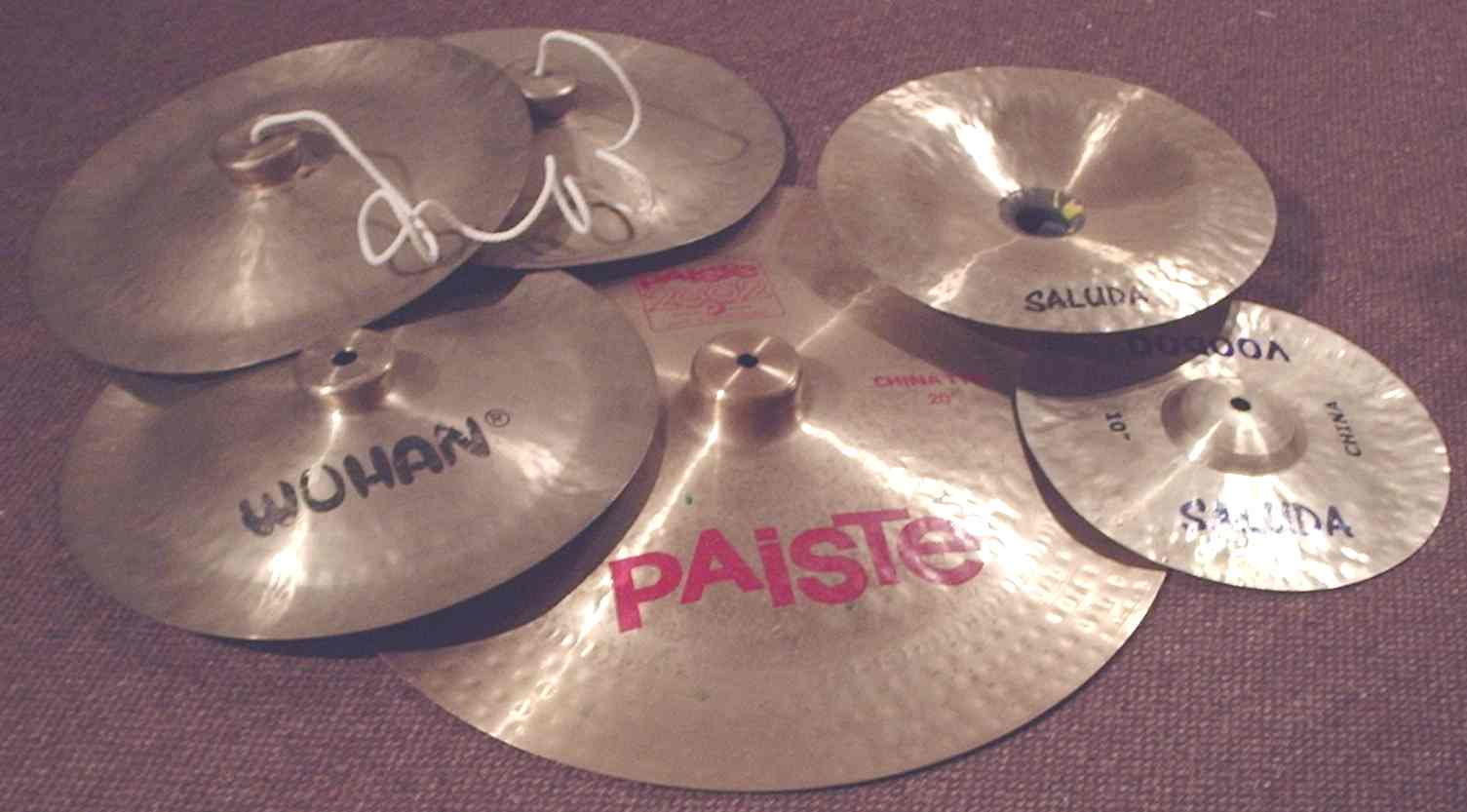
China type cymbals from three continents

Sound of Chinese cymbal

In western music, a China cymbal (or Chinese cymbal) is a distinct type of cymbal designed to produce a bright, crisp, and explosive tone that has brought it the nickname trash cymbal. The name "China cymbal" comes from its shape, which is similar to that of the Chinese Bo. China-type cymbals were first brought to the United States and Europe from China in the early 20th century. Such cymbals are most frequently mounted upside down on cymbal stands, allowing for them to be more easily struck and for a better sound.

China-type cymbals are common in various kinds of rock music, particularly heavy metal and thrash metal. They are also frequently used in jazz fusion, Latin music, and Brazilian music, especially in arrangements with elaborate drum solos. In Latin and some other music styles, China cymbals are usually played in conjunction with other percussion instruments instead of a drum kit, such as timbales, octobans, or the surdo. China cymbals may also be used for conventional jazz, often played with mallets or brushes to achieve a softer sound resembling that of a "dark crash" cymbal.

Occasionally these cymbals are featured in orchestral works; examples using a suspended cymbal include Olivier Messiaen's Turangalîla-Symphonie and Edgard Varèse's Ionisation.

== Anatomy ==
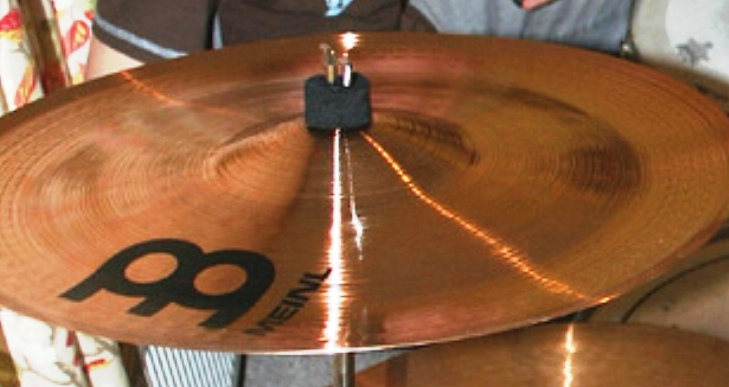
Meinl china type: Conventional bell, upturned rim; here mounted bell up.

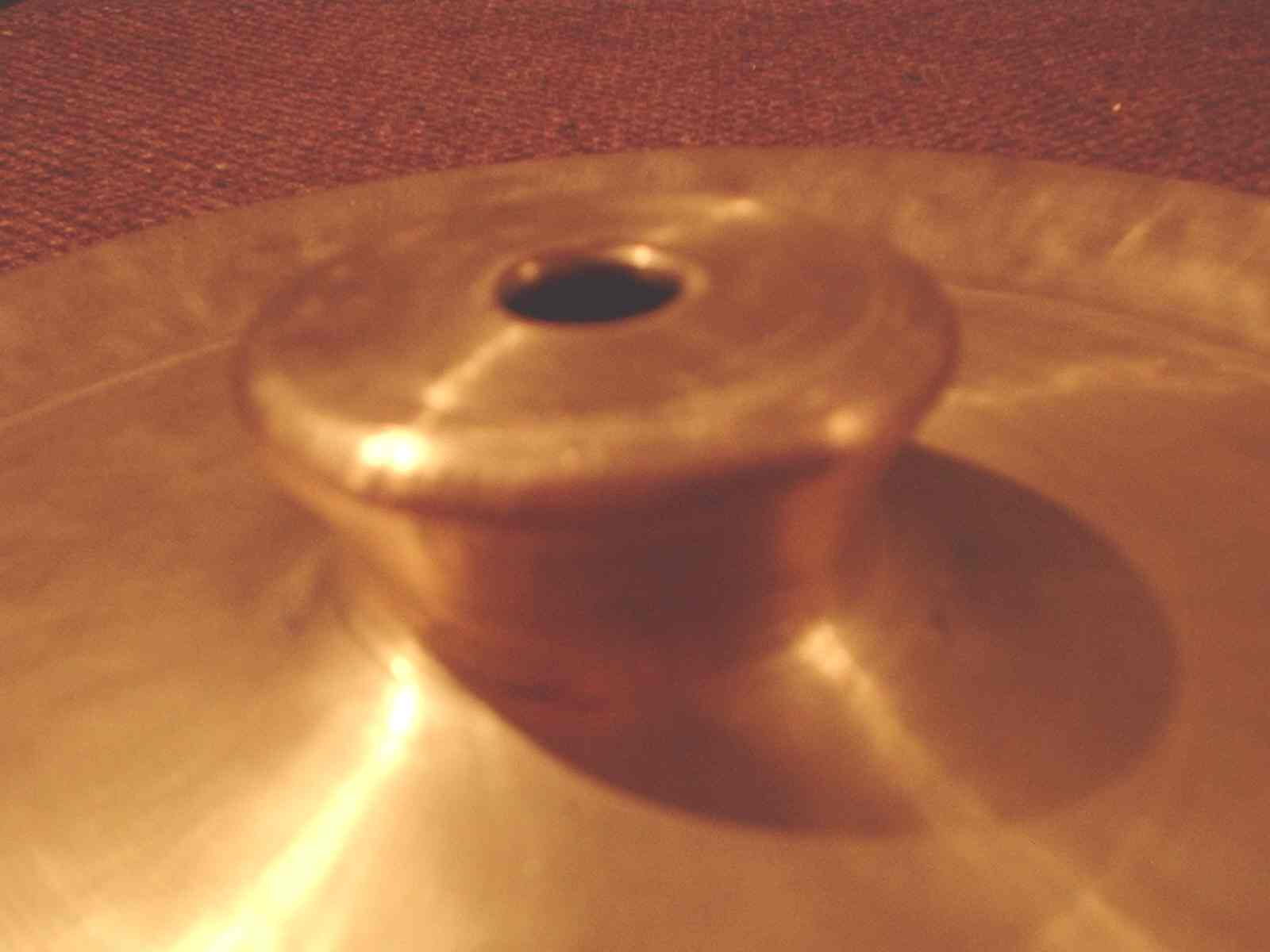
Detail of a conical bell.

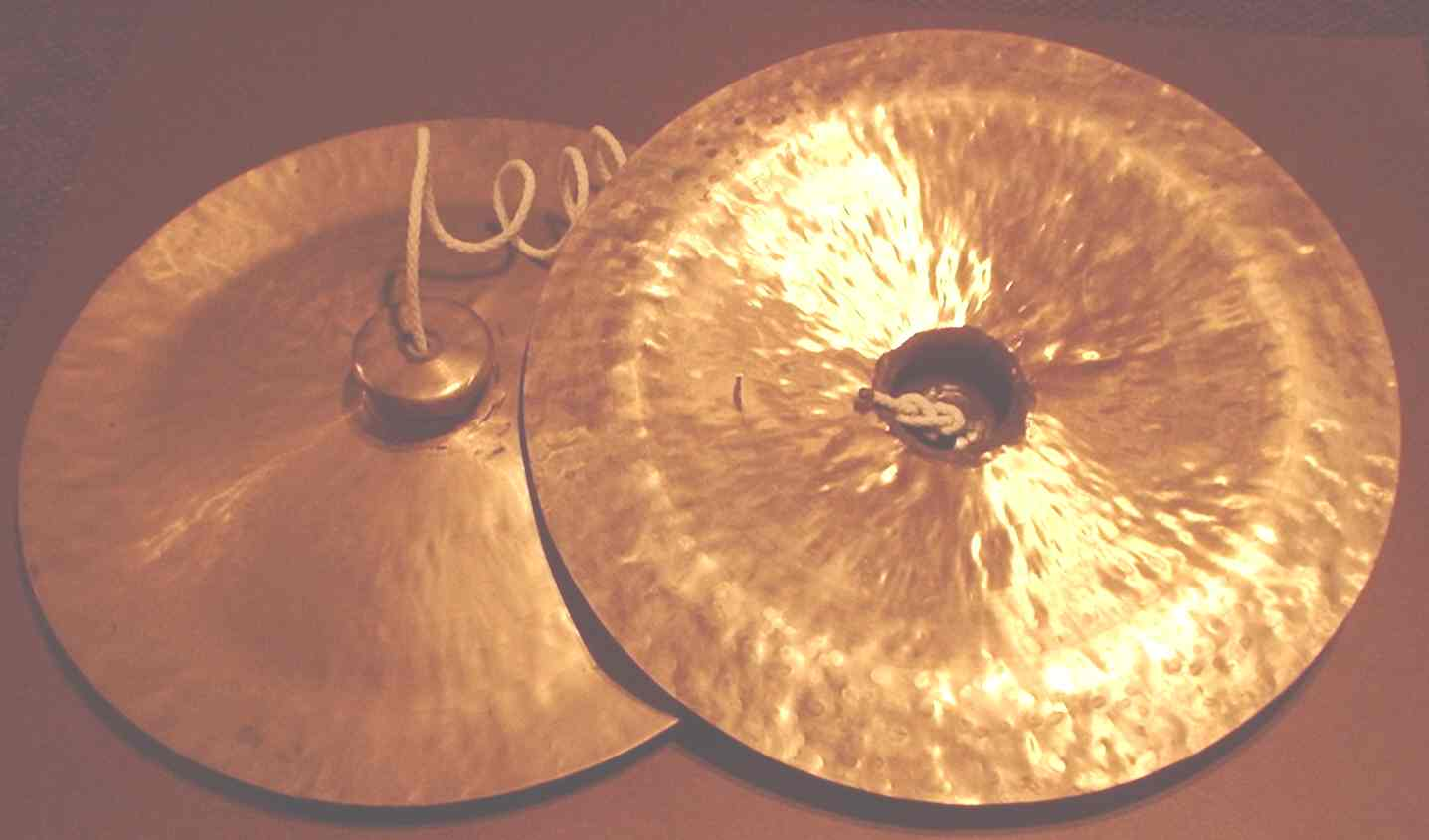
China clash cymbals

China type cymbals typically have a bell that is cylindrical or shaped like a truncated cone with its base the top of the bell, an outer rim that is turned up in the reverse direction to the main bow of the cymbal, little or no taper (change in thickness) from bell to rim, and an area including the inside of the bell that is unpolished. However, many china type cymbals have only several or in some cases none of these distinguishing characteristics. The distinguishing feature of a china type cymbal is the one that is hardest to define: its sound. China cymbals are those whose sounds are derived from the Chinese, rather than the Turkish, tradition of cymbal making.

Cymbals are classified into two or three tonal families: Turkish; Chinese; and some would say European, although others would include the European family of tones as a development of the Turkish sounds. The best Turkish (and European) cymbals have a rich, swelling tone that some describe as "sweet". To western ears, the best china types have an abrasive, cutting sound that is described by western drummers as "trashy".

The families do to some extent overlap. Notably, pang and swish cymbals have some characteristics of china types, and some characteristics of traditional Turkish cymbals. On the other hand, the Sabian rocktagon cymbals, and some Ufip models, are considered china types while having none of the physical characteristics of the normal china type, while the Paiste crystal crash is considered a European cymbal despite its squarish bell.

Cymbal making in China is claimed to predate the development of the art anywhere else in the world. The most universally acclaimed cymbal alloy, bell bronze, appears to have been independently developed in China. Today in China a wide range of cymbals are manufactured of both traditional and imported patterns. Traditional Chinese types with distinctive names and sounds include chung, jing, and water cymbals, as well as many other types. In Western music these are all referred to as china type cymbals.

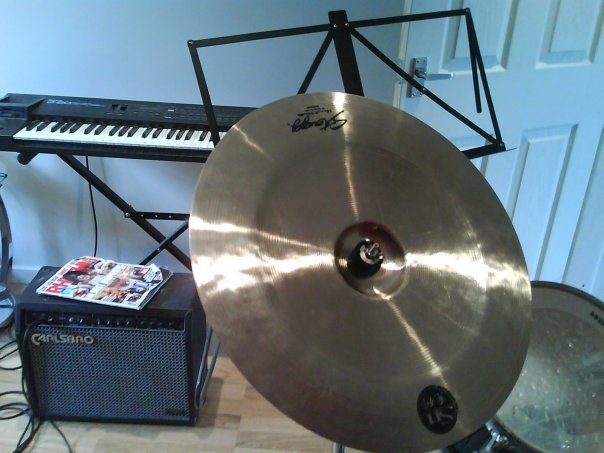
16 inches (410 mm) Stagg SH China Cymbal with bell down

China type cymbals are available in a wide range of sizes from 27 inches (69 cm) down to 8 inches (20 cm), most types singly but some in pairs. Those of 12 inches (30 cm) or smaller are normally referred to in Western music as china splash cymbals. When used in a drum kit, they are regarded as effects cymbals and are used to give colour and variety.

In a drum kit, china-type cymbals can be mounted either with the bell facing upward (similar to other cymbals) as well as with the bell facing downward. When mounted bell-down, the upturned rim becomes a downturned rim, allowing a normal stick technique to be used for both ride and crash patterns. This assumes that the bell is formed in the typical direction; some china type cymbals (e.g., the Paiste 2002 Novo china) have an inverted bell and an upturned rim, and so must be mounted bell up to achieve this downwards rim orientation.

== Types ==
=== Traditional ===
Conical (termed "square") bell rough finished on the inside; reversed edge.

=== Novo ===
Conventional rounded bell, reversed edge. The bell may be or may not be reversed.

=== Pang and swish ===
The swish and pang are specific sounds within the enormous range of china cymbals, developed as exotic ride cymbals but also used as crashes at higher volumes. Swish refers to large China cymbals with a rounded flange and a mellower sound.

=== China splash ===
A "China splash" cymbal is typically 12 inches (300 mm) or smaller.

Sabian refers to both their 12-and-14-inch (300 and 360 mm) nova Chinese models as mini Chinese.

=== Rocktagon ===
The Rocktagon, a Sabian exclusive, is an octagonal cymbal with a sound midway between a crash and a china. First introduced in the 1980s, it was an early example of a cymbal that blurred the line between the two. The original Rocktagon was a thick, heavy cymbal; Sabian brought it back in 2023 as a thinner 18-inch AAX model, which joined its regular catalog in July 2024. The cymbal is manufactured as round and cut to shape after all-over lathing. Available sizes include 16-inch (41 cm), 18-inch (46 cm), and initially 20-inch (51 cm), as well as 8-inch (20 cm) and 10-inch (25 cm) Rocktagon splash.

== Sticking techniques ==
China cymbals are played in various ways, depending on the genre of music.

For example, in modern metal music, players generally tend to play using the shoulder of the stick rather than the tip for a more "trashy" sound. In other genres, such as jazz (which can use less hammered cymbals for a lighter and less distorted effect), the drummer often plays with the tip for more of a "sizzle" sound.
