= Sizzle cymbal =

Type of cymbal

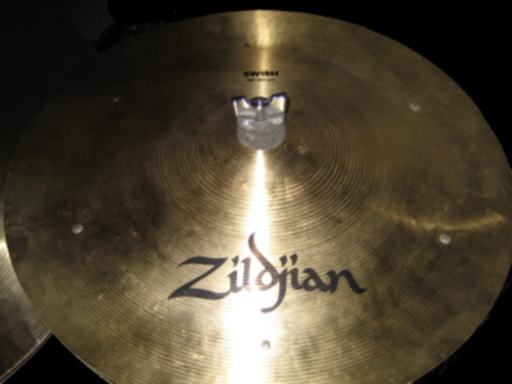
Swish cymbal with six rivets in the traditional pattern

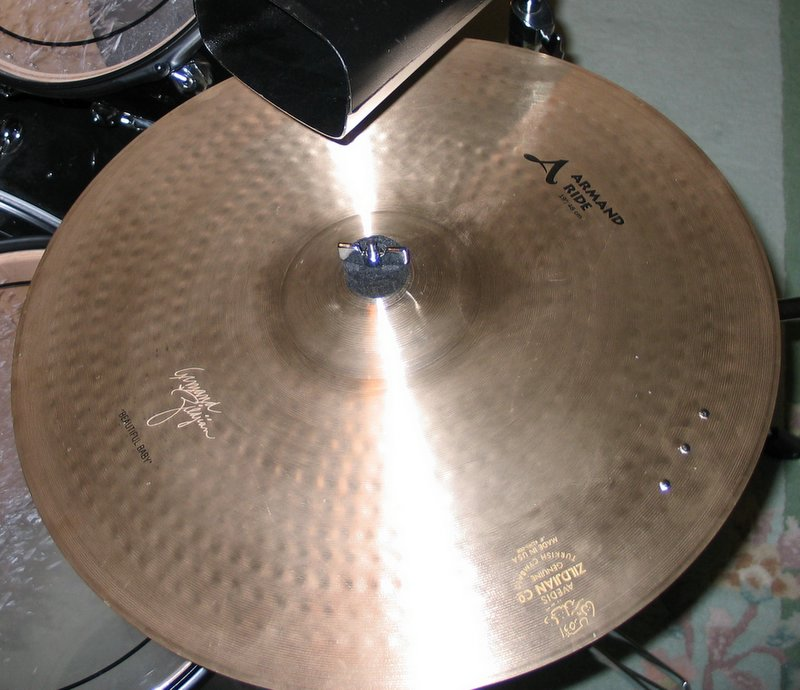
Zildjian 19" Armand Ride with a three-rivet cluster

A sizzle cymbal is a cymbal to which rivets, chains or other rattles have been added to modify the sound, attached either by means of holes bored in the cymbal or by means of an attachment known as a sizzler.

These rattles have two main effects on the tone of the cymbal:

- Most obviously, the sound of the 'wash' of the cymbal is made louder and more penetrating, and is dominated by the sound of the rattles themselves.
- Also important but less obvious, the cymbal loses some of its sustain and dynamic range, because whenever there is insufficient energy left in the cymbal to lift the rattles, the sound cuts out sharply.

Both effects have musical uses, and can also be used to mask unwanted overtones in cymbals of lesser quality. However the best results are still generally obtained with high quality cymbals.

== Uses and patterns ==
The most common form of sizzle cymbal used in a drum kit is a large ride cymbal with a number of rivets loosely fitted but captive in holes spaced evenly around the cymbal close to the rim. This might be called the traditional pattern sizzle cymbal. The loose fit allows the rivets to rattle in the holes. Swish and to a lesser extent pang cymbals with rivets installed in this way were heavily used as main ride cymbals in the swing band era, and the swish is traditionally sold with rivets already fitted. Many early rock music drummers, such as Ringo Starr, used a secondary ride cymbal with rivets, normally a ride cymbal thinner than the main ride and ideally one size larger. This was used for variety, to back a lead break or to give extra tone colour to the whole of faster songs such as "Roll Over Beethoven".

Many other rivet patterns have been tried, but the only one to have gained much following is a single cluster of two or three rivets close together in an arc close and parallel to the rim. This gained popularity in some genres during the late 1980s and early 1990s and was predicted to replace the traditional pattern, but the traditional pattern has remained more popular overall.

Bottom hi-hats, crash cymbals, splash cymbals and even bell splashes have been fitted with rivets. The swish cymbal originally shipped with rivets, and is most commonly used with them to this day.

== Removing rivets ==
If the rivets are removed from a sizzle cymbal its previous tone will be restored, despite the small holes left in the cymbal. Large or numerous holes drilled in a cymbal will make the sound dryer, but ordinary rivet holes make an inaudible difference. Rivet holes may slightly decrease the resale value of a cymbal, but this is not usually the case with vintage cymbals.

== Accessory sizzlers ==
In order to produce a sizzle sound without the need to bore holes in the cymbal, sizzlers may be used. There are two main patterns:

- Rivet sizzlers suspend rivets above the rim of the cymbal, normally in two groups 180 degrees apart.
- Chain sizzlers suspend several short lengths of ball chain on the surface of the cymbal, most often either near the rim or more commonly in many places along a diameter. These chains may be fixed, adjustable in length, or completely removable. Sometimes a single chain of balls from a cabasa is used.

When a sizzle cymbal is required in an orchestra, most often a chain sizzler is used. The positions of the chains can be adjusted allowing finest control and greatest range of tone in the hands of a skilled percussionist. This also allows any cymbal to be used without any permanent effect on its tone.

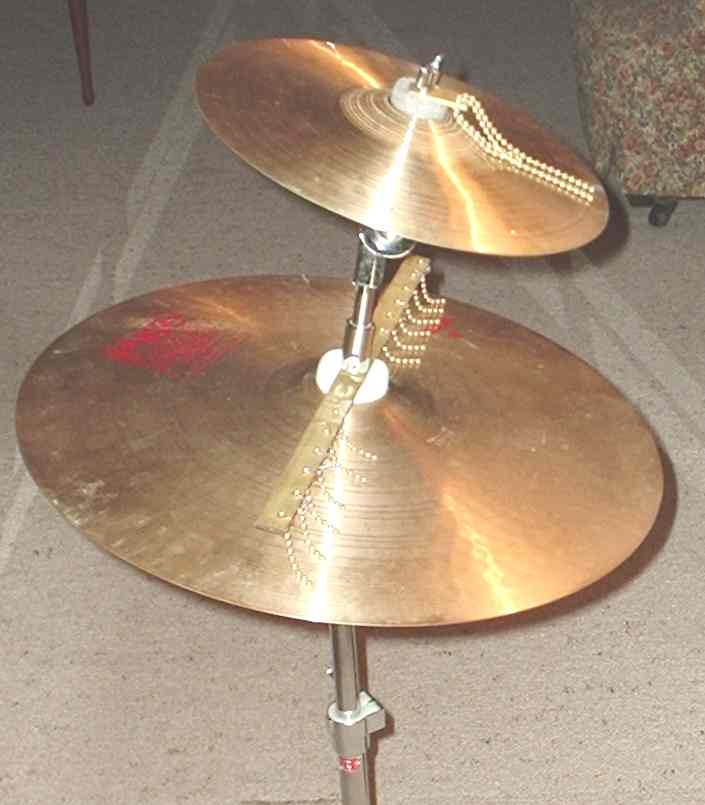
Chain sizzlers mounted on a Paiste 11" trad splash (top) and Paiste 2002 18" medium

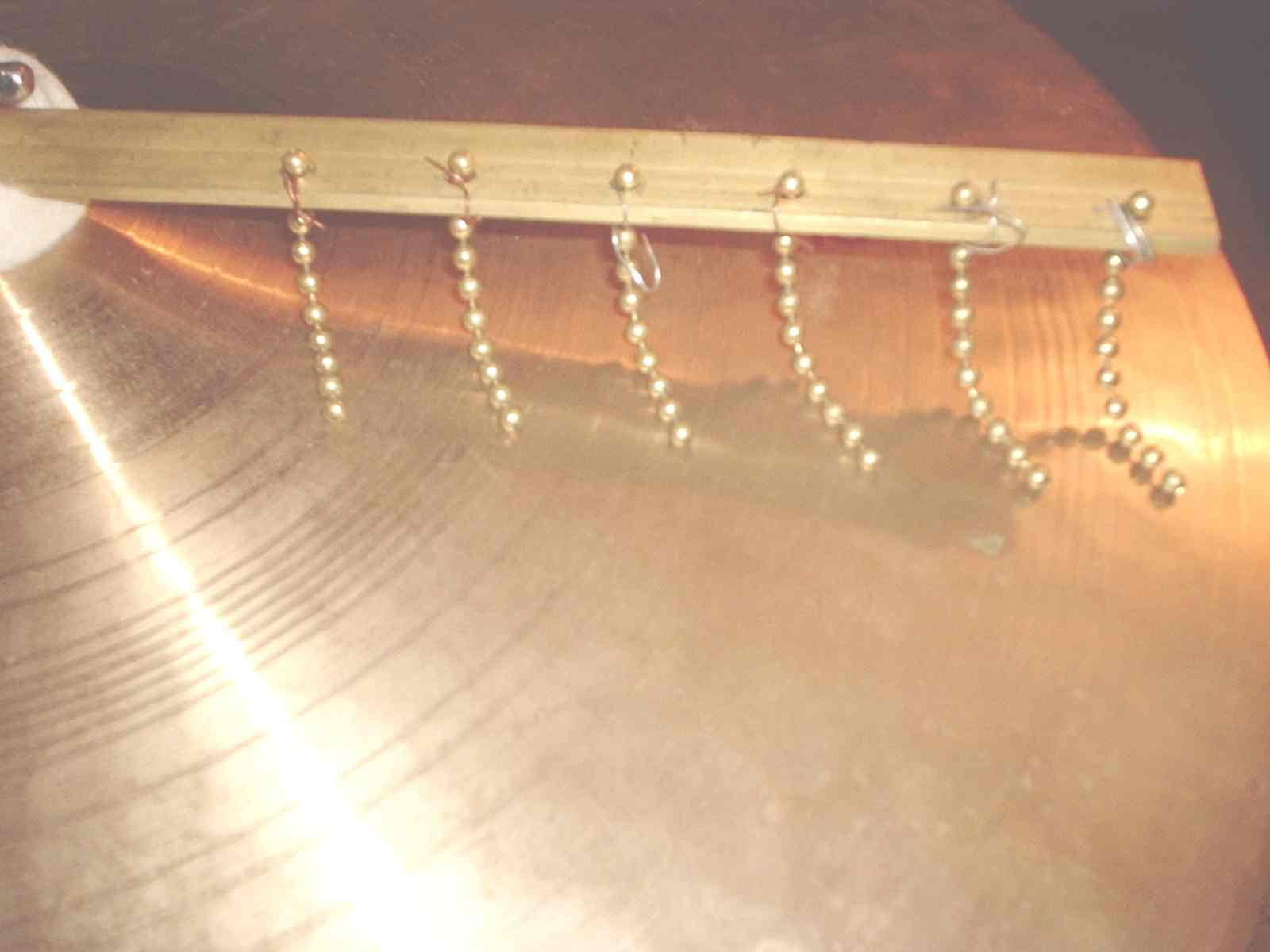
Detail of a Paiste 2002 18" medium cymbal fitted with a chain sizzler

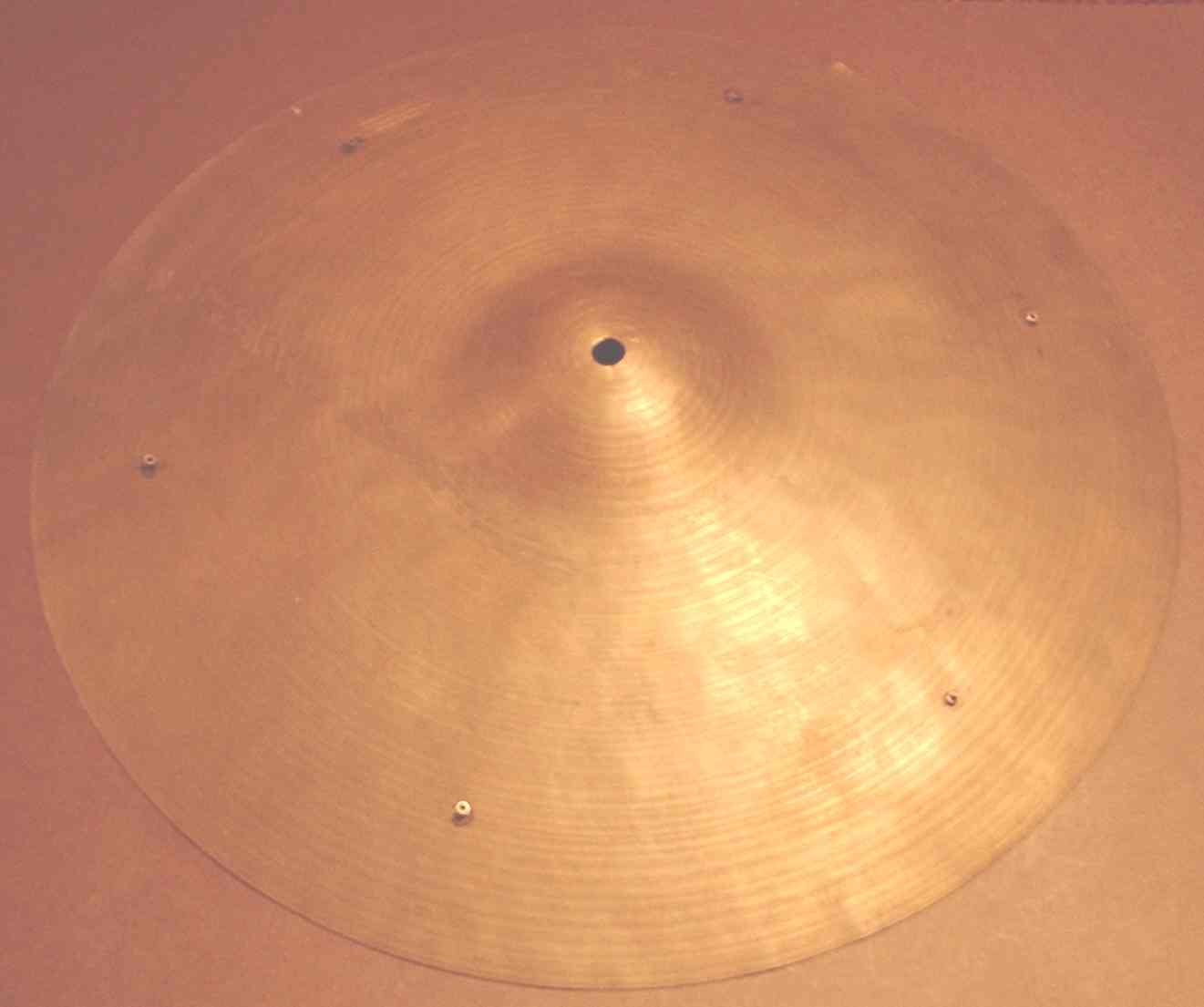
A traditional 18" sizzle cymbal with six equally spaced rivets

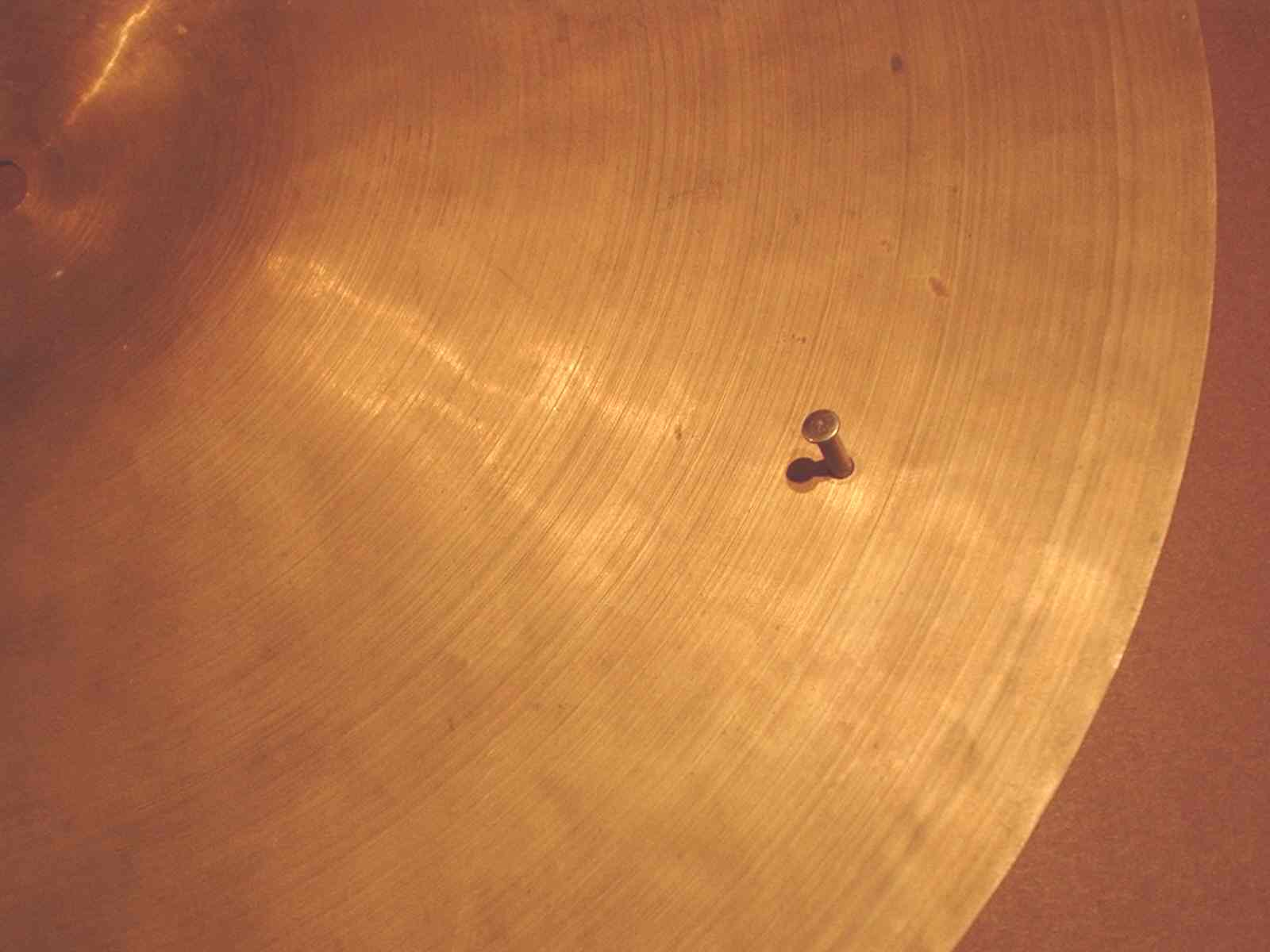
Detail of one rivet

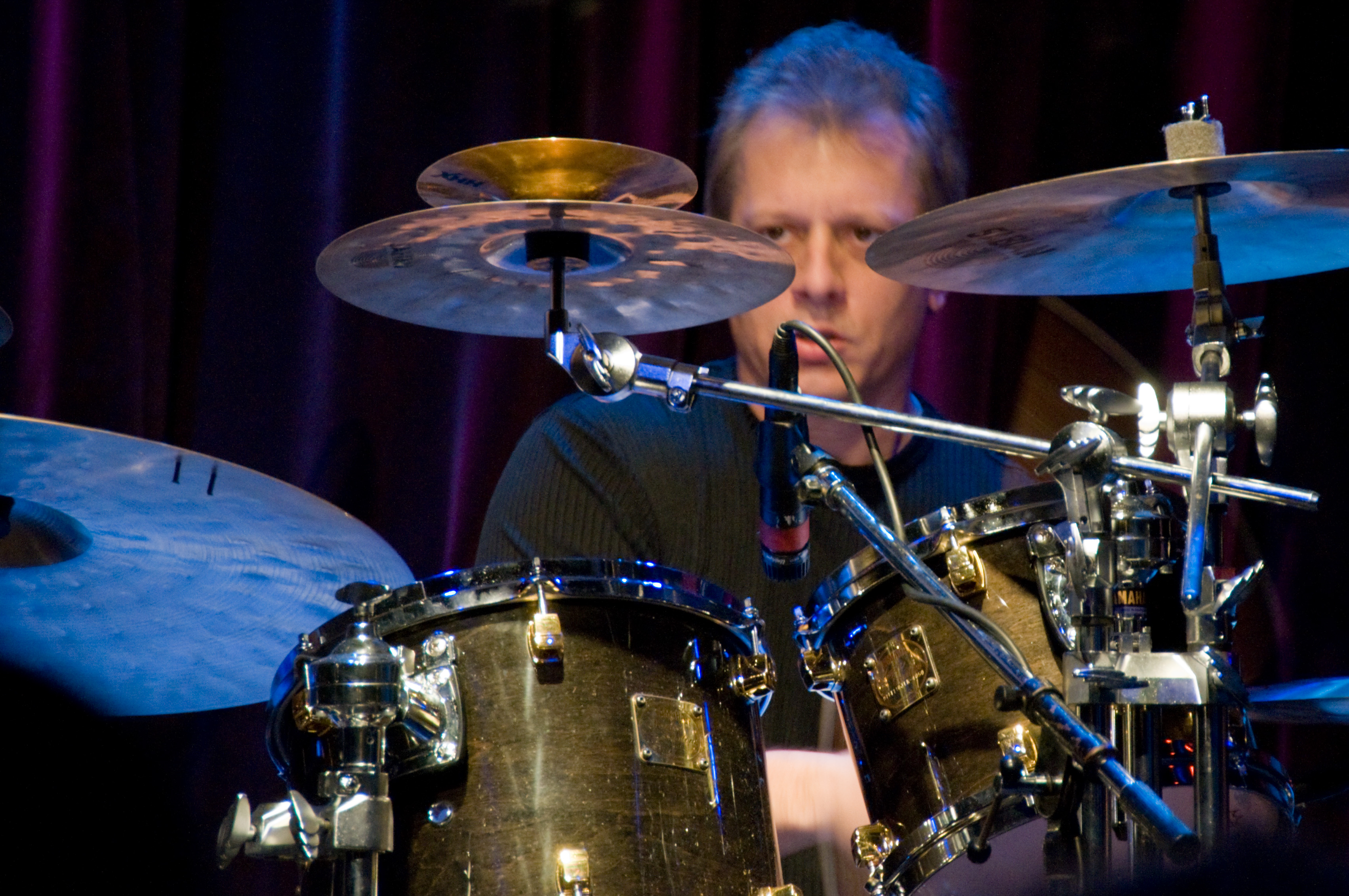
Dave Weckl with a ride fitted with a two rivet cluster
