= Bell cymbal =

Type of cymbal used in a drum kit

A bell cymbal, bell splash cymbal, or ice bell is a small, very thick cymbal with little if any taper, used as an effects cymbal in a drum kit. The sound produced when striking the bell cymbal with a drumstick is a distinctive high-pitched ping sound with a long sustain. Some manufacturers list bell cymbals as a type of splash cymbal, others as a distinct type.

The name bell cymbal is suggestive both of its tone, which is distinctly bell like, and also the earliest examples, which were made by drummers cutting down a larger cymbal (often one damaged at the rim) so that only the bell of the cymbal remained.

Bell cymbals vary greatly in profile. In some, there is no bow at all, the entire cymbal is in the shape of a concave downwards cymbal bell, similar to the earliest examples. Others have the shape of a traditional Turkish cymbal, with a smallish bell in proportion to the size of the cymbal, and still others are intermediate between these two extremes.

Bell cymbals are most commonly six to ten inches in diameter, but larger and smaller examples are found occasionally, down to four inches, and Paiste make one at thirteen inches.

== Cup chime ==
A cup chime is a bell cymbal used as pitched percussion. Sets of cup chimes are used as melodic percussion.

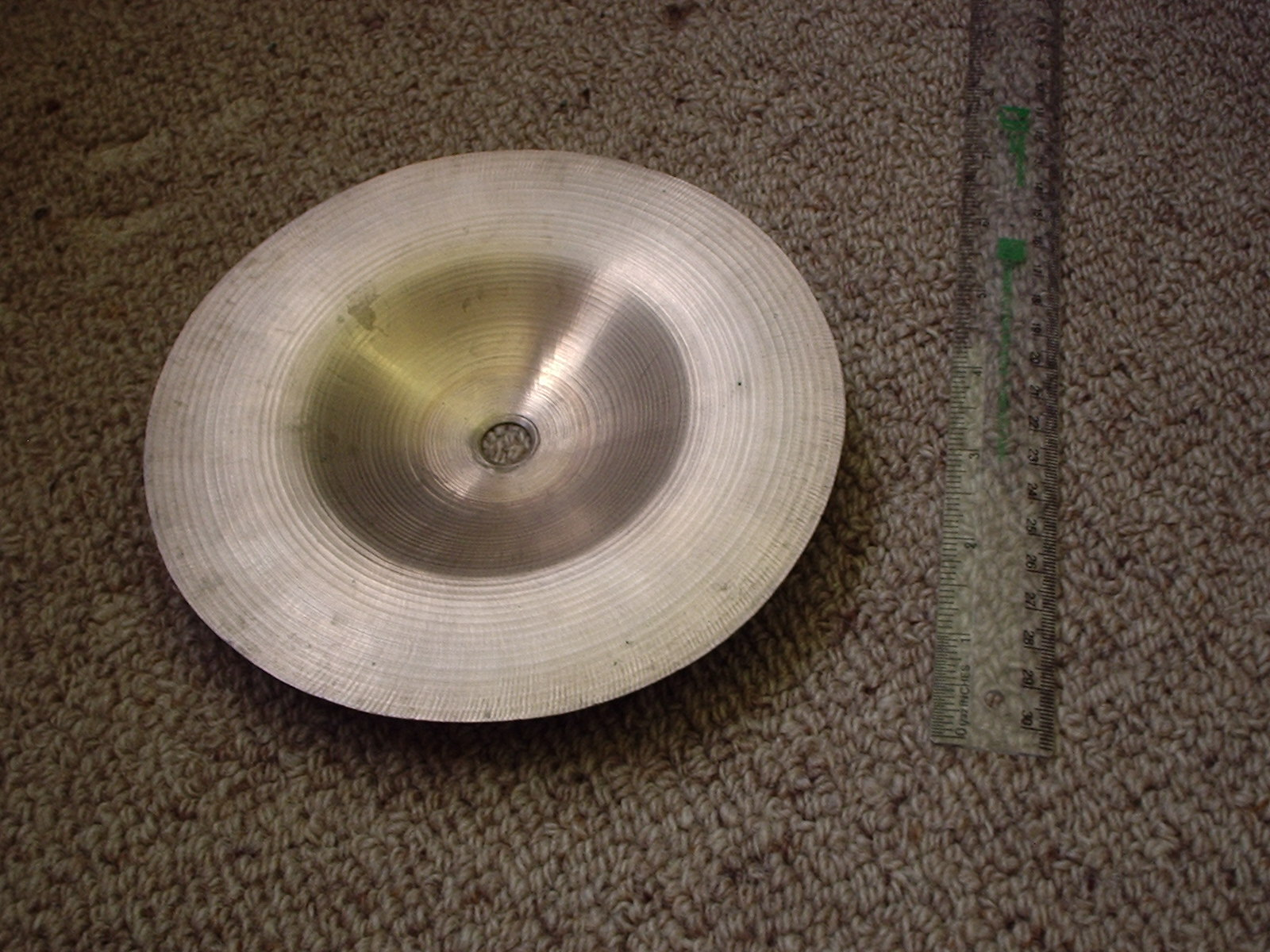
Underside

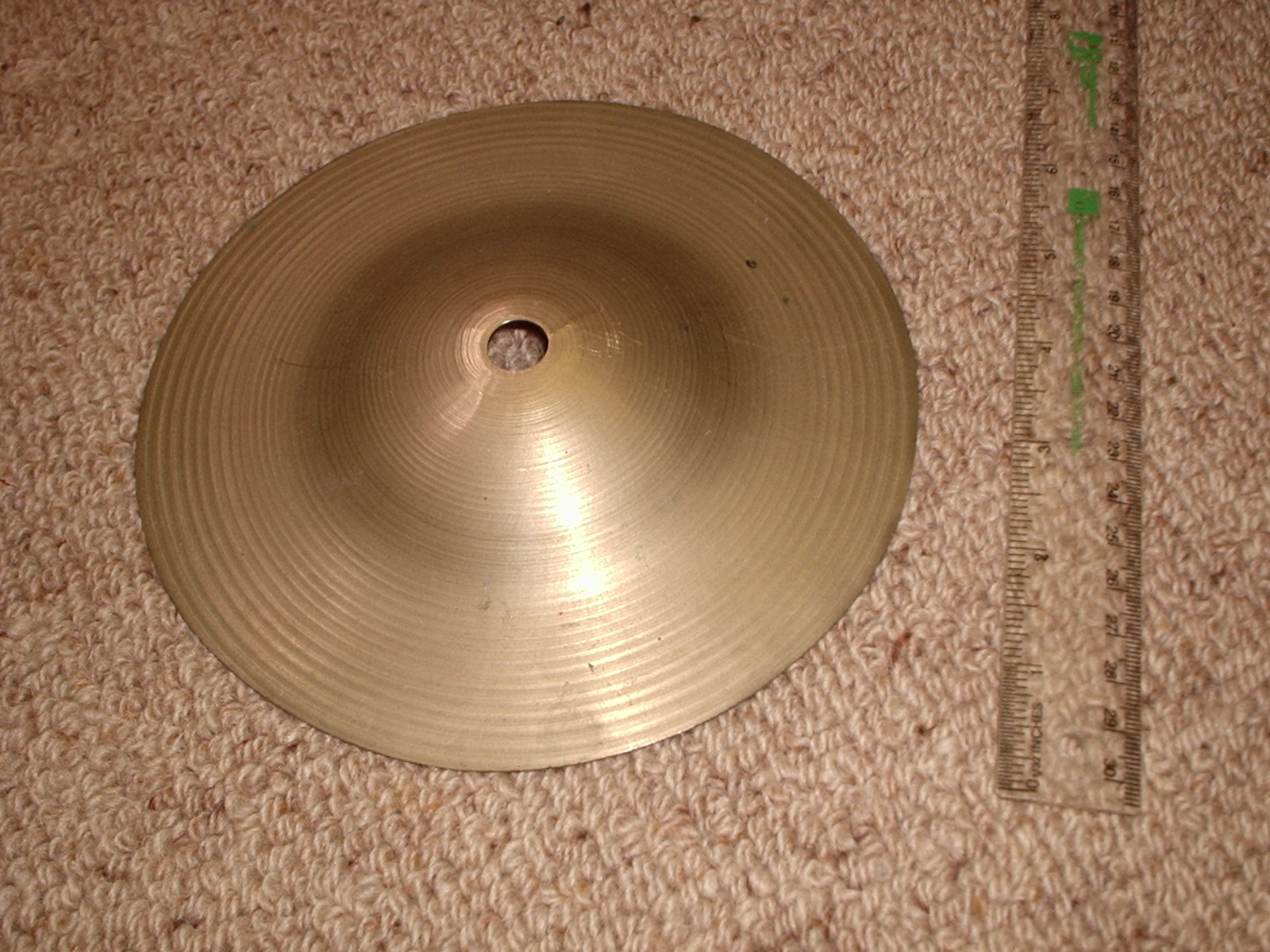
Bell cymbal made by cutting down a larger cymbal

== See also ==
- Splash cymbal
