= Rute (music) =

Beater for drums

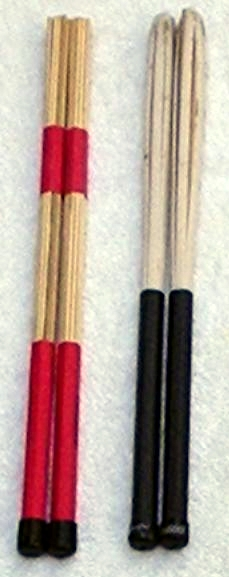
Cane rute drum sticks

The rute (also spelled ruthe, from the German for 'rod' or 'switch'), also known as a multi-rod, is a beater for drums. Commercially made rutes are usually made of a bundle of thin birch dowels or thin canes attached to a drum stick handle. These often have a movable band to adjust how tightly the dowels are bound toward the tip. A rute may also be made of a bundle of twigs attached to a drum stick handle. These types of rutes are used for a variety of effects with various musical ensembles. A rute may also be a cylindrical bunch of pieces of cane or twigs, bound at one end, like a small besom without a handle. The rute is used to play on the head of the bass drum. Rute are also constructed from a solid rod thinly split partway down.

== Etymology ==
The name of the instruments derives from German Rute (rod). The final e is pronounced, making the pronunciation 'ROOT-eh'.

== Orchestral usage ==
In orchestral music, rute (or ruthe) first appeared in the music of Mozart, in his opera Die Entführung aus dem Serail, K. 384 (1782). The setting of the opera is Turkey, and rute were imported from Turkish Janissary music, the martial music of the Sultan's royal guard, very much in vogue at the time. (James Blades, "Percussion Instruments and their History" 1992) The rute were played by the bass drum player, with a mallet striking on downbeats and rute being struck on offbeats. A typical pattern in this style would generally go, in 4/4 time, boom-tap-tap-tap boom-tap-tap-tap, the taps representing strikes of the rute. Mozart's contemporaries and immediate successors used the rute in a similar fashion for military effect. Gustav Mahler's use of the rute in the third movement of his Symphony No. 2 completely broke away from the traditional military writing of the implementation, instead focusing more on its coloristic possibilities than on the rhythmic role. It is also present in the fifth and final movement of his Symphony No. 7 where it coincides with an English horn solo. This application was continued by Edgard Varese in his coloristic use of percussion. Michael Giacchino uses rute in his 2009 score to Star Trek.

== Drum kit usage ==
Widespread usage of the rute in kit drumming dates from US patent 4535671, 20 August 1985, where Pro-Mark described their new Hot Rod rute-type drumstick intended for drum kit use. Variations such as Lightning Rods (seven canes, as opposed to nineteen for the Hot Rod), Thunder Rods (seven thicker canes giving the same weight as the Hot Rod) and Cool Rods (nineteen thin canes giving a similar weight to the Lightning Rod) soon followed from Pro-Mark.

The rute stick for drum kit is now produced by most major drum stick manufacturers including also Vic Firth and Vater.

== Grip techniques ==
The rute stick is held in the same way as a drum stick, and therefore is usually held either with a matched grip or a traditional grip. The "handle" of the rute is the plastic area, as the drum or cymbal is struck with the wooden "rutes" or bundles of wooden stick.
