= Regal Tip =

American drum stick and mallet manufacturer

- Industry: Music equipment
- Founded: Niagara Falls, NY (1958)
- Founder: Joe Calato
- Headquarters: Niagara Falls, NY, United States
- Key people: Joe Calato
- Products: Drum sticks, brushes, mallets, rutes, and general accessories
- Website: www.regaltip.com

Regal Tip is one of the world's largest manufacturers of drum sticks and other percussion mallets. They produce a range of beaters, but are particularly noted as a manufacturer of premium steel brushes and nylon tipped drumsticks. In 2003, the company was the largest manufacturer of brushes.

In 1958, drummer Joe Calato introduced his invention of the nylon tip drumstick to improve the longevity of sticks. Joe opened a factory to produce and ship sticks worldwide. The company also manufactures wood tip drumsticks, brushes, mallets, signature brushes, signature drumsticks, rutes, and general accessories.

Joe Calato died on September 1, 2023.

== Notable endorsers ==
- Joe Calato, founder of the company
- Alex Van Halen of Van Halen
- Álvaro López
- Don Henley of The Eagles
- Jules Radino of Blue Öyster Cult
- Chester Thompson of Genesis
- Jason Sutter of Smash Mouth
- Danny Needham of Venom
- Kerim Lechner of Septicflesh
- Paul Mazurkiewicz of Cannibal Corpse
- Robert Sweet of Stryper
- Bill Gibson of Huey Lewis
- Jeff Porcaro of Toto
- Jeff Hamilton, of Jeff Hamilton Trio
- Daniel Adair of Nickelback
- Dan Buch of Gamma
- Keith Reber of Vanilla Ice
- Daniel De Los Reyes of Zac Brown
- Bill Kreutzmann of The Grateful Dead
- Mickey Hart of The Grateful Dead
- Bill Rieflin of REM
- Coady Willis of The Melvins
- Kris Gustofson of Trauma
- Dale Crover of The Melvins
- Daray Brzozowski of Dimmu Borgir
- Dennis Zimmer of Lita Ford
- Frankie Lombardi of Dickey Betts
- Gary Mallaber, session great
- George Recile of Bob Dylan
- Kenny Washington, session great
- Dave Dzialak of Jeff Scott Soto
- Graeme Edge of The Moody Blues
- Kenny Dale Johnson of Chris Isaac
- Bill Janson of Independent Artist
- Mickey Curry of Bryan Adams
- Rob Mount of Lou Gramm
- Ron Tutt of Elvis Presley and Neil Diamond
- Ryan Moran of Slightly Stoopid
- Ryan Van Poederooyen of Devin Townsend
- Stefanie Eulinberg of Kid Rock
- Tommy Craig of Pat Travers
- Joe LaBarbera of Bill Evans

=== Past endorsers include ===
- Stewart Copeland of The Police
- Max Weinberg of Bruce Springsteen
- Lars Ulrich of Metallica
- Aaron Sterling- Session Player
- Pete Holmes of Black N Blue
- Andy Newmark of David Bowie and Roxy Music
- John Robinson, session player
- Eric Carr of Kiss
- Russell Gilbrook of Uriah Heep
- Glen Sobel of Alice Cooper
- Tommy Clufetos of Ozzy Osbourne
- Brian Tichy of The Dead Daisies
