= Swish cymbal =

Ride cymbal design

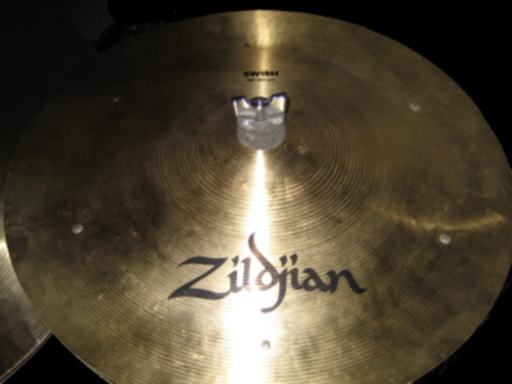
- Original design Zildjian swish cymbal with six rivets, mounted bell up

Percussion instrument
- Classification: Percussion
- Hornbostel–Sachs classification: 111.242.12+112.12 (Hanging bells suspended from the apex with rattles attached to a carrier against which they strike)
- Inventor(s): Robert Zildjian, Gene Krupa, Mel Lewis
- Developed: 1940s

Related instruments
- Pang cymbal

Builders
- All major cymbal companies, many boutique makers

The swish cymbal and the pang cymbal are exotic ride cymbals originally developed and named as part of the collaboration between Gene Krupa and the Avedis Zildjian Company. The current Zildjian Swish Knocker is a redesign of their original swish, with more rivets, deeper bow and shallower bell, based on a cymbal made famous by Mel Lewis, who coined the name knocker.

Originally a Zildjian exclusive, both swish and pang cymbals disappeared from their catalog for a time but have reappeared. Other makers have also offered explicit swish and pang designs from time to time. Typical sizes are 16" to 22" for the swish, and 16" to 20" for the pang.

Both swish and pang have the upturned and flanged edge of a china cymbal, with a very small bell, a thin profile overall with little taper, and a relatively thick rim for their size and weight. Although principally ride cymbals, they can also serve as exotic crash cymbals, particularly in the smaller sizes and at higher volumes. As a ride they can be mounted either bell up, for a trashier tone, or bell down, for a more mellow tone and better access to the ride area; As a crash they tend to be mounted bell down, to give a traditional rim angle.

The swish has a higher tone than the pang and is washier with a less pronounced ping, and this difference is accentuated as the swish is generally sold with rivets as a sizzle cymbal, while the pang is sold without rivets. However some drummers remove the rivets from a swish, or add them to a pang, to create intermediate sounds.

Swish and pang cymbals are sometimes considered types of china cymbal, towards the mellow end of the spectrum, and cymbals that are swishes and pangs in all but name have also been offered as china types by both Zildjian and other makers. Ufip produces a swish china in 16", 18", 20" and 22" models.

== Examples ==
- Dream 20" Pang China
- Istanbul Mehmet 22" Swish Traditional Series
- Meinl Byzance Jazz 22" China Ride
- Paiste 22" Masters Swish
- Paiste 24" 2002 Swish Ride
- Sabian 22" Crescent Hammertone Chinese
- Ufip 18" Extstatic Swish China
- Zildjian 16" A Custom Rezo Pang
- Zildjian 22" A Swish Knocker
