= Vater Percussion =

US manufacturing company

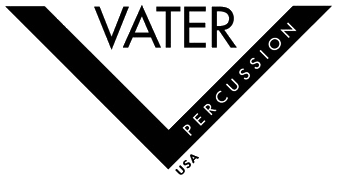
- Company type: Private
- Founded: 1956; 70 years ago in Boston
- Founder: Jack Adams and Fred Maichle
- Headquarters: Holbrook, United States
- Products: Drum sticks and mallets
- Owners: Ron, Alan Vater
- Website: vater.com

Vater Percussion is an American manufacturing company based in Holbrook, Massachusetts. The company has always focused on percussion instruments, producing drum sticks, brushes and mallets. It was founded by Jack Adams, and later run by his two grandsons Ron and Alan Vater.

Although the company began producing sticks in 1956, it did not officially become "Vater Percussion" until much later.

== History ==
In the 1950s, Boston area drummer Jack Adams opened Jack's Drumshop in Boston, and in 1956, Fred Maichle began hand-turning drum sticks for the shop, sometimes supplying custom drumsticks to musicians touring through the area, including Philly Joe Jones, Louie Bellson, and Buddy Rich.

Eventually Jack Adams set up shop in the C. Vater Music Center, a music store opened by his son in law, Clarence Vater in Norwood. Vater's sons, Alan and Ron, worked at the store with their father and grandfather. In the late 1970s, the supply of popular Regal Tip drum sticks was disrupted by a labor dispute, so the family decided to rent lathe time locally to turn their own drumsticks for the store. Then in the early 1980s, musical instrument distribution company Harris Fandell approached the Vater family to manufacture drum sticks, which were marketed under the Power Sonic Drumsticks brand. Ron and Alan Vater began working with Vic Firth to design and manufacture drum sticks for the brand, after which they were approached by Zildjian, launching that company's line of drumsticks in 1986. Vater expanded into manufacturing deals with Tama and Pearl, as well as private label drum sticks for distributors in the Netherlands, Denmark, France, Australia, and New Zealand.

On 22 October 1988, Vater expanded with a new factory in Holbrook, Massachusetts and shortly thereafter Vater's relationship with Zildjian and Vic Firth ended. The company decided to launch their own brand, launching Vater-branded drumsticks in 1990. By the mid-1990s, Vater had become one of top 5 American drum stick manufacturers.

Vater guarantees their sticks to be "straighter, more consistent and of higher quality than all other leading drumstick manufacturers". Vater sticks typically have a higher moisture content than other drumsticks, which is intended to create more durable drumsticks, though this does result in a slightly heavier stick.

Besides drum sticks, Vater also manufactures a variety of timpani mallets, marimba mallets, vibraphone mallets, brushes, specialty sticks, silence mutes, stick bags, drink holders, educational products and other accessories.

== Notable Vater Artists ==
- Steven Adler of Guns N' Roses
- Tim Alexander of Primus
- Sasha Berliner (Jazz Vibraphonist)
- Deen Castronovo (Journey)
- Matt Chamberlain
- Vinnie Colaiuta
- Stewart Copeland (The Police)
- John Cowsill (The Beach Boys)
- John Dolmayan (System of a Down)
- Fred Eltringham (Sheryl Crow)
- Frank Ferrer (Guns N' Roses)
- Nathan Followill (Kings of Leon)
- Brian Frasier Moore (Justin Timberlake)
- Taku Hirano (Fleetwood Mac)
- Victor Indrizzo
- Sean Kinney (Alice In Chains)
- Mike Mangini (Dream Theater)
- Roy Mayorga (Stone Sour)
- Matt McGuire (The Chainsmokers)
- Morgan Rose (Sevendust)
- Ilan Rubin (Nine Inch Nails)
- Chad Sexton (311)
- Chad Smith (Red Hot Chili Peppers)
- Marvin Smith
- Glen Sobel (Alice Cooper)
- Mona Tavakoli (Jason Mraz)
- Scott Travis (Judas Priest)
- Jay Weinberg (Slipknot)
- Max Weinberg (Bruce Springsteen)
- Mike Wengren (Disturbed)
