= Splash cymbal =

Type of effect cymbal

In a drum kit, splash cymbals are the smallest accent cymbals, often a smaller derivative of the more common crash cymbals. Splash cymbals and china cymbals are the main types of effects cymbals.

The most common sized splash has a diameter of 8", followed by 10". Most splash cymbals are in the size range of 6" to 13", but some splash cymbals are as small as 4". Splash cymbals larger than 10" are most often similar to hi-hats in sound characteristics.

Some makers have produced cymbals described as splash up to 22", but a splash of 14" or more is more often described as a crash cymbal.

Splash cymbals include:

- Traditional splash cymbals, medium in weight with little or no taper.
- Rock splash cymbals, heavy but often with a slight taper.
- China splash cymbals.
- Salsa splash cymbals.
- Thin splash cymbals.
- Bell cymbals.
- Specialised stack cymbals.

== History ==
The original and traditional splash, like many of the cymbal types in a drum kit, was invented and named by Gene Krupa in collaboration with the Avedis Zildjian Company.

Widely used in the jazz music of the 1920s and 30s, this traditional splash cymbal was not seen for many years in mainstream music for years until drummers such as Ringo Starr started to use them. Stewart Copeland playing in The Police brought it back to prominence. Thanks to a toy cymbal he found in a trip in Asia and which he brought to Paiste, heavier splash cymbals, more suited to this style of drumming, were soon available and started being heavily commercialized.

A third phase in the development of splash cymbals occurred when china splash cymbals became popular. These added a new dimension to drumming in their own right, and also led to the development of cymbal stacks.

Several other types that are now regarded as splash cymbals, such as bell and salsa cymbals, have more quietly been added to the kits of leading drummers and to the catalogues of major cymbal manufacturers over the years. Today much of the color of an extended drum kit is provided by the wide variety of splash cymbals available.

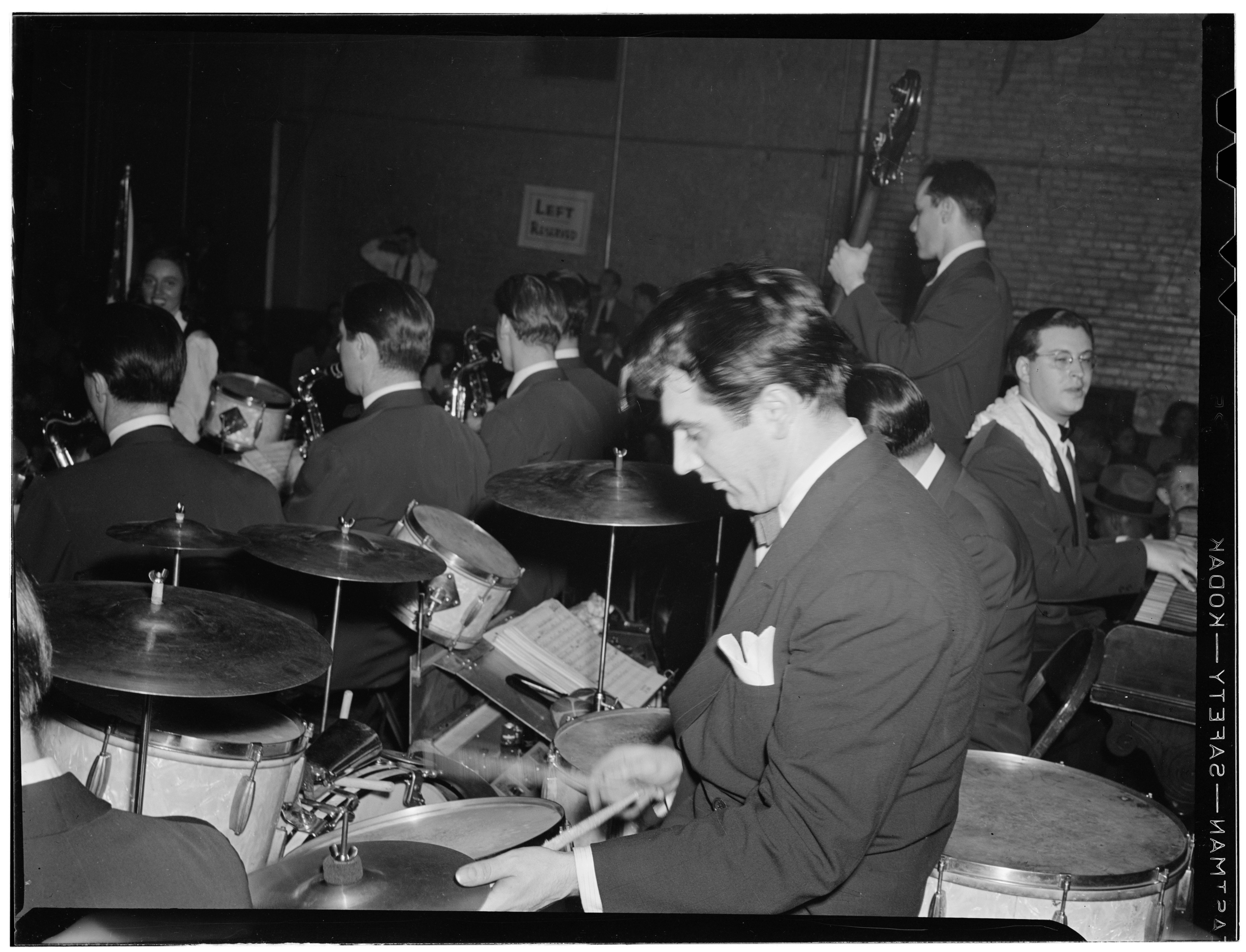
Gene Krupa with two splash cymbals

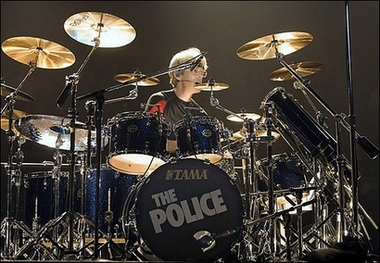
Stewart Copeland with three splash cymbals

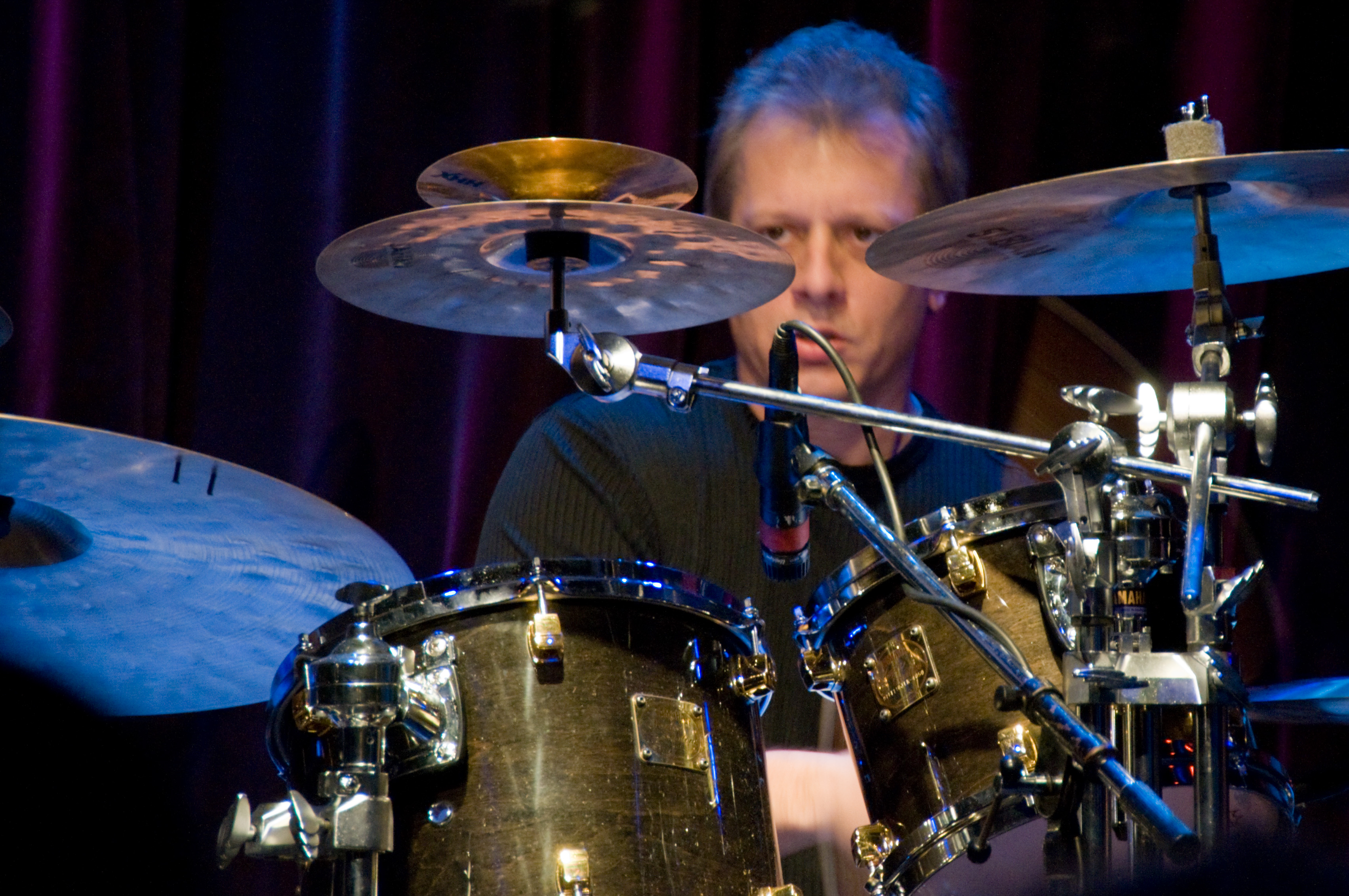
Dave Weckl with piggybacked splash (detail below)

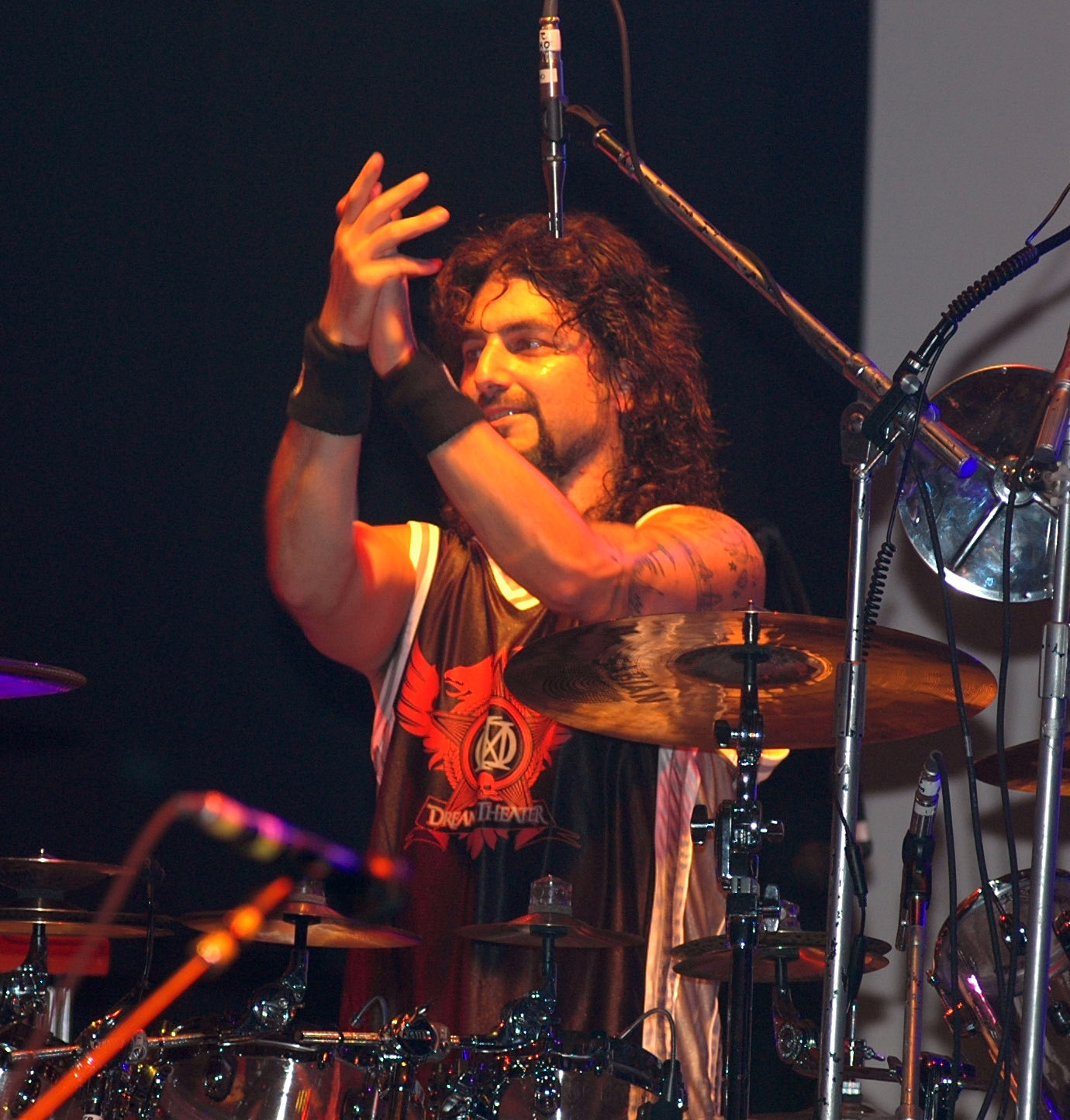
Mike Portnoy with stacked splashes (detail below)

== Types ==
=== Traditional ===
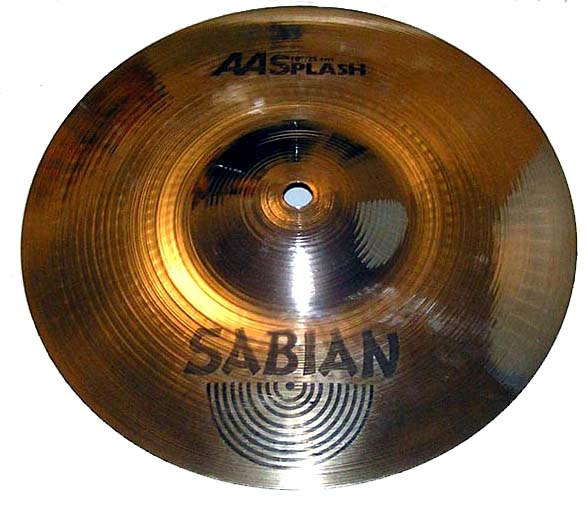
Sabian 10" AA Splash

Traditional splash cymbals, as first popularized by Gene Krupa, are 8"-12" in size and medium in weight with little or no taper and therefore a thick rim for their size.

The normal function of a splash cymbal is to provide a short, often highly syncopated accent. For their size, they are hit relatively hard to produce a quick attack and decay. They tend to have little taper in order to provide the necessary strength for this, the bell being approximately the same thickness as the rim, resulting in limited richness of tone.

=== Rock ===
Rock musicians favor a heavier splash cymbal often with a slight taper, 6"-12", giving a fuller sound at higher volumes.

=== China ===
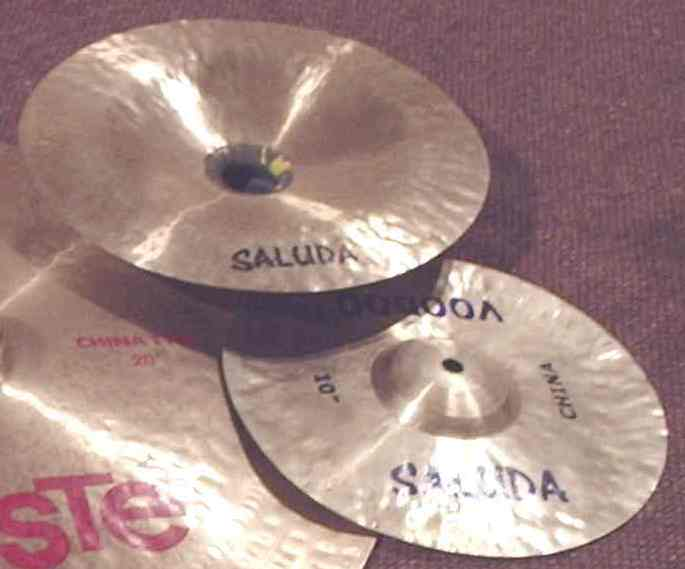
Saluda Voodoo 12" china and 10" china splash, against a Paiste 20" china

China type cymbals of less than 14" are generally referred to as china splash cymbals when used in a drum kit, and are made in a wide variety of shapes and in sizes 6"-12".

This terminology is not entirely consistent. Sabian, for example, calls its rounded bell 12" china a mini Chinese, and this same design is also available in 14", Paiste Twenty Series features a rounded bell mini china 8", 10" and 12", while in the Saluda Voodoo series the 12" square bell china is simply called a china, while the heavier 10" rounded bell model is called a china splash. This is not entirely illogical; Many of these cymbals have little or no taper, and as a result some of the heavier ones, unlike most splash cymbals, can be used as an exotic ride cymbal at moderate volume.

The 8" and 10" Sabian Rocktagon splash cymbals, smaller versions of their octagonal 16" and 18" Rocktagon crashes, are sometimes described as china splashes and have an intermediate tone.

China splashes were used in Mike Portnoy's original cymbal stacks, and remain popular as the top cymbal in a stack.

Examples:

- Hubei C series china 8"
- Sabian AAX Mini Chinese 12"
- Saluda Decadence China Blast 10"
- Paiste Twenty Mini China 8"

=== Salsa ===
A salsa splash is a small cymbal primarily intended for use with a set of timbales. Use of a cymbal or cowbell (but by tradition, never both) is a fundamental part of many styles of timbale playing.

Example:

- Sabian El Sabor Salsa Splash 13"

=== Thin ===
Thin splash cymbals are made in sizes 8"-12" with a pronounced taper and a sound more akin to a crash than to traditional splashes. They are fragile and unsuitable for inexperienced drummers, and even then suitable only for quieter playing, and generally only available in B20 alloy and in the more expensive and professional cymbal series.

At the thinnest and most fragile end of the scale, a thin splash is identical to, and interchangeable with, a cymbal designed for playing by hand rather than by stick. And in either case, a single careless stroke with a drumstick will split the cymbal.

=== Bell ===
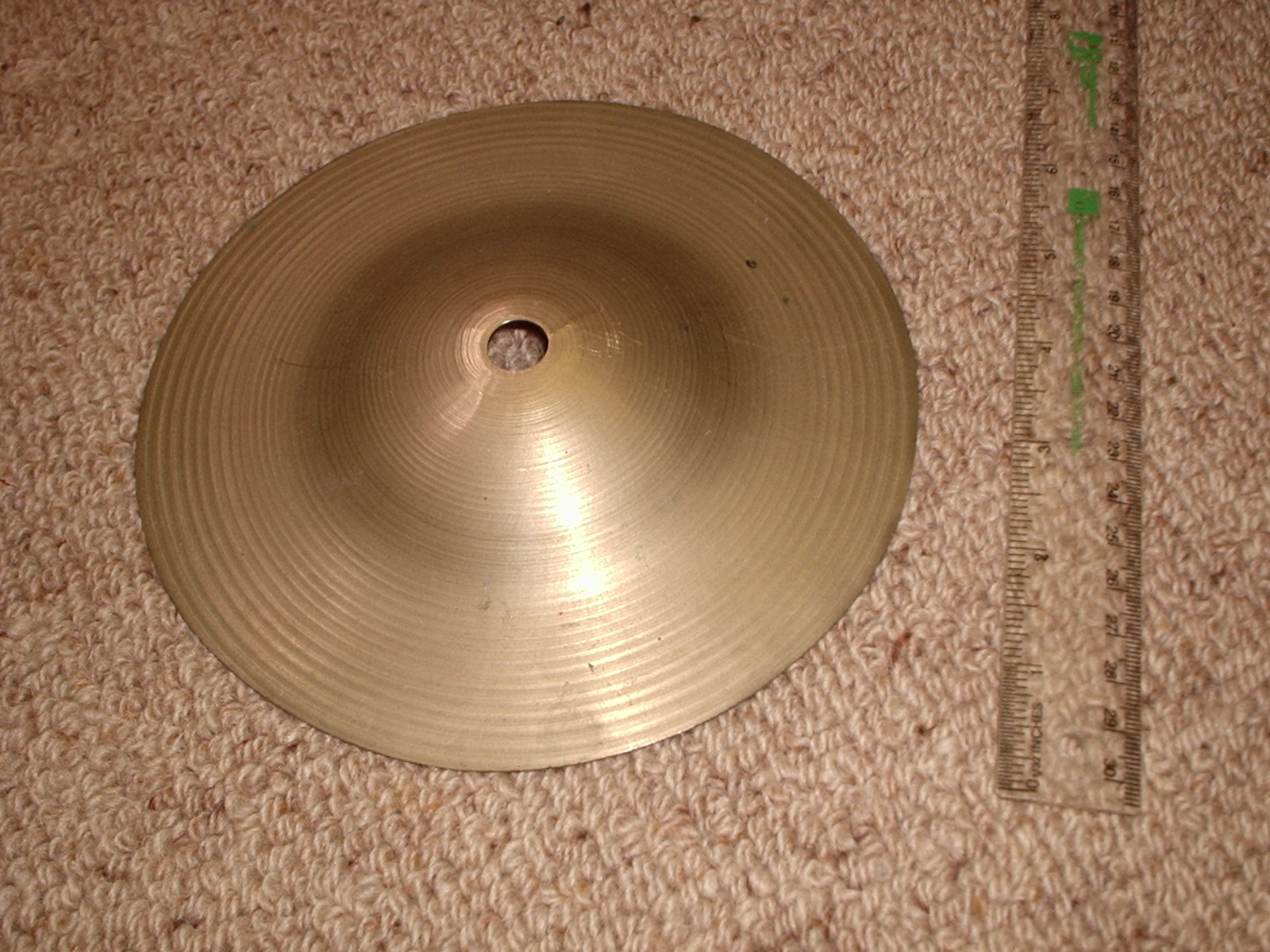
Bell cymbal made by cutting down a larger cymbal

Bell cymbals, 4"-8" or occasionally bigger, are extremely thick cymbals giving a bell-like tone. Paiste makes one in 13".

The earliest bell cymbals were made by cutting down a larger cymbal, particularly to salvage something from one that was badly split at the edge.

Bell cymbals range in shape from deep and cuplike, similar in shape to a church bell, to a traditional cymbal shape, almost flat, and many in between.

=== Sizzle splash ===
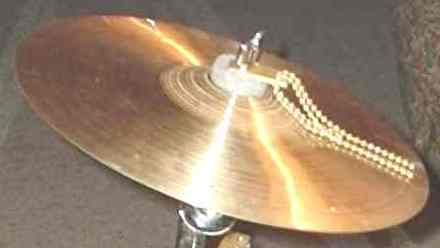
Paiste 11" trad splash with sizzler

Small sizzle cymbals, and splash cymbals with sizzler attachments, give an even shorter, washier tone than a traditional splash.

=== Stacks ===
Specialised thin stack cymbals, 8"-12", are designed specifically for stacking, most commonly as the upper cymbal.

They are available individually or, more recently, in sets of two or three, including larger cymbals intended primarily as the lower cymbal or cymbals. These sets have provided new sounds but have not replaced the established technique of using a china, crash or another splash as the upper cymbal of a stack. Generally, the three way sets are designed to make possible several usable two-cymbal stacks in addition to the three-cymbal combination, and most cymbals of all such sets are designed to also be stacked with other cymbals, giving a very wide range of tonal possibilities.

Similarly, despite the availability of these cymbals specifically designed for stacking, many drummers still use a china or a splash as the upper cymbal.

Examples:

- Sabian Max Stax High 8"
- Paiste Noise Works Tripple Raw Smash 12", 14", 14"

== Mounting ==
The splash cymbal, because of its varied usage and small size, is mounted in many ways. Some common ways are:

- On a separate boom stand. This can be of relatively light construction without a counterweight owing to the light weight of the cymbal.
- On an auxiliary boom attached to a stand used principally to support a drum or another, larger cymbal. This is the traditional method.
- On an auxiliary boom attached to the rim of a snare drum or timbales. This is particularly popular for playing latin rhythms.
- By piggybacking on a larger cymbal. The two cymbals must be separated by an extra felt if they are not to each affect the other's tone and risk damage.
- By use of a double stand that mounts the top cymbal on an extension of the stand that replaces the wing nut holding the bottom cymbal. These are commercially available but more often created by adding an accessory to a single stand.
- As the upper cymbal in a stack in which another cymbal is deliberately in contact with the splash.
Common mounting techniques
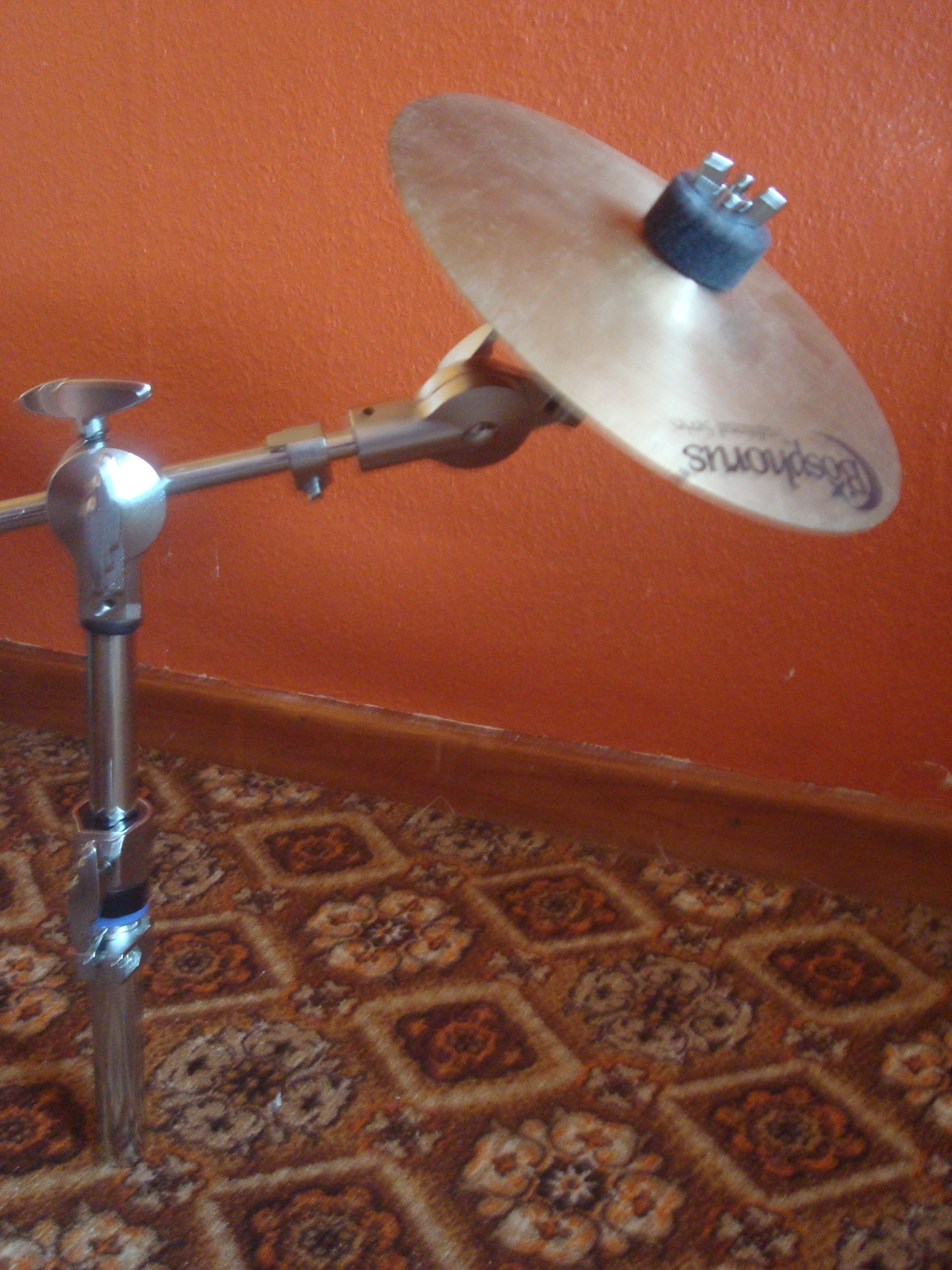
On a separate boom stand

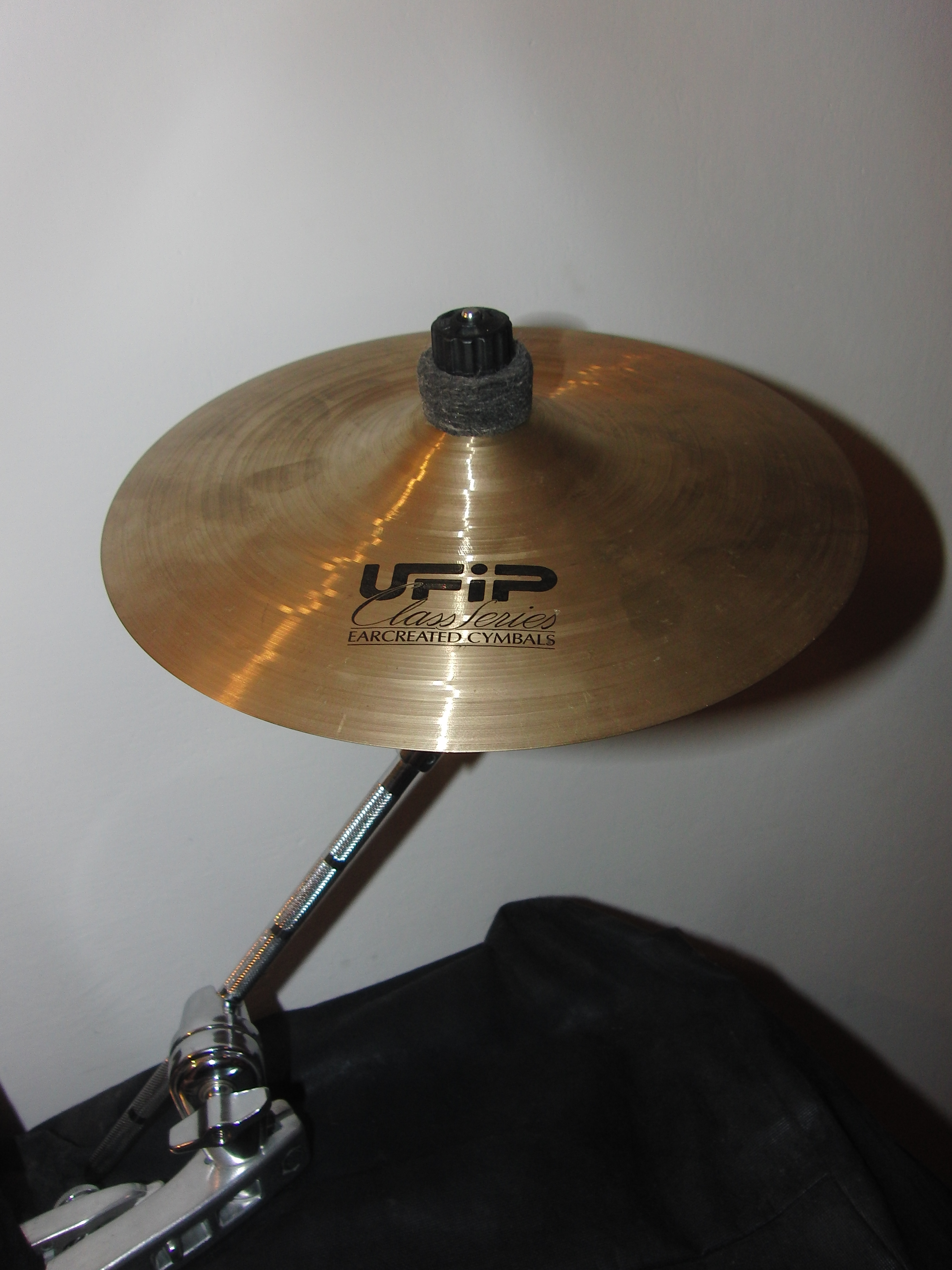
attached to another stand

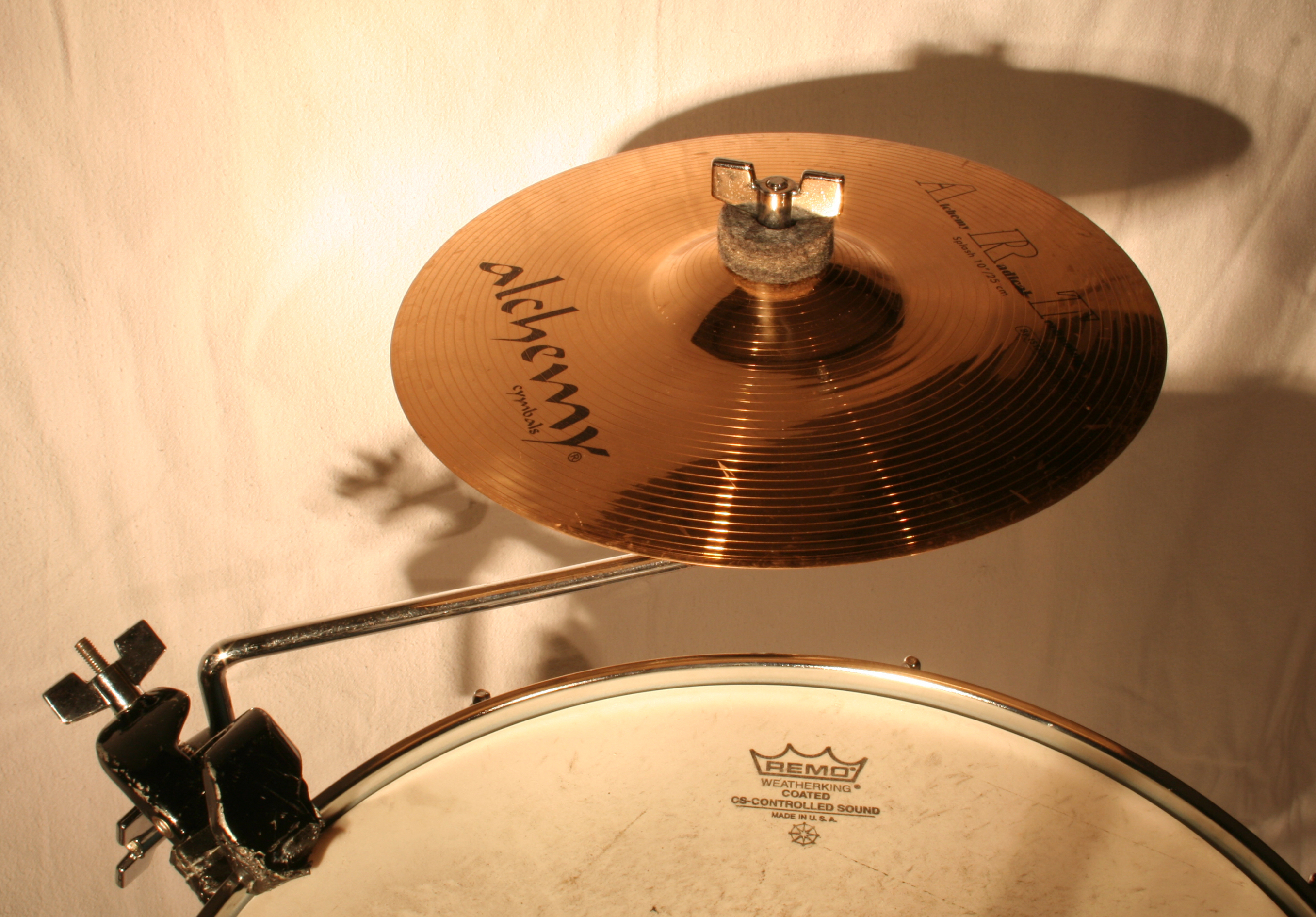
attached to a snare drum rim

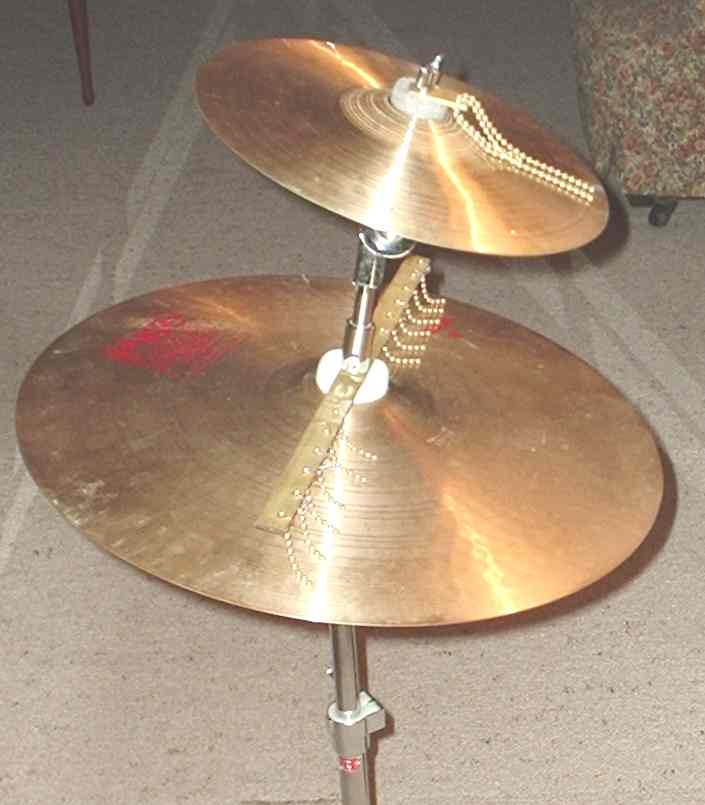
on a double stand

Several of these techniques, notably stacking and piggybacking, are very rarely used for cymbals other than splash cymbals. The rim-mounted boom is restricted to splash cymbals owing to the weight of other cymbal types, but similar mounts, traditionally on the top of the rear rim of the bass drum but also on other drums, are occasionally used for other lightweight accent effects, particularly a cowbell and/or a wood block.

=== Stacking ===
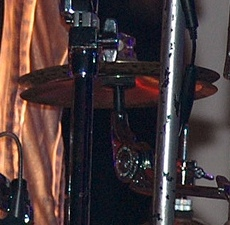
Mike Portnoy stacks a china splash on a traditional splash, see above

A cymbal stack is a combination of two or more cymbals mounted in contact, producing a sound unlike any single cymbal. The effect is similar to a loosely closed hi-hat, or can alternatively be seen as an extreme case of a sizzle cymbal with the upper cymbal serving as a single large jangle. The exact effect is dependent on the tension on the mounting bolt, and with some combinations can be varied from a very short crunch to a much longer buzz.

This technique was pioneered by Dave Weckl, Mike Portnoy and others, originally using a china splash as the upper cymbal. Portnoy mounted both cymbals bell up, with no spacing felt, to maximize contact between them, and choosing cymbals of sufficiently different profile to ensure that the contact was not enough to choke them completely.

As the technique became established, cymbal makers introduced specialized stack cymbals designed specifically for use in stacks. However the older technique, using a china splash on top of a crash, china or another splash, also remains popular.

Stacking should not be confused with piggybacking, in which the upper cymbal is bell down, the lower cymbal bell up, and a spacing felt is used between the cymbal bells, preventing any contact.

=== Piggybacking ===
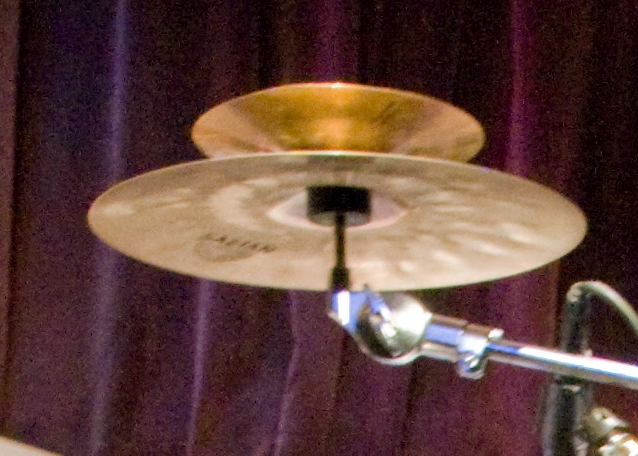
Dave Weckl piggybacks a bell on a traditional splash, see above

Piggybacking is a method of mounting a splash cymbal, mostly restricted to small splashes, by simply placing it inverted above another cymbal, with which it shares the mounting bolt and its sheath, washers if used and wingnut. A spacing felt is normally used to separate the cymbals, serving as the top felt of the lower cymbal and the bottom felt of the upper cymbal in order to avoid cymbal cracking.

There is an essential difference between this technique and stacking. A cymbal stack produces a different sound to that produced by either cymbal individually. The piggyback, like the double stand, is primarily a method of mounting the splash cymbal, without producing any major difference in the tone of either cymbal.

Advantages of piggyback mounting are:

- Requires minimal mounting space, and therefore produces a more compact drum kit.
  - Allows the drummer to move between the two cymbals of the piggyback in a single motion.
  - A bonus for drummers who play in venues where space is very limited.
  - In very large, extended kits, it allows more cymbals to be within reach of the drummer.
- Requires little or no extra equipment, only the cymbal itself and normally one extra felt for spacing between the cymbals.
  - Faster setup and takedown.
  - Lighter traps cases.
  - Less to buy.
- It is possible to connect the two cymbals tonally by leaving out the spacing felt (but this risks damage and probably voids any warranty on both cymbals).

Disadvantages are:

- Requires the upper cymbal to be mounted bell down.
  - Produces a trashier tone which not all drummers like.
  - Exposes the rim to the stick in a way that the designer did not intend, often leading to damage. Many splashes have a relatively thick rim for their size, and can withstand a stroke that would break a crash cymbal, but thin splashes cannot generally be mounted bell down.
- Restricts playing of the lower cymbal, generally even to making playing its bell impossible.
- Restricts adjustment of the damping of either cymbal. The mounting bolt tension and the size of one felt are the same for both cymbals, as the mounting bolt, wingnut and this felt are all shared between them.

Many china splash cymbals and some bell cymbals are designed to be mounted bell down, and are particularly suited to piggyback mounting. Other splash cymbals, however, are very rarely mounted bell down except when piggybacked.

Most but not all drummers put an additional felt between the bells of the two cymbals, to eliminate any direct contact between the cymbals and retain the tone of each. However the slight contact between the bells if the extra felt is not used affects the tone of each cymbal only subtly, and some drummers like the tonal connection that results. Beginners sometimes use this technique for another reason entirely: The mounting bolt may not be long enough to allow an extra felt, or they may simply not have bought a felt when buying their first splash. Unfortunately, the metal to metal contact and the playing of the upturned splash rim both decrease the life of the cymbal, particularly at the hands of a beginner.

The lower cymbal of the piggyback is often a crash, or less often a ride, but larger splashes and even chinas can be used. The upper cymbal could in theory be any cymbal small enough to allow the lower cymbal to be played, but in practice is almost always a splash.
