= Drum stick =

Type of percussion mallet

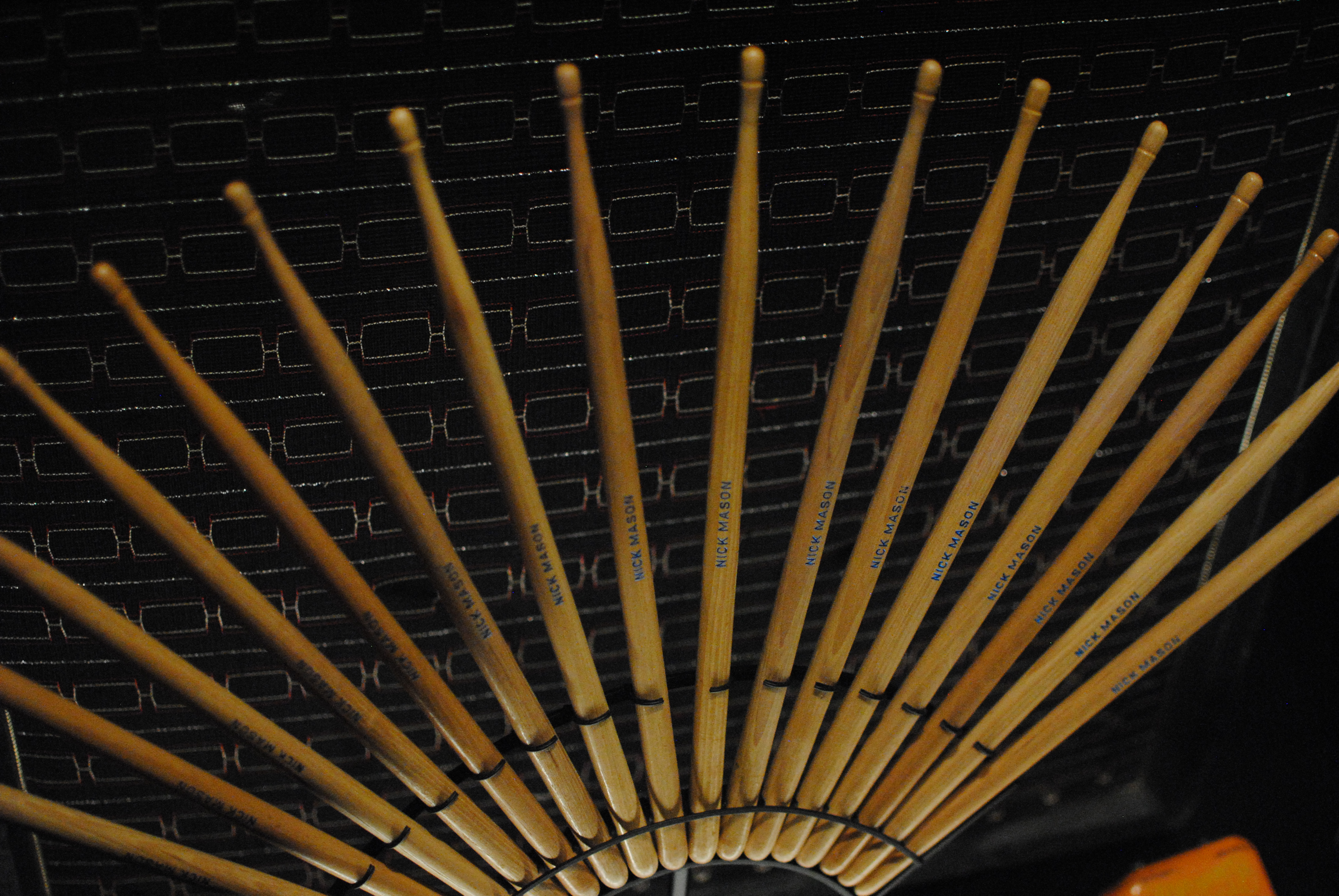
A selection of Nick Mason's customized drumsticks, from various makers, displayed at the Pink Floyd: Their Mortal Remains exhibition

A drum stick (or drumstick) is a type of percussion mallet used particularly for playing snare drum, drum kit, and some other percussion instruments, (bass drum, marching toms, etc.) and particularly for playing unpitched percussion.

Specialized beaters used on some other percussion instruments, such as the metal beater used with a triangle or the mallets used with tuned percussion (such as xylophone and timpani), are not normally referred to as drumsticks. Drumsticks generally have all of the following characteristics:

- They are normally supplied and used in pairs.
- They may be used to play at least some sort of drum (as well as other instruments).
- They are normally used only for unpitched percussion.

== Construction ==
The parts of a simple drumstick

The archetypical drumstick is turned from a single piece of wood, most commonly of hickory, less commonly of maple, and least commonly but still in significant numbers, of oak. Drumsticks of the traditional form are also made from metal, carbon fibre, and other modern materials.

The tip or bead is the part most often used to strike the instrument. Originally and still commonly of the same piece of wood as the rest of the stick, sticks with nylon tips have also been available since 1958. In the 1970s, an acetal tip was introduced.

Tips of whatever material are of various shapes, including acorn, barrel, oval, teardrop, pointed and round.

The shoulder of the stick is the part that tapers towards the tip, and is normally slightly convex. It is often used for playing the bell of a cymbal. It can also be used to produce a cymbal crash when applied with a glancing motion to the bow or edge of a cymbal, and for playing ride patterns on china, swish, and pang cymbals.

The shaft is the body of the stick, and is cylindrical for most applications including drum kit and orchestral work. It is used for playing cross stick and applied in a glancing motion to the rim of a cymbal for the loudest cymbal crashes.

The butt is the opposite end of the stick to the tip. Some rock and metal musicians use it rather than the tip.

== Conventional numbering ==
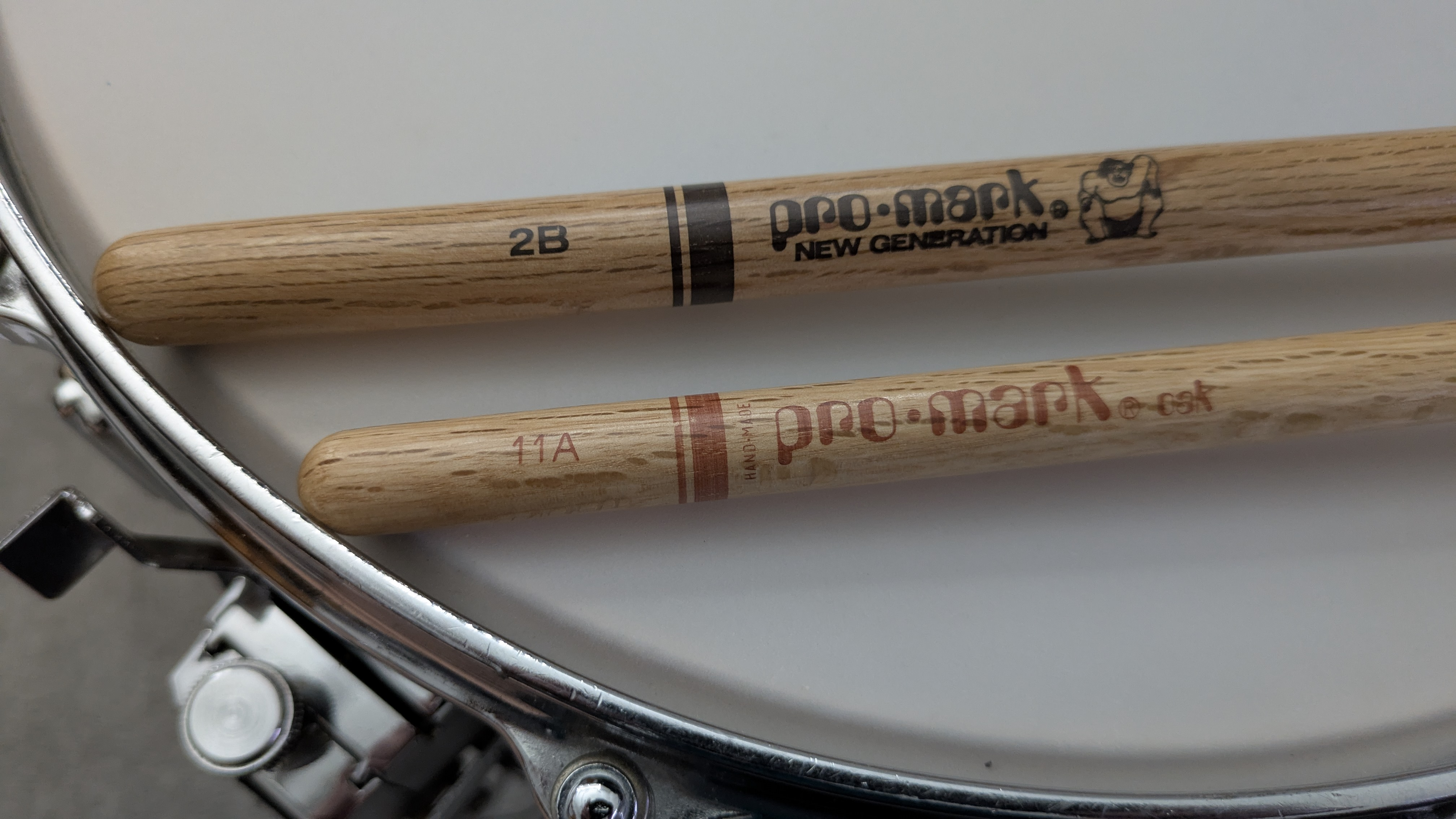
A pair of drumsticks on snare drum

Plain wooden drumsticks are most commonly described using a number to describe the weight and diameter of the stick followed by one or more letters to describe the tip. For example, a 7A is a common jazz stick with a wooden tip, while a 7AN is the same weight of stick with a nylon tip, and a 7B is a wooden tip but with a different tip profile, shorter and rounder than a 7A. A 5A is a common wood tipped rock stick, heavier than a 7A but with a similar profile. The numbers are most commonly odd but even numbers are used occasionally, in the range 2 (heaviest) to 11 (lightest).

The exact meanings of both numbers and letters differ from manufacturer to manufacturer, and some sticks are not described using this system at all, just being known as jazz (typically a 7A, 8A or 8D) or heavy rock (typically a 5B) for example. The most general purpose stick is a 5A. However, there is no one stick for any particular style of music.

== Grip ==
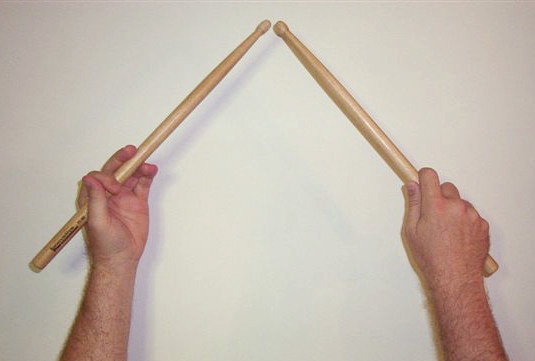
Traditional grip

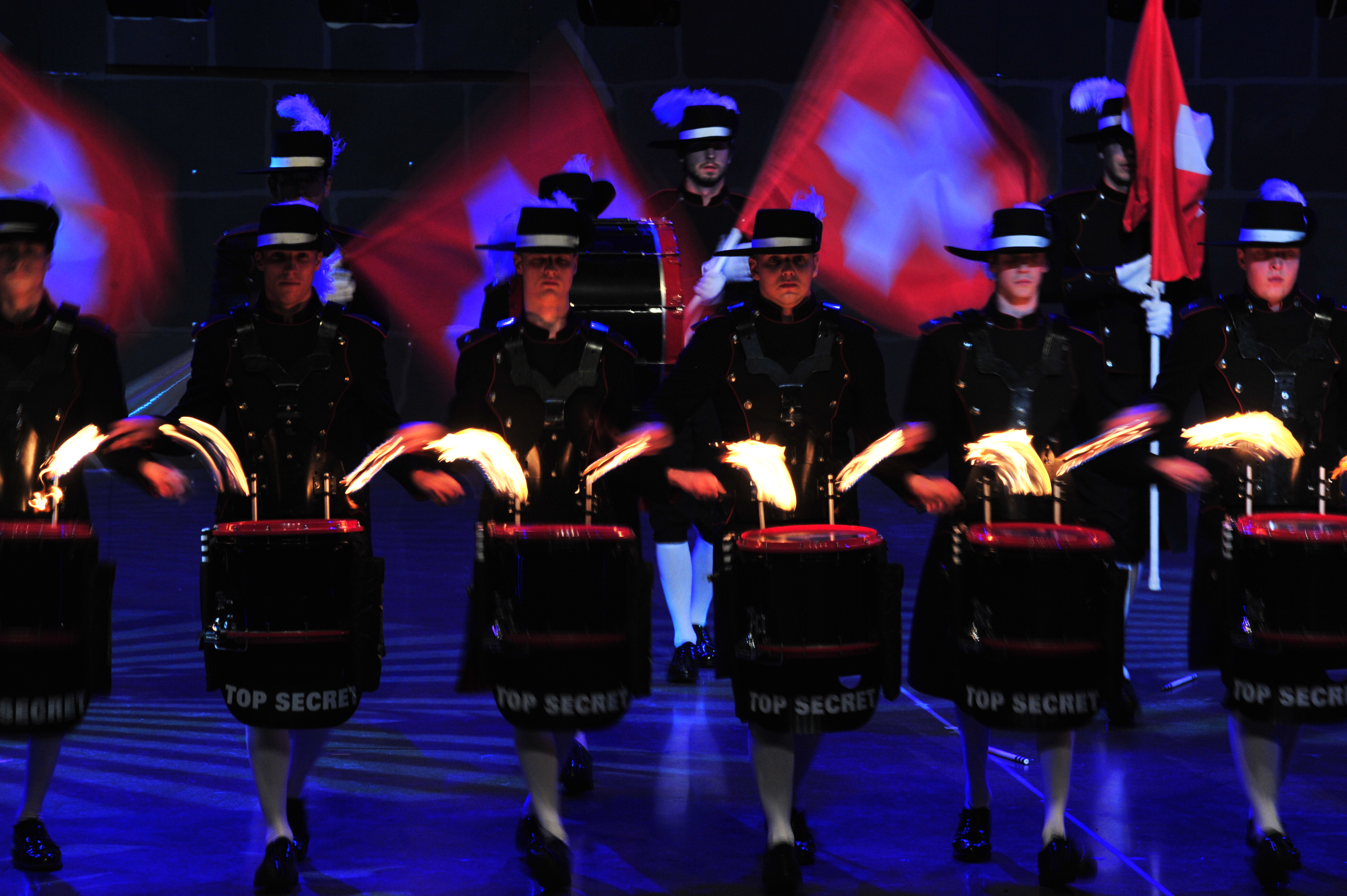
"Fire-sticks" used by Top Secret Drum Corps

There are two main ways of holding drumsticks:

- Traditional grip, in which right and left hands use different grips.
- Matched grip, in which the two hand grips are mirror-image.

Traditional grip was developed to conveniently play a snare drum while riding a horse, and was documented by Sanford A. Moeller in The Art of Snare Drumming (1925). It was the standard grip for kit drummers in the first half of the twentieth century and remains popular.

Matched grips became popular towards the middle of the twentieth century, threatening to displace the traditional grip for kit drumming. However the traditional grip has since made a comeback, and both types of grip are still used and promoted by leading drummers and teachers.

== Popular brands ==
- Pro-Mark
- Vic Firth
- Vater Percussion
- Regal Tip
- Tama Drums
- Zildjian

== See also ==
- Percussion mallet
