= Percussion mallet =

Object used to strike or beat a percussion instrument

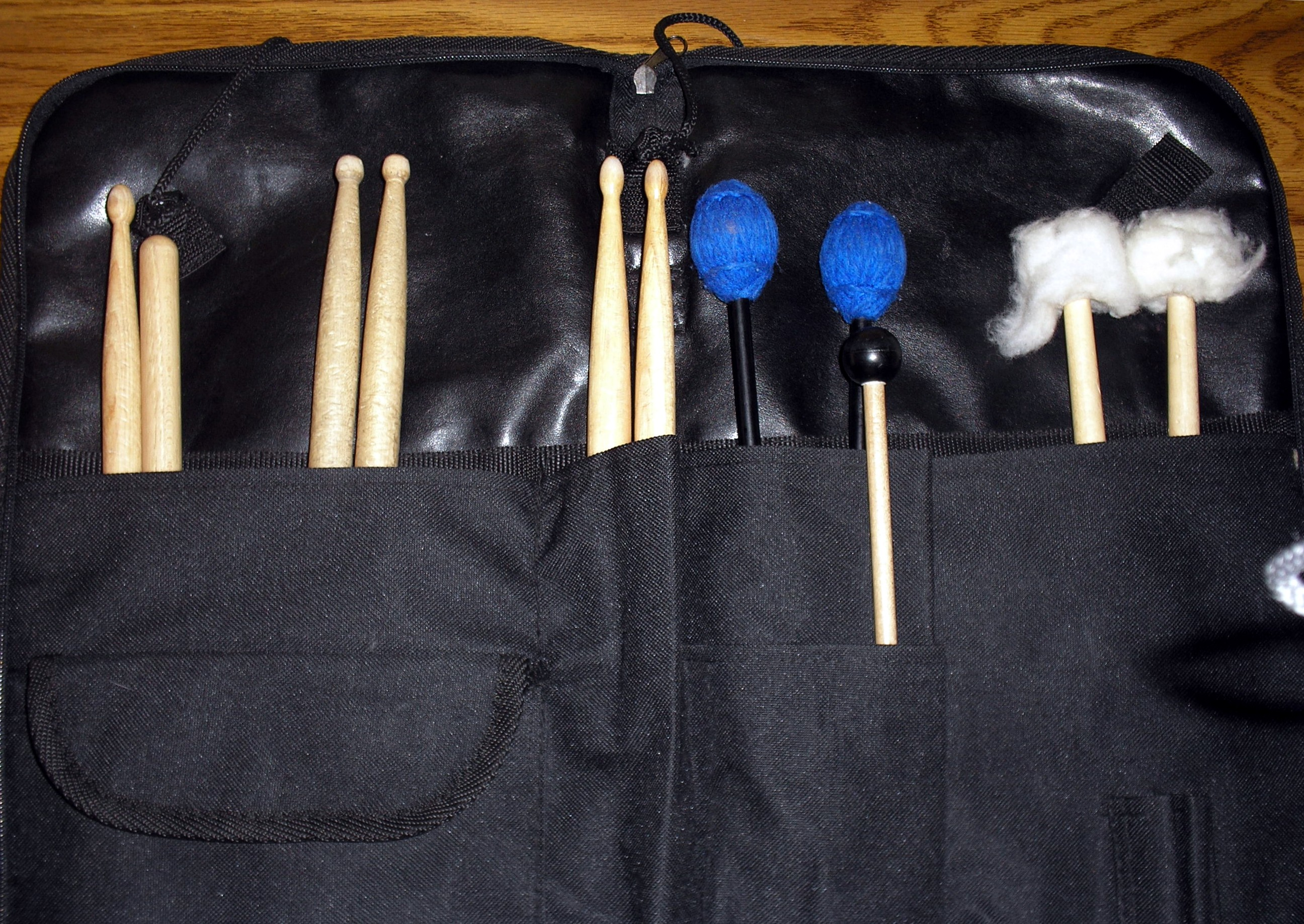
Mallet bag showing variety of mallets

A percussion mallet is an object used to strike a percussion instrument to produce its sound. A mallet is normally held in the hand while a may be manually operated, as in the striker for a triangle, or mechanically, such a bass drum pedal. The term drum stick is applied to a wide range of beaters. Some mallets or beaters are normally used only with a specific instrument, while others are used on many different instruments. Often, mallets of differing material and hardness are used to create different timbres on the same types of instrument (e.g. using either wooden or yarn mallets on a xylophone).

Some mallets, such as vibraphone mallets, are normally just called mallets; others have more specialized names, including:

- Drum sticks, of many types, some used with a wide variety of instruments.
- Rutes, used with many instruments.
- Brushes, used particularly with snare drum but also with many other instruments.
- Tippers used to strike a bodhrán.
- Bachi, used with Japanese taiko drums.
- Hammers, used to strike tubular bells.

== Types ==
=== Drum sticks ===
Drum sticks are beaters normally used in pairs, with each held in one hand, and are similar to or derived from the snare drum sticks that were subsequently adopted for kit drumming.

They are the most general-purpose beaters, and the term covers a wide variety of beaters, but they are mainly used for untuned percussion.

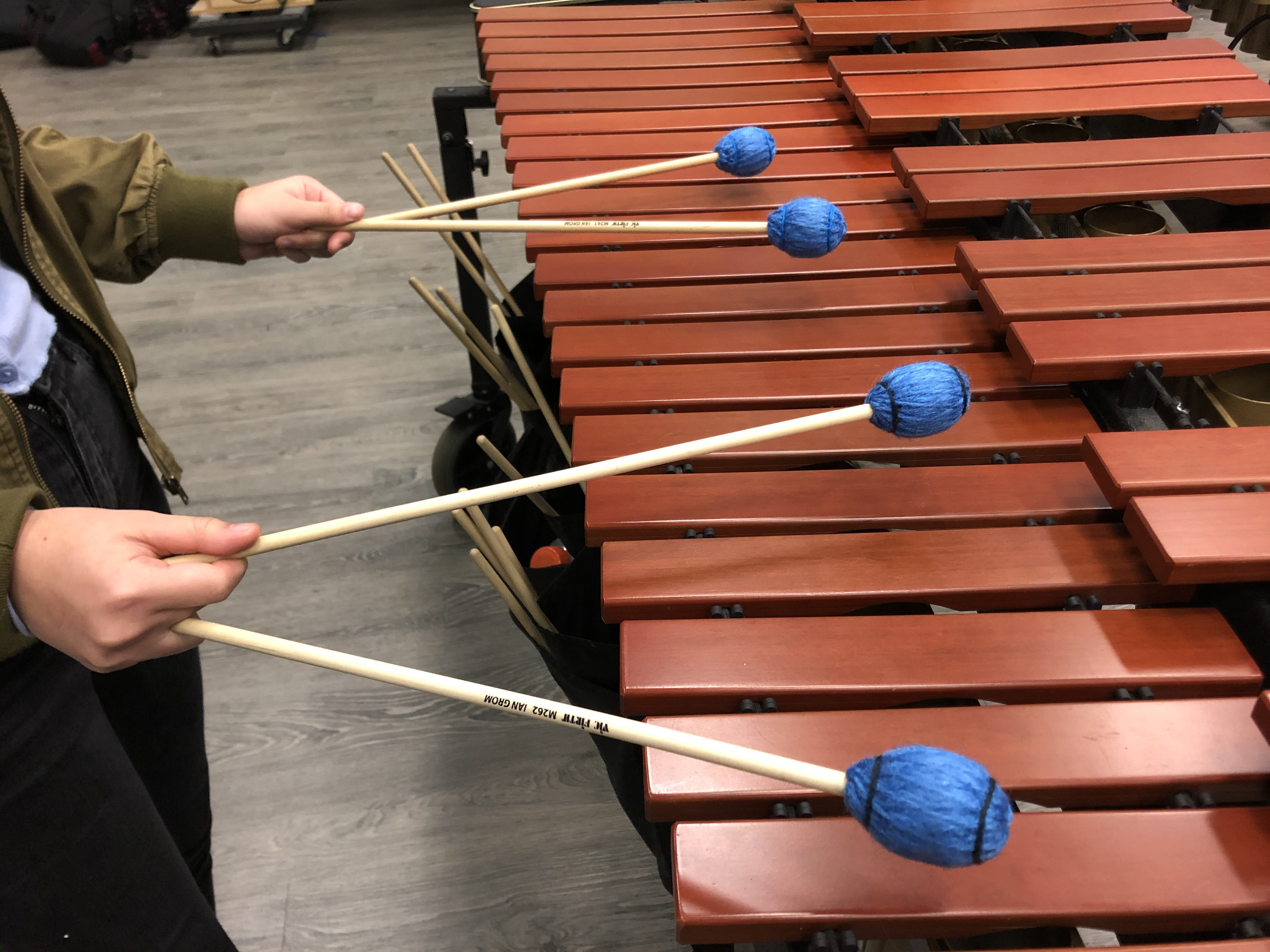
Synthetic yarn mallets held in Stevens Grip

=== Mallets ===
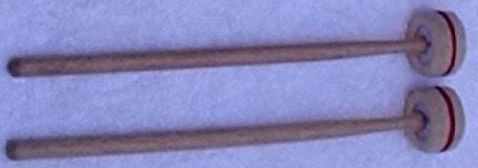
Cartwheel mallets with wooden shafts and heads of felt held between steel washers

As well as being a general term for a hand-held beater, mallet is also used specifically to refer to a hand-held beater comprising a head connected to a thin shaft, and used in pairs. These are available in a variety of configurations needed to create a desired sound, articulation, character, and dynamic for a piece being played.

There are three main types:

- Unwrapped mallets, used on glockenspiel, xylophone, and other instruments with keys made of durable material, have heads made of brass, rubber, nylon, acrylic, wood, or other hard materials.
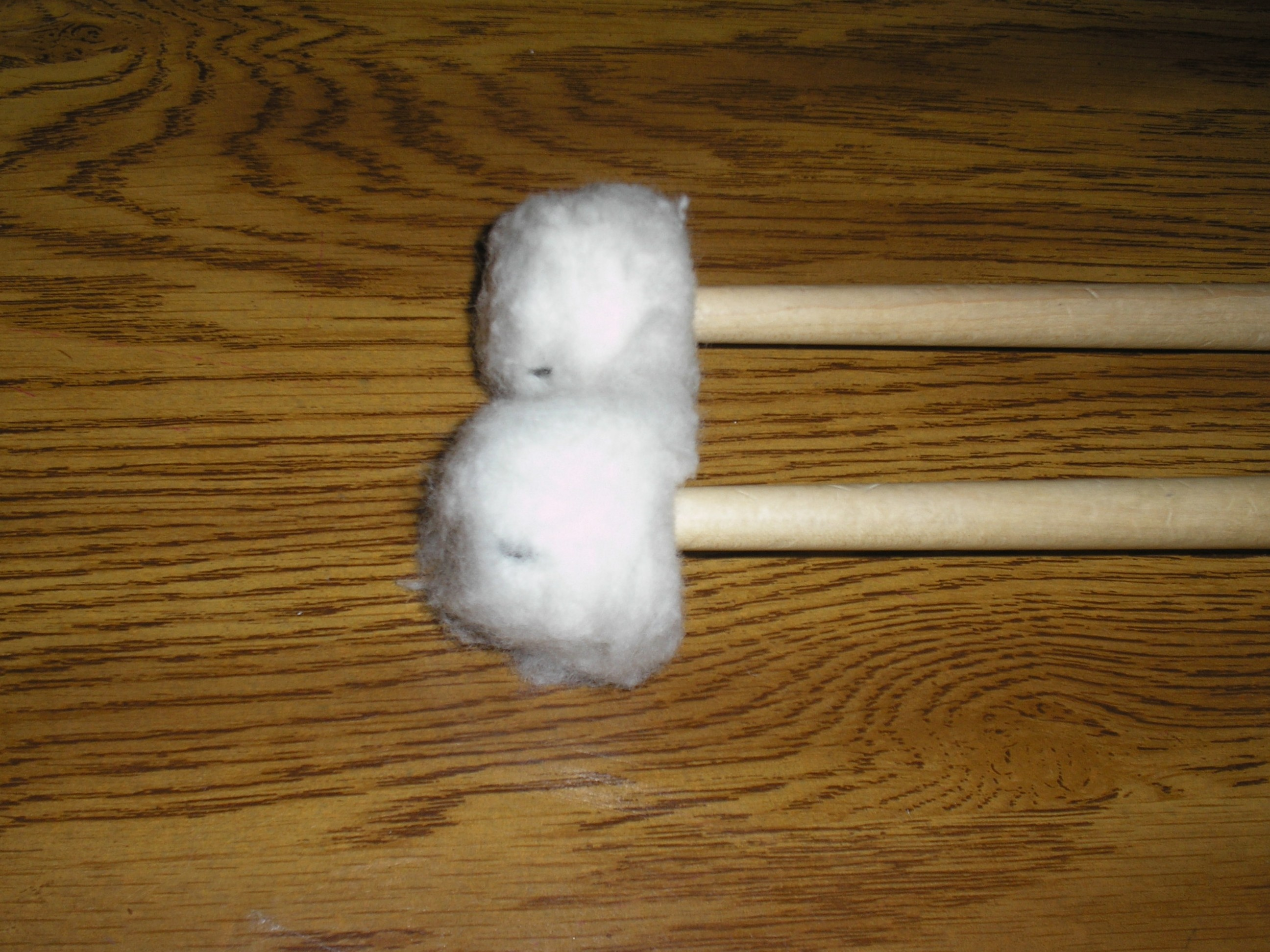
  Timpani mallets
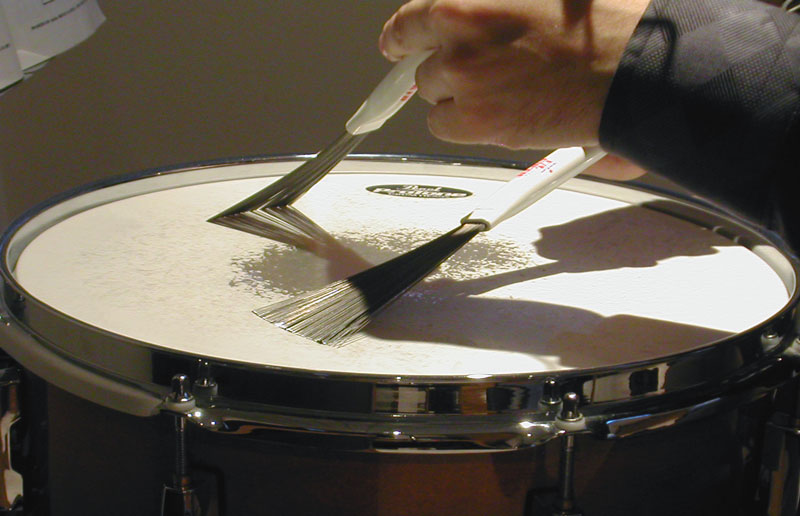
  Brushes in use on a snare drum
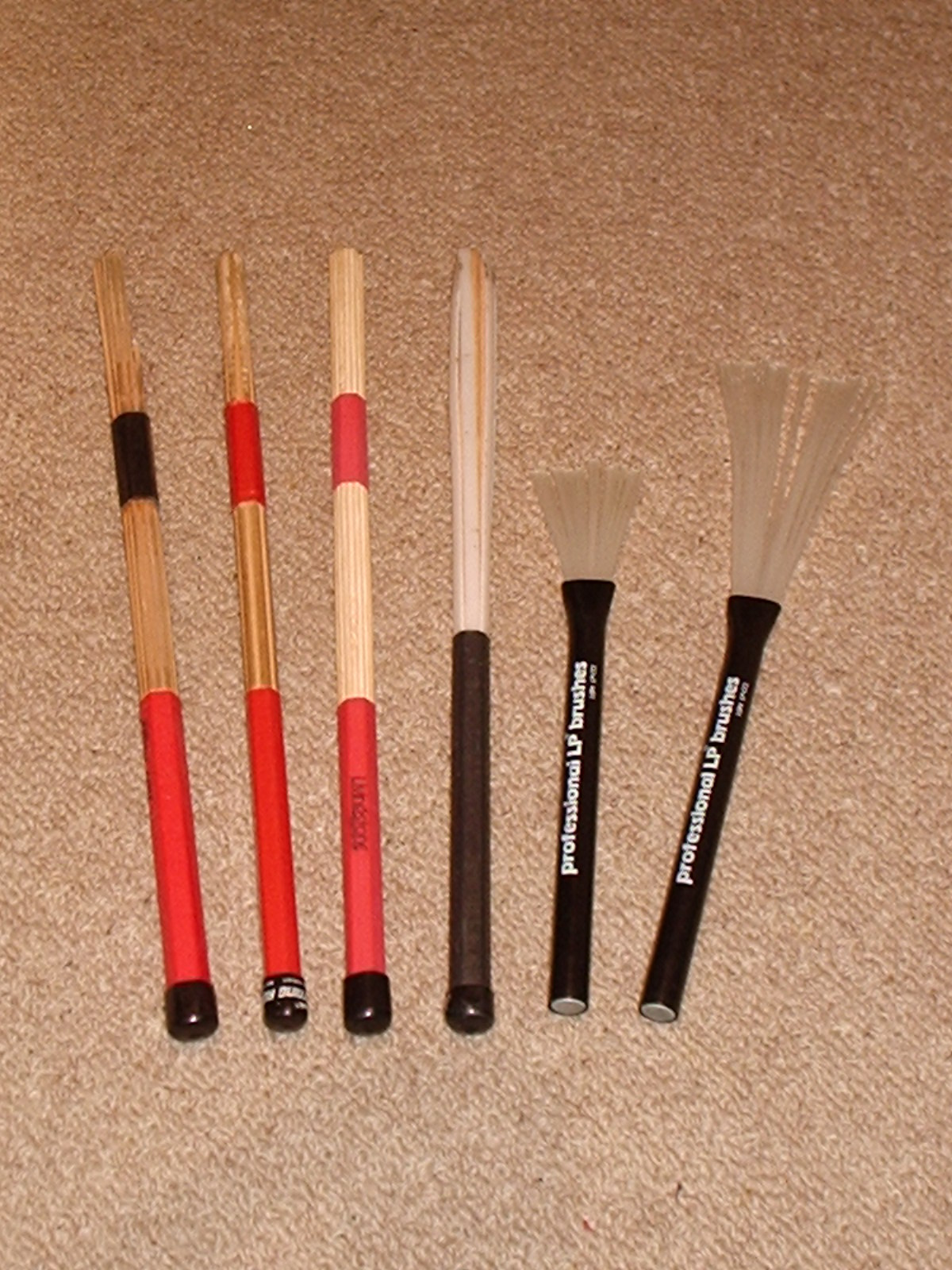
  Rutes and nylon brushes
- Wrapped mallets, mostly used on marimba, vibraphone, and other instruments with softer keys (though they can be used on more durable instruments as well), have heads of kelon, rubber, nylon, acrylic, or other medium-hard materials wrapped in softer materials like yarn, cord or latex. Wrapped mallets are also the mallets of choice to play suspended cymbal, though drum set players will typically use drum sticks instead.
- Felt mallets or cartwheel mallets have heads composed of layers of felt, held between two steel washers. They are mainly used on untuned percussion as well as on timpani.

Mallet shafts are commonly made of rattan, birch, or synthetic materials such as fibreglass. Birch is stiff and typically longer, while rattan is a more flexible shaft and gives a more open sound. Fiberglass is ideal for playing lightly on an instrument because it is easy to control.

Different mallets are used primarily to alter the timbre of the mallet instrument being played. Generally, mallets composed of softer materials will stick to the instrument for longer before they bounce off of it, which gives a deeper sound made up of lower frequencies. Harder materials tend to stick less and rebound faster, and tend to be able to excite more of the higher frequencies, giving the sound a higher pitch with more overtones. The choice of a mallet is typically left up to the performer, though some compositions specify if a certain sound is desired by the composer.

Players frequently employ two mallets in a matched grip or four mallets in a four-mallet grip; however, the use of up to six mallets is not uncommon. More than two mallets may be used even when no chords are called for by the composer so that the performer has a wider range of timbres from which to select or to facilitate the performance of music that moves rapidly between high and low, and if hit properly can switch between the two pitches.

If the mallet is too hard, the instrument may be damaged. For example, on rosewood marimbas, certain mallets may be too hard, increasing the risk of a cracked bar.

=== Brushes ===
Brushes are a set of bristles connected to a handle so that the bristles make a rounded fan shape. Brushes can produce a sound that is softer and more subdued than drum sticks or other mallets, and can be rubbed against a drum head to produce a continuous "swishing" sound.

The bristles can be made of metal or plastic; the handles are commonly made of wood or aluminum and are often coated with rubber. The fan made by the bristles can be of variable length, width, and density, and some brushes are telescoping, allowing their sound to be altered by pulling the bristles inside a hollow handle. Retracting the bristles also protects the brush when it is not in use. The non-bristled end of the brush may end in a loop or a ball.

Brushes are often used in jazz or blues music, but also occasionally found in other genres such as rock, country, and pop.

=== Rutes ===
A rute or multi-rod consists of several thin sticks that are bound together to form one stick. Its sound is midway between a stick and a brush.

Long used in orchestral music, in the mid-20th century routes also became popular for many other purposes including kit drumming and bodhrán.

By dissipating much of the energy of the stroke within the stick, a rute allows a drummer to achieve both a tone and a playing action that would normally be associated with a quite loud playing, but at a moderate or even low volume. The tone produced by many can be adjusted by adjusting the position of one of the bands holding the bundle together.

=== Further Implements ===
Contemporary experimental music practice has developed a whole range of other types of mallets and excitation devices, including superballs, cluster mallets, or rasping sticks. Vibrating devices such as electric toothbrushes and milk frothers are also used.

== Major percussion mallet companies ==
- Vic Firth
- Vater
- Regal Tip
- Pro-Mark
- Ayotte Drums
- Innovative Percussion

== See also ==
- Grip (percussion).
