= Taper (cymbal) =

In cymbal making, taper refers to the gradual change in thickness from the bell to the rim of the cymbal. It is one of the key features that determines the tone of the cymbal.

This change is typically not uniform, and it is extremely difficult to generalise on the effects of taper, just to say that they are profound. Crash cymbals tend to have the most pronounced taper, with the faster crashes and the richer tones the most pronounced of all. The bell of a paperthin crash or a fast crash can be thicker than that of many ride cymbals. On the other hand, china cymbals tend to have little or no taper, as do the heavy to medium weights of splash cymbals.
