= List of cymbal manufacturers =

List of manufacturers

Cymbal manufacturers refer to companies and/or individuals who primarily manufacture and/or ship cymbals, bells, gongs, or any other metallic percussion item of that type, be it B8 or B20, mass-produced or boutique, ride, crash, splash, or hi-hat, for use by percussionists, drummers, and other musicians.

== "The Big Four": Major cymbal manufacturers ==
In the modern world, there are four primary cymbal manufacturers that together encompass over half of all cymbal sales.

- Zildjian
- Meinl Percussion
- Paiste
- Sabian

== Other cymbal manufacturers ==
Aside from the four major contenders in the cymbal world, there are many more companies, especially in Turkey, where some share roots in the old Istanbul based Zildjian factory. Today's cymbal manufacturers have established themselves through unique manufacturing techniques, unusual sound qualities, competitive pricing, place or style of manufacturing, or cymbal material. Other notable cymbal companies are:

- Agean Cymbals
- Amedia Cymbals
- Anatolian Cymbals
- Arborea Cymbals
- Big Island Cymbals
- Bosphorus Cymbals
- Crescent
- Diril Cymbals
- Domene Cymbals
- Dream Cymbals
- Fame Cymbals
- Funch Cymbals
- GM Design Custom Cymbals
- Hammerax
- Istanbul Agop
- Istanbul Mehmet
- Kamin Cymbals
- Kmicic cymbals
- PGB Cymbals
- Rech Cymbals
- Reverie Cymbals
- Royal Cymbals
- Koide Cymbals
- Oliver Kern Cymbals
- JD Sagurton Custom Cymbals
- Saluda Cymbals
- Stagg
- Soultone Cymbals
- Timothy Roberts Cymbals
- Turkish Cymbals
- Zhangqiu Tongxiang cymbals
- Trexist Cymbals
- T-Cymbals Cymbals
- UFIP
- Nebulae Cymbals
- Zilco
- Zultan Cymbals
- ZYN Cymbals
- Mehteran Cymbals
- Wuhan Cymbals

Other minor brands and individual cymbal makers make their own cymbals or rework existing cymbals.

== Notable past cymbal manufacturers/smiths ==
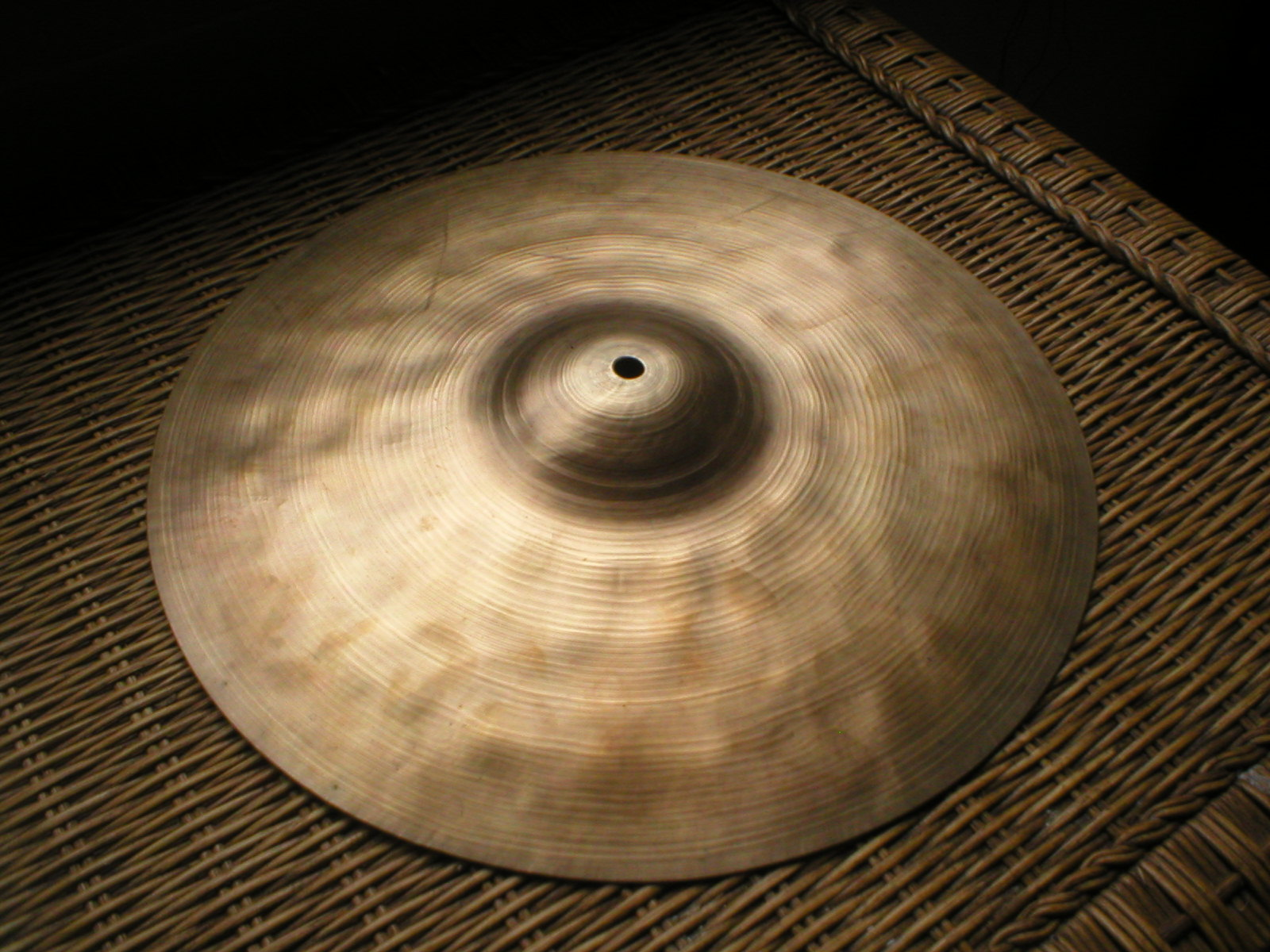
Bellotti cymbal with typical hammered pattern

=== Bellotti Cymbals ===
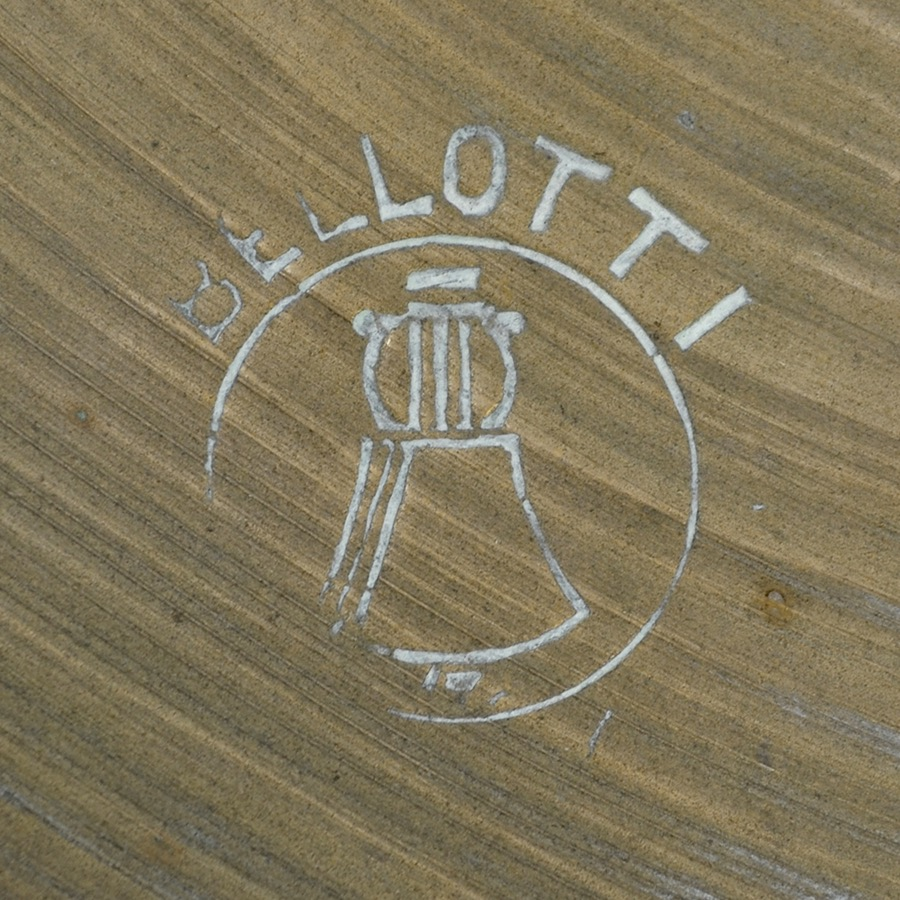
A stamp from a 1950s-era Bellotti Cymbal

Bellotti was a small Italian cymbal workshop that produced cymbals from the 1950s until the 1970s.

Because so few of these vintage cymbals exist on the market today (they are much less prevalent that some other vintage Italian contemporaries, such as Zanchi), Bellotti remains one of the more obscure names in cymbal manufacturers. Most Bellottis are relatively small 12"-15", and quite heavy. Their craftsmanship displays a fine lathing on top and bottom and very broad, circular-peen hand-hammering. The cast bronze cymbals are of a B20 alloy. The bellholes of most Bellottis are of small aperture, which suggests a fabrication date prior to the 1960s. Very finely crafted, most existing examples are likely to have been hand or field cymbals, due both to their weight and diameters.

The tell-tale insignia is an embossed stamp on the underside of the cymbal. There are two versions of this stamp. The first simply reads "Bellotti" on capital block letters. The second version also reads "Bellotti," but also incorporates the logo of a bell. Often, Bellottis have embossing that reads "Italy" or "Made in Italy" in a semicircular pattern. This embossing appears on other Italian cymbals of the 1940s-1960s.

=== Roberto Spizzichino ===
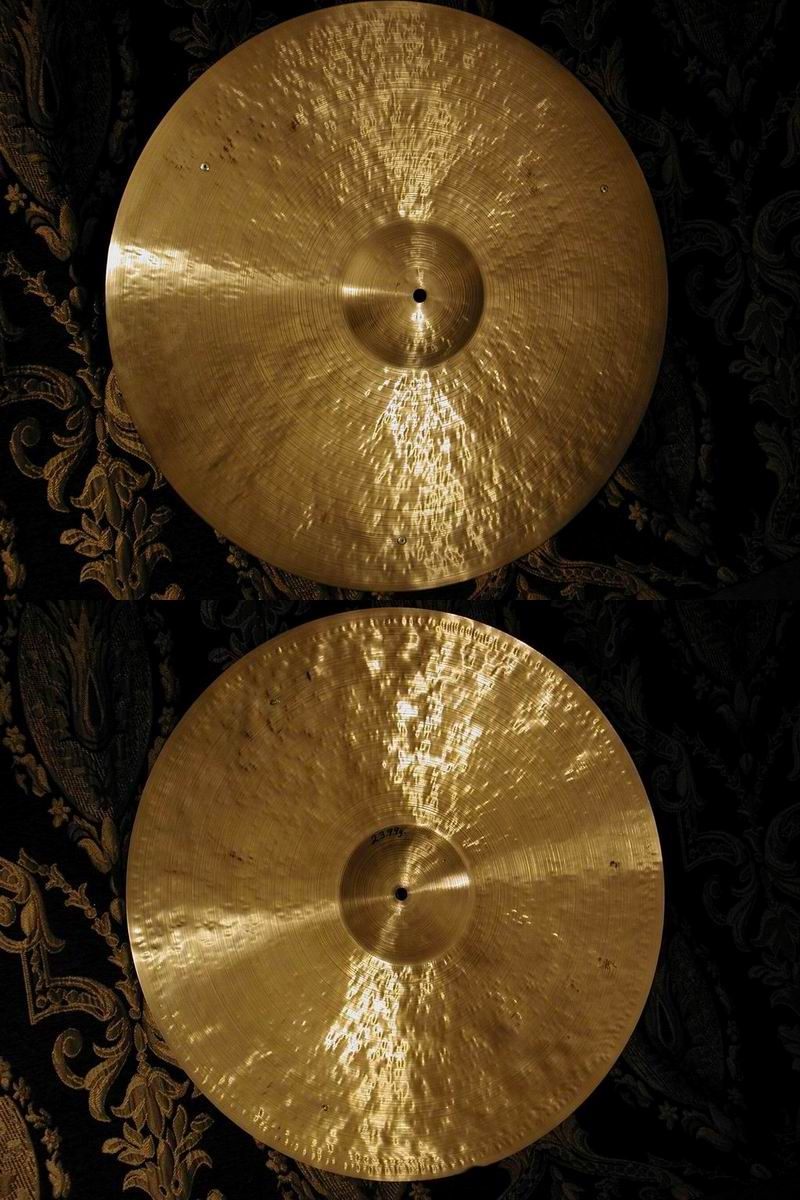
22" Spizzichino ride

Roberto Spizzichino (1944–2011) was an Italian jazz drummer and renowned master cymbalsmith. Spizzichino lathed and hand-hammered cymbals in his workshop in San Quirico, Tuscany in the tradition of the K Zildjian cymbal makers from Istanbul.

Early in his career, Spizzichino worked for the Italian cymbal company UFIP, providing cymbal development and research. In 1986, after leaving UFIP, Spizzichino started experimenting with his own "Spizz" brand cymbals. Spizzichino also worked for Bespeco, an Italian musical equipment manufacturer. Bespeco still offers a line of machine-made B8 Spizz brand cymbals produced according to a process developed by Spizzichino. The Chinese cymbal manufacturer, Wuhan, also produced a limited number of its own Spizz brand cymbals during a brief collaboration in 1989 when Spizzichino visited the factory. He was in China to find a source for B20 blanks. Spizzichino was involved in the Wuhan/Spizz cymbals' design but was not involved with the cymbal production and distribution. He was not satisfied with the product and did not wish to be associated with it. Neither the Bespeco Spizz or the Wuhan/Spizz cymbals were endorsed by Spizzichino.

Recent Spizzichino brand cymbals are crafted from high quality B20 bell bronze discs sourced from Turkey. The first Spizzichinos were made from inexpensive, heavy B20 blanks imported from China. By heating, hand-hammering and lathing the material, Spizzichino sought to bring out desirable sound characteristics often lacking in machine-made modern cymbals. Spizzichino became unsatisfied with the purity of the Chinese material after a couple years, and found a different supplier.

Roberto Spizzichino's cymbals are coveted by jazz drummers seeking the 'old K sound' and are considered rare and collectable, as he made fewer than 3,500 cymbals during his career.

Spizzichino died on November 22, 2011.

=== Zyn, Super Zyn & 5 Star Super Zyn ===
Zyn cymbals were introduced by Premier Percussion in 1948. They were marketed as affordable instruments with a priority of functionality over musical quality. They were made of nickel-silver alloy and could be purchased with Premier's Olympic-series drum kits. Pairs of concert cymbals were available for marching bands and orchestra.

The professional-grade Super Zyn range followed in 1951, realised in B20 alloy. According to Cymbals Today (a contemporary promotional material published by Premier), these instruments were endorsed by a number of professional jazz drummers, such as Ray Ellington and Eric Delaney. Sizes were 12 inches through 24 inches, in thin, medium-thin, medium or heavy weights. Concert cymbals were available in 14, 15 and 16 inch pairs.

The 5 Star Super Zyn range was announced in 1968, replacing the Super Zyn as Premier's professional-grade cymbal. Like their predecessors, these cymbals were also made of B20 alloy. However, their build was thicker and heavier - similar to the heavy-weight Super Zyns - reflecting contemporary trends in popular music, where denser cymbals were required to meet the increasing volume of amplified instruments in popular music. The range began with a 12-inch cymbal, while hi-hats could be specified in 13, 14 or 15 inch pairs. 16, 18, 20 and 22 inch cymbals were all available as a ride, crash, or crash-ride. Sizzle cymbals (factory-fitted with rivets), could be ordered in 18 and 20 inch sizes. Concert cymbals were available in 14, 15 and 16 inch pairs.

There was also a budget alternative to the 5 Star Super Zyn, called the 2 Star Super Zyn. The naming system was a reference to the contemporary octane rating system for leaded petrol in the UK.

Premier also marketed a Zyn 70.

Production of all Zyn types concluded in 1984, replaced by Premier's then-expanding distribution and promotion of Zildjian cymbals. However, the name has since been revived on two occasions, first in the late 1990s with a German-made Zyn. All previous Zyn cymbals featured stamped logos but the Made in Germany Zyn title was stencilled in capital letters. The range consisted of just four cymbal types: pairs of 14 inch hi-hats, 20 inch Medium Ride, plus 16 and 18 inch Crash cymbals. Unlike previous Zyns, there were no concert cymbals or Super Zyn variants marketed on this occasion.

The second and final reintroduction was announced by Premier in 2006: the new Zyn was machine-hammered B20 alloy, while the new Super Zyn was combination hand- and machine-hammered B20 alloy. Both types were made in China and can be identified by their stencilled nametag (distinct from the stencilling of the German-made Zyn range). As with past Zyns, pairs of concert cymbals were also available. Unfortunately, the revival was commercially unsuccessful and the cymbals were only produced for a short period of time.

== See also ==
- List of drum manufacturers
- List of timpani manufacturers
