= Bell plate =

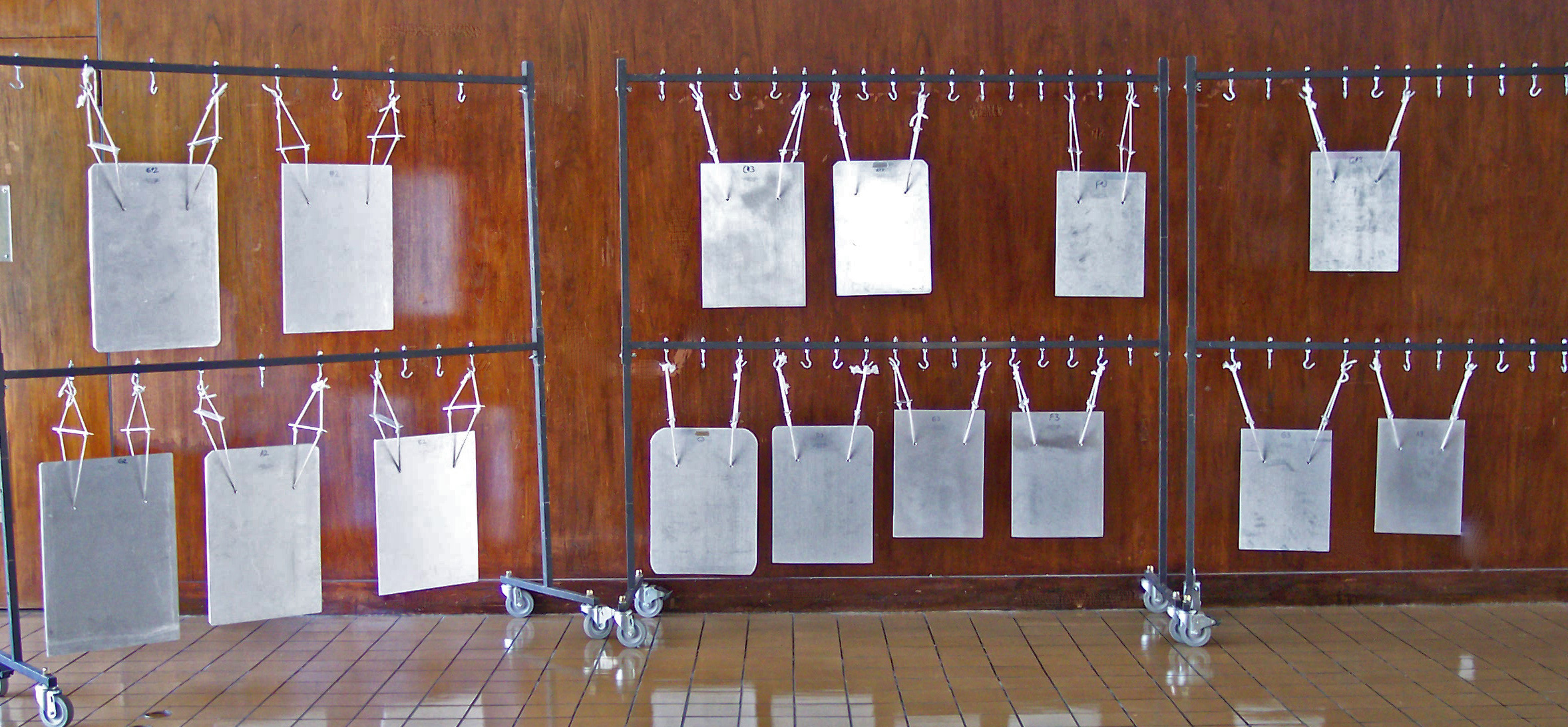
- A set of suspended bell plates.

Percussion instrument
- Classification: Idiophone; Metallophone
- Hornbostel–Sachs classification: 111.222 (Sets of percussion plaques)
- Developed: Asia

Playing range
- Varies

Related instruments
- Bell

Builders
- Matt Nolan Custom, UFIP, Paiste, Zildjian, Maurice Davies, L.A. Percussion Rentals

A bell plate is a percussion instrument consisting of a flat and fairly thick sheet of metal, producing a sound similar to a bell. They are most often used in orchestral and theater music.

== History ==
Bell plates were first developed and implemented as percussion instruments in ancient Asia, but did not enter into Western music until the late 19th century. This instrument then became popular, particularly in theater music, in the early 20th century.

== Construction ==
Bell plates are made of sheets of aluminium, steel or bronze, ranging in size from 100 by 74 centimetres (39 by 29 in) and 30 kilograms (66 lb) (bronze) to 28 by 25 centimetres (11.0 by 9.8 in) and 1 kilogram (2.2 lb) (aluminium).

While normal bell plates are suspended from a pair of holes in the corners (going through a node so as not to influence its sound), the variation of the bell plate known as the Burma bell, a distinctively shaped bell plate, is often mounted using a single hole, allowing it to spin when struck, producing Doppler effects.

The range of the instrument typically covers 4 octaves in the form of a C-major scale, totaling 29 total plates. However, different sets may contain different combinations of plates according to the needs of the owner. The plates are typically suspended from a semicircular frame and are occasionally fitted with resonators to enhance volume and the sounding of low partials.

== Playing techniques ==
Bell plates can be played while suspended from a stand or while held in one hand of the performer depending on the number of different plates needed for a specific performance. If only one plate is needed, then the performer will simply hold that specific plate with one hand and strike it with the other. This plate can be kept on a table covered with a towel or carpet square while not being played. If the performance requires several plates to be played in succession, then the plates should be suspended from a stand. The player then strikes the plates with a wooden, hard plastic, or metal mallet which can be covered in varying thicknesses of felt to create a variety of sounds. A softer mallet, which has a thicker felt covering, can achieve a greater sounding of the fundamental pitch of the plate, while a harder mallet with a thinner covering of felt will produce stronger overtones and possibly overshadow the fundamental pitch of the plate. The sound can also be manipulated by striking different areas of the plate. Greater volume can be achieved by striking the center of the lower or upper third of the instrument, and a clearer pitch can be produced by striking the plate at the center or near the bottom edge. The bell plates may be dampened with the player's hand or with the mallet to quicken or immediately cut off the decay of the sound after striking.

== Works ==
The following works feature bell plates:

- Puccini, Tosca (1900) (plates used: E, F, B♭, F)
- Verdi, Il Trovator (1853) (plates used: death knell in E♭)
- Pfitzner, Palestrina (1917) (plates used: F♯, G, C, E)
- Pfitzner, Von deutscher Seele (two low bell plates of any pitch)
- Strauss, Also sprach Zaruthustra (1896) (plates used: E)
- Strauss, Friedenstag (1938) (plates used: C, E♭, A, E♭, G)
- Mahler, Symphony No. 9 (1909) (plates used: F♯, A, B)
- Janáček, Out of a Death House (1927)
- Webern, Six Pieces for Orchestra, Op. 6 (1909–10, revised 1928) (low bells of unspecified pitch)
- Boulez, pli selon pli (1957-1960)
- Schönberg, Die glűckliche Hand, Op. 18 (1910-1913) (tremolo on a low bell as a sound effect)
- Tamburo, Plays Metal (2020) (B Major Pentatonic Plates in Just Intonation)

== Makers ==
- Alexander Zhikharev
- Matt Nolan Custom
- UFIP
- Paiste
- Zildjian
- Maurice Davies

== See also ==
- Belleplate
- Loh tarang
- Bell (instrument)
- Chimes
- Thunder sheet
