= Istanbul Agop Cymbals =

Turkish cymbal producer

Istanbul Agop
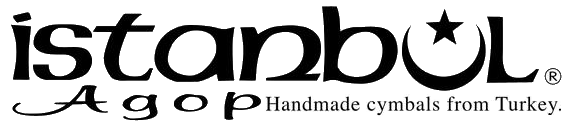
- Company type: Private
- Industry: Musical instruments
- Founded: 1980; 46 years ago in Istanbul, Turkey
- Founder: Agop Tomurcuk
- Headquarters: Istanbul, Turkey
- Key people: Agop Tomurcuk, Arman Tomurcuk, Serkis Tomurcuk, Mel Lewis
- Products: Cymbals
- Website: istanbulcymbals.com

Istanbul Agop Cymbals is a cymbal producer based in Turkey. Its products are well respected for their unique sound, which is formed by the method and the alloy used, the formula of which is known only to the owners of the firm, Armenians Arman and Sarkis Tomurcuk. It is one of two companies that formed after the split of Istanbul Cymbals.

== History ==
The art of Turkish cymbal making dates back to the 16th century, the time of the Ottoman Empire. The very first cymbals manufactured in Turkey were actually bells, created for the use in churches. Later on, as the story goes, cymbals were produced for the Ottoman military band. In the 20th century, it had become well known that Istanbul had evolved into the cymbal-making capital of the world. Generations of master cymbal smiths developed, refined, and redefined this art in their endless search for perfection. They formulated the most musical alloy and developed and tested hand-crafting methods which had been used for centuries. As the 20th century drew to its close, the traditional Turkish method for handcrafting cymbals had all but been abandoned due to the efficiencies and mass production facility provided by machines. In 1980, the first Istanbul Cymbals began to be produced by Agop Tomurcuk, who had been working in the business of hand-made cymbal manufacture since the age of nine and had worked at the only cymbal factory in Turkey becoming the chief cymbal smith until the factory's closure in 1977. Agop's friend and partner Mehmet Tamdeger established Zilciler Kollektif Sti and chose "Zilciler" as their brand name. Shortly afterwards the brand name was changed to Istanbul.

The following years saw continued development of new designs that tried to maintain traditional methods. In 1996, Agop Tomurcuk died in an accident, and as a result the company began to be pulled in two separate directions. It was determined that the company must be split between Agop's sons, Arman and Sarkis—who continued in the tradition of their father—and Mehmet, who started his own separate company.

== Brands ==
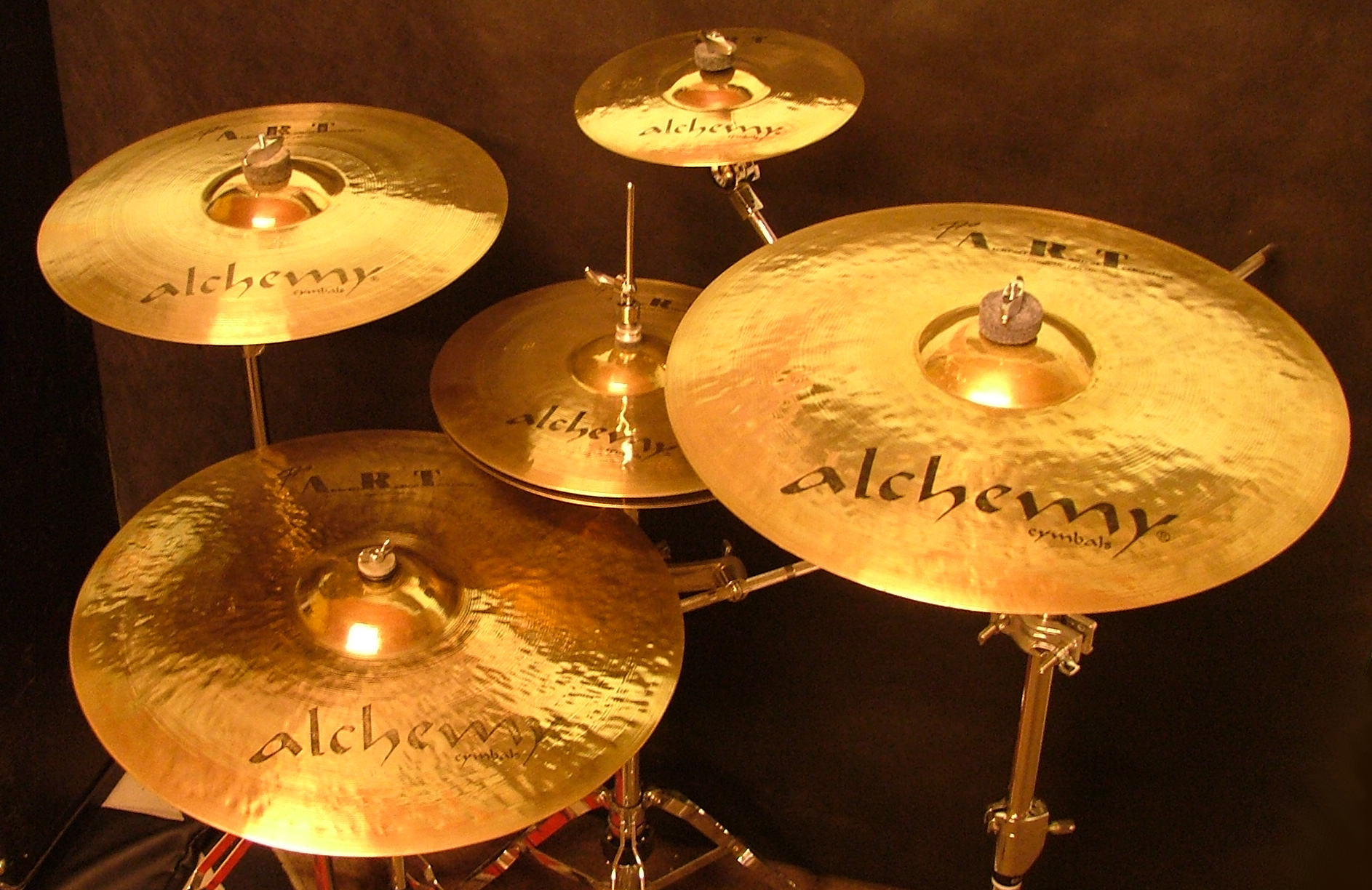
Various Alchemy cymbals

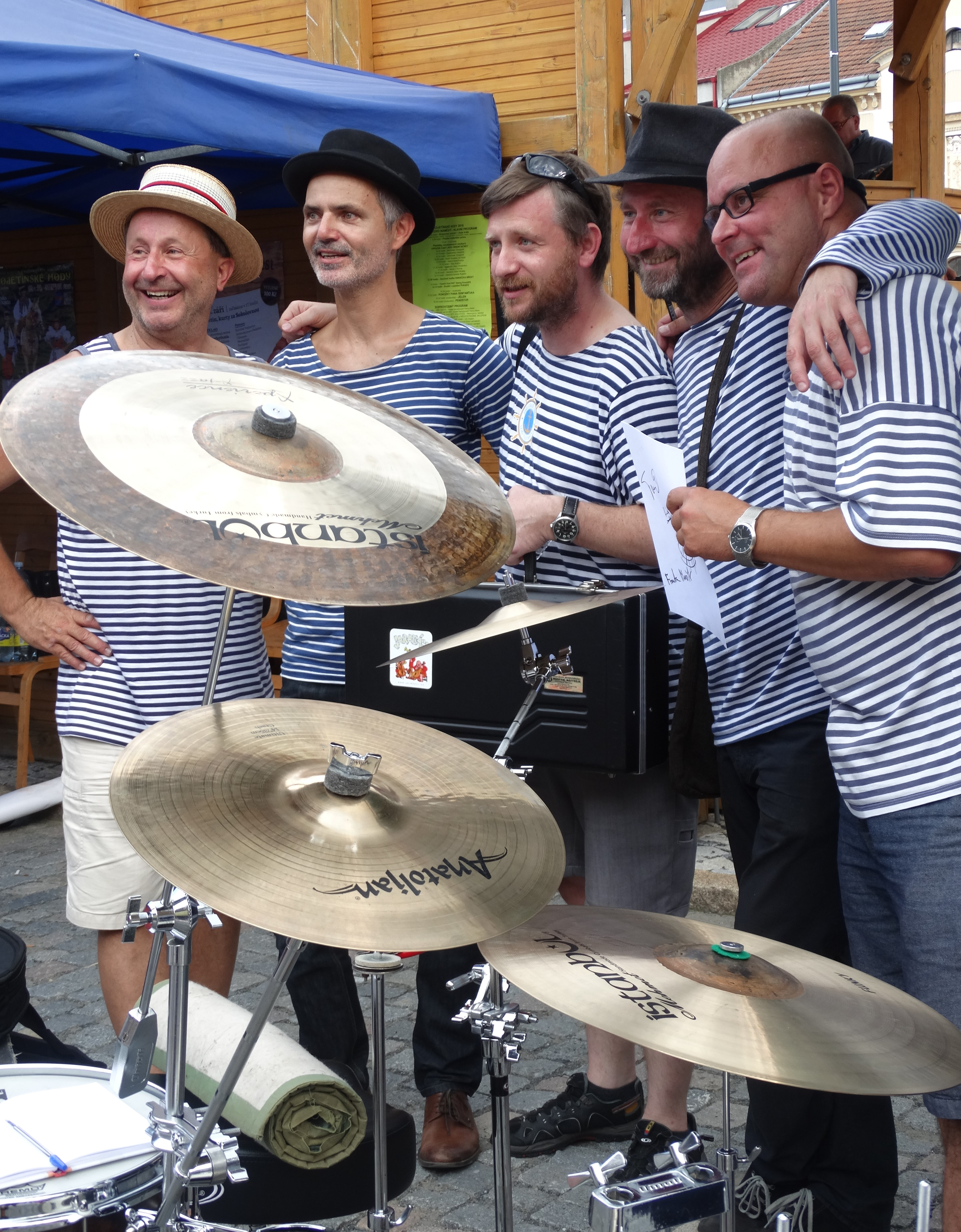
Various Istanbul cymbals

"Alchemy Cymbals" is a brand of hand-made cymbals belonging to Istanbul Agop; the brand has its own production line. The main difference between Istanbul Agop and Alchemy Cymbals is the finishing process. Alchemy Cymbals also has low-cost cymbals in its production line for beginners and semi-professionals.

Some of their lines have been designed in collaboration with notable professional drummers, including Mel Lewis, Cindy Blackman, and Lenny White.

== Endorsers ==
Many prominent drummers of multiple well-known bands, as well as many younger contemporary players all spanning multiple genres from rock to jazz and indie to heavy metal all endorse the brand including:

- Mel Lewis of Stan Kenton and Woody Herman
- Jimmy Chamberlin of The Smashing Pumpkins
- Zac Farro of Paramore
- Cindy Blackman and Michael Shrieve of Santana
- Joey Waronker of Beck
- Jeremy Stacey of King Crimson
- Mark Pontius of Foster the People
- Michael Iveson of Gotye
- Jarrod Alexander of My Chemical Romance
- Aaron Sterling of John Mayer
- Mike Clark of Herbie Hancock
- James Gadson of Bill Withers and Herbie Hancock
- Christopher Guanlao of Silversun Pickups
- Lenny White of Return to Forever
- George Sluppick of Chris Robinson
- Brooks Wackerman of Avenged Sevenfold
- Jeremy Gara of Arcade Fire
- Darren King of Mutemath
- Morgan Agren of Frank Zappa
- Andrew Marshall of Billie Eilish
- Brendan Canty of Fugazi
- Matthew McDonough of Mudvayne
- Witold Kieltyka of Decapitated
- Moses Archuleta of Deerhunter
- Kliph Scurlock of The Flaming Lips
- Alexei Rodriguez of 3 Inches of Blood
- James Culpepper of Flyleaf
- Joe Plummer of The Shins
- Charlie Hall of The War on Drugs
- Erce Arslan of Kimaera
- Yussef Dayes of Yussef Kamaal
- Kerem Kabadayı of Mor ve Ötesi
- Jeremiah Green of Modest Mouse
- Dan Bailey of Father John Misty
- Joe Russo of Furthur
- Paulo Baldi of Cake
- Blair Sinta of Cyndi Lauper
- Scott Amendola of the Scott Amendola Band
- Brian Vodinh of 10 Years
- Brian Griffin of Taylor Hicks
- Adam Patterson of The Expendables
- Cengiz Baysal, session great
- Amber Baker, session great
- Ferit Odman, jazz great
- Idris Muhammad, jazz great
- Franklin Kiermyer, jazz great
- II of Sleep Token
- Ronnie Vannucci Jr. of The Killers
- Sarab Singh of MUNA
- Gaël Féret of Misanthrope
- Stella Mozgawa of Warpaint

== See also ==
- List of cymbal manufacturers
- Cymbal making
