= Gong =

Percussion instrument

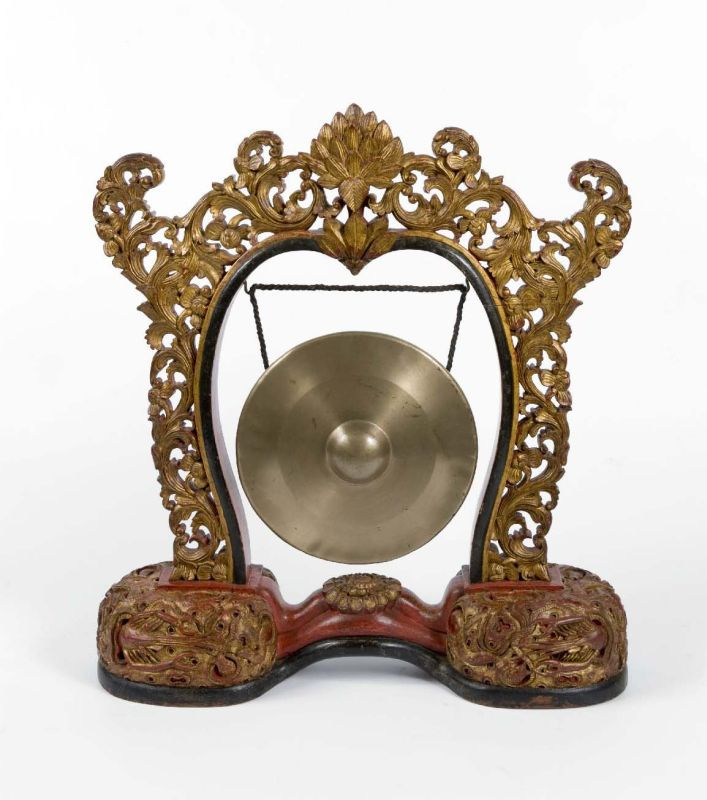
- One of Javanese and Balinese style gong for gamelan ensemble, hanging in an ornate frame
- Classification: Metallophone

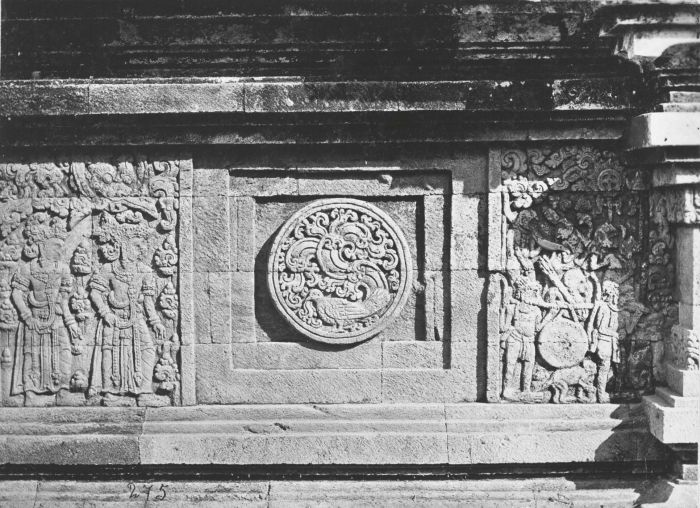
Two men (right) are lifting the gong depicted on the 13th-century temple reliefs at the Candi Induk, Panataran temple complex in East Java, Indonesia

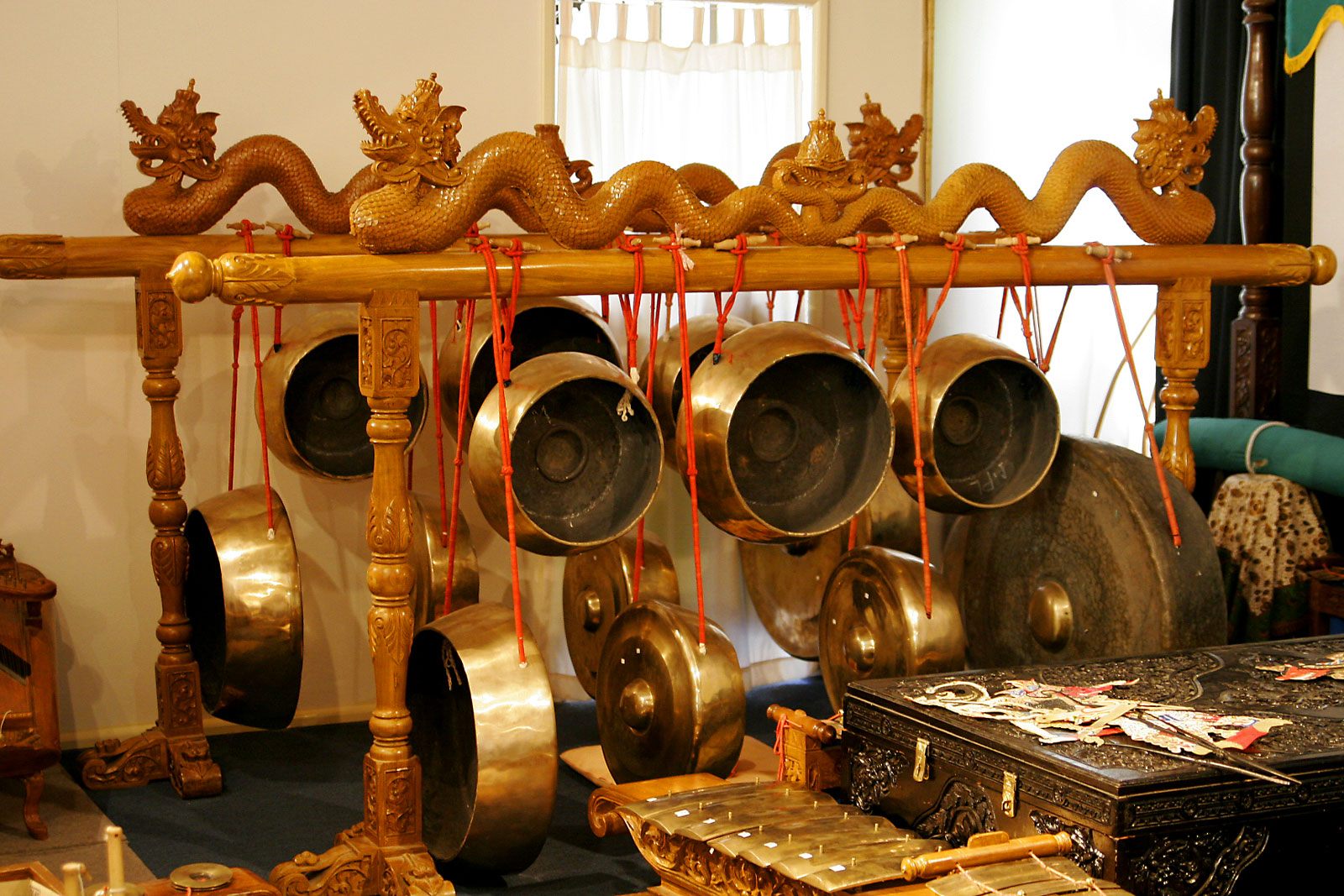
A gong collection in a gamelan ensemble of instruments – Indonesian Embassy Canberra

A gong (Note: From Indonesian and Malay: gong; Javanese: ꦒꦺꦴꦁ gong; Chinese: 鑼; pinyin: luó; Japanese: 銅鑼(どら), romanized: dora; Khmer: គង kong; Thai: ฆ้อง khong; Vietnamese: cồng chiêng; Assamese: কাঁহ kãh) is a percussion instrument originating from Southeast Asia, and used widely in Southeast Asian and East Asian musical traditions. Gongs are made of metal and are circular and flat or bowl-like in shape, and can come in various sizes. They are typically struck with a mallet. They can be played alone, giving a characteristic "crashing" sound, or played as part of a tuned set that produce bell-like sounds.

The earliest possible depictions of gongs is from the details on the surface of the Ngọc Lũ I bronze drum (c. 3rd to 2nd century BC) from the Dong Son culture of northern Vietnam. It depicts what looks like seven-gong ensembles along with other instruments (including cymbals/bells and the bronze drums themselves). The oldest undisputed historical mention of gongs can be found in sixth century AD Chinese records, which mentioned it as a foreign instrument that came from a country between Tibet and Burma. The term gong (Javanese: ꦒꦺꦴꦁ) originated in the Indonesian island of Java. Scientific and archaeological research has established that Annam, Java, Burma, and Southern China were the four main gong manufacturing centres of the ancient world. The gong found its way into the Western World in the 18th century, when it was also used in the percussion section of a Western-style symphony orchestra. A form of bronze cauldron gong known as a resting bell was widely used in ancient Greece and Rome: for instance in the famous Oracle of Dodona, where disc gongs were also used.

Gongs generally fall into three types: Suspended gongs are more or less flat, circular discs of metal suspended vertically by means of a cord passed through holes near to the top rim. Bossed or nipple gongs have a raised centre boss or knob and are often suspended and played horizontally. Bowl gongs are bowl-shaped and rest on cushions. The latter may be considered a member of the bell category. Gongs are made mainly from bronze or brass, though there are many other alloys in use.

Gongs produce two distinct types of sound. A gong with a substantially flat surface vibrates in multiple modes, giving a "crash" rather than a tuned note. This category of gong is sometimes called a tam-tam, to distinguish it from the bossed gongs that give a tuned note. In Indonesian gamelan ensembles, some bossed gongs are deliberately made to generate an additional beat note in the range from about 1 to 5 Hz. The use of the term "gong" for both these types of instrument is common.

== Types ==
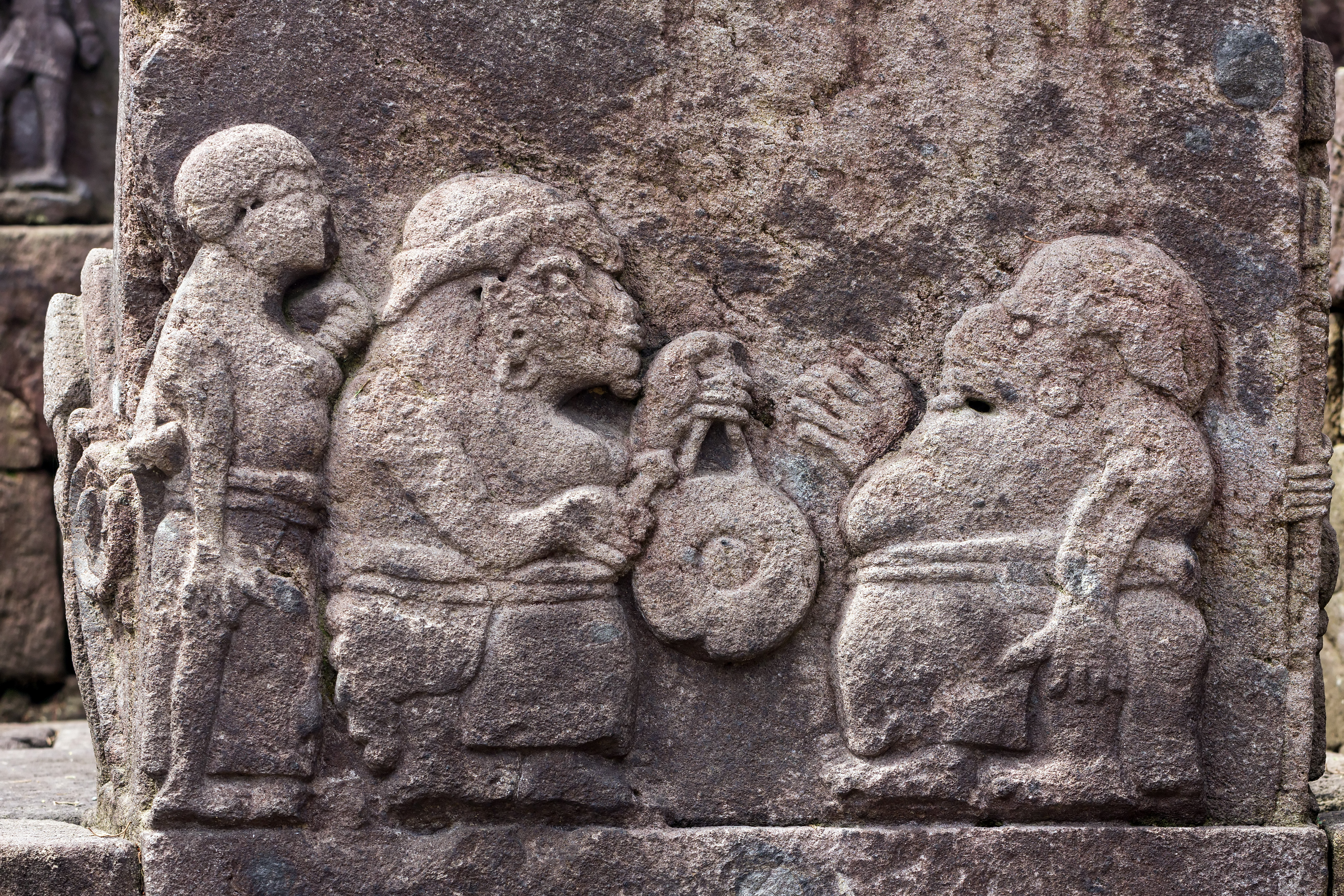
A Gong depicted on the 15th-century temple reliefs at the Candi Sukuh in Central Java, Indonesia

Suspended gongs are played with hammers and are of two main types: flat faced discs, either with or without a turned edge and gongs with a raised centre boss. In general, the larger the gong, the larger and softer the hammer. In Western symphonic music, the flat faced gongs are generally referred to as tam-tams to distinguish them from their bossed counterparts. Here, the term "gong" is reserved for the bossed type only. The gong has been a Chinese instrument for millennia. Its first use may have been to signal peasant workers in from the fields, because some gongs are loud enough to be heard from up to eight kilometres (five miles) away.

Large flat gongs may be 'primed' by lightly hitting them before the main stroke, greatly enhancing the sound and causing the instrument to "speak" sooner, with a shorter delay for the sound to "bloom". Keeping this priming stroke inaudible calls for a great deal of skill. The smallest suspended gongs are played with bamboo sticks or even western-style drumsticks. Contemporary and avant-garde music, where different sounds are sought, will often use friction mallets (producing squeals and harmonics), bass bows (producing long tones and high overtones), and various striking implements (wood/plastic/metal) to produce the desired tones.

Rock gongs are large stones struck with smaller stones to create a metallic resonating sound.

== Traditional suspended gongs ==
=== Chau gong (tam-tam) ===
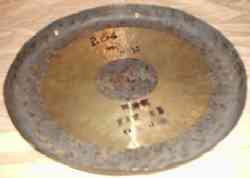
The familiar "Chinese" gong (a 25 cm or 10 in chau gong)

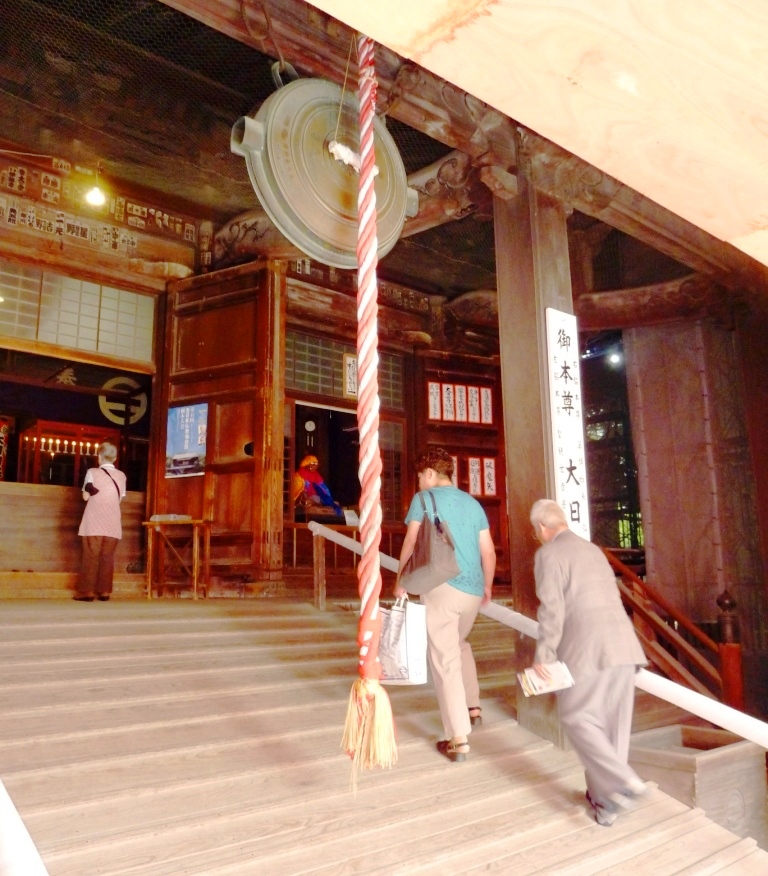
Large gong at Ashikaga Banna-ji

By far the most familiar to most Westerners is the chau gong or bullseye gong. Large chau gongs, called tam-tams have become part of the symphony orchestra. Sometimes a chau gong is referred to as a Chinese gong, but in fact, it is only one of many types of suspended gongs that are associated with China. A chau gong is made of copper-based alloy, bronze, or brass. It is almost flat except for the rim, which is turned up to make a shallow cylinder. On a 25-centimetre (10 in) gong, for example, the rim extends about 1 cm (1/2 in) perpendicular to the surface. The main surface is slightly concave when viewed from the direction to which the rim is turned. The centre spot and rim of a chau gong are left coated on both sides with the black copper oxide that forms during manufacture; the rest is polished to remove this coating. Chau gongs range in size from 20 to 200 cm (7 to 80 in) in diameter.

==== History ====
The earliest Chau gong is from a tomb discovered at the Guixian site in the Guangxi Zhuang Autonomous Region of China. It dates from the early Western Han dynasty. Gongs are depicted in Chinese visual art as of the 6th century CE, and were known for their very intense and spiritual drumming in rituals and tribal meetings. Traditionally, chau gongs were used to clear the way for important officials and processions, much like a police siren today. Sometimes the number of strokes was used to indicate the seniority of the official. In this way, two officials meeting unexpectedly on the road would know before the meeting which of them should bow down before the other.

==== Use in symphony orchestras ====
The tam-tam was first introduced as an orchestral instrument by François-Joseph Gossec in 1790, and it was also taken up by Gaspare Spontini and Jean-François Le Sueur. Hector Berlioz deployed the instrument throughout his compositional career, and in his Treatise on Instrumentation he recommended its use "for scenes of mourning or for the dramatic depiction of extreme horror." Other composers who adopted the tam-tam in the opera house included Gioachino Rossini, Vincenzo Bellini, and Richard Wagner: Rossini in the final of act 3 of Armida (1817), Bellini in Norma (1831) and Wagner in Rienzi (1842). Within a few decades the tam-tam became an important member of the percussion section of a modern symphony orchestra. It figures prominently in the symphonies of Peter Ilyich Tchaikovsky, Gustav Mahler, Dmitri Shostakovich and, to a lesser extent, Sergei Rachmaninov and Sergei Prokofiev. Giacomo Puccini used gongs and tam-tams in his operas. Igor Stravinsky greatly expanded the playing techniques of the tam-tam in The Rite of Spring to include short, quickly damped notes, quick crescendos, and a triangle beater scraped across the front of the instrument. Karlheinz Stockhausen used a 60" Paiste tam-tam in his Momente.

=== Dora ===
A dora is one of the Japanese Percussion instruments and an idiophone. It is made of bronze, brass or iron, and is suspended onto a dora stand. It is widely used in Buddhist memorial services, hayashi performances, kabuki music, and ship departure signals.

=== Nipple gong ===
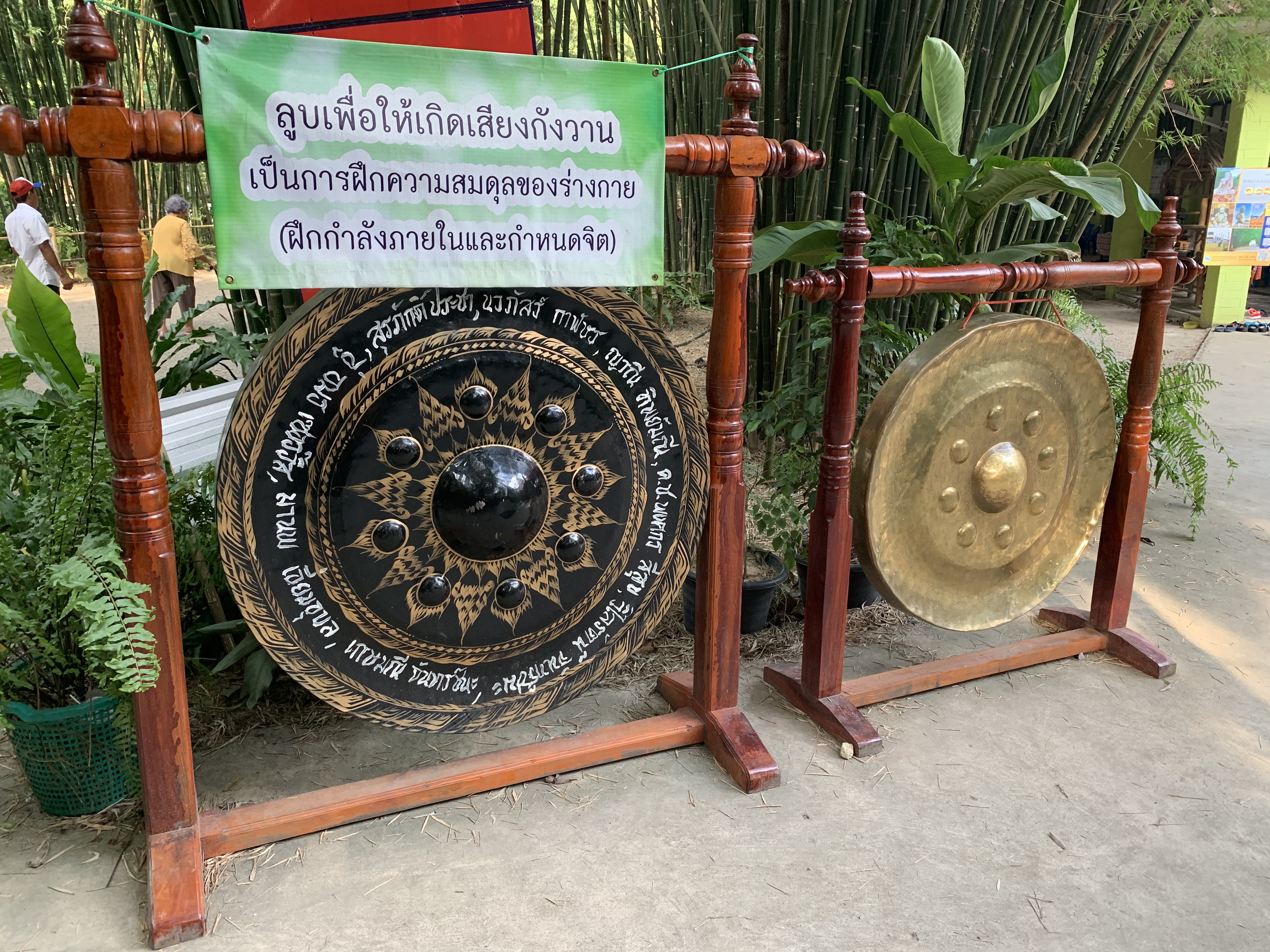
Nipple gongs at Wat Chulaphonwararam, a Wat (Buddhist temple) in Nakhon Nayok

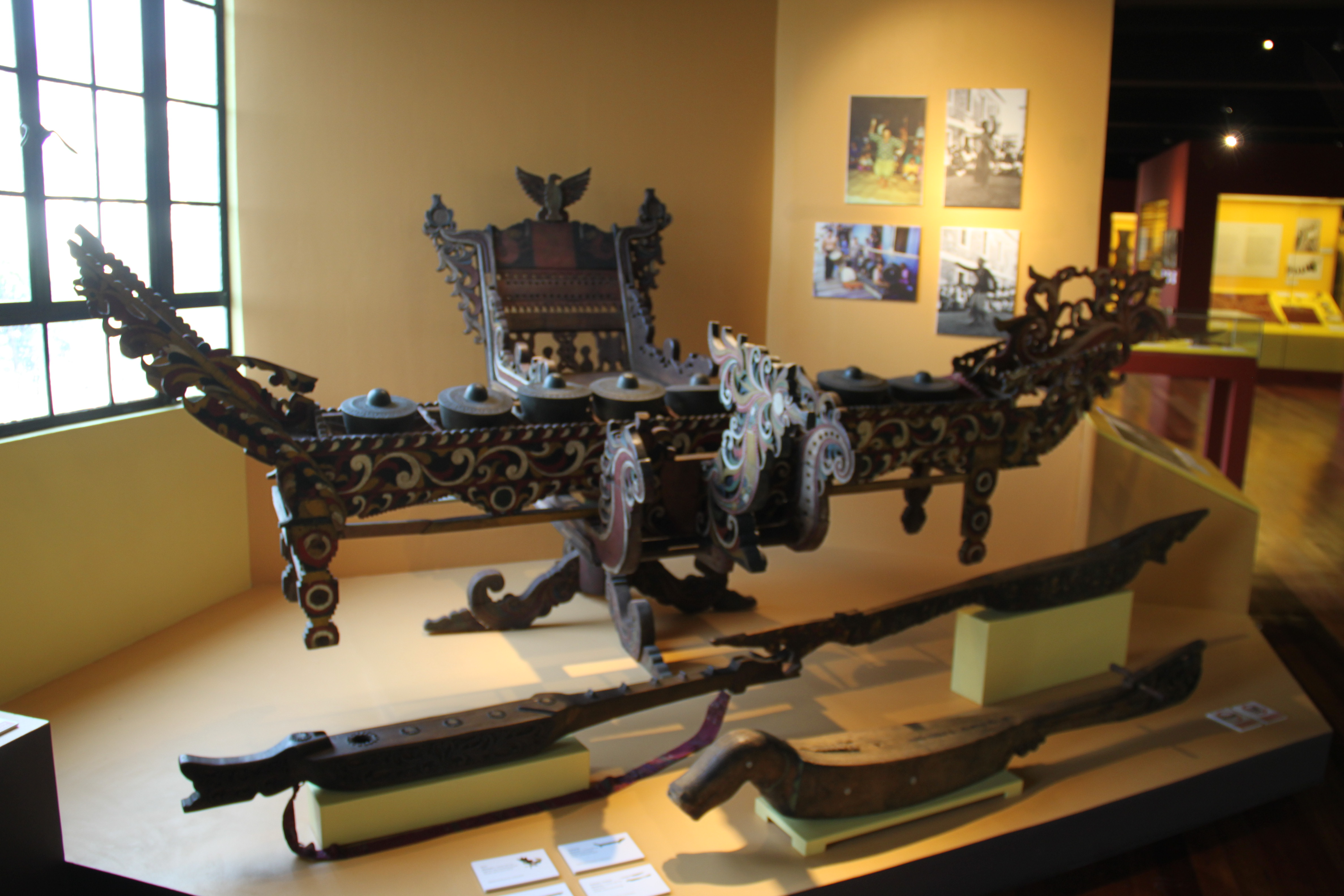
An intricately carved and painted Maranao kulintang ensemble from the National Museum of Anthropology, Philippines, with nipple gongs of various names and pitches

A nipple gong has a central raised boss or nipple, often made of different metals than other gongs with varying degrees of quality and resonance. They have a tone with less shimmer than other gongs, and two distinct sounds depending on whether they are struck on the boss or next to it. They are most often but not always tuned to various pitches.

Nipple gongs range in size from 15 to 50 cm (6 to 20 in) or larger. Sets of smaller, tuned nipple gongs can be used to play a melody.

Nipple gongs are used in Chinese temples for worship and Buddhist temples in Southeast Asia.

These are the primary gong in the traditional Philippine music of kulintang.

In Indonesian gamelan ensembles, instruments that are organologically gongs come in various sizes with different functions and different names. For example, in the central Javanese gamelan, the largest gong is called gong ageng, ranges in size up to 1 meter in diameter, has the deepest pitch and is played least often; the next smaller gong is the gong suwukan or siyem, has a slightly higher pitch and replaces the gong ageng in pieces where gong strokes are close together; the kempul is smaller still, has a higher pitch, and is played more frequently. The gong ageng and some gong suwukan have a beat note.

=== Opera gongs ===
An essential part of the orchestra for Chinese opera is a pair of gongs, the larger with a descending tone, the smaller with a rising tone. The larger gong is used to announce the entrance of major players or men and to identify points of drama and consequence. The smaller gong is used to announce the entry of lesser players or women and to identify points of humour.

Opera gongs range in size from 18 to 30 cm (7 to 12 in), with the larger of a pair 3 or 5 cm (1 or 2 in) larger than the smaller.

=== Pasi gongs ===
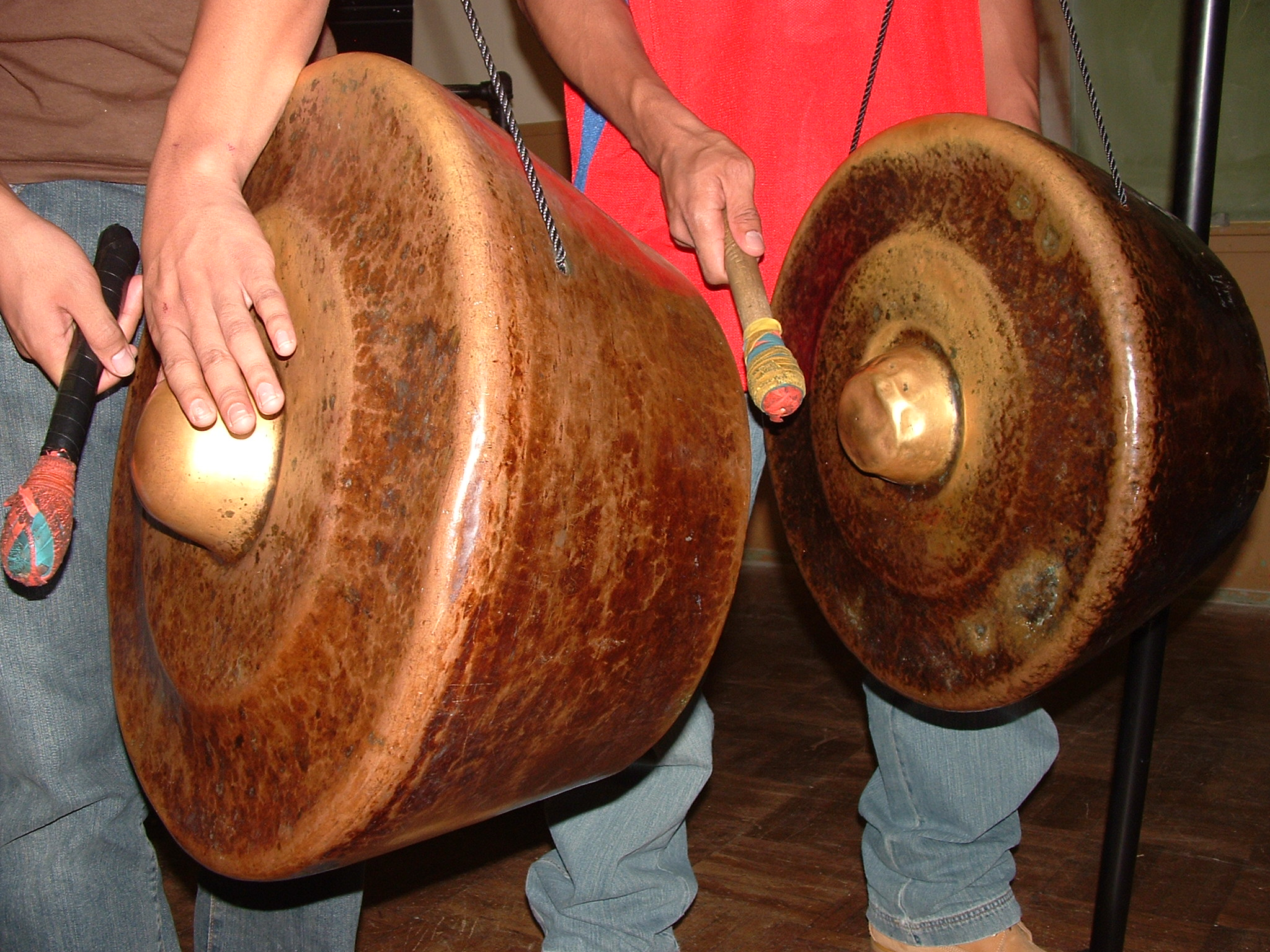
An agung, a type of Philippine hanging gong used as part of the Kulintang ensemble

A Pasi gong is a medium-size gong 30 to 40 cm (12 to 15 in) in size, with a loud crashing sound. It is used traditionally to announce the start of a performance, play or magic. Construction varies, some having nipples and some not, so this type is named more for its function than for its structure or even its sound.

Pasi gongs without nipples have found favour with adventurous middle-of-the-road kit drummers.

=== Tiger gong ===
A tiger gong is a slightly descending or less commonly ascending gong, larger than an opera gong and with a less pronounced pitch shift. Most commonly 38 cm (15 in) but available down to 20 cm (8 in).

=== Shueng Kwong ===
A Shueng Kwong gong is a medium to large gong with a sharp staccato sound.

=== Wind gong ===
Wind gongs (also known as Feng or Lion Gongs) are flat bronze discs, with little fundamental pitch, heavy tuned overtones, and long sustain. They are most commonly made of B20 bronze, but can also be made of M63 brass or NS12 nickel-silver. Traditionally, a wind gong is played with a large soft mallet, which gives it a roaring crash to match their namesake. They are lathed on both sides and are medium to large in size, typically 40 to 55 cm (15 to 22 in) but sizes from 20 to 150 cm (7 to 60 in) are available. The 55 cm (22 in) size is most popular due to its portability and large sound.

They are commonly used by drummers in rock music. Played with a nylon tip drumstick they sound rather like the coil chimes in a mantle clock. Some have holes in the centre, but they are mounted like all suspended gongs by other holes near the rim. The smaller sizes, 18 to 30 cm (7 to 12 in), have a more bell-like tone due to their thickness and small diameter.

=== Sculptural gongs ===
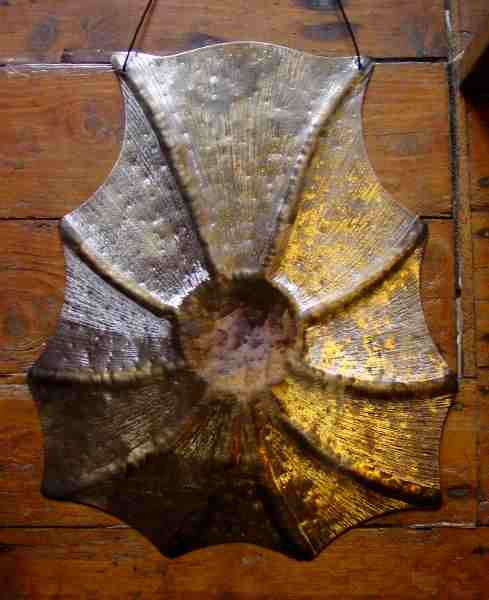
Sculptural gong made by Steve Hubback

Sculptural gongs (also known as Gong Sculptures) are gongs which serve the dual purpose of being a musical instrument and a work of visual art. They are generally not disc shaped, but instead take more complex, even abstract forms. Sculptural gongs were pioneered in the early 1990s by Welsh percussionist and metal crafter, Steve Hubback, who was partially inspired by the work of the French Sound Sculptors, Francois and Bernard Baschet.

Hubback's works have been used by many musicians including solo percussionist Dame Evelyn Glennie and rock drummer Carl Palmer.

English gong and cymbal maker, Matt Nolan, partially inspired by the work of Hubback, also creates sculptural gongs of his own design or to private commission.

UK based sculptor Barry Mason makes gongs in titanium and other elemental metals.

== Other uses ==
In older Javanese usage and in modern Balinese usage, gong is used to identify an ensemble of instruments. In contemporary central Javanese usage, the term gamelan is preferred and the term gong is reserved for the gong ageng, the largest instrument of the type, or for surrogate instruments such as the gong komodong or gong bumbung (blown gong) which fill the same musical function in ensembles lacking the large gong. In Balinese usage, gong refers to Gamelan Gong Kebyar.

== Gong manufacturers ==
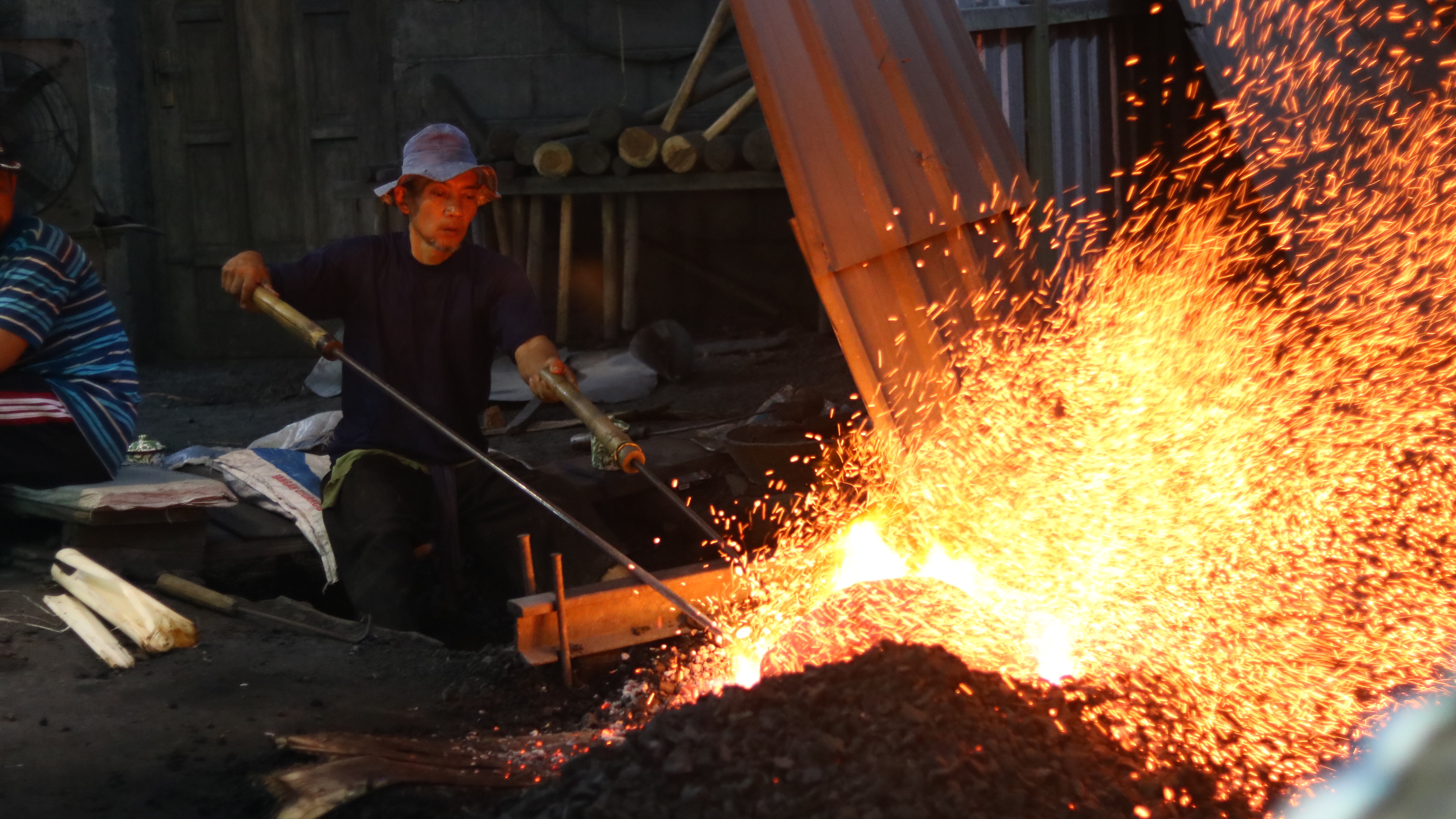
A pande (a gamelan maker) forging a gong in Besalen, Central Java, Indonesia

Besides many traditional and centuries old manufacturers all around China, including Tibet, as well as Burma, Java and Annam gongs have also been made in Europe and America since the 20th century.

Paiste is the largest non-Asian manufacturer of gongs. This Swiss company of Estonian lineage makes gongs at their German factory. Also in Germany, Oetken Gongs, founded in 2011 by Broder Oetken-former Paiste gong master-offers his own range of gongs. He also built the first generation of Symphonic and Planetary gongs for Meinl . Italian company UFIP make a range of gongs at their factory in Pistoia. Michael Paiste, outside of the larger family business, makes gongs independently in Lucerne, Switzerland. Other independent gong manufacturers in Europe include Welshman Steve Hubback, currently based in the Netherlands; Matt Nolan and Michal Milas in the UK; Barry Mason in the UK; and Joao Pais-Filipe in Portugal.

In North America, Sabian make a small number of gongs and Zildjian sell Zildjian-branded gongs which have in the past been made by Zildjian, but current production looks to be Chinese in origin. Ryan Shelledy is an independent gong maker based in the Midwestern United States.

Some of the smaller Turkish cymbal companies have also been seen to dabble in gongs but very much as a sideline to their core business of hand-hammered cymbals.

== Materials and size ==
Gongs vary in diameter from about 50 to 150 cm (20 to 60 in). They are made of a bronze alloy composed of a maximum of 22 parts tin to 78 parts copper, but in many cases the proportion of tin is considerably less. This alloy is excessively brittle when cast and allowed to cool slowly, but it can be tempered and annealed in a peculiar manner to alleviate this. When suddenly cooled from red heat, the alloy becomes so soft that it can be hammered and worked on the lathe then hardened by reheating. Afterwards, the gong has all of the qualities and timbre of the Chinese instruments. The composition of the alloy of bronze used for making gongs is stated to be as follows: 76.52% Cu, 22.43% Sn, 0.26% Pb, 0.23% Zn, 0.81% Fe. In Turkish Cymbal making there is also sulfur and silicon in the alloy.

Turkish Cymbals and Gamelan Gongs share beta phase bronze as a metallurgical roots. Tin and copper mix phase transition graphs show a very narrow up-down triangle at 21–24% tin content and 780 °C (1,440 °F) symbolized by β. This is the secret of all past bronze instrument making. When bronze is mixed and heated, it glows orange-red which indicates it has been heated to the beta phase borders where the metal needs to be submerged in cold water to lock the alloy in the beta phase for cymbal making. The gong is then beaten with a round, hard, leather-covered pad that is fitted on a short stick or handle. It emits a peculiarly sonorous sound which can be varied by particular ways of striking the disk. Its complex vibrations burst into a wave-like succession of tones that can be either shrill or deep. In China and Japan gongs are used in religious ceremonies, state processions, marriages and other festivals.

== Orchestral usage ==
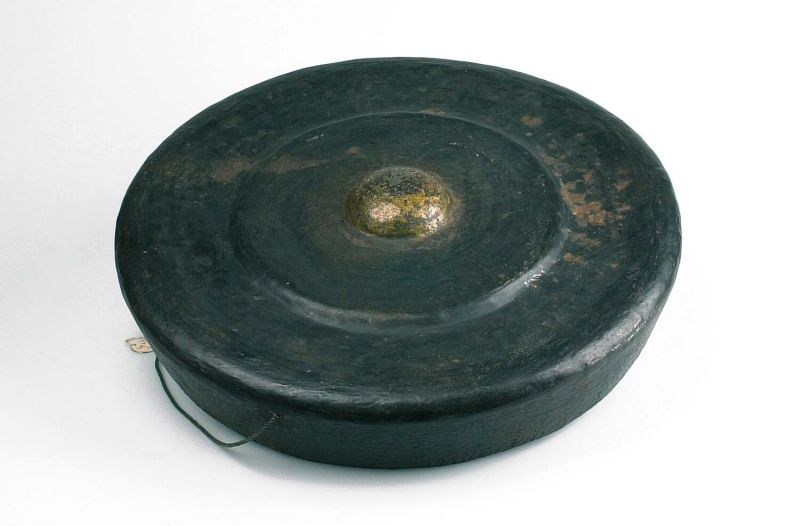
Gong ageng in Javanese Gamelan ensemble

The gong has been used in the orchestra to intensify the impression of fear and horror in melodramatic scenes and usually, but not exclusively, players interpret the term to call for a tam-tam, as noted above. The tam-tam was first introduced into a western orchestra by François-Joseph Gossec in the funeral march composed at the death of Mirabeau in 1791. Gaspare Spontini used the tam-tam in La Vestale's (1807) Act II finale. Berlioz called for four tam-tams in his Grande Messe des morts of 1837. The tam-tam was also used in the funeral music played when the remains of Napoleon were brought back to France in 1840. Meyerbeer made use of the instrument in the scene of the resurrection of the three nuns in Robert le diable. Four tam-tams are used at Bayreuth in Parsifal to reinforce the bell instruments although there is no indication given in the score.

Gustav Mahler, Sergei Rachmaninoff and Dimitri Shostakovich regularly use tam-tams in their symphonies, and Igor Stravinsky uses them in his ballets. In more modern 20th century music, the tam-tam has been used by composers such as Karlheinz Stockhausen in Mikrophonie I (1964–65) and by George Crumb. In Makrokosmos III: Music For A Summer Evening (1974), Crumb expanded the timbral range of the tam-tam by giving performance directions such as using a "well-rosined contrabass bow" to bow the tam-tam. This produced an eerie harmonic sound. Stockhausen created more interesting sounds using hand-held microphones and a wide range of scraping, tapping, rubbing, and beating techniques with unconventional implements such as plastic dishes, egg timers, and cardboard tubes. Gongs can also be immersed into a tub of water after being struck. This is called "water gong" and is called for in several orchestral pieces.

Tuned gongs have also been used with the symphony orchestra, e.g. sets of differently tuned gongs used by Messiaen in pieces such as Des canyons aux étoiles and Et exspecto resurrectionem mortuorum.

== Signal gongs ==
Gongs are also used as signal devices in a number of applications.

=== Boxing (sport) ===
A bowl-shaped, center mounted, electrically controlled gong is standard equipment in a boxing ring. Commonly referred to as the gong, it is struck with a hammer to signal the start and end of each round.

=== Dinner gong ===
During the Victorian and Edwardian eras, it was often the custom in hotels, on ships, and in large, upper-class houses to sound a dinner gong to announce a meal was about to be served.

=== Rail crossing ===
A railroad crossing with a flashing traffic signal or wigwag will also typically have a warning bell. Mechanical bells, known in some places as a gong, are struck by an electric-powered hammer to audibly warn motorists and pedestrians of an oncoming train. Many railroad crossing gongs are now being replaced by electronic devices with no moving parts.

=== Railcar mounted ===
Gongs are present on rail vehicles, such as trams, streetcars, trains, cable cars or light rail trains, in the form of a bowl-shaped signal bell typically mounted on the front of the leading car. It was designed to be sounded to act as a warning in areas where whistles and horns are prohibited, and the "clang of the trolley" refers to this sound. Traditionally, the gong was operated by a foot pedal, but is nowadays controlled by a button mounted on the driving panel. Early trams had a smaller gong with a bell pull mounted by the rear door of these railcars. This was operated by the conductor to notify the driver that it is safe to proceed.

=== Shipping ===
A vessel over 100 metres (330 feet) in length must carry a gong in addition to a bell and whistle, the volume of which is defined in the International Regulations for Preventing Collisions at Sea. A vessel at anchor or aground sounds the gong in the stern immediately after ringing a bell in her bows so as to indicate her length.

=== Theater ===
Electromechanical, electromagnetic or electronic devices producing the sound of gongs have been installed in theatres (particularly those in the Czech Republic) to gather the audience from the lounge to the auditorium before the show begins or proceeds after interlude.

=== Time signal ===
German radio stations use a gong sound for the time signal.

=== Vehicle mounted ===
In the Commonwealth, emergency vehicles were fitted with electric, manual, or vacuum operated Winkworth bell gongs in the time before Martin's horns became available or rotary sirens came into use

== List of gongs ==
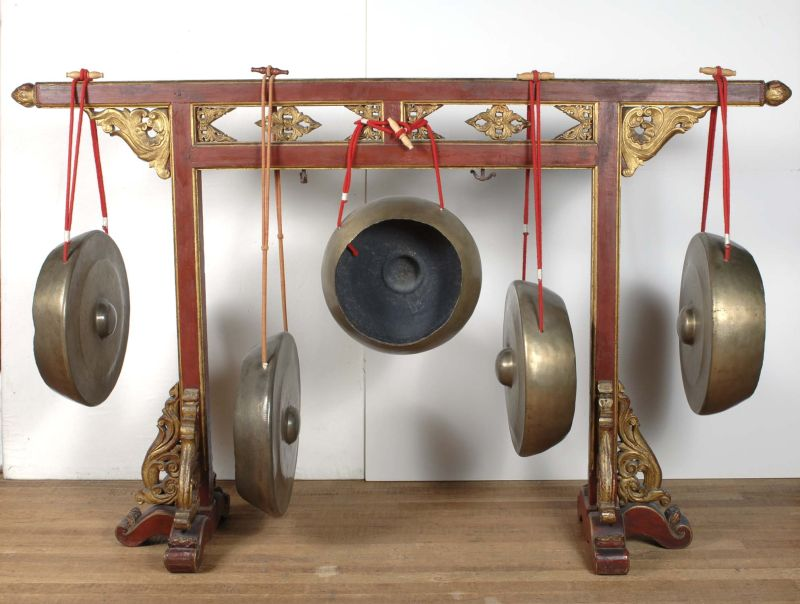
Indonesian Kempul gong.

- Agung
- Babendil
- Bonang
- Darkhuang
- Gandingan
- Gong ageng
- Gungsa
- Kempul
- Kempyang and ketuk
- Kenong
- Khong mon
- Kulintang
- Chau gong
- Rin gong
- Umpan
- Tagonggo
- Bor Kaah used in Assam and other parts of the NE India region

== See also ==
- Gong chime
- Space of gong culture in the Central Highlands of Vietnam
- Bronze drum
- Music of Indonesia
- Music of Java
- Music of Bali
