= Istanbul cymbals =

Two brands of cymbals made in Istanbul

Istanbul is the name of two brands of cymbals, Istanbul Agop and Istanbul Mehmet, made in Istanbul using traditional cymbal making methods.

== See also ==
- Cymbal manufacturers
