= Umpan =

Flat metal gong used in Zen monasteries

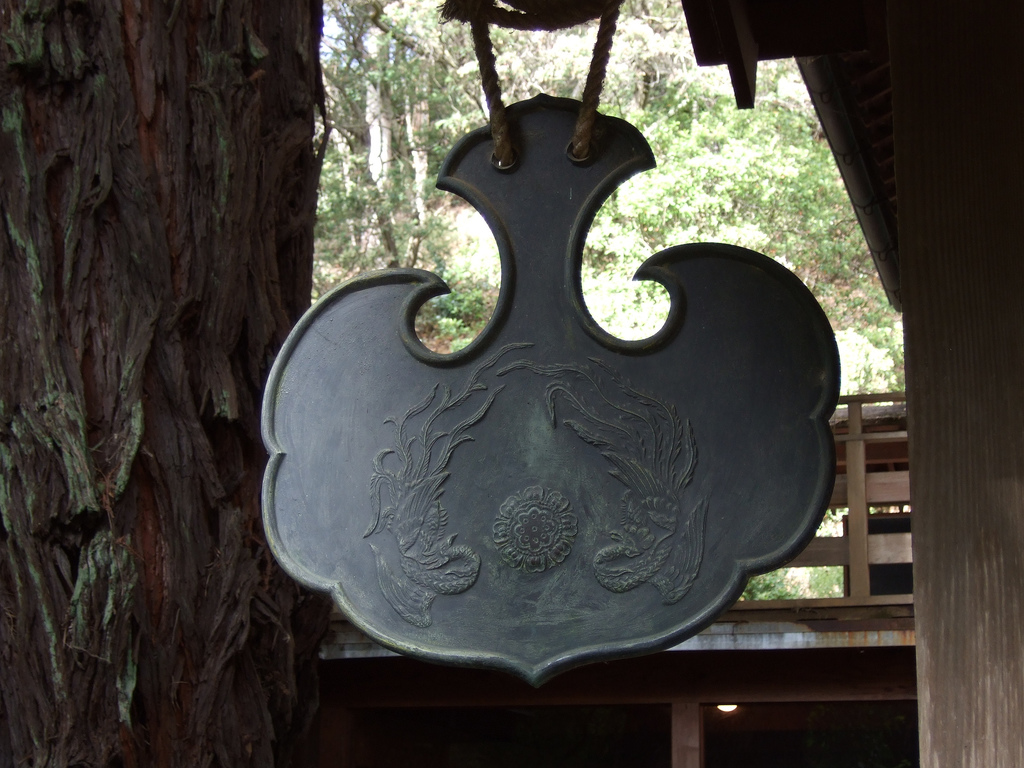
An umpan at Green Gulch Farm Zen Center

An umpan (umpan (雲版), Chinese: 雲版; pinyin: yún bǎn, literally "cloud plate") is a flat gong, usually bronze, which is rung at mealtime in a Zen monastery. Literally translated as "cloud plate," the umpan is also sounded to "signal other events," such as a call to the conclusion of zazen. Typically one will find an umpan outside the kitchen (J. kuri) or dining hall area. According to Helen J. Baroni, "Wooden boards (han) hanging on various buildings throughout the temple grounds are sounded simultaneously to alert the members of the community beyond the range of the umpan."

== See also ==
- Buddhism in Japan
- Gong
