= Hammerax =

- Type: Private
- Industry: Musical instruments
- Founded: 2006; 20 years ago
- Founder: John Stannard
- Headquarters: Clearwater, Florida, United States
- Products: Cymbals
- Website: hammerax.com

Hammerax was an American percussion and cymbal manufacturer, launched in 2006 by audio engineer John Stannard. Hammerax is known for their unique percussive creations and unusual instrument designs, which have received mixed reviews from customers.

Notable users of their cymbals include Terry Bozzio and Danny Carey.

== Products ==
Its cymbals, which have been crafted in many unique and patented or patent pending forms, are particularly noted. Hammerax's private collection includes at least 50 instruments, some of which were experimental test prototypes.

== See also ==
- Cymbals
