= Agean Cymbals =

Turkish cymbal manufacturer

Agean
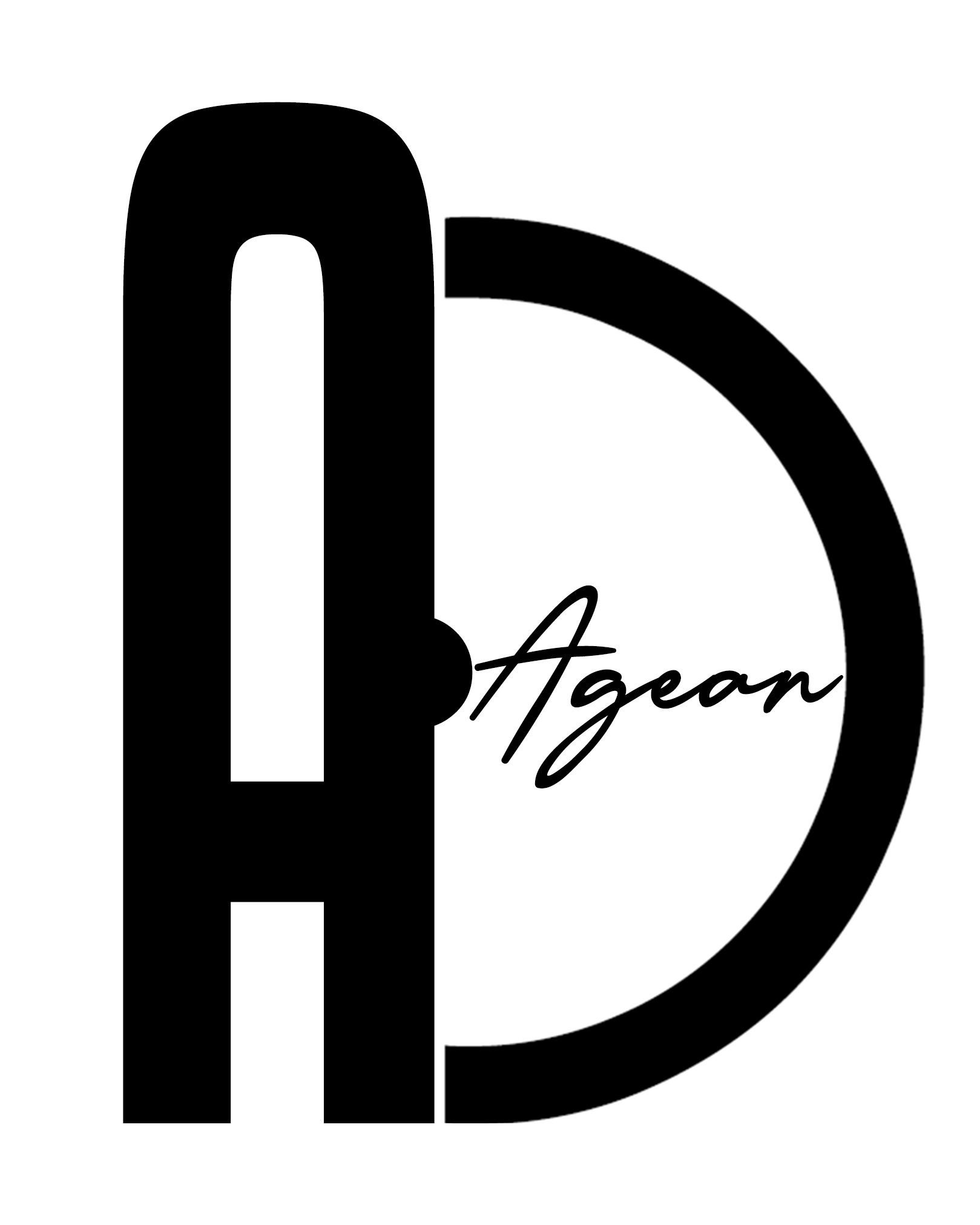
- Company type: Private
- Industry: Musical Instruments
- Founded: 2002
- Headquarters: Istanbul
- Number of locations: 2
- Area served: Europe; US; Japan; Brazil; Colombia; Russia
- Key people: Halil Kırmızıgül; Samet Kırmızıgül
- Products: Cymbals; Percussion Instruments
- Parent: Kırmızıgül Music Company
- Website: www.ageancymbals.com

Agean Cymbals is a manufacturer of cymbals and other percussion instruments of the Western classical, folk, and Turkish traditions. Their factory is located in Edirne, while their main office is situated in Istanbul.

== History ==
Agean Cymbals was founded in 2002 by Behnan Gocmez. In 2007, the brand was bought by the Kırmızıgül family, who were already manufacturing traditional Turkish and other ethnic percussion instruments—including darbukas, doumbeks, and bongos—under the Kırmızıgül Company.

Until late 2007, the Agean Cymbals factory was located in Istanbul, but the company decided to move production operations to Uzunköprü, Edirne, since the traditional cymbal manufacturing process was becoming difficult to maintain in the city center.

Agean cymbals have presented their products at Musikmesse Frankfurt in 2007-2009 and 2017-2018. They were also set to present in 2020, but the event was cancelled due to the COVID-19 pandemic. In 2017, they presented a new kind of low-volume cymbal—a type often used for practice or in smaller venues where louder cymbals are impractical—using traditional B20 bronze alloy—the first company to use the material for low-volume cymbals.

In 2019, they expanded operations to produce other kinds of percussion instruments in addition to their line of cymbals.

== See also ==
- List of cymbal manufacturers
- Cymbal making
