= Kuri (kitchen) =

Type of Zen monastery building

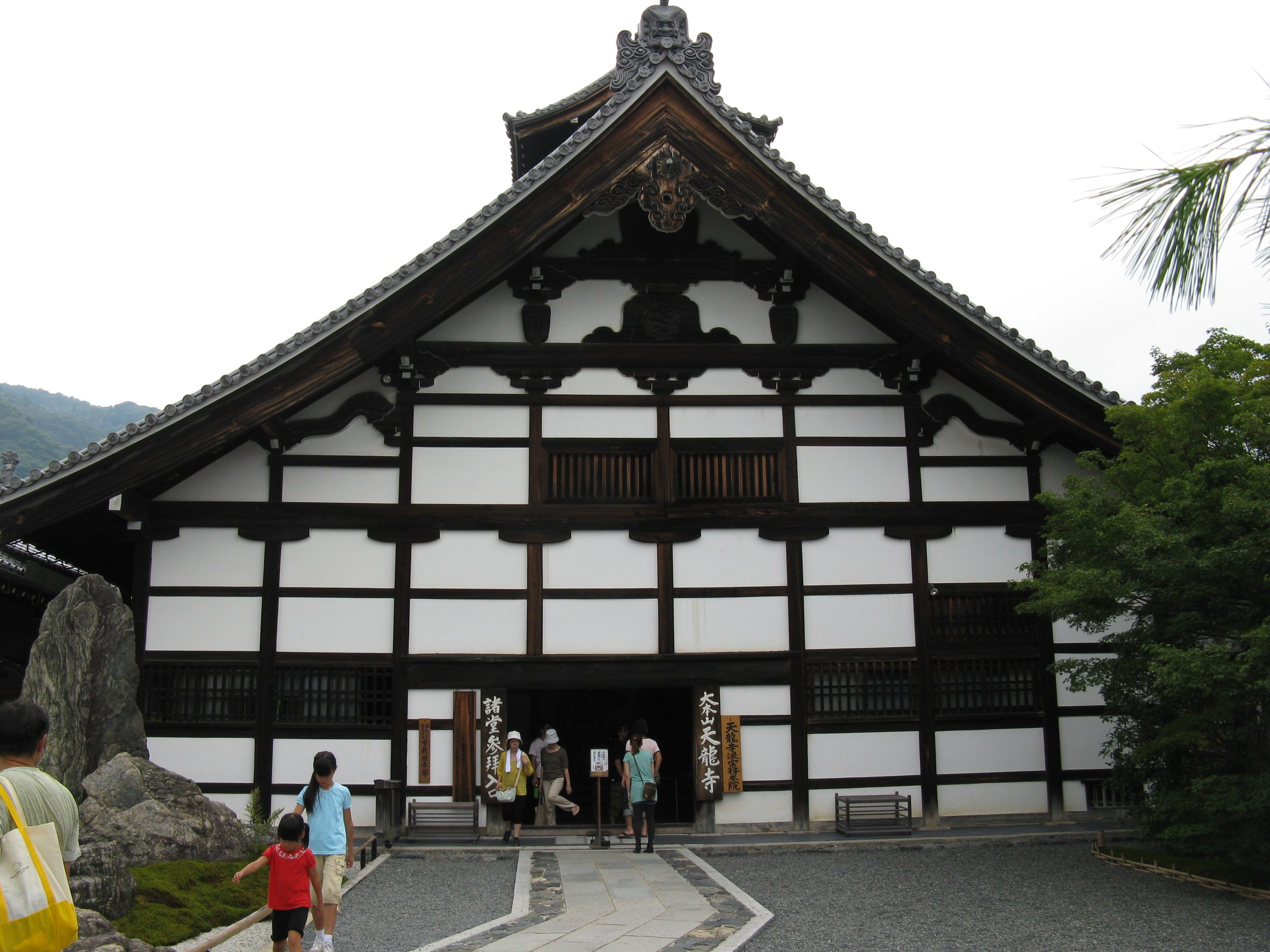
Kuri at Tenryū-ji.

A kuri (庫裏, lit. warehouse behind) or kuin (庫院, lit. warehouse hall) is the kitchen of a Zen monastery, typically located behind the butsuden (or, Buddha Hall). Historically the kuri was a kitchen which prepared meals only for the abbot and his guests, though in modern Japan it functions as the kitchen and administrative office for the entire monastery.

== See also ==
- Kaisando
- Umpan
