= Kimaera =

Lebanese metal band

- Origin: Beirut, Lebanon
- Genres: Death-doomatmospheric metal; progressive metal; oriental metal
- Years active: 2000 - present
- Labels: Eternal Sound Records; Stygian Crypt Productions
- Members: Charbel Abboud; Pierre Najm; Georges Antabi; Joe Nassar; Michel Kammouj
- Website: www.kimaera.info

Kimaera is a Lebanese death metal band founded by vocalist and guitarist Jean-Pierre Haddad in 2000. The band's music combines oriental metal, doom metal and death metal influences, with gothic undertones resounding through melodic interludes of violins, pianos and occasional female vocals.

== History ==
In March 2004, the band released God's Wrath, a self-produced single. The release got the attention of Stygian Crypt Productions, which in turn led to the band's release of their debut album Ebony Veiled. The album was released in February 2006 in Lebanon and on 20 April 2006 the album saw a worldwide release.

Kimaera is among the first wave of international metal bands originating from the Middle East, known in their homeland as the "Lebanese Ambassadors of Doom".

The band released its second full-length album Solitary Impact with Stygian Crypt Productions in July 2010, along with their first official music video "The Taste of Treason". In 2013, Kimaera released their third album The Harbinger of Doom after inking a deal with the German label Eternal Sound Records.

In February 2022, Kimaera's lead singer, Jean Pierre Haddad, was found dead in his apartment in Egypt after a natural gas leak.

== Members ==
- Charbel Abboud - Rhythm Guitars / keyboards / producer
- Pierre Najm - Lead Guitars
- Georges Antabi - Vocals
- Joe Nassar - Drums
- Michel Kammouj - Bass Guitar
- Jean-Pierre Haddad - guitars & vocals (deceased)

== Discography ==
=== Studio albums ===
- Ebony Veiled (2006)
- Solitary Impact (2010)
- The Harbinger of Doom (2013)
- Imperivm (2022)

=== Singles ===
- "December Ends" (2011)
- "The Die Is Cast" (2017)
- "Leich La'" (2019)
- "Force Divine | Vi Divina" (2020)
- "Ya Beirut" (2020)
