= Zanchi (cymbals) =

Italian cymbal manufacturer

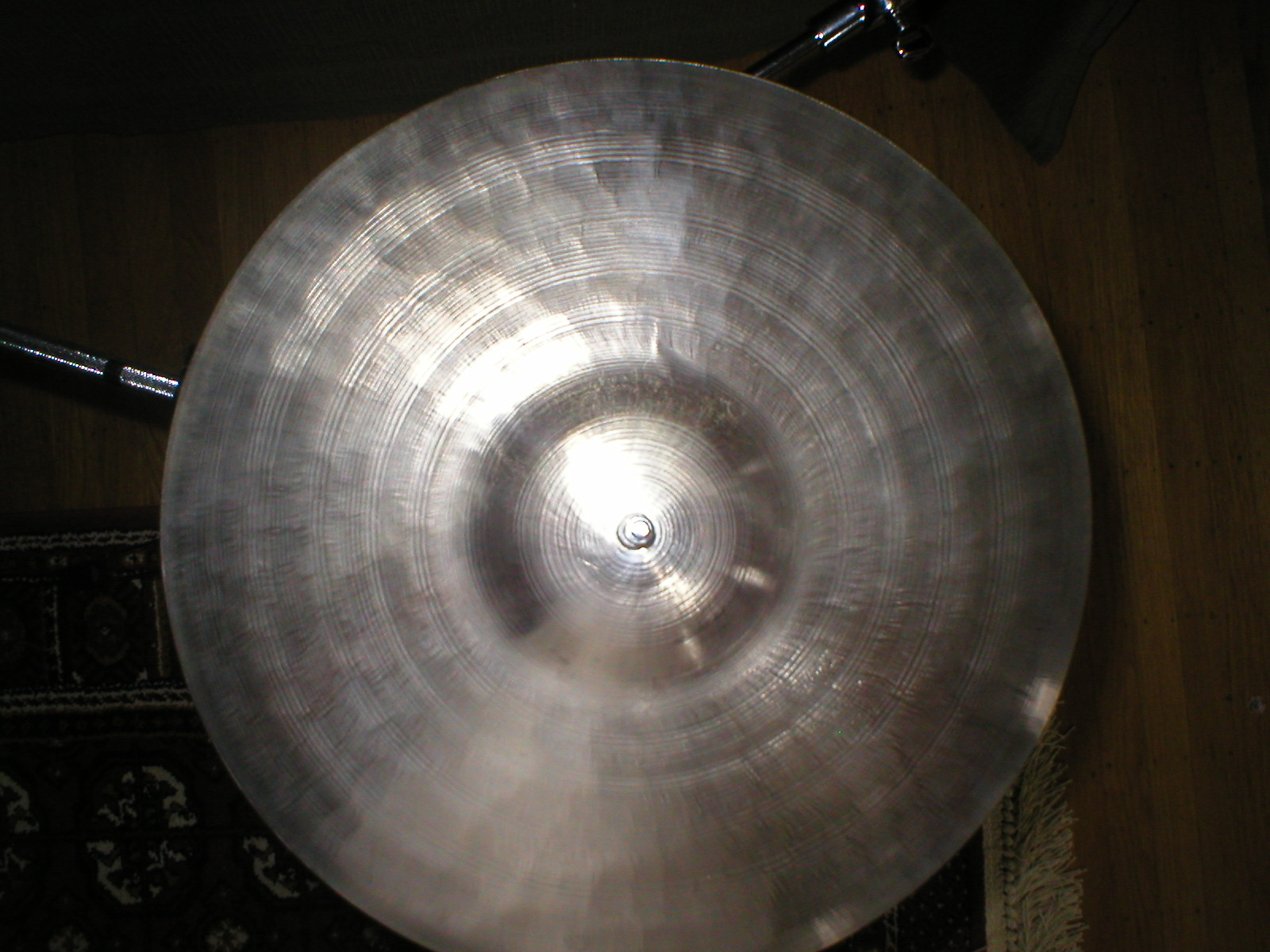
Zanchi brand cymbal

Zanchi (later spelled Zanki) is an Italian brand of cymbals. The brand was made between 1947 till around the mid 1990s, and was noted for its 'Vibra' cymbals.

== History ==
Italian cymbal-maker, Fiorello Zanchi, reputedly started out working for the Tronci family of cymbal/pipe organ makers in the 1920s, according to Pinksterboer. Per the same source, it is said that Fiorello started his own workshop, Zanchi, in 1947, and began producing handmade, hand-hammered cymbals. However, to date none of these pre-50s Zanchis have shown themselves on the market (see below). Zanchi cymbals were marketed primarily in Europe. Fiorello and Figli (Fiorello Zanchi and Sons) were responsible for all Zanchi cymbals. They changed the spelling to Zanki to prevent foreigners from mispronouncing the name. Carlo Biasei (UFIP) depicts Fiorello Zanchi as the teacher of all Pistoian cymbal makers: "He was the man with the golden hands". In the company's heyday, the early 1950s there were around fourteen people working at the factory. In the 1970s the demand for Zanchi cymbals became so great (mostly in the U.S.A. distributed by Unicorn), the company couldn't deliver sufficiently, which led to their closing in 1992.

Some of their earlier series included the "Vibra Cymbals" line; for a number of years, Vibras were believed to have been produced in the 60s or 70s. Recent information provided by an owner of some hi-hats in Connecticut confirms that his were purchased in 1958, so this is the oldest attribution anyone has contributed thus far. A few F & F Vibra cymbals have appeared on the market which also show the "Revere" embossment: interesting because Revere was an early stencil brand of Pearl, Japan in the 60s, so one may presume that, for some period of time, Zanchi had a business relationship with Pearl, However, Revere was also a stencil brand of Kent drums which were American made and sold. Later Kent did sublet some of their manufacturing to Pearl. But the Revere Spotlight cymbals were made by Zanchi for Revere made by Kent drum Company. Vibras were B20 Alloy, usually thin, and are described by some as trashy sounding. Yet, their sizzle and iciness are considered by some musicians to be unique, even by today's standards.

== Change of Name ==
In the 70s, the company name was changed to Zanki, perhaps because the Italian "ch" is pronounced as a "k"; or, perhaps, simply as a marketing device. During the 70s, Zankis usually had large ink logos with the 'Zanki' name. Sometimes the character font was hollow, sometimes bold. The embossed stamp was changed to read "ZANKI Italy". These cymbals were still handmade, but were heavier, and more conventional-sounding, and are considered by some to be comparable to a late 60s or early 70s Avedis Zildjian cymbal. Zanki occasionally still used the name Vibra on some of their 70s series cymbals, but they do not resemble the F & F Vibras from earlier, in either hammering or lathing.

== Manufacturing ==
Perhaps Fiorello Zanchi's biggest contribution to cymbal-making history was his development of the "rotocasting" technique, in which molten bronze is poured into a cymbal cast that is mounted on a centrifuge, and rotated as the liquefied metal is being cooled inside the cast. This new technique created a brand new sound in Italian cymbals, much brighter than the previous Zankis. It is reputed that Fiorello used the larger workshop at UFIP to do his rotocasting. These rotocast cymbals bore a new embossed stamp, "Zanki Rotocasting". Some of these cymbals also show an additional embossment that reads: "Music Industries". Still others show an ink stamp by the Italian distributor "Mario Corso". It would appear from the varying stamps of this period that Zanki was associating with different distributors in an attempt to keep the cymbals on the market.

== Closure and influence ==
According to Pinksterboer, Fiorello Zanchi died in the 80s and his sons, Mariano and Roni, continued the company. Ultimately, however, at some point in the late 80s or early 90s, F & F Zanki (like other small, independent cymbal/gong-making families in Italy at the time, including Tronci and Tuscano) could no longer compete with the larger cymbal-makers. Amid concern that the Italian tradition of cymbal-making was at risk of becoming extinct, a number of the smaller operations joined under the banner of the largest/oldest Italian union/workshop, UFIP, and ceased independent production. Thus, Fiorello and Sons brought to UFIP the technique of rotocasting, which is a UFIP trademark today.

As F & F Zanki was more or less targeting the mid-price range of the market, some of its cymbals are considered to be mediocre at best, while others ranged from "exceptional" to "not too good at all". The varying quality of these remaining cymbals may well be why they remain relatively obscure. However, Zankis are significant in cymbal-making history and Fiorello Zanchi deserves his place on the list of notable cymbal artisans.

Their signature stamp reads: "F & F Zanchi, Made in Italy". "F & F" stands for "Fiorello e Figli" (Fiorello and Sons).
