= Darkhuang =

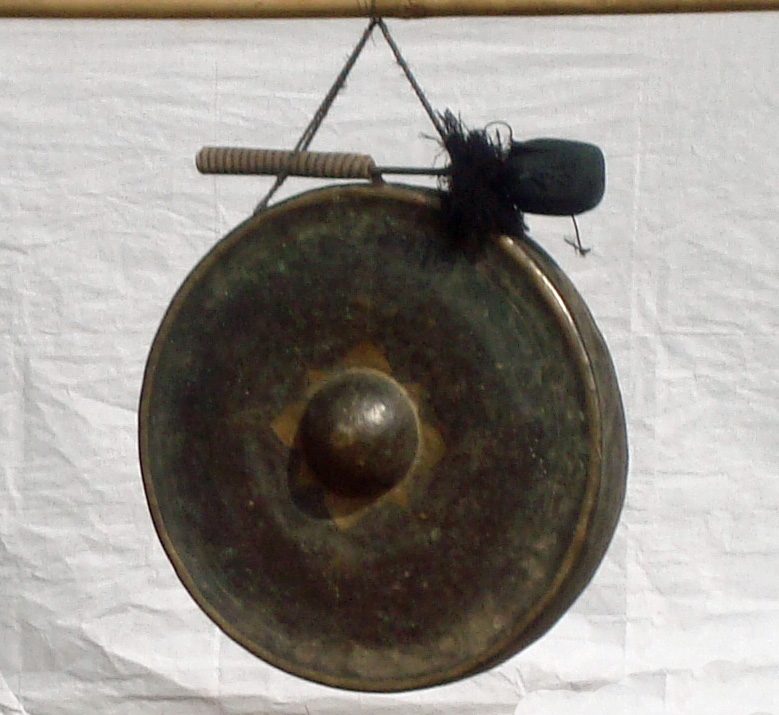
Darkhuang, musical drum made of brass

Darkhuang, also known as Zamluang (Jamluang), is a large brass musical drum used as part of cultural activities of dance and festival revelry in the State of Mizoram in the northeastern part of India. It is a costly drum. Beating of this dar or drum or gong is known in the local Mizo language as "Darkhuang-Tum" and the central knob or boss is known as "Darkhuang-Tum Pawn". In ancient days it was an important musical instrument used to convey or exchange messages. It is also used to convey messages of mourning to distant areas and is therefore known as Zamluang. Since the last several decades it is used in the legislative assembly hall of the Government of Mizoram to take quorum calls of the assembly at its every morning and evening sessions. This gong's cultural usage is also said to be as a dowry gift demanded by the bride's parents, which is attested by the following verse.

Chawngvungi her price so high
I gave necklace hut they refused,
I gave a gong and they refused
They demanded our sacred gong,
Chawngvungi, her price unsurpassed"

== Types ==
The Darkhuang gongs were originally imported from Myanmar (earlier known as Burma) in sets of three gongs with varying modulations giving sounds of emotion. However, Mizos have developed local types which are made in two sizes; the larger gong is known as Darkhuang while the smaller gong is called as Darmang; The collective name of the gongs is dar. These instruments are commonly used during festivals, known as Khuangchawi or Thangchhua, where the Khuallam dance (a mixed-gender dance) is performed.

A large Darkhuang gong measures 3.41 spans in circumference with a diameter of one span (unit conversion 1 span = 9 inches), and has a circular projection at the center which is struck to make the sound. As the drum is considered precious by the people of Mizoram it is normally kept in a basket and is taken out only on special occasions for use.
