= Matt Nolan =

English musical instrument maker

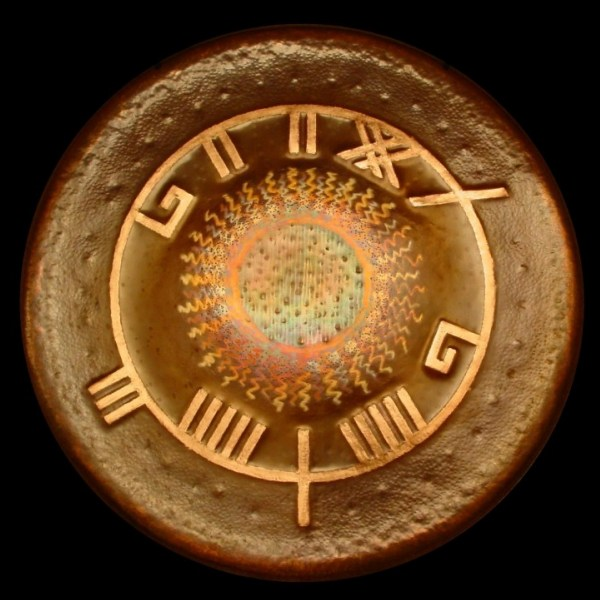
A 28 inch diameter gong in bronze made by Matt Nolan for the American percussionist William Winant. The characters are in the ancient Irish writing system Ogham. The text is read from top in the clockwise direction: ᚛ᚗᚂᚂᚘᚋ ᚗᚅᚐᚅᚈ᚜. Transcription: UILLIAM UINANT (William Winant).

Matt Nolan (born 1974) is an English drummer, bespoke musical instrument maker and metal sculptor. Nolan works as an independent cymbal and gong maker from his workshop in Bath in the South-West of England. Nolan is part of a small community of one-man "artisan cymbalsmiths" and attracts the interest of professional drummers and musicians. Nolan was an electrical engineer before he became an instrument maker. According to The Drummer's Journal, Nolan is "the only person in the UK independently making cymbals, alongside only a handful of other individuals worldwide."

Nolan crafts by hand different metal percussion musical instruments, both repeated lines and bespoke commissions, including novel instruments and recreations of period instruments. Nolan started experimenting with making metal percussion instruments in 2005. In 2008, he started a one-man artisan business. Nolan works with a range of materials, including bronze alloys, stainless steel and titanium.

Nolan has consulted and worked collaboratively on various projects, including the Stella Artois's Chalice Symphony, the Gameleste for Björk (an experimental musical instrument used on the Biophilia album and tour and also displayed at the Museum of Modern Art in New York City), and underwater instruments for Danish group, Aquasonic.

Nolan won the 2025 Creative Bath "Product Design and Creation" Award primarily for his work in 2024 with artist Lawrence Abu Hamdan. Nolan designed and built a series of water-powered kinetic sound sculptures for Abu Hamdan's "Wsh wsh" exhibit at the inaugural Public Art Abu Dhabi Biennial festival.
