= Loh tarang =

Melodic percussion instrument

The Loh Tarang is a melodic percussion instrument. It consists of a set of iron circular plates, of different sizes, held in a frame. Each plate is pitched to a note and they are struck with sticks on each hand. 'Tarang' literally means waves. Plates sound depends on the different size of plate and hand movement. Theory is based like Jal-Tarang.

Melodious sounds of Indian folk instruments like the Loh Tarang touch hearts. The celestial ambiance folk instruments create is an experience to be experienced. Natural materials are used to make these instruments. The sounds closest to nature come from folk instruments. Some of the instruments mentioned in this list are also used in other countries. In India, folk instruments are popularly used in spiritual and devotional songs. These instruments are also used in traditional dance forms, village ceremonies and street theater.

A number of ethnic groups as like "swardhara the music"in India use folk instruments. Loh Tarang and other Indian instruments are not easily available in musical instrument stores. That’s because they are not used commonly in popular forms of music.abhishek jadham design this instrument and teach also Ethnic instruments used in folk tradition are hard to come by. Folk instruments from India have been used by musicians in world music and ethnic fusion. Although Indian classical music is regarded as a higher art form than Indian folk music, there is no denying that classical ragas have been influenced by various forms of folk music. Instruments used in Indian folk music stir the soul. Dwell in the mystical sounds of India.

== Instruments used in Indian Folk Music ==
• Udukai (Percussion Instrument)
• Algoza (Woodwind Instrument)
• Sarinda (Bowed String Instrument)
• Sruti upanga (Bagpipe)
• Ghungroo (Musical Anklet)
• Khol (Indian Drum)
• Chengila (Percussion Instrument)
• Pepa (Flute-like Instrument)
• Idakka (Hourglass-Shaped Drum)
• Tamak’(Double-Headed Drum)
• Pambai (Cylindrical Drum Pair)
• Duggi (Drum)
• Elathalam (Miniature Cymbal-like Percussion Instrument)
• Loh Tarang (Percussion Instrument)
• Khartal (Percussion Instrument) • Urumee (Hourglass-Shaped Drum)
• Patayani thappu (Indian Frame Drum)
• Dholak (Double-Headed Hand Drum)
• Thappu (Circular Wood-Frame Drum)
• Pungi (Wind Instrument)
• Madhalam (Wooden Drum)
• Thavil (Barrel-Shaped Drum)
• Titti (Bagpipe)
• Mizhavu (Percussion Instrument)
• Panchamukha vadyam (Metal Drum)
• Gubguba (Percussion String Instrument)
• Maddale (Percussion Instrument)
• Damru (Two-Headed Drum)
• Ghumot (Percussion Instrument)
• Kuzhal (Double Reed Wind Instrument)
• Dhad (Hourglass-Shaped Drum)
• Mashak (Bagpipe)
• Dhol (Double-Headed Drum)
• Gogona (Jaw Harp-Vibrating Reed Instrument)
• Dollu (Big Drum)
• Chenda (Percussion Instrument)
• Dotara (Stringed Instrument)

== Percussion Education ==
Percussion instruments are divided into two classifications: definite (tuned) pitch and indefinite (untuned) pitch. They are instruments that are banged, shaken, or taped. The old bass drum is an example of an unpitched percussion instrument. The xylophone is an example of a pitched percussion instrument.

The first percussion instrument was the stone and stick. Musical stones dates back to 2300 B.C. Notched sticks, rattles, and hollowed log drums were also created during this time. The percussion family includes ancient hourglassed-shaped talking drums, modern metal oil drums, chains jerked in and out of boxes, half coconut shells banged together, washboards, cowbells, wind-bells, thunder sheets, and even brake drums. Just about anything can be turned into a percussion instrument. Today, garbage cans and their lids are being used as percussion instruments.

Tuned percussion instruments consists of the Timpani, Xylophone, Marimba, Glockenspiel, and the Cimbalom. Untuned percussion instruments consists of the Drum (various types), Cymbals, Triangle, Tambourine, Castanets, Chinese Wood Block, and the Tam-Tam. Each individual instrument brings in a certain quality and tone to music. It enhances the total sound of the music and they play a crucial part in music composition and arrangement.

== See also ==
- Jal tarang
