= UFIP =

Italian musical instrument manufacturing company

UFIP S.r.l.
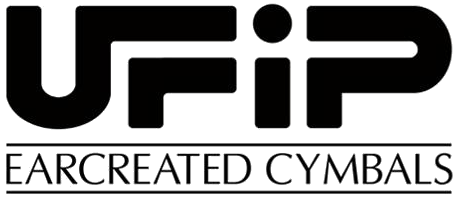
- Company type: SRL
- Industry: Musical instruments
- Founded: 1931; 95 years ago
- Headquarters: Pistoia, Italy
- Key people: Luigi Tronci (President), Alberto Biasei (CEO)
- Products: Cymbals, gongs, and metal percussion
- Website: ufip.it

UFIP, an acronym for Unione Fabbricanti Italiani Piatti (Italian Cymbal Manufacturers Union) is an Italian musical instrument manufacturing company based in Pistoia, Tuscany.

The company currently produces cymbals, gongs, and metal percussion instruments.

== History ==
In the early 20th century the "Agati-Tronci" company, a known pipe organ manufacturer, began the production of cymbals, as they were difficult to import from Turkey. In 1926 a worker for the Tronci family, Fiorello Zanchi, left the company to start a new cymbal manufacturer with Manlio Biasei, the "Zanchi & Biasei" company. A number of cymbals manufacturers were founded in Pistoia after the First World War, starting a competition.

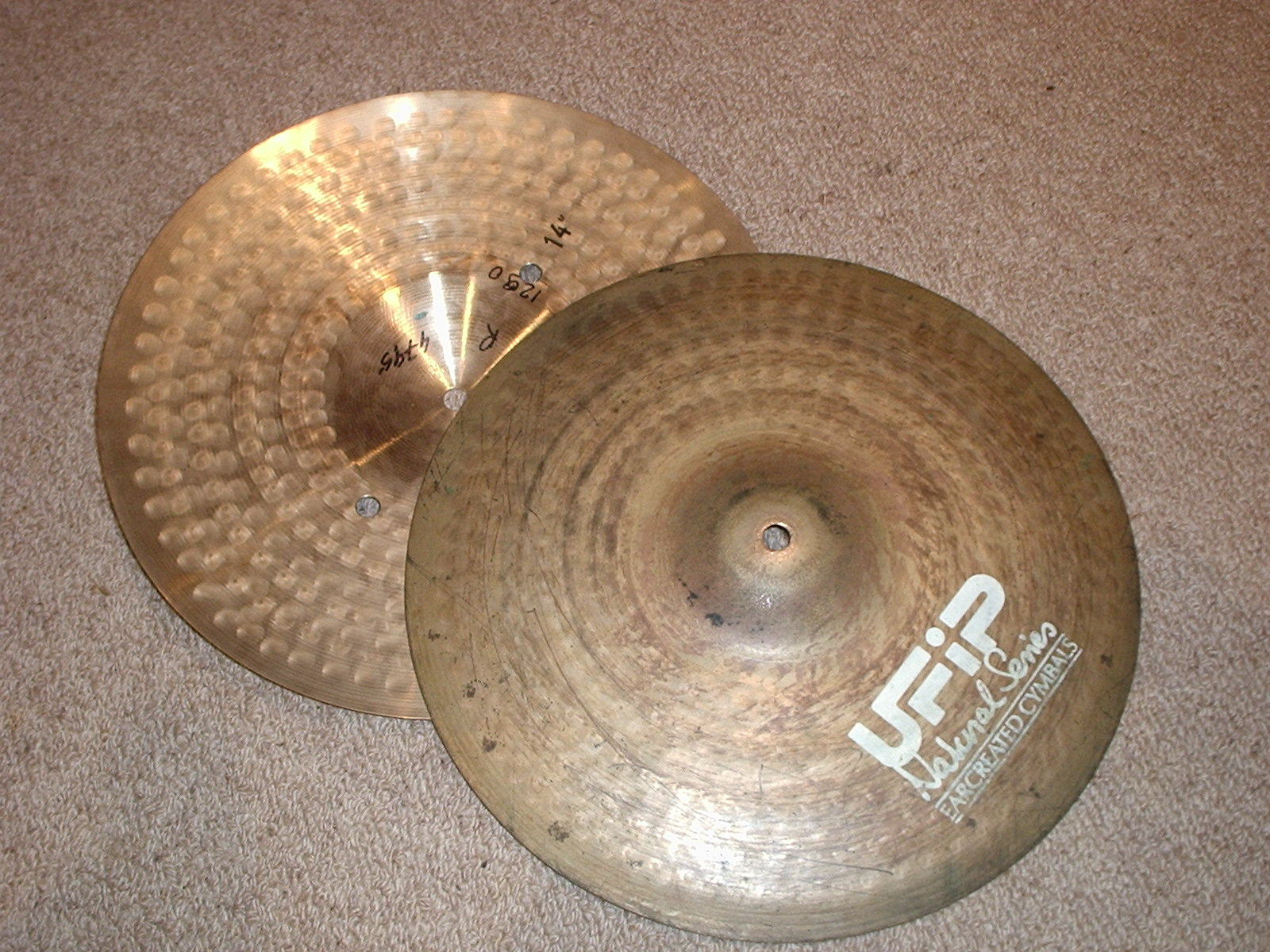
UFIP Natural Series 14" hi-hats

On January 6, 1931 four companies (Marradi-Benti, Zanchi & Biasei, Rosati Leopoldo and A. & B. Fratelli Tronci) founded a cooperative society called UFIP to stop the competition between cymbals manufacturers. In 1947 Zanchi left UFIP to start his own company, Zanchi (later spelled "Zanki"). In 1968 UFIP changed from a cooperative society to an actual production company.

The grandson of Rosati, Buiani, co-founded with Giovanni Spadacini the Tosco company in 1974. In 1979, Robert Zildjian took over Tosco and transformed it in a Sabian subsidiary. One of the main innovation designed by Tosco is the Octagonal cymbal. This particular design inspired the Sabian Rocktagon.

At the beginning UFIP sold his cymbals under commission of various drums companies, initially with Turkish sounding names such as "Zinjian" (commissioned by Pearl, Ludwig and Premier), "Kashian" (commissioned by Slingerland), "Pasha" (commissioned by Rogers), "Ajaha" (commissioned by Gretsch) and "Super Constantinoples" (commissioned by Dolnet). In the United States UFIP cymbals were sold as "Atlas" and "Abraxis" until, in the early nineties, the company began to use the "UFIP" name internationally.

UFiP is being distributed in the United States by Davitt & Hanser music.

== Manufacturing ==
UFIP is known for using the "Rotocasting" technique. This technique was patented (IT000001141690B) by the Zanchi brothers in the seventies. Rotocasting consists in casting molten bronze in a cymbal mold mounted on a centrifuge that spins approximately a thousand revolutions per minute. This particular technique reduces air pockets in the alloy and ensures a thicker bell-to-bow ratio. Most of the UFIP top level cymbal series are manufactured using the Rotocasting technique.
