= List of percussion instruments =

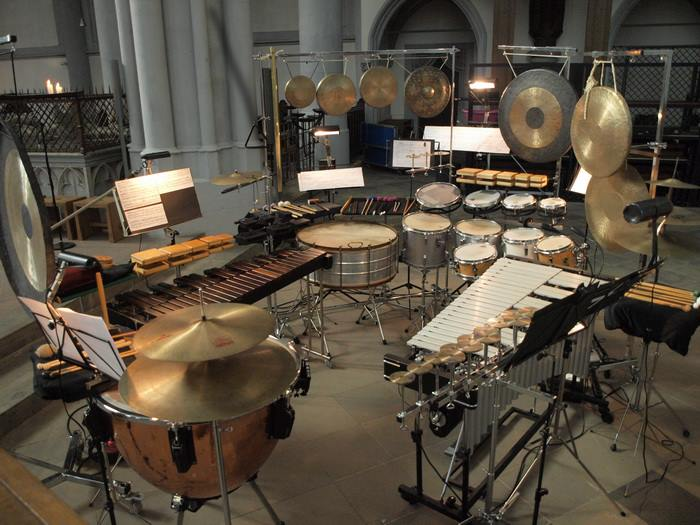
Collection of percussion instruments

This is a wide-ranging, inclusive list of percussion instruments.

It includes:

- Instruments classified by Hornbostel–Sachs as struck or friction idiophones, struck or friction membranophones or struck chordophones. Where an instrument meets this definition but is often or traditionally excluded from the term percussion this is noted.
- Instruments commonly used as unpitched and/or untuned percussion.
- Instruments commonly part of the percussion section of a band or orchestra.

These three groups overlap heavily, but inclusion in any one is sufficient for an instrument to be included in this list. However, when only a specific subtype of the instrument qualifies as a percussion instrument, only that subtype is listed here. For example, a samba whistle (or apito) is an unpitched percussion instrument, but a whistle in general is not.

For brevity, synonyms represented in Wikipedia by redirects to a main article are not listed, but may be mentioned as a note. Only the main article names are listed in these cases. For example, apito is listed but samba whistle is merely noted as an alternate name. A distinct instrument or type represented only by a redirect to an article section should however be shown. Instruments represented only by redlinks have no Wikipedia articles as yet but are shown.

See list of percussion instruments by type for some shorter, more focused lists. Use the sorting arrows on the common usage column to group instruments as pitched, unpitched or both. Use the sorting arrows on the Classification column to group instruments according to their Hornbostel–Sachs classification.

== Percussion instruments ==
Name(s)	Picture	Origin	Common usage Pitched /Unpitched /Both	Hornbostel–Sachs Classification	References and notes
Aburukuwa		Ghana	Unpitched	211 Membranophone	
Afoxé		Brazil	Unpitched	112.122 Idiophone	
Agogô		Yoruba	Unpitched	111.242 Idiophone	Commonly used in Samba.
Agung		Philippines	Unpitched	111.241.2 Idiophone	
Agung a tamlang		Philippines		111.24 Idiophone	
Alarm device			Both		May be electronic or mechanical
Alfaia		Brazil	Unpitched	211.212.1 Membranophone	
Alligator drum		China	Unpitched	211.2 Membranophone	
Angklung		Indonesia	Pitched	111.232 Idiophone	
Anvil			Unpitched	111 Idiophone	A similar-sounding alternative is often used due to the weight of the blacksmith's anvil
Apito		Brazil	Unpitched	421.221.11 Aerophone	Also known as samba whistle. Some apitos produce up to three different tones, but none of these is normally used as a pitched note.
Ashiko		Yoruba	Unpitched	211.251.1 Membranophone	
Atabaque		Brazil	Unpitched	211.221.1 Membranophone 1	
Atumpan		Ghana	Unpitched	211 . 221 . 1 Membranophone	
Axatse		Ghana	Unpitched	454.456 Idiophone	
Babendil		Philippines	Unpitched	111.242.1 Idiophone	
Bak		Korea	Unpitched	111.12 Idiophone	
Balafon		Mali	Pitched	111.212 Idiophone	
Bamboo clapper		Myanmar	Unpitched	321.321.6 Idiophone	
Bamboula	framelss		Unpitched	211.212.1 Membranophone	
Bara	framelss	West Africa	Unpitched	211.11 Membranophone	
Bass drum			Unpitched	211.212.1 Membranophone	
Batá drum		Nigeria	Unpitched	211.242.12 Membranophone	
Beatboxing			Both	4 Aerophone	
Bedug		Indonesia	Unpitched	211.212.1 Membranophone	
Bell		China	Both	111.242 Idiophone	
Bell plate		Asia	Pitched	111.222 Idiophone	
Bell tree			Unpitched	111.242.221 Idiophone	Often confused with mark tree
Bendir		North Africa	Unpitched	211.311 Membranophone	
Berimbau		Brazil	Pitched	Chordophone	
Bianzhong		China	Pitched	Idiophone	
Binzasara		Japan	Unpitched	Idiophone	
Bo			Unpitched	Idiophone	
Bock-a-da-bock			Unpitched	111.1 Idiophone	
Bodhrán		Ireland	Unpitched	211.321 Membranophone	
Body percussion			Unpitched	Membranophone	
Bombo criollo			Unpitched	Membranophone	A family of Latin American drums derived from the European bass drum
Bombo legüero			Unpitched	Membranophone	Argentina
Bonang		Indonesia	Pitched	111.241.2 Idiophone	
Bones (instrument)			Unpitched	111.11 Idiophone	
Bongo drum		Cuba	Unpitched	211.251.2 Membranophone	
Boobam		United States	Unpitched	211.211.1 Membranophone	
Boomwhacker		United States	Pitched	Idiophone	Plastic percussion tubes
Bougarabou		West Africa	Unpitched	211.261.2 Membranophone	
Bubon		Ukraine	Unpitched	232.311 Membranophone	Type of skinned Tambourine
Buk		Korea	Unpitched	211.222.1 Membrarophone	
Cabasa			Unpitched	112.122 Idiophone	
Cajón		Peru	Unpitched	111.24 Idiophone	Box Drum
Cajón de rumba		Cuba	Unpitched	111.24 Idiophone	
Calung		Indonesia	Pitched	111.232 Idiophone	
Carimbo		Africa	Unpitched	Membranophone	
Candombe drums		Uruguay	Unpitched	Membranophone	
Cannon			Unpitched	Pyrophone	Used in 1812 Overture
Cantaro		Mexico			
Carillon		Low Countries	Pitched	111.242.2 Idiophone	A type of bell tower inner workings.
Castanets			Unpitched	111.141 Idiophone	
Catá or guagua		Cuba	Unpitched	Idiophone	
Caxirola		Brazil	Unpitched	Idiophone	
Caxixi		West Africa	Unpitched	112.13	African basket rattle
Celesta		France	Pitched	111.222 Idiophone	As a keyboard instrument, not part of the percussion section of the orchestra
Chácaras		Canary Islands	Unpitched	111.141 Idiophone	
Chenda		India	Unpitched	211.212 Membranophone	
Chime bar			Pitched	111.221 Idiophone	
Chime (bell instrument)			Pitched	111.242.2 Idiophone	
Chimta		South Asia		Idiophone	
China cymbal			Unpitched	111.24 Idiophone	
Cimbalom		Hungary	Pitched	Chordophone	
Clapper			Unpitched	Idiophone	
Clapping			Unpitched	Idiophone	
Clap stick		Australia	Unpitched	111.11 Idiophone	
Clash cymbals			Unpitched	111.142 Idiophone	Better known as crash cymbals
Claves			Unpitched	111.11 Idiophone	
Clavichord			Pitched	314.122-4-8 Chordophone	Sound formed by striking the strings, but played as a keyboard instrument
Cocktail drum			Unpitched	Membranophone	
Conga		Cuba	Unpitched	211.221.1 Membranophone	
Cowbell			Both	111.242 Idiophone	Tuned cowbells are known as almglocken or alpine bells
Crotale			Both	111.24 Idiophone	
Crystallophone			Pitched	Idiophone	
Cuíca		Disputed	Pitched	231.11 Friction Membranophone	
Cultrun		Chile	Unpitched	321.322 Membranophone	
Cup chime			Pitched	111.24 Idiophone	The only pitched cymbal, it is identical to a bell cymbal in all but usage
Cymbal			Unpitched	111 Idiophone	
Dabakan		Philippines	Unpitched	211 Membranophone	Although shape is variously described as goblet, hourglass, conical, or tubular.
Daf		Iran	Unpitched	211.311 Membranophone	Also known as Dafli, Dap, Def, Tef, Defi, Gaval, Duf, and larger ones defi or daire
Damaru		South Asia	Unpitched	212 Membranophone	Type of Pellet drum.
Damphu		Nepal	Unpitched	Membranophone	
Đàn tam thập lục		Vietnam	Pitched	Chordophone	Type of hammered dulcimer.
Davul			Unpitched	211.212 Membranophone	
Daxophone		Germany	Pitched	132.1 Friction Idiophone	Bowed percussion invented by Hans Reichel
Dayereh		Iran	Unpitched	211.311 Membranophone	Also known as doyra, dojra, dajre, doira, dajreja
Den-den daiko		Japan	Unpitched	212 Membranophone	Type of Pellet drum.
Derkach		Ukraine	Unpitched	112.24 Idiophone	Type of ratchett
Dhaa		Nepal	Unpitched	211.212 Membranophone	
Dhimay		Nepal	Unpitched	211.212 Membranophone	
Dholak		South Asia	Both	211.222.1 Membranophone	Also known as dholki, similar to dohl
Dhol		India	Both	211.212.1 Membranophone	The bass head is pitched, the treble often unpitched, see pitched percussion instruments easily mistaken for unpitched
Dimdi		India	Unpitched	211.311 Membranophone	
Djembe		Mandinka	Unpitched	211.261.1 Membranophone	
Dollu		India	Unpitched	211.222.1 Membranophone	
Đông Sơn drums		Vietnam			Bronze drums
Drum				Membranophone	
Drum stick			Unpitched	111.11 Idiophone	
Drum kit		New Orleans	Unpitched	Membranophone	
Dunun		Mandé	Both	211.212.1 Membranophone	In ballet style playing, a repeating melody is played on three pitched drums
Egg shaker			Unpitched	112.13 Idiophone	
Ekwe		Nigeria	Unpitched	111.24 Idiophone	A type of slit drum
Electronic drum		England	Both	53 Electrophone	
Esterilla		Colombia	Unpitched	Idiophone	
Ferrinho		Cape Verde	Unpitched	Idiophone	
Fiddlesticks				Chordophone	
Finger snapping			Unpitched	Idiophone	
Flexatone			Pitched	112.12 Idiophone	
Flower drum		China	Unpitched	Idiophone	
Fontomfrom		Ghana		Membranophone	
Found object					
Frame drum			Unpitched	211.3 Membranophone	
Friction drum			Both	Membranophone	A drum where a stick or chord is drawn through a hole in the membrane to make a sound.
Frog güiro		Thailand			
Galgo		Korea	Unpitched	211.242.1 Membranophone	
Gandingan		Philippines	Unpitched	111.241.2 Idiophone	
Ganzá		Brazil	Unpitched	112.13	
Gbedu		Yoruba	Unpitched	Membranophone	
Gendèr		Indonesia	Pitched	111.222 Idiophone	
Geophone		France	Unpitched	Membranophone	
Ghatam		India	Unpitched	Idiophone	
Glasschord					
Glass harmonica		United States	Pitched	133.2 Idiophone	Specifically a friction Idiophone
Glass harp		Ireland	Pitched	133.2 Idiophone	Specifically a friction Idiophone
Glockenspiel			Pitched	111.212 Idiophone	
Goblet drum			Unpitched	211.261 Membranophone	Generic type by construction, see also individual instrument names
Goema		South Africa	Unpitched	Membranophone	
Gong		Brunei; China; Indonesia; Japan; Korea; Malaysia; Myanmar; Tibet; Vietnam	Pitched	111.241.1 Idiophone	
Gong bass drum		Japan	Unpitched	211.311 Membranophone	
Gonguê		Brazil	Unpitched	111.242 Idiophone	
Gome		Ghana	Unpitched	211.311 Membraphone	
Gudugudu		Yoruba	Pitched	211.11 Membranophone	
Güira		Dominican Republic	Unpitched	112.23 Idiophone	
Güiro		Cuba, Panama		112.23 Idiophone	Also known as scraper
Gumbe		Jamaica, Sierra Leone	Unpitched	211.311 Membraphone	
Hammered dulcimer			Pitched	Chordophone	Listed as a stringed instrument in some classifications
Handbell		England	Both	111.242 Idiophone	
Handchime			Pitched	111.231 Idiophone	
Hand-repique		Brazil		211.211.1 Membranophone	
Handpan			Pitched	111.24 Idiophone	
Hang			Pitched	111.24 Idiophone	
Hi-hat			Unpitched	111.142 Idiophone	
Hosho		Zimbabwe	Unpitched	112.13 Idiophone	
Huiringua					Type of slit drum
Hydraulophone					
Hyoshigi		Japan	Unpitched	111.11 Idiophone	
Igba			Unpitched	Membranophone	
Ikembe		Africa	Pitched	122.1 Idiophone	Lamellophone
Ikoro		Nigeria	Unpitched	111.24 Idiophone	
Ilimba		Zimbabwe	Unpitched	211.11 Membranophone	
Jam block			Unpitched	111.2 Idiophone	
Janggu / Janggo / Changgo		Korea	Pitched	211.242.1 Membranophone	
Jawbone		Peru	Unpitched	112.211 Idiophone	
Jew's harp		China	Pitched	121.22 Lamellophone	
Jhallari		India	Pitched	Chordophone	
Jingle					
Jori		South Asia	pitched	Membranophone	
Junjung		Serer	Unpitched	Membranophone	
Kakko		Japan	Unpitched	211.212.1 Membranophone	
Kanjira		India	Unpitched	211.311 Membranophone	
Karyenda					
Kebero		Ethiopia	Unpitched	Membranophone	
Kecer		Indonesia	Unpitched	111.142 Idiophone	
Kemanak		Indonesia	Pitched	111.24 Idiophone	
Kempyang and ketuk		Indonesia		111.241.1 Idiophone	
Kendang		Southeast Asia	Unpitched	211.222.1 Membranophone	
Kenong		Indonesia	Pitched	111.241.2 Idiophone	
Kepyak		Indonesia	Unpitched	111 Idiophone	
Keyboard glockenspiel			Pitched	111.222 Idiophone	A keyboard instrument, not normally part of a percussion section
Khim		South Asia	Pitched	Chordophone	Type of hammered dulcimer
Khol		India	Unpitched	Membranophone	
Kirikoketa		Basque		Idiophone	
Kiringi					
Kisanji		Congo	Pitched	Lamellaphone	
Klong khaek		Thailand	Unpitched	Membranophone	
Klong yao		Thailand	Unpitched	Membranophone	
Kolotushta			Unpitched	Idiophone	
Kouxian		China	Both	121.2 Idiophone	
Kpanlogo		Ghana	Unpitched	211.221.1 Membranophone	
Kulintang		Southeast Asia	Pitched	111.241.2 Idiophone	
Kundu	,	Papua	Unpitched	211.222.1 Membranophone	Papuan musical instrument
Kus		Persia		Membranophone	Ancient Persian kettledrum
Lambeg		Ireland	Unpitched	211.212 Membranophone	
Lion's roar			Unpitched	232.11 Membranophone	Has also been referred to as a Chordophone or a Friction drum
Lithophone		Global	Pitched	Idiophone	Either natural or placed rock formations which produce differing tones when struck.
Lujon		United States	Pitched	111.222 Idiophone	Bass Metalophone
Lummi stick		Native American	Unpitched	111.11 Idiophone	
Madal		Nepal	Unpitched	Membranophone	
Maddale		India	Unpitched	211.222 Membranophonre	
Madhalam		India	Unpitched	Mambranophone	
Maktoum			Unpitched	Membranophone	
Makuta		Cuba	Unpitched	Membranophone	
Malimbe		Congo	Pitched	111.212 Idiophone	
Mangey		Middle East	Unpitched	Membranophone	
Maraca		Venezuela	Unpitched	112.13 Idiophone	
Maram (drum)		India		Membranophone	
Marching machine			Unpitched	111.212 Idiophone	
Marfa					
Marimba		Africa; Guatemala; Mexico; Honduras; Nicaragua; Costa Rica	Pitched	111.212 Idiophone	
Marímbula		Caribbean	Pitched	122.1 Idiophone	
Mark tree		United States	Unpitched	111.232 Idiophone	Also known as a chime tree or bar chimes
Mbira		Africa	Pitched	122.1 Idiophone	African musical instrument, a type of plucked idiophone (lamellophone)
Metallophone		Asia	Pitched	111.222 Idiophone	
Metronome		Europe	unpitched	Idiophone	Mechanical
Mirwas		Bahrain; Brunei; Indonesia; Oman; Saudi Arabia; Yemen	Both	Membranophone	
Monkey stick		England	Unpitched	112.12 Idiophone	Also known as mendoza or lagerphone
Mridangam		India	Pitched	211.222.1 Membranophone	
Musical saw			Pitched	132.1 Friction Idiophone	
Nagara		Asia; Azerbaijan; Dagestan; Iran; Turkey; Turkmenistan	Unpitched	Membranophone	
Naqara		Mongolia	Unpitched	Membranophone	Large battle drum
Naqareh		Azerbaijan; India; Saudi Arabia; Turkey; Turkmenistan; Uzbekistan	Unpitched	Membranophone	
Naqus		Morocco		Idiophone	
Ngoma drums		Africa	Unpitched	Membranophone	
North Drums		United States	Unpitched	Membranophone	
Obrom		Nigeria			
Ocean drum			Unpitched		
Octoban		Japan	Both	211.211.1 Membranophone	
Omele		Nigeria			
Onavillu		India	Pitched	Chordophone	
Ōtsuzumi		Japan	Pitched	211.242.1 Membranophone	
Padayani thappu		India	Unpitched	Membranophone	
Pahu		Hawaii	Unpitched	Membranophone	
Pahū pounamu		New Zealand	Unpitched	Idiophone	Traditional Maori gong.
Paiban		China	Unpitched	111.11 Idiophone	
Paila criolla		Cuba	Unpitched	Membranophone	
Pakhavaj		India	pitched	211.222.1 Membranophone	
Pambai		India	Unpitched	Membranophone	
Pandeiro		Brazil	Unpitched	211.311 Membranophone	
Pandero jarocho		Mexico	Unpitched	211.311 Membranophone	Octagonal Tambourine
Pantalon		Europe	Pitched	Chordophone	A type of hammered dulcimer.
Parai	Parai - Ancient Tamil Percussion Instrument	India	Unpitched	Membranophone	This instrument finds mention in the Sangam literature and has been used by the ancient Tamil people
Pellet drum			Unpitched	212 Membranophone	
Pixiphone		England	Pitched	111.212 Idiophone	
Practice pad			Unpitched		
Plasmaphone		United States			
Pyrophone					
Quadrangularis Reversum		United States	Pitched	111.212 Idiophone	
Quintephone					
Rainstick		Mexico	Unpitched	112.13 Idiophone	Subclassed as a combination Shaken Idiophone and Individual friction vessel
Rakatak		Ghana	Unpitched	234.345 Idiophone	
Ranat ek		Thailand	Pitched	Idiophone	
Ranat ek lek		Thailand	Pitched	Idiophone	
Ranat thum		Thailand	Pitched	Idiophone	
Ranat thum lek		Thailand	Pitched	Idiophone	
Ratchet			Unpitched	112.24 Idiophone	
Rattle			Unpitched	112.13 Idiophone	
Ravanne		Mauritius	Unpitched		
Rebana		Brunei, Indonesia, Malaysia	Both	211.311 Membranophone	
Repique		Brazil	Unpitched	211.212.1 Membranophone	
Ring of bells			Pitched	Idiophone	
Ring-repique		Brazil	Unpitched	211.212.1 Membranophone	
Ringing rocks				Idiophone	
Riq		Middle East	Unpitched	Membranophone	
Rock gong			Both	111.22 Idiophone	A type of constructed Lithophone
Rototom		United States	Both	211.311 Membranophone	classified it as no handle although it is usually mounted
Sabar		Senegal, The Gambia	Unpitched	Membranophone	
Sakara drum		Yoruba	Unpitched	Membranophone	
Salterio		Europe	Pitched	Chordophone	
Sambal		India	Unpitched	Membranophone	
Samphor		Cambodia	Unpitched	211.222.1 Membranophone	
Sand blocks			Unpitched	13 Idiophone	
Santoor		South Asia	Pitched	Chordophone	
Santur		Iran	Pitched	Chordophone	Type of hammered dulcimer.
Sapp		South Asia			
Saron		Indonesia	Pitched	111.222 Idiophone	Size from smallest to largest is Saron panerus, Saron barung, Saron demung.
Scabellum		Ancient Rome	Unpitched		Often used by the aulos players
Semantron			Both	Idiophone	Used to summon monastics to prayer
Shekere		Brazil; Burkina Faso; Cuba, Gambia; Guinea, Guinea-Bissau; Ivory Coast; Mali; Senegal	Unpitched	112.122 Idiophone	
Shime-daiko		Japan	Unpitched	211.222.1 Membranophone	
Shishi-odoshi		Japan			
Shōko		Japan	Unpitched	Idiophone	
Sikulu		Congo			
Silex Piano			Pitched	Idiophone	Lithophone
Singing bowl		Himalayas	Pitched	111.242.11 Idiophone	
Siren (alarm)		Scotland	Both	Electrophone	
Skrabalai		Lithuania	Pitched	111.242.222 Idiophone	
Skull				Idiophone	
Sleigh bells			Unpitched	112.112 Idiophone	Jingle bells
Slenthem		Indonesia	Pitched	111.222 Idiophone	
Slit drum			Both	111.24 Idiophone	
Snare drum			Unpitched	211.212.1 Membranophone	
Song bells			Pitched	Idiophone	
Sounding stone		China		Idiophone	
Spoon		Greece, Russia, Turkey	Unpitched	111.14 Idiophone	
Steelpan		Trinidad & Tobago	Pitched	111.241.12 and 111.241.22; Idiophone	Also known as steel drum
Stomp box			Unpitched	111.24 Idiophone	
Stone marimba			Pitched	Idiophone	Lithophone
Suikinkutsu		Japan			
Surdo		Brazil	Unpitched	211.212.1 Membranophone	
Suspended cymbal			Unpitched	111.24 Idiophone	
Taal / Manjira		India	Unpitched	111	Also: manjira, karatalas
Tabla		India	Pitched	211.221.2 Membranophone	See pitched percussion instruments easily mistaken for unpitched
Tabla tarang		India	Pitched	Membranophone	
Tabor		Catalonia	Unpitched	Membranophone	
Taiko		Japan	Unpitched	211 Membranophone	Refers to traditional Japanese drums in general.
Talempong		Indonesia	Pitched	Idiophone	
Talking drum		West Africa	Pitched	211.242.11 Membranophone	Has a sound that mimics the human voice
Tambora		Dominican Republic	Unpitched	211.212.1 Membranophone	
Tamborim		Brazil	Unpitched	211.311 Membranophone	
Tamborita calentana		Mexico	Unpitched	Membranophone	
Tamalin		Ghana	Unpitched	211.311 Membraphone	
Tambourine			Unpitched	211.311 Membranophone	But the headless tambourine is an idiophone
Tan-tan		Brazil	Unpitched	211.211.1 Membranophone	
Tap shoe			Unpitched	111.222 Idiophone	
Taphon		Thailand	Unpitched	211.222.1 Membranophone	
Tar (drum)		Saudi Arabia	Unpitched	211.311 Membranophone	
Tassa		India	Unpitched	Membranophone	Type of kettle drum
Tbilat		Morocco, Saudi Arabia	Unpitched	Membranophone	
Teponaztli		El Salvador, Guatemala, Mexico	Both	111.24 Idiophone	
Thappu		India	Unpitched	Membranophone	
Thattai		India	Unpitched	Idiophone	Also known as a patpate.
Thavil		India	Unpitched	211.222.1 Membranophone	
Thunder sheet			Unpitched	111.221 Idiophone	
Tifa (drum)		Maluku Islands; New Guinea	Unpitched	211.221 Membranophone 211.231 Membranophone 211.251 Membranophone	Three kinds: a barrel drum, an hourglass drum and a goblet drum. Not pitched but tone can be changed with wax on drumhead
Timbal		Brazil	Unpitched	211.251.1 Membranophone	
Timbales		Cuba	Unpitched	211.212.2 Membranophone	
Timpani			Pitched	211.11-922 Membranophone	Also called kettle drums
Tingsha		Tibet	Unpitched	111.142 Idiophone	
Tom-tom drum			Pitched	211.211.1 Membranophone	
Tombak		Iran	Unpitched	211.261.1 Membranophone	Persian, also known as tombak, donbak and dombak, and as Tombakh Naar in Kashmir
Triangle		Cajuns	Unpitched	111 Idiophone	
Triccaballacca		Italy	Unpitched	Idiophone	
Tsuzumi		Japan	Pitched	211.242.1 Membranophone	
Tsymbaly		Ukraine	Pitched	Chordophone	Type of hammer dulcimer.
Tubular bells			Pitched	111.232 Idiophone	
Tumba			Unpitched	Membranophone	
Tuning fork		England	Pitched	12 Idiophone	
Turntable			Both	53 Electrophone	
Tumdak'		India	Unpitched	Membranophone	
Turkish crescent			Unpitched	Idiophone	
Txalaparta		Basque	Pitched	111.222 Idiophone	
Uchiwa daiko		Japan			
Udu		Nigeria	Unpitched	Idiophone	Also classed as an implosive Aerophone.
Vehicle horn			Both	Aerophone	
Vibraphone		United States	Pitched	111.222 Idiophone	
Vibraslap		United States	Unpitched	112 Idiophone	
Washboard		Cajuns, United States	Unpitched	132.1 Idiophone	
Whip			Unpitched	111.11 Idiophone	Also known as slapstick
Whistle			Unpitched	Aerophone	
Wind chime			Unpitched	111.232 Idiophone	Borderline as pitched or unpitched, as a melody can sometimes be perceived
Wind machine			Unpitched	13 Idiophone	
Wobble board		Australia			
Wood block			Unpitched	111.24 Idiophone	
Wood scraper block					
Temple blocks		China	Both	111.24 Idiophone	
Xylophone		Ghana, Uganda, Zambia	Pitched	111.212 Idiophone	The xylophone is a musical instrument in the percussion family that consists of wooden bars struck by mallets
Xylorimba			Pitched	111.212 Idiophone	
Yanggeum		Korea	Pitched	Chordophone	A type of Hammer dulcimer
Yangqin		China	Pitched	Chordophone	Type of hammered dulcimer.
Yuka		Congo	Unpitched	Membranophone	Made from a hollowed out avocado trunk with a leather membrane.
Zabumba		Brazil	Unpitched	211.212.1 Membranophone	
Zatula		Ukraine	Unpitched	112.2 Idiophone	
Zill		Asia, Saudi Arabia, Turkey	Unpitched	111.142 Idiophone	Also known as finger cymbal

== See also ==
=== Top-level articles ===
- Percussion instrument
- List of percussion instruments by type
- Classification of percussion instruments

=== Subgroups of percussion instruments ===
- Membranophone
- Idiophone
- Melodic percussion instrument
- Mallet percussion
- Keyboard percussion

=== Categories ===
Only the more significant subcategories are shown

- Category:Percussion instruments
  - Category:Membranophones
    - Category:Drums
  - Category:Idiophones
    - Category:Cymbals
  - Category:Pitched percussion instruments
  - Category:Percussion instruments by means of sound production
  - Category:Percussion instruments by playing technique
  - Category:Percussion instruments by usage
