= Classification of percussion instruments =

There are several overlapping schemes for the classification of percussion instruments.

These schemes are based on four types of criteria:

- The means by which the sound is produced. The most widely used classification system for musical instruments, Hornbostel–Sachs, takes this approach.
- Musical usage, in particular the traditional division into tuned percussion and untuned percussion, and the similar and more modern division into pitched percussion and unpitched percussion.
- The means of playing the instrument and skills required to play it, for example the grouping together of mallet percussion instruments, or of hand percussion instruments. This underlies the division of the orchestral percussion section into auxiliary percussion, tuned percussion and timpani, and is the reason percussive keyboard instruments such as the celesta are excluded from the percussion section.
- Origins, cultural significance or tradition, for example grouping instruments as Latin percussion or as African drums. This criterion overlaps but is not a subset of the usage criterion; Both Latin percussion and African drums also refer to some extent to current usage.

Percussion instruments vary enormously in nature and usage, and have possibly the longest history of any group of musical instruments. For these and other reasons their classification proves difficult, and different classification systems are used in different contexts.

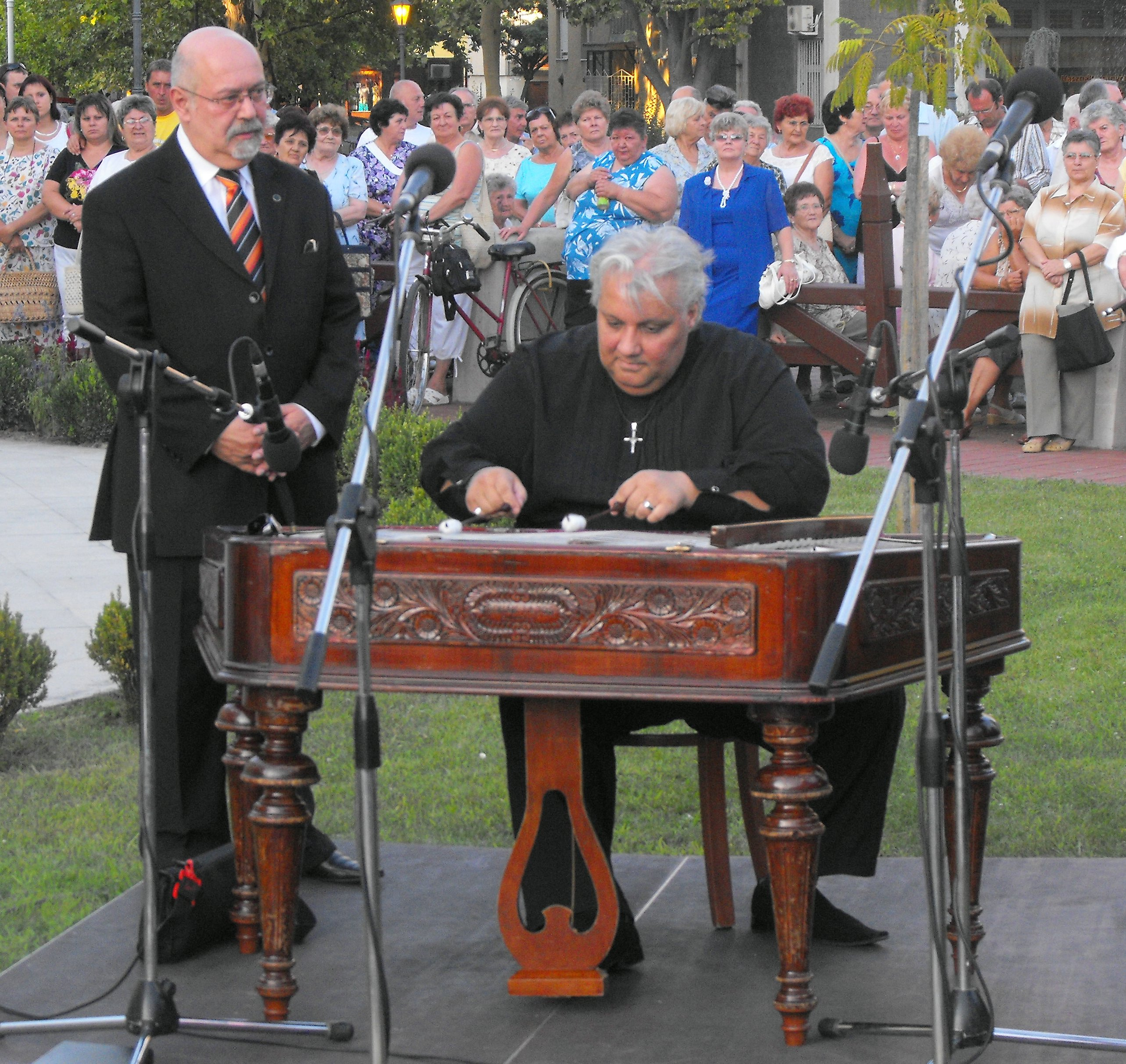
Cimbalom

At the highest level of grouping, authorities differ over whether stringed instruments such as the hammered dulcimer and keyboard instruments such as the celesta are percussion instruments, let alone the piano which is both stringed and a keyboard and yet sometimes also termed percussion.

Hornbostel–Sachs does not use the term percussion as a general grouping at all, but instead in a very different sense to the common usage. Instruments such as castanets and cymbals used in pairs are not percussion in the Hornbostel–Sachs sense, but are percussion instruments in every other sense.

Similar problems are encountered at lower levels of classification.

== By means of sound production ==
Ancient Chinese and Indian systems of classification were based on the materials of which the instruments were constructed, and the acoustic properties of the instruments, respectively.

In the 14th century Jean de Muris produced a classification system which divided all musical instruments into three classes: Percussion, String and Wind. Hornbostel–Sachs further develops this scheme, but abandons the percussion high-level grouping, replacing it by the groups idiophones and membranophones.

=== Hornbostel–Sachs ===
Hornbostel–Sachs classifies musical instruments by means of a numerically labelled inverted tree structure, originally with four groups at the highest level, two of which are percussion instruments (as the term percussion is normally understood), and the others strings and wind. The system does use the term percussion but at a much lower level in the tree and in an esoteric sense quite unlike its common usage, see below.

Some of the important percussion groupings are:

- 1 Idiophones
  - 11 Struck idiophones
    - 111 Directly struck idiophones
      - 111.1 Concussion idiophones or clappers – Two or more complementary sonorous parts are struck against each other
        - 111.11 Concussion sticks or stick clappers
        - 111.14 Concussion vessels or vessel clappers
          - 111.141 Castanets – Natural and hollowed-out vessel clappers
          - 111.142 Cymbals – Vessel clappers with manufactured rim
      - 111.2 Percussion idiophones – The instrument is struck either with a non-sonorous object (hand, stick, striker) or against a non-sonorous object (human body, the ground)
        - 111.21 Percussion sticks
          - 111.212 Sets of percussion sticks in a range of different pitches combined into one instrument, such as a xylophone provided its sounding components are not in two different planes
        - 111.22 Percussion plaques
          - 111.222 Sets of percussion plaques, such as the lithophone
        - 111.23 Percussion tubes
          - 111.232 Sets of percussion tubes, such as tubular bells
        - 111.24 Percussion vessels, such as the suspended cymbal
          - 111.241 Gongs – The vibration is strongest near the vertex
            - 111.241.1 Individual gongs
            - 111.241.2 Sets of gongs
          - 111.242 Bells – The vibration is weakest near the vertex
            - 111.242.1 Individual bells
            - 111.242.2 Sets of bells or chimes
      - 112 Indirectly struck idiophones – the player himself does not go through the movement of striking; percussion results indirectly through some other movement by the player.
        - 112.1 Shaken Idiophones or rattles – The player makes a shaking motion.
          - 112.13 Vessel rattles – Rattling objects enclosed in a vessel strike against each other or against the walls of the vessel, or usually against both, such as maracas
        - 112.2 Scraped Idiophones – The player causes a scraping movement directly or indirectly; a non-sonorous object moves along the notched surface of a sonorous object, to be alternately lifted off the teeth and flicked against them; or an elastic sonorous object moves along the surface of a notched non-sonorous object to cause a series of impacts (this group must not be confused with that of friction idiophone
  - 12 Plucked idiophones such as the jew's harp
  - 13 Friction idiophones such as Rub rods
- 2 Membranophones
  - 21 Struck Membranophones – Sound is produced by hitting the drumskin with a hand or object
    - 211 Directly Struck Membranophones – Instruments in which the membrane is struck directly
      - 211.1 Instruments in which the body of the drum is dish- or bowl-shaped, such as the kettle drum
        - 211.11 Single instruments
        - 211.12 Sets of instruments, such as orchestral timpani
      - 211.2 Tubular Drums – Instruments in which the body is tubular
        - 211.21 Cylindrical Drums – Instruments in which the body has the same diameter at the middle and end
          - 211.211 Instruments with one usable membrane such as the concert tom, gong drum, octoban and timbales
          - 211.212 Instruments which have two usable membranes such as the snare drum, bass drum and most tom-tom drums
            - 211.212.1 Single instruments such as the side drum

For a complete list of idiophone classes see:

- List of idiophones by Hornbostel–Sachs number.
- List of musical instruments by Hornbostel-Sachs number: 111.

Hornbostel–Sachs does not distinguish between pitched and unpitched instruments at any level.

==== The term percussion in Hornbostel–Sachs ====
It should be particularly noted that this classification does not use the term percussion in its high level grouping, but instead in an esoteric sense, so that other instruments such as the clarinet that are not percussion in any normal sense are described as percussion reeds.

Having no explicit category for percussion as normally understood, Hornbostel–Sachs places nearly all percussion instruments in the high level categories of membranophones (high-level category 2, drums and similar) and idiophones (high-level category 1, cymbals, bells, xylophone-like instruments and similar). A few instruments that are sometimes considered percussion are classified as chordophones (high-level category 3, such as the hammered dulcimer) and as aerophones (high-level category 4, such as the samba whistle). Conversely, the members of the Hornbostel–Sachs high-level categories 1 and 2 nearly all fall clearly or loosely into the conventional category of percussion.

Hornbostel–Sachs does use the term percussion to divide the third-level category directly struck idiophones (111) into percussion idiophones (111.2), those beaten with a hand or beater, such as a suspended cymbal, and concussion idiophones (111.1), those beaten together in pairs such as clash cymbals. The term is also used in a loosely related way to divide reed aerophones (422) into single reed instruments (422.2) with a single 'reed' consisting of a percussion lamella (our emphasis) and double reeds (422.1) also called concussion reeds.

=== Other systems ===
Several older systems divide instruments into two high-level classes:

- Those in which the principle vibration is that of a solid object, including idiophones, membranophones and stringed instruments.
- Those in which the principle vibration is that of air or another fluid, including all aerophones.

This system was developed by André Schaeffner into a comprehensive classification scheme in 1932.

== By usage ==
=== Pitched and unpitched ===
Percussion is traditionally divided into pitched percussion, which produces a sensation of pitch, and unpitched percussion, which does not. Some instruments, such as bells, are commonly used in both roles.

The traditional terms tuned percussion and untuned percussion have fallen from favour, replaced loosely by the terms pitched and unpitched, see Unpitched percussion instrument#Untuned percussion.

== By tradition ==
By far the most common way of classifying percussion is by the style or tradition with which it is most closely associated.

=== Western music ===
==== Orchestral percussion ====
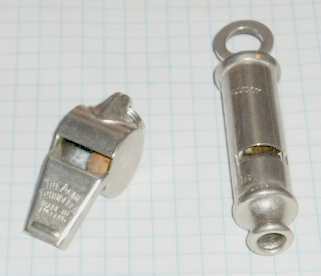
Although they are aerophones, whistles such as these are played by percussionists in the orchestra

An orchestral percussion section is traditionally divided into:

- Tuned percussion, consisting of pitched percussion instruments.
- Auxiliary percussion, consisting of unpitched percussion instruments.
- Timpani.

Keyboard instruments such as the celesta are not normally part of the percussion section, as the playing skills required are significantly different.

== Other criteria ==
Some percussion instruments may be classified according to the material of which they, or their sounding component, are constructed. In this way some idiophones for example are sometimes grouped together as metallophones and others as lithophones.

This scheme does not have any wider acceptance, to the point that some terms that might be used in such schemes have meanings in general usage that are inconsistent with it. For example, the serpent is a brass instrument although composed of wood, while many gongs and some cymbals are composed of brass but are not brass instruments, and the modern orchestral flute is a woodwind instrument although composed of silver and/or other metals.

== See also ==
=== Articles ===
- Musical instrument classification
  - Hornbostel–Sachs
    - Idiophone
    - Membranophone
- List of percussion instruments
  - List of percussion instruments by type
- Percussion instrument
  - Unpitched percussion instrument
  - Pitched percussion instrument
    - Melodic percussion
      - Mallet percussion
  - Orchestral percussion
  - Percussion section

=== Categories ===
- Category:Percussion instruments
  - Category:Percussion instruments by means of sound production
  - Category:Percussion instruments by playing technique
  - Category:Percussion instruments by usage
