= List of percussion instruments by type =

This is a list of percussion instruments.

== Tuned percussion ==
- Cimbalom
- Crotales
- Dhol
- Dholki
- Gong
- Glass harmonica
- Hammered dulcimer
- Handbells
- Hang
- Lithophone
- Marimba
- Metallophone
- Mridangam
- Glockenspiel
- The harp stop and other effects on the organ
- Quadrangularis Reversum
- Skrabalai
- Steel drums
- Tabla
- Timpani (kettle drum)
- Tubular bell
- Vibraphone
- Xylophone
- Xylorimba

== Auxiliary percussion (Untuned percussion) ==
- Agogo bells
- Anvil
- Dayereh (doyra)
- Frame drum
- Finger cymbals
- Flexatone
- Glass harp
- Jam blocks
- Jordan Slap
- Knee Slap
- Marching machine
- Monkey stick (mendoza or lagerphone)
- Ratchet
- Rattle
- Sand blocks
- Siren
- Slapstick (whip or woodcrack)
- Jingle bells (sleigh bells)
- Slide whistle
- Tambourine
- Tambour
- Taxi horn
- Temple blocks
- Thunder machine
- Thundersheet
- Triangle
- Vibraslap
- Whistle
- Wind chime
- Wind machine
- Wood block
- Snare Drum
- Bass Drum
- Cymbals
- Suspended cymbal
- Brake drum

== Persian percussion ==
- Tombak
- Daf
- Dayereh
- Esarkoten
- Dohol

== Latin/Afro-Caribbean percussion ==
- Afoxé
- Alfaia
- Atabaque
- Agogô
- Batá drum
- Bond
- Bongo drums
- Cabasa
- Castanets
- Cajón (box drums)
- Caxixi
- Chácaras
- Claves
- Conga
- Cowbell
- Cuíca
- Djembe
- Dunun
- Ganzá
- Gonguê
- Güiro (a.k.a. scraper)
- Hand-repique
- Ilu
- Jawbone (instrument)
- Maracas
- Pandeiro
- Repique
- Ring-repique
- Shekere
- Surdo
- Tambora
- Tamborim
- Tan-tan
- Timbal
- Timbales
- Zabumba
- Zill

== Indian percussion ==
- Thavil
- Pakhawaj
- Mridangam
- Kachhi Dhol
- Manjeeras
- Kanjeera
- Ghungroos

== See also ==
- List of percussion instruments
- Brass instruments
- Drum kit
- Gamelan
- Latin percussion
- List of membranophones
- Percussion instruments
- String instruments
- Tuned percussion
- Untuned percussion
- Woodwind instruments
