= Maktoum =

Type of Arabic bass drum

Maktoum or maktoom, also known as katem, is a traditional Arabic unpitched percussion instrument. It is similar to a large round bass drum, it is played while held between knees.
