= Obrom =

Percussion musical instrument

An obrom is a type of musical instrument in the percussion family, originating in Nigeria. Formed from one large piece of wood, often a log of paduc, the obrom has two recesses connected to each other by a small channel. This is why it is sometimes referred to as a slit dum. The obrom, when struck with mallets near the recesses, plays two to four tones; these are generally alternated in a repetitive beat or played in ostinato. It was used as an instrument for communication, transferring messages in a way similar to the Morse code.
