= Esterilla =

Unpitched percussion instrument

The esterilla is a traditional percussion instrument from Colombia. The esterilla consists of long, narrow pieces of wood woven together in a similar fashion as a placemat. The instrument is played by either bending it or rubbing it against itself. This instrument dates back to the 1960s.
