= Kiringi =

The kiringi is a wooden log-drum from Sierra Leone and Guinea.

The instrument is formed from a piece of tree stump about 50 cm long. This is hollowed out and closed at both ends. Three incisions are made in the surface to create two freely-vibrating tongues, which are struck with wooden mallets.

== Sources ==
- Curt Sachs: Kiringi. In: Real-Lexikon der Musikinstrumente. Georg Olms Verlag, Hildesheim 1972
