= Pitched percussion instrument =

Percussion musical instrument that produces sounds with a definite pitch

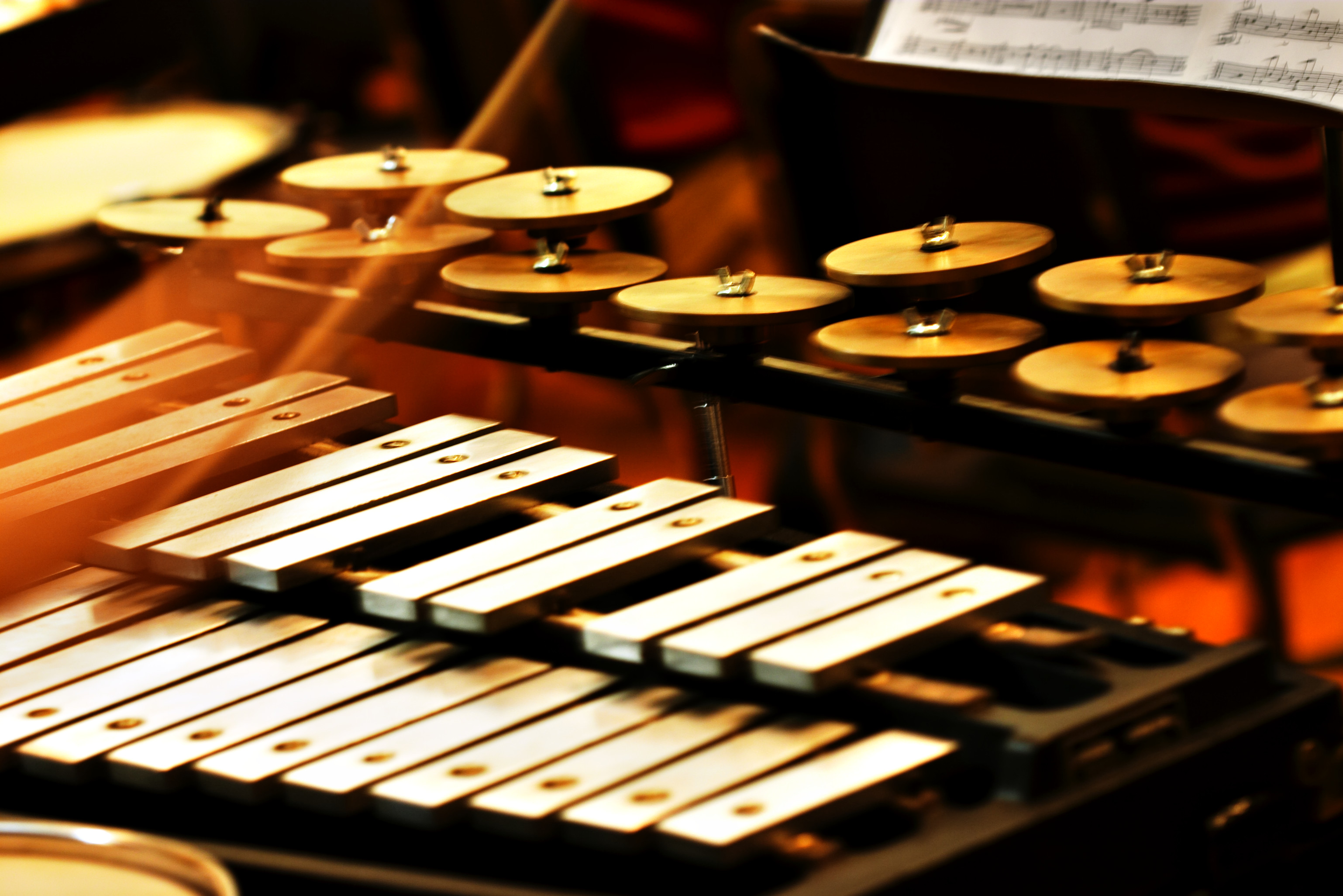
A glockenspiel and a set of crotales in use

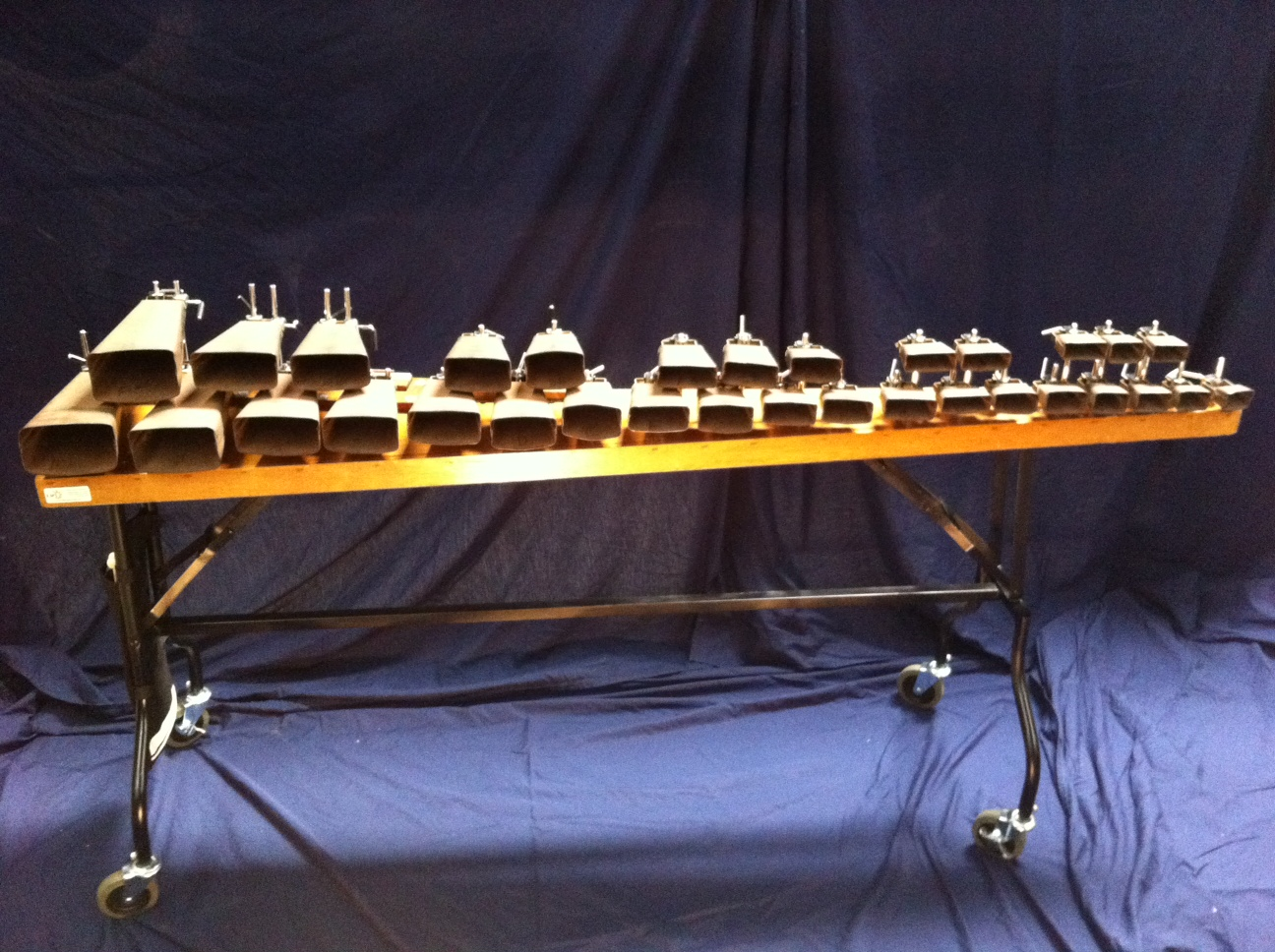
While individual cowbells are generally considered unpitched, sets such as these can be found in a chromatic arrangement.

A pitched percussion instrument (also known as a melodic or tuned percussion instrument) is a percussion instrument used to produce musical notes of one or more pitches, as opposed to an unpitched percussion instrument which is used to produce sounds of indefinite pitch.

Pitching of percussion instruments is achieved through a variety of means.

- Membranophones (such as timpani) are tuned by altering the surface tension of the face that is struck.
- Idiophones (such as xylophone) gain their pitch through the physical characteristics (such as composition, density, and physical dimensions) of each respective bar.

The term pitched percussion is now preferred to the traditional term tuned percussion:

- Many untuned percussion instruments (such as the bass drum) are tuned by the player, but this tuning does not relate to a particular pitch.
- Untuned percussion instruments can and frequently do make sounds that could be used as pitched notes in an appropriate context.

This second consideration also means that the traditional division into tuned and untuned percussion is to some extent oversimplified:

- Some percussion instruments (such as the timpani and glockenspiel) are almost always used as pitched percussion.
- Some percussion instruments (particularly, many types of bell and closely related instruments) are sometimes used as pitched percussion and, at other times, as unpitched percussion.
- Some percussion instruments (such as the snare drum) are almost always used as unpitched percussion.

Pitched percussion includes the class of:

- Keyboard percussion instruments (such as the glockenspiel and tubular bells) which are arranged in a keyboard layout (but not including the celesta and other instruments using an actual keyboard mechanism).

== See also ==
- List of percussion instruments
- Pitch
- Pitched percussion instruments easily mistaken for unpitched
- Unpitched percussion instrument
  - Auxiliary percussion
  - Untuned percussion
  - Indefinite pitch
