= Marching machine =

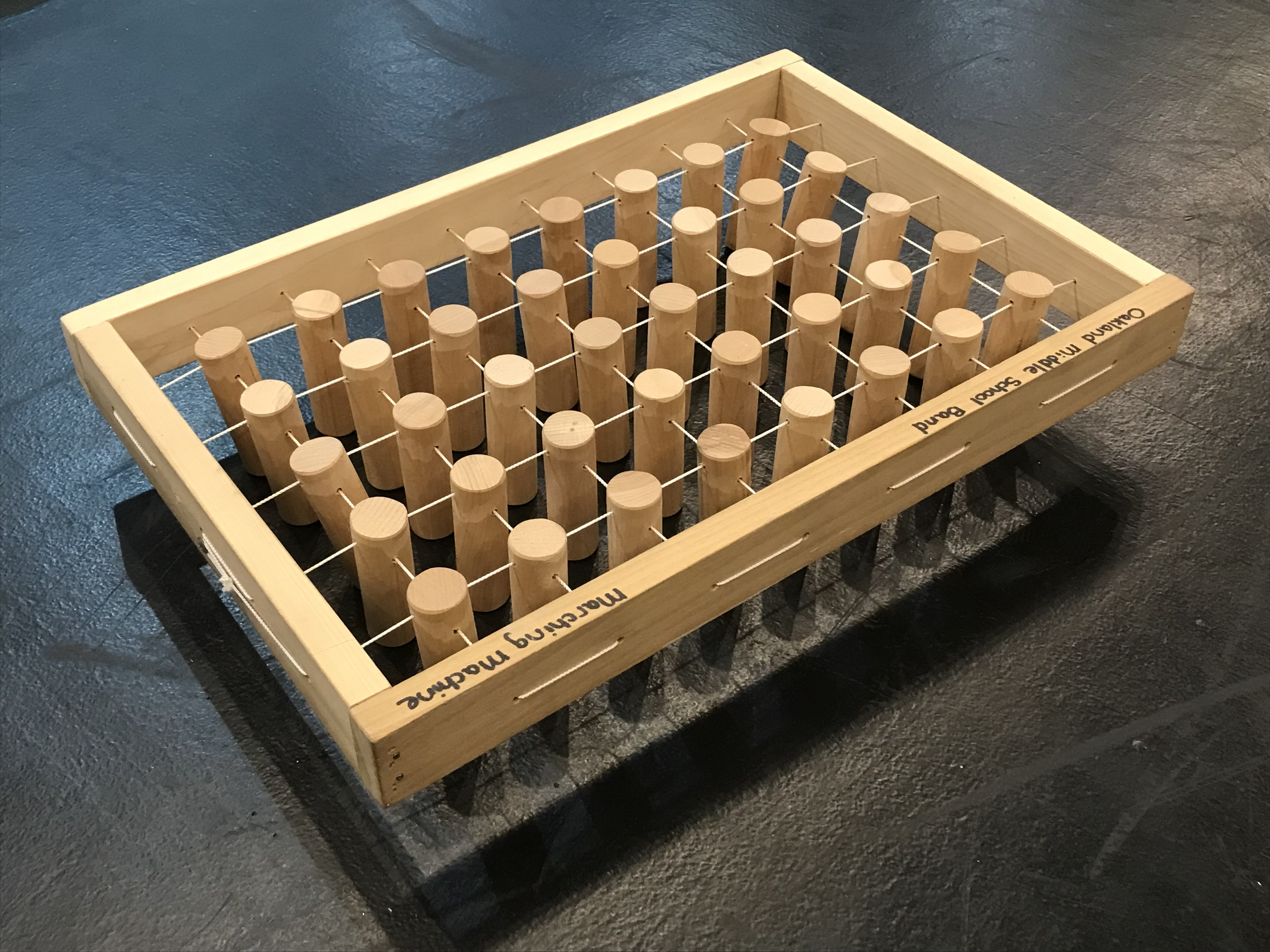
A marching machine.

A marching machine is a percussion instrument designed to produce the sound of marching feet when played on a wooden or metal surface. It is constructed from a number of short pieces of wooden dowel suspended by string netting within a wooden frame.

A marching machine being played on a stage floor.
