= Unpitched percussion instrument =

Percussion instrument played to produce sounds of indeterminate pitch

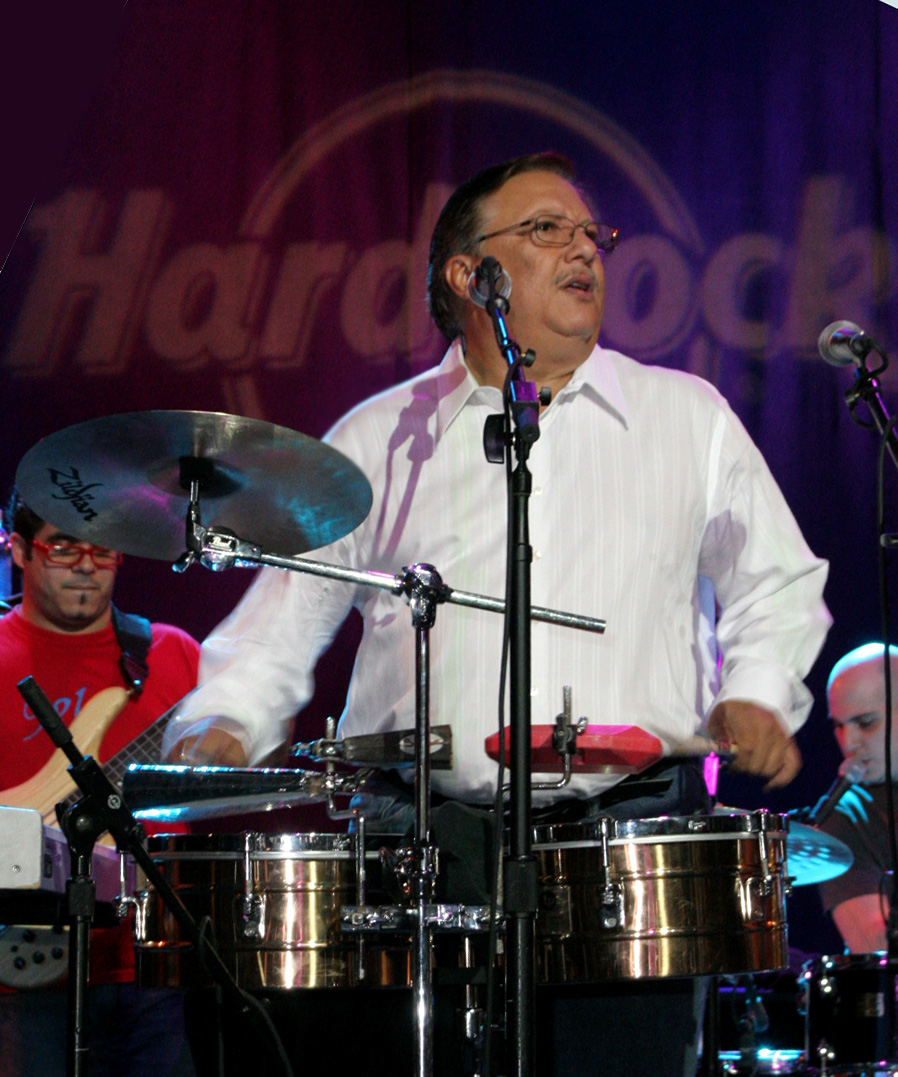
A pair of timbales, two cowbells, a jam block and a cymbal all in use as unpitched percussion

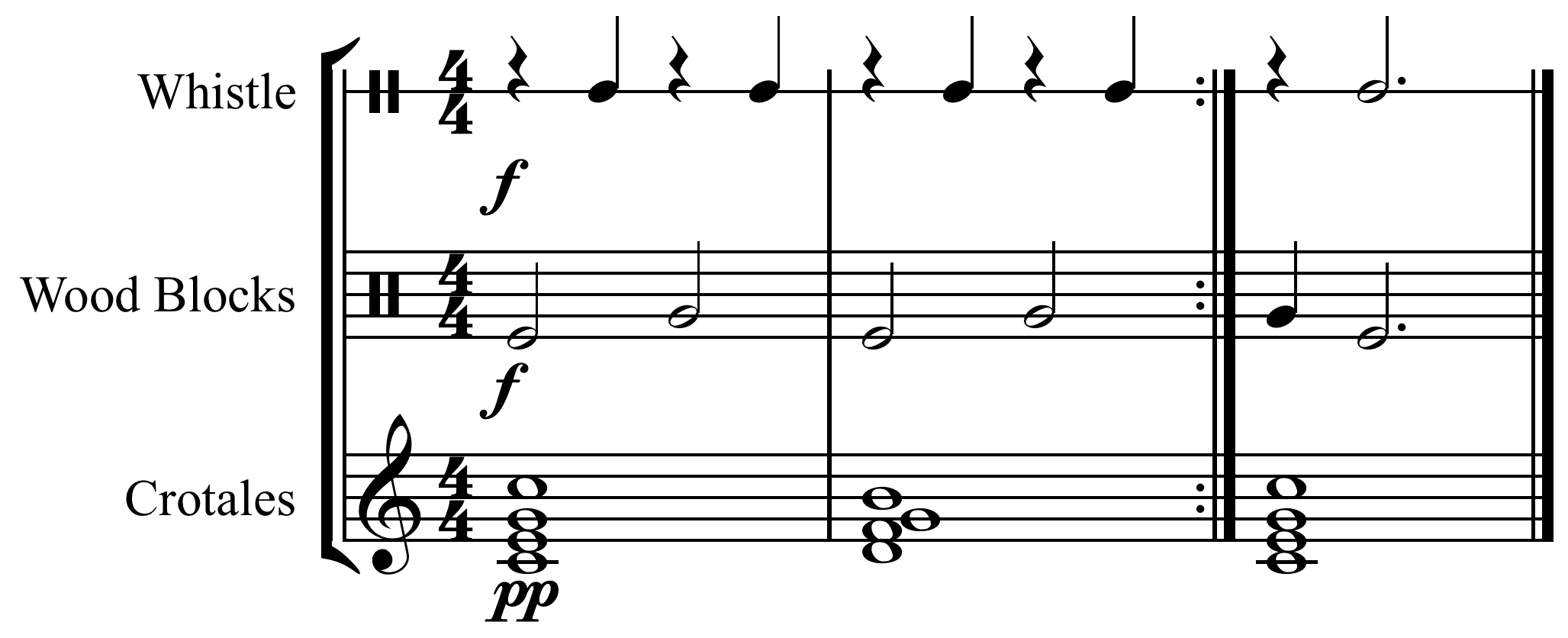
Three instruments on the spectrum between pitched and unpitched: whistle, woodblocks, crotales

An unpitched percussion instrument is a percussion instrument played in such a way as to produce sounds of indeterminate pitch, or an instrument normally played in this fashion.

Unpitched percussion is typically used to maintain a rhythm or to provide accents, and its sounds are unrelated to the melody and harmony of the music. Within the orchestra, unpitched percussion is termed auxiliary percussion, and this subsection of the percussion section includes all unpitched instruments of the orchestra however they are played, for example the pea whistle and siren.

A common and typical example of an unpitched instrument is the snare drum, which is perceived as unpitched for three reasons:

- The snares produce sounds similar to white noise, masking definite frequencies.
- The drum heads produce inharmonic sounds.
- The strongest frequencies that are present are unrelated to pitched sounds produced by other instruments in the ensemble. Although the drum is tuned by the player, this tuning does not relate to the pitches of other instruments.

The snare drum illustrates the three main ways in which a sound can be perceived as indeterminate in pitch:

- The sound may lack any fundamental frequency sufficiently loud to produce a sensation of pitch, for example a sound consisting of noise, or a mixture of sounds containing a great deal of such noise.
- The sound may be inharmonic, a mixture of sounds including some with conflicting fundamental frequencies. The sound of a freely resonating membrane such as a drum head, for example, contains strong overtones at irrational ratios to its fundamental, unlike a vibrating string whose overtones are at simple whole-number ratios to the fundamental.
- The fundamental frequency may simply be unexpected, and unrelated to other sounds in the piece of music. A heavy rock drummer playing on the bell of a ride cymbal, for example, produces a sound with a strong fundamental, but the pitch is unrelated to the music. This is unpitched percussion, despite the recognisable pitch of the sound if heard in isolation.

In practice, two or all of these mechanisms are frequently in effect in producing the sensation of an instrument being unpitched, but any one can be sufficient.

Many unpitched percussion instruments do, or can, produce a sound with a recognisable fundamental frequency, and so can also be used as pitched percussion. The pitch of a bell is particularly strong however struck. The sound of a floor tom played with normal drumsticks is inharmonic, but the same drum played with the mallets and in the fashion of a timpani can produce a recognisable pitch, without requiring any retuning.

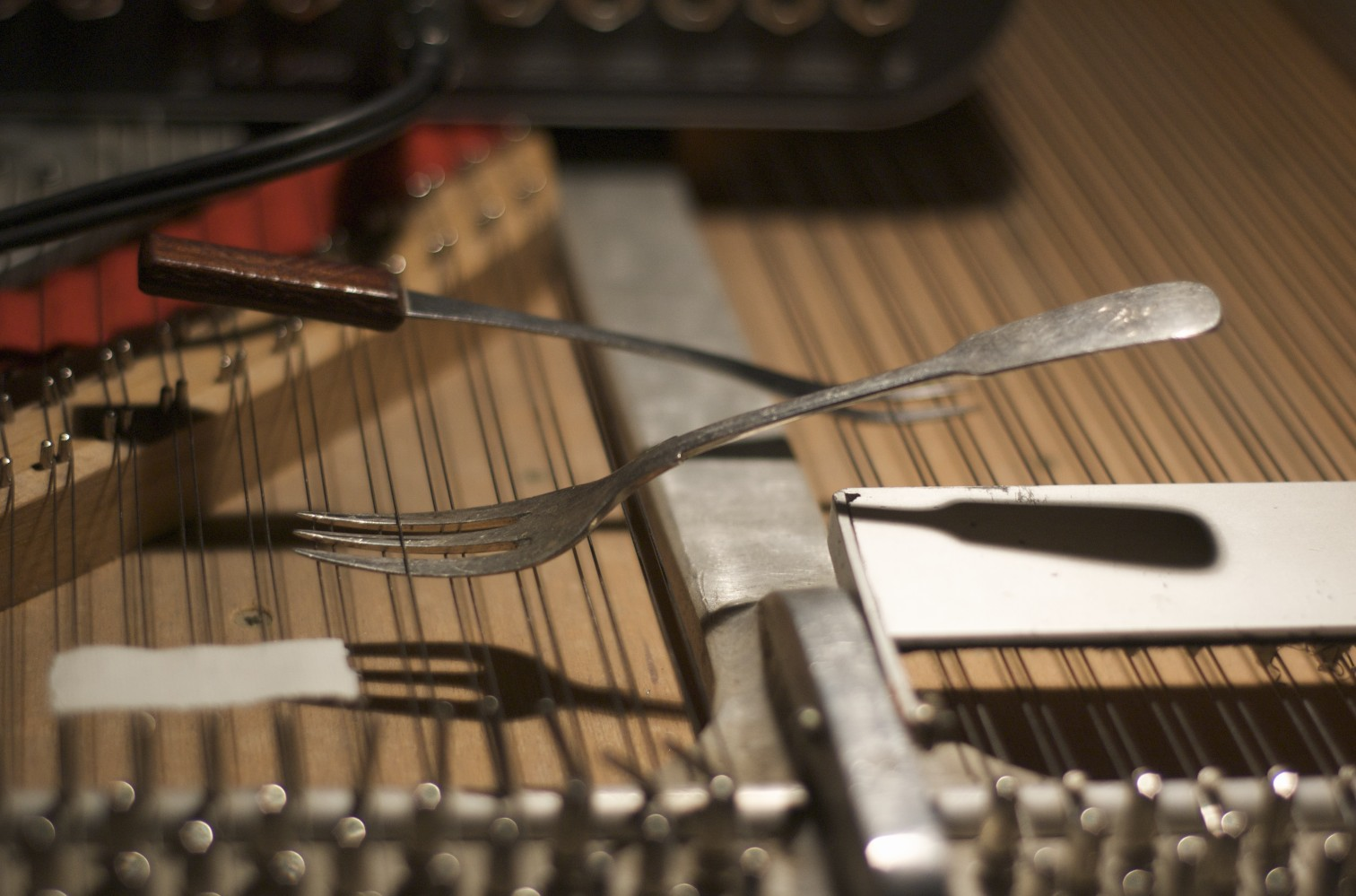
Andrea Neumann's prepared piano, Goethe-Institut, Boston, 2010, showing a dinner knife, a dinner fork, a piece of felt and a piece of cardboard interfering with the normal movement of the strings.

More radically, pitched instruments can be used to produce unpitched sounds, for example a prepared piano, or the golpe technique of flamenco music.

== Pitch within unpitched percussion ==
Within a set of unpitched percussion instruments, there is commonly a sense of higher and lower pitch, for example:

- The smaller of a set of two timbales or bongo drums is tuned higher than the larger.
- The smaller tom-tom drums in a drum kit are tuned higher than the larger ones. Three or more tom-toms are common, each tuned higher than the larger ones and lower than the smaller ones.
- The male pair in a set of castanets is lower in pitch than the female.

These pitches however:

- Relate only to other members of the set, or to related unpitched instruments (for example the bass drum to the tom-toms in a drum kit), rather than to the pitched instruments in the ensemble.
- Bear no harmonic relationship one to the other.

If either of these two conditions is not met, then the instrument could be considered pitched.

== Examples ==
=== Unpitched percussion ===
- Nearly all cymbals.
- Most drums.
- All rattles, for example maracas.
- The triangle.

=== Pitched percussion instruments easily mistaken for unpitched ===
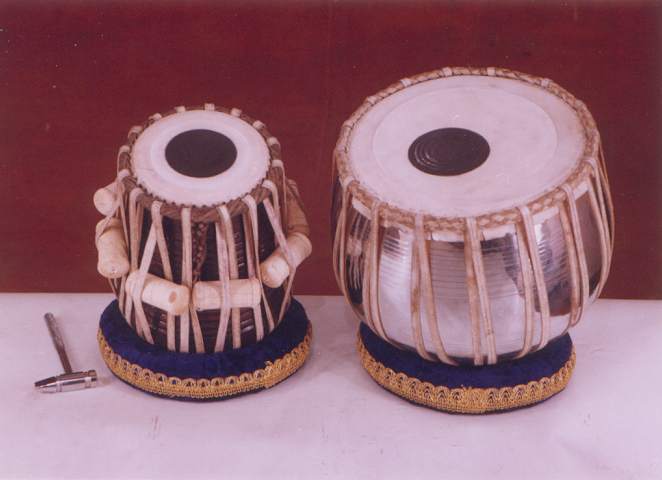
The tabla, left, is tuned to the tonic, dominant or subdominant of the soloist's key and thus complements the melody. Its drum head is reinforced at the centre to reduce inharmonic overtones.

Many folk instruments and world music instruments are tuned to match the pitch of a particular degree of the scale of the music, including:

- The tabla.
- The bass head of the dhol.

These harmonic relationships may or may not be understood by the players themselves, but are consistently produced by skilled performers within the tradition, and this skill in tuning is passed on to their students. Failure to recognise these relationships is a common cause for such instruments sounding bad in the hands of beginners and players from other traditions, when heard by those familiar with the tradition.

=== Instruments used in both roles ===
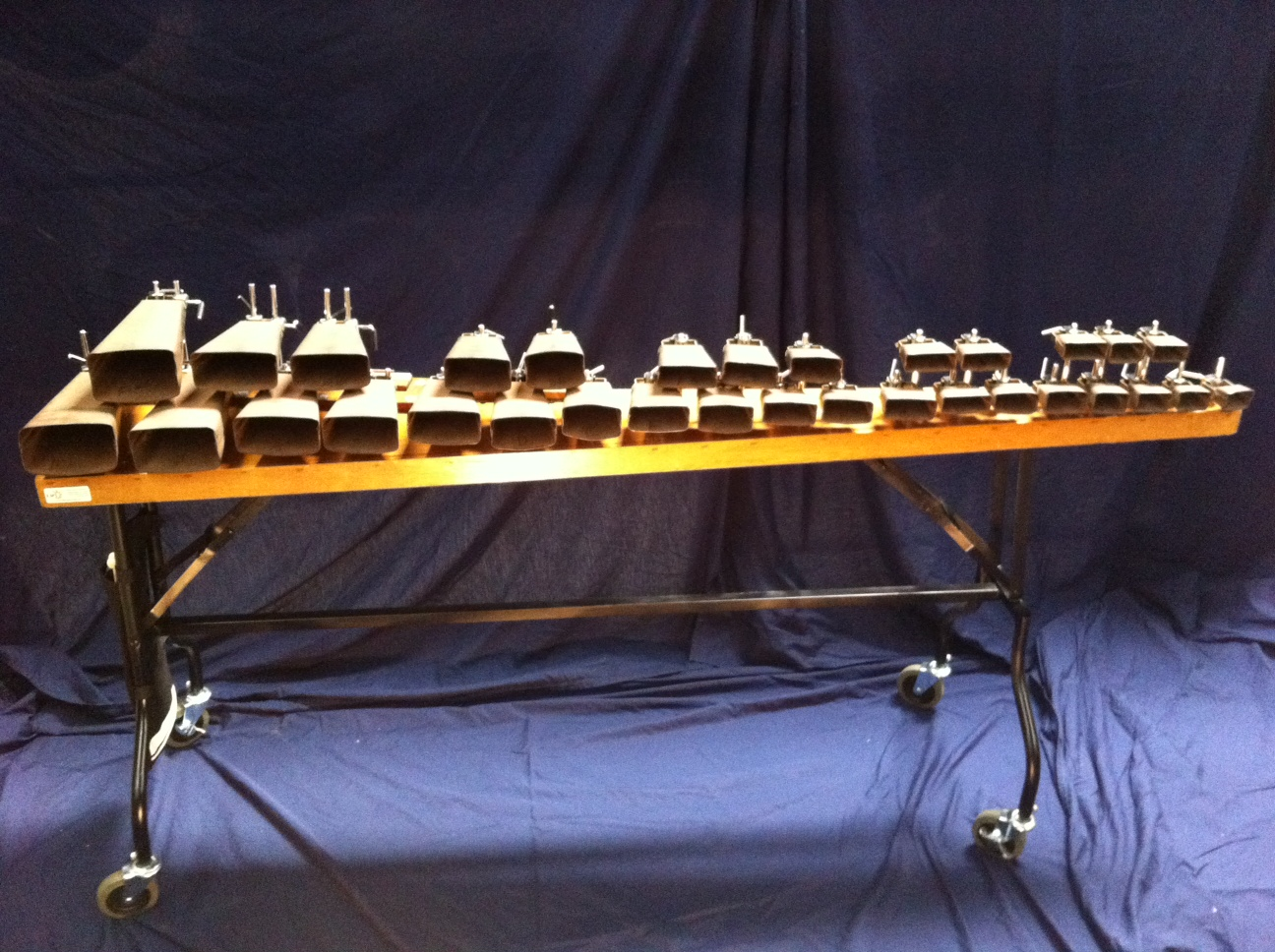
The cowbell is most often used as unpitched percussion, but here is a pitched set

Instruments regularly used both as pitched and as unpitched percussion include many types of bells. Lincoln Cathedral, for example, has three bell towers, two containing bells used as unpitched including a chiming clock, and the third containing a pitched ring of bells.

== Untuned percussion ==
Traditionally, unpitched percussion instruments are referred to as untuned percussion, and this remains a common concept and term, and a common name for the auxiliary percussion subsection of the percussion section of the orchestra. However, the terms tuned percussion and untuned percussion are avoided in recent organology, for two main reasons:

- Many untuned percussion instruments are tuned by the player, for example the snare drum, but this tuning does not relate to producing a perceived pitch.
- Many percussion instruments are used in both pitched and unpitched roles in different styles or pieces of music, for example the cowbell, and during the 20th century there was much experimentation in using instruments normally used in one role or the other for the opposite role, further blurring the distinction between the two types. The term unpitched refers to the usage and perception of the sound of the instrument rather than simply to its sound, which is the more recent approach.

== See also ==
- Classification of percussion instruments
- Inharmonicity
- List of percussion instruments
- Percussion notation
- Pitched percussion instrument
