= Apito =

Variety of whistles

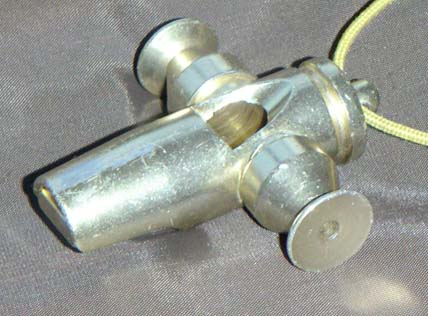

Percussion instrument
- Other names: Apito de Samba or Samba whistle.
- Classification: Aerophone
- Hornbostel–Sachs classification: 421.221.11 (Whistle)
- Developed: Brazil

Apito, which is the Portuguese word for "whistle", refers to any of a variety of whistles.

== Purpose ==
The apito de samba ("samba whistle") is used during performances of samba. In a samba school, the apito de samba plays a crucial role because during these performances, the mestre de bateria – the "band leader" – uses the whistle to signal transitions to the band. These transitions could include changes in timbre or rhythmic pattern. The origins of the apito are undoubtedly a fairly simple instrument, but has developed as a standard today into a whistle capable of giving three notes. The LP Tri-Tone Samba Whistle shown here has its origins in Brazilian music but has become a standard in today's dance music as well. It has three distinct, complementary tones that are achieved by placing fingers over the side chamber holes in various combinations.

The rhythms played on apitos de samba are endless and often change throughout a batucada performance.

Outside Brazil, especially in Europe, the samba whistle is also used as a rhythm instrument. This part is not necessarily done by the band leader.

Samba whistle and maracas

The samba whistle is easy to learn, so it is also a suitable toy musical instrument for children. In samba music, the samba whistle is a perfect supplement for the maracas or other shakers. This requires a very loud shaker so the whistle does not drown them out.

== Types of apitos ==
Samba band leaders can choose to either play a single-tone apito – common referee whistle – or a tri-tone apito. Apitos were traditionally made of wood, but now most are made of metal. The whistle is a chamber that has a small ball or dowel rod inside. When one blows air through the mouthpiece, the small ball or dowel rod moves around the chamber and hits its sides.

== Sound characteristics ==
Since the apito de samba has a small ball or dowel rod that hits the sides of the whistle's chamber, this instrument creates a loud and shrill sound, which is useful in a samba school because the sound can be heard over the playing of the band. However one can manipulate the sound of the whistle by changing the speed at which one is blowing air through the instrument and by changing one's embouchure.

Audio example of variations in apito de samba can be found online.

Sound of a wood samba whistle can be also heard online (1:46 – 2:08).

=== Single-tone vs tri-tone apitos ===
Band leaders using single-tone apitos can choose to hold the instrument between their teeth and create signals with both the whistle and their hands to conduct. Band leaders with tri-tone apitos hold the instrument with one hand and can use the other hand to conduct.

Tri-tone apitos have three holes – one on the top, one on the left, and one on the right. One can manipulate the pitch being played by covering either or both of the holes on the sides of the instrument using a thumb and/or index finger. Covering none of the holes creates the highest pitch, while covering either of the two side holes creates the middle pitch, and covering both side holes creates the apito's lowest pitch.
