= Keyboard percussion instrument =

Type of pitched percussion instrument

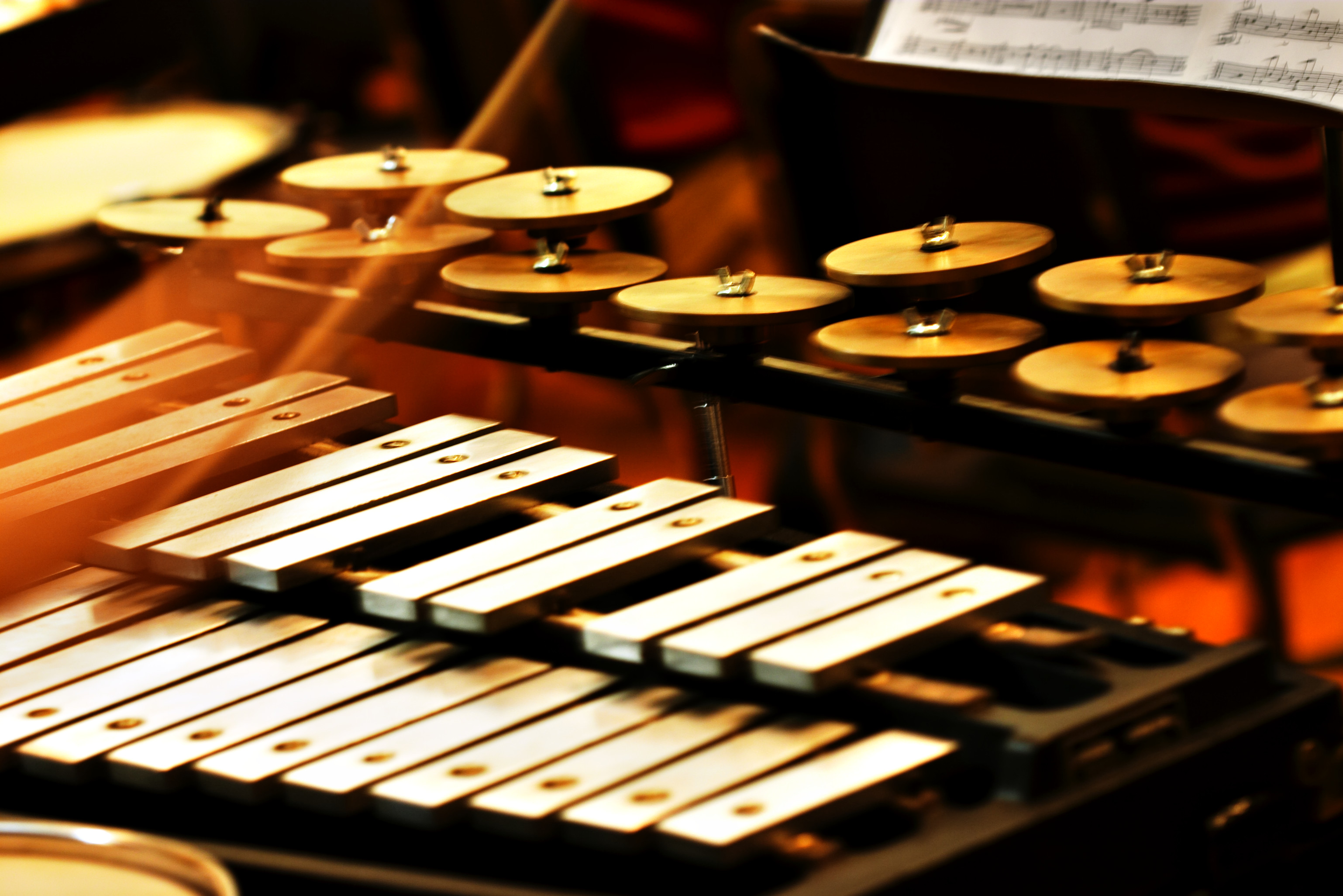
Glockenspiel and Crotales

A keyboard percussion instrument, also known as a bar or mallet percussion instrument, is a pitched percussion instrument arranged in the same pattern as a piano keyboard and most often played using mallets. While most keyboard percussion instruments are fully chromatic, keyboard instruments for children, such as ones used in the Orff Schulwerk, may be diatonic or pentatonic.

Despite the name, keyboard instruments such as the celesta and keyboard glockenspiel are not considered keyboard percussion instruments, despite being idiophones, due to the different skillsets required to play them. This is because keyboard percussion instruments do not possess actual keyboards, but simply follow the arrangement of the keyboard.

Common keyboard percussion instruments include marimba, xylophone, crotales, vibraphone, glockenspiel, and tubular bells.

== See also ==
- Classification of percussion instruments
- List of keyboard percussion manufacturers
