= Skrabalai =

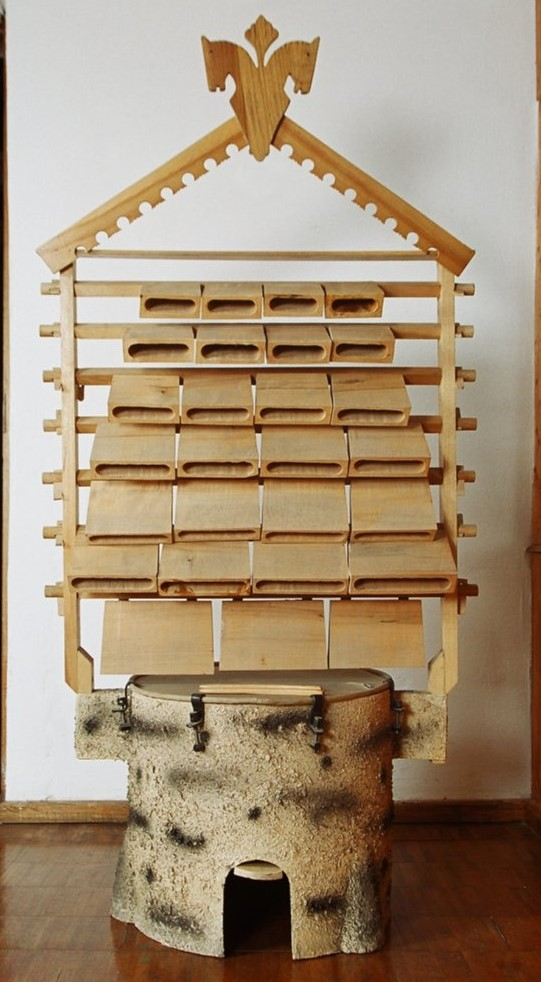
Skrabalai mounted on the kelmas drum

The skrabalai (Lithuanian: skrabalas, singular) is a Lithuanian idiophone. In its traditional form, it is a wooden or metal bell hung from the neck of grazing cattle and sounded by herdsmen. Since the mid-20th century, the name has additionally denoted a tuned percussion instrument built for Lithuanian folk orchestras that consists of wooden troughs mounted in vertical rows on a frame and struck with two sticks.

== Construction ==
A traditional skrabalas is a trapezoidal wooden box, a metal trough of cylindrical or conical form, or a rectangular plate, fitted with one to three clappers inside. Wooden examples were carved with ornament, the initials of the animal's owner and the year of manufacture, punched into metal examples instead, and pierced with one to three sound holes. The pitch depends on the size of the trough.

== Traditional use ==
Skrabalai were tied beneath the necks of grazing cattle from early times until the 20th century. They were also shepherds' instruments, used alongside the kleketas and terkšlė to drive animals, scare birds and for games. Musicians sometimes shook wooden skrabalai by hand, a practice revived by folklore ensembles in the second half of the 20th century. Clapperless examples were also struck with two sticks in village bands (kapelos), mounted on a pole driven into the ground until the first half of the 20th century and on a drum thereafter.

== Orchestral instrument ==
In 1947, P. Serva, to a design by J. Švedas, produced a modified nine-box instrument with a range of d^{1}–d^{2}, coupled to a pedal-operated drum known as the kelmas. Lithuanian folk-instrument ensembles use a variant of the instrument with 27 boxes fixed to seven crossbars and scaled to c^{1}, d^{1}, e^{1}, f^{1}–e^{3}.

== See also ==
- Kanklės
- Music of Lithuania
