= Octoban =

Type of tom-tom

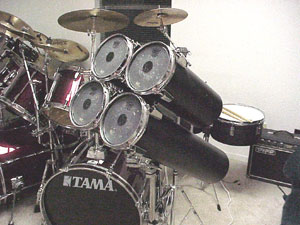
A cluster of four homemade octobans.

Octobans, also known as tube toms, are deep, small diameter, single-head tom-toms. Octobans were originally grouped in melodically tuned sets of eight, hence the name, in reference to octave and from octo meaning "eight".

Part sets of two or four drums or an individual drum or octo are common additions to a drum kit.

Complete and half sets of octobans are commonly mounted in clusters of four, in a square pattern. Mounts for four drums in a straight line, dual mounts for two drums, and individual mounts are all also reasonably common.

== History ==
Octobans were introduced by Tama Drums in 1978, and endorsed by Billy Cobham, at that time one of the most popular drummers who had switched to Tama drums. Tama octobans were made with fiberglass using a patented molding process. The naked shells were then painted in black lacquer (the raw color is something close to light brown, visible inside the shell where not completely painted). Since they were designed as rack toms, the attachment was different from that used on regular tom toms—basically the same one used for concert toms. The rims were shaped to expose the maximum possible head area to the stick, since a 6" diameter is not easy to hit reliably. The lugs (4) were the same model used for the Swingstar series drum kits of the same period. The shell was 6" across (150 mm outside diameter), and the thickness was 5 mm, though the very first series may have been 4 mm as advertised. A variation was produced in the late 1970s using plexiglass instead of fiberglass for the shell construction; The plexiglas was considerably more fragile. During the 1978-1984 period, Tama offered the complete 8-piece set or two sub-sets of four pieces each, low pitch (i.e. longest) and high pitch. Some famous drummers used the low pitch set, for example Stewart Copeland throughout the Police period. The dimensions of the low-pitch set of shells were the following (length mm, edge to edge): 810, 733, 667, 607. The high pitch set was dimensioned as follows: 552, 498, 455, 411 mm. All had a 6-inch diameter. In 1985 Tama modified the octobans by reducing the length of the shells. The low-pitch-only set was discontinued because they had proved difficult to transport on stage. The lengths available in 2023 are the following: 600, 536, 472, 443, 390, 343, 301, 280 (mm). The lug design has been modified from the original, and though the batter skin is still clear it no longer has the black dot. The different lengths of the cylinders give each drum its distinct tone.

The term octoban has since become a generic trademark used to refer to such sets of narrow-diameter tube drums.

=== Other makers ===
6" diameter:

• Premier Artist Octobans

- Pearl Rocket Tom.
- Drum Workshop Rata Tom.
- ddrum Deccabon.

Other diameters:

- Meinl Percussion Attack Timbales, 8" diameter.

Octoban drum shells from other manufacturers are of varying lengths, and made from materials like fiberglass, acrylic, aluminum, and wood. Some people build their own octobans out of PVC or similar commercial tubing.

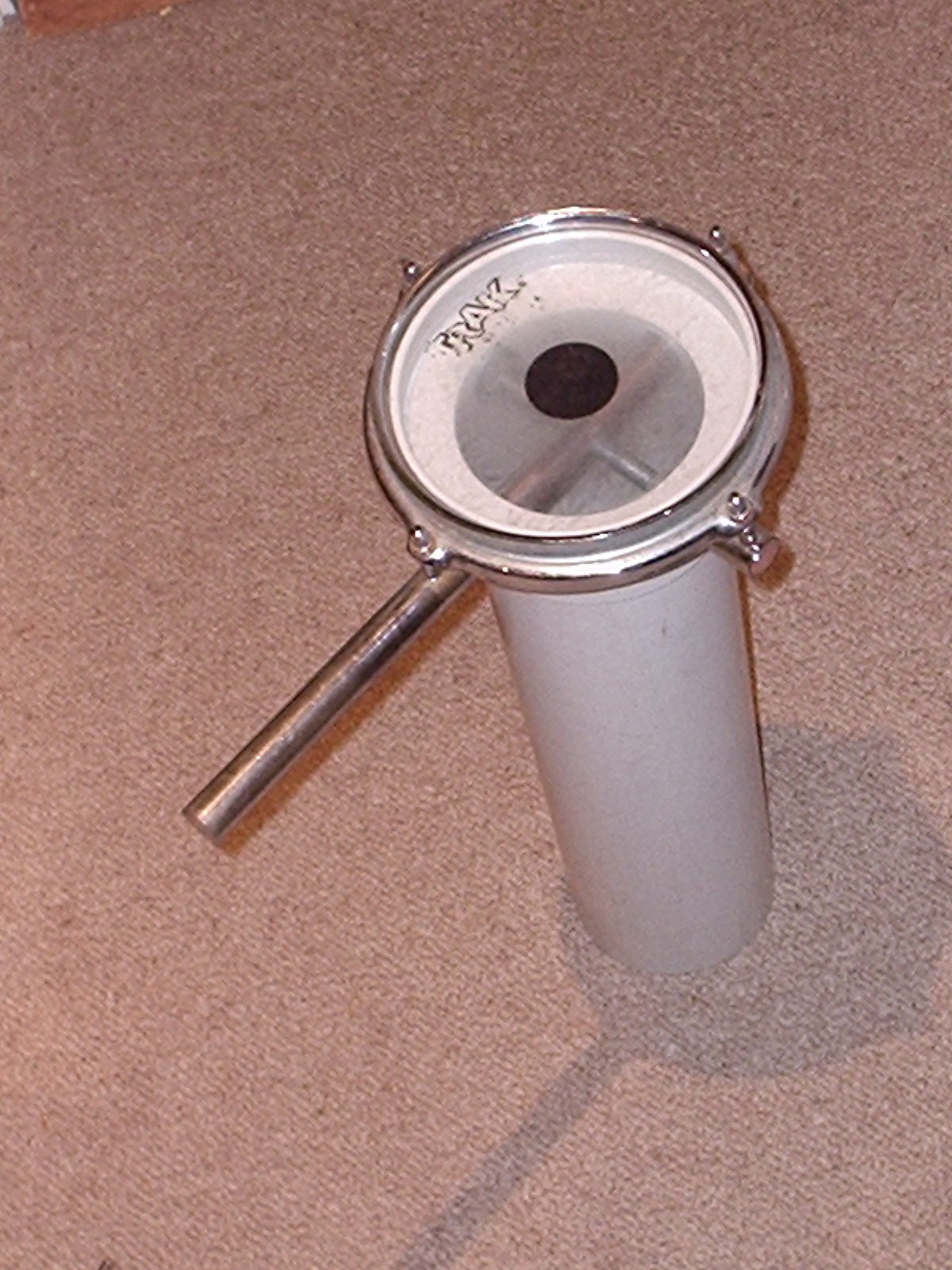
A single home made octoban

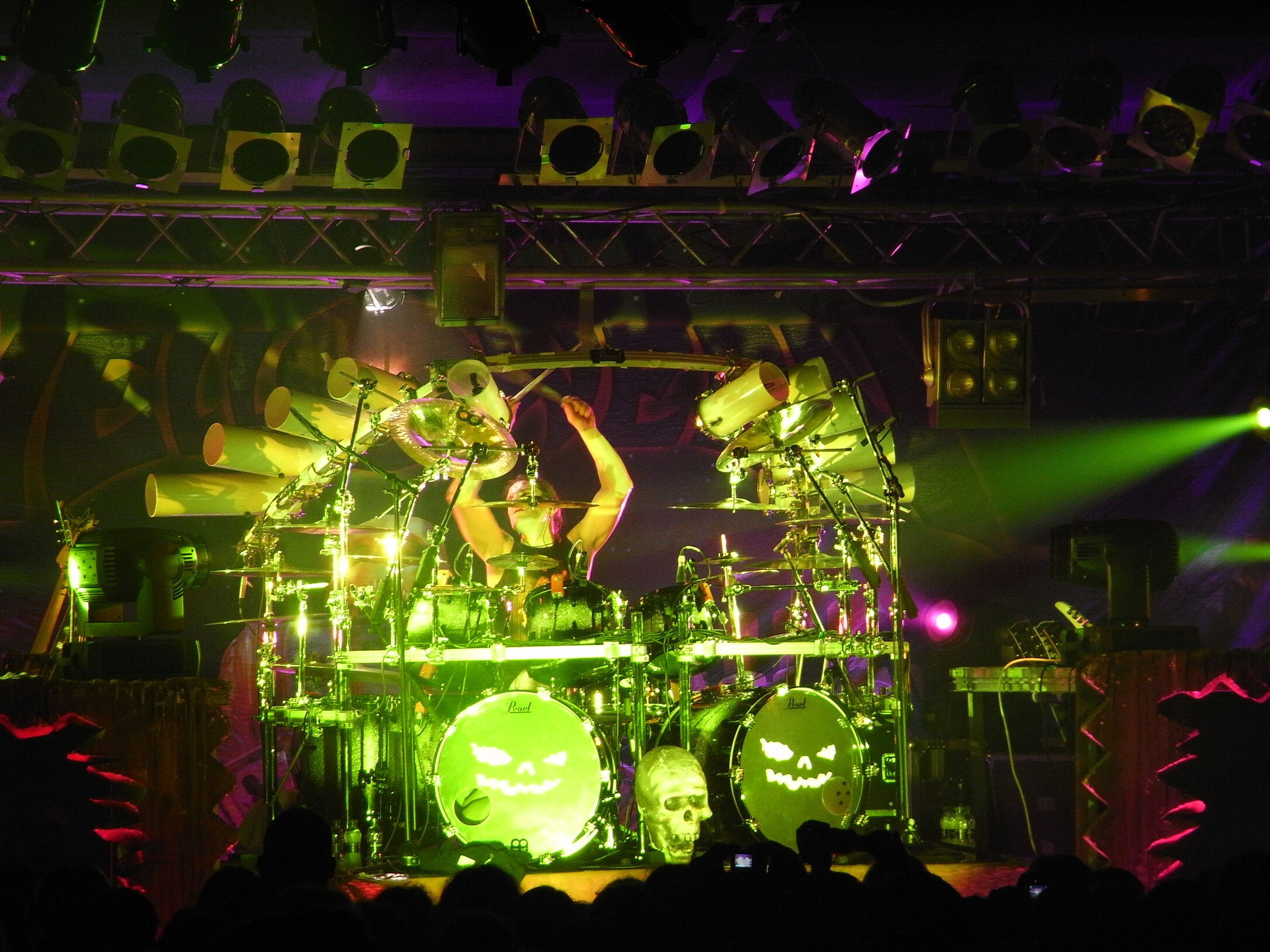
Daniel Löble with 10 Pearl Quarter Toms

== Notable octoban users ==
- Tim Alexander
- Blue Man Group
- Bill Bruford
- Mark Brzezicki
- Clive Burr
- Danny Carey
- Randy Castillo
- Jimmy Chamberlin
- Billy Cobham
- Stewart Copeland
- Mick Fleetwood
- Hannes Grossmann
- Mickey Hart
- Steve Jansen
- Joey Jordison
- Dave Lombardo
- Dave Mackintosh
- Mike Mangini
- Anders Johansson
- Nick Mason
- Roy Mayorga
- Joe Nanini
- Jose Pasillas
- Simon Phillips
- Mike Portnoy
- Rikki Rockett
- Shinya
- Sivamani
- Chad Smith
- Roger Taylor
- Alex Van Halen
- Brooks Wackerman
- Gary Wallis
- Bill Ward
Some users of Tama Octobans
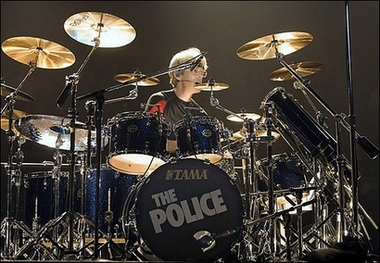
Stewart Copeland

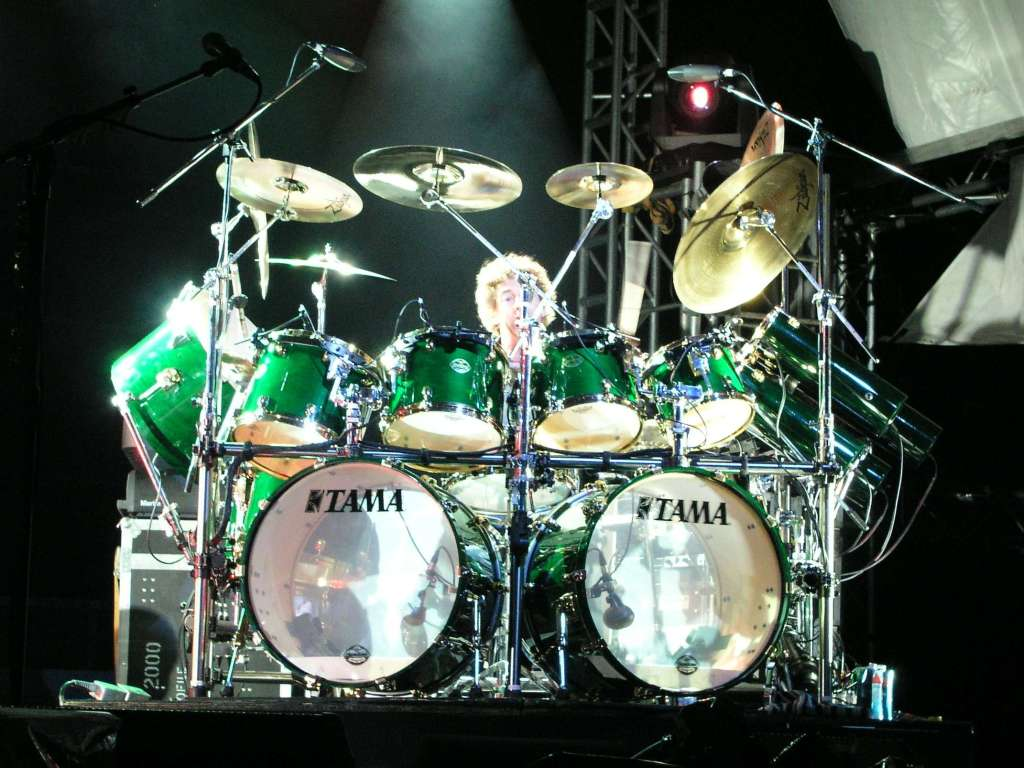
Simon Phillips

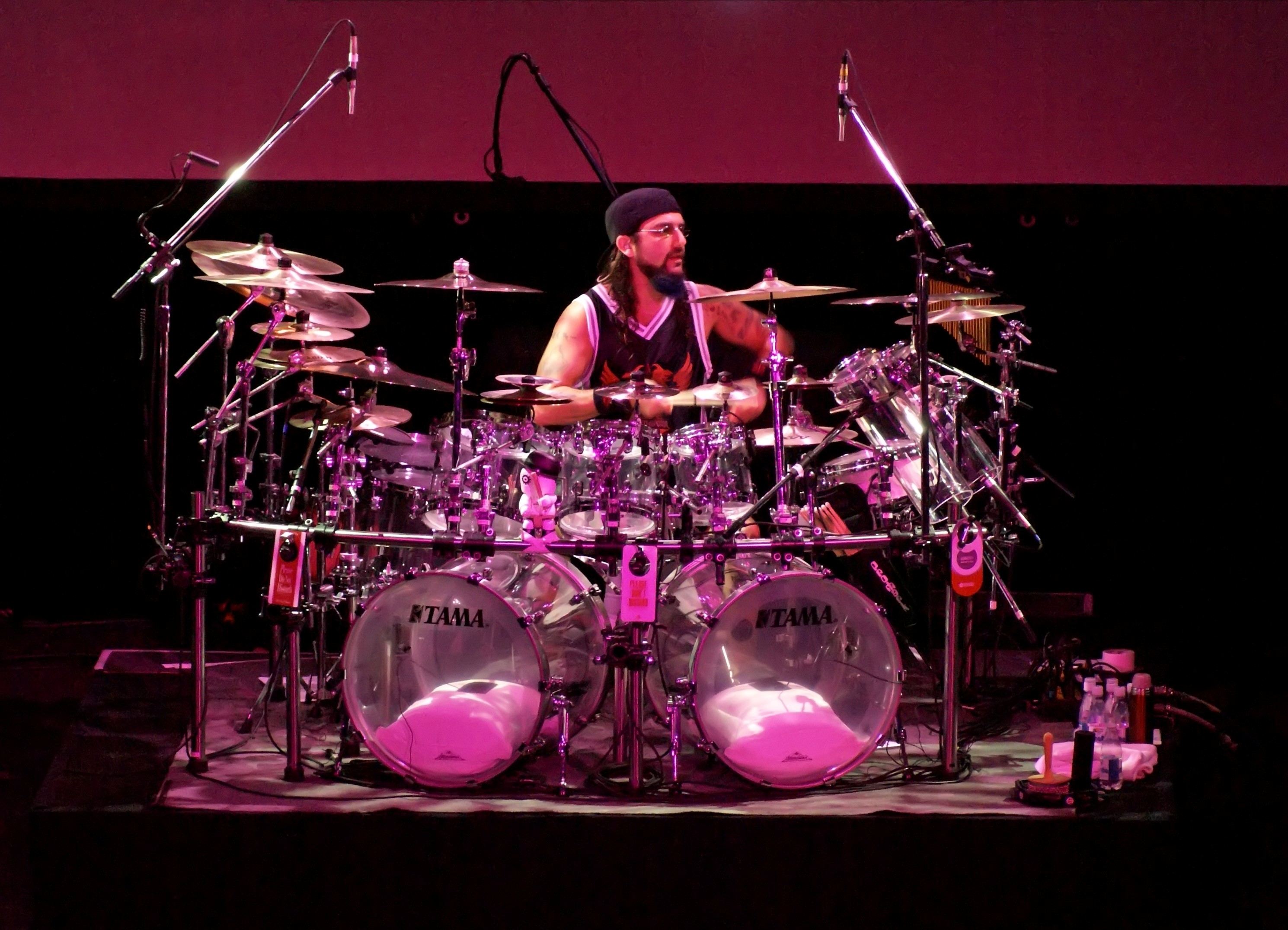
Mike Portnoy
