= Percussion instrument =

Type of musical instrument that produces a sound by being hit

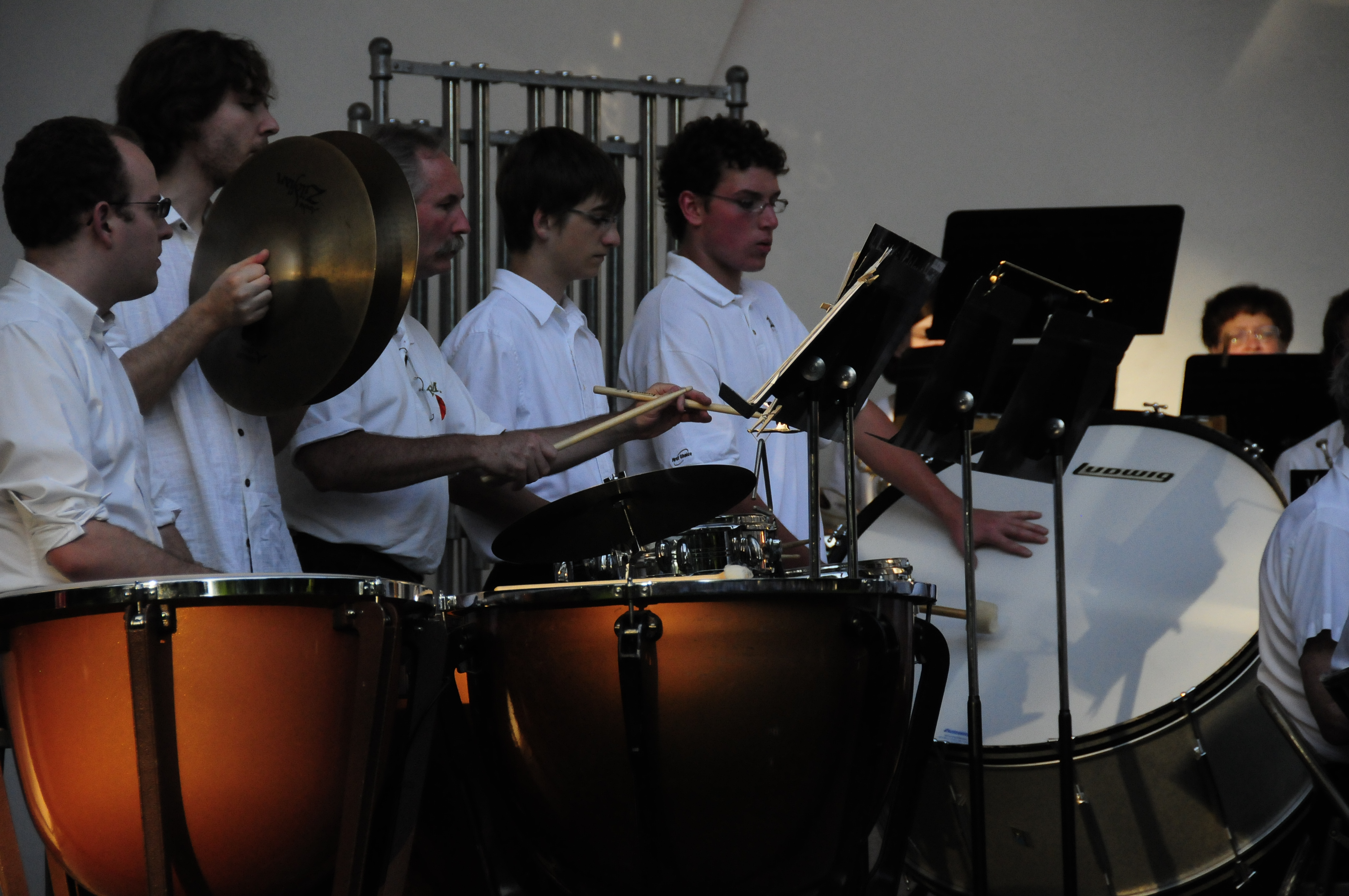
Orchestral percussion section with timpani, unpitched auxiliary percussion and pitched tubular bells

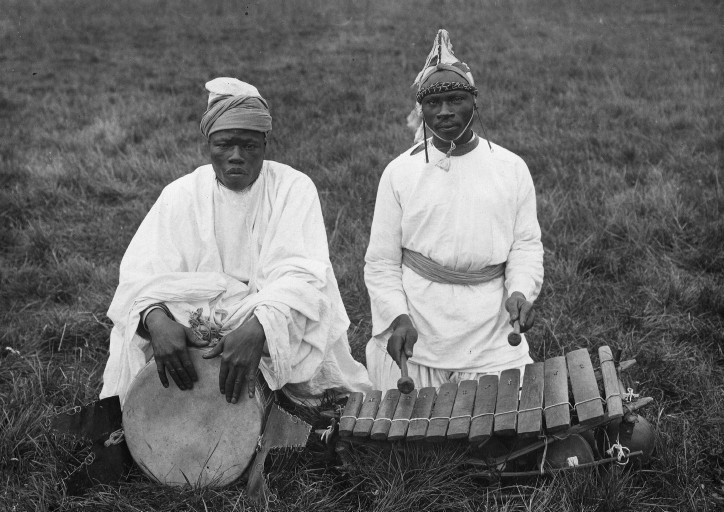
Djembé and balafon played by Susu people of Guinea

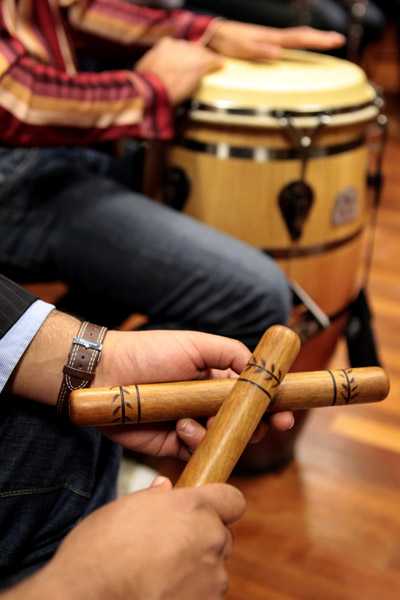
Concussion idiophones (claves), and struck drums (conga drum)

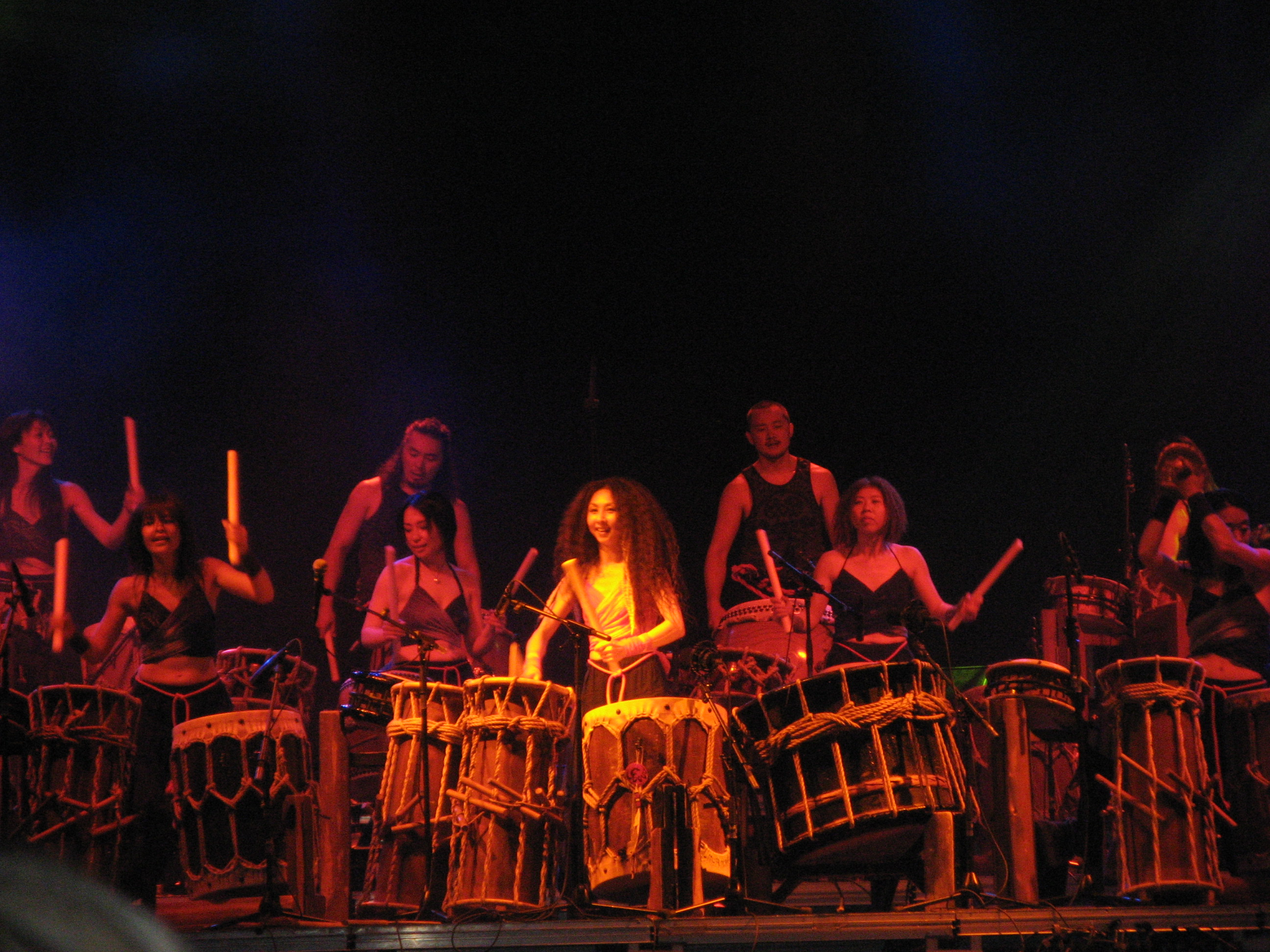
Modern Japanese taiko percussion ensemble

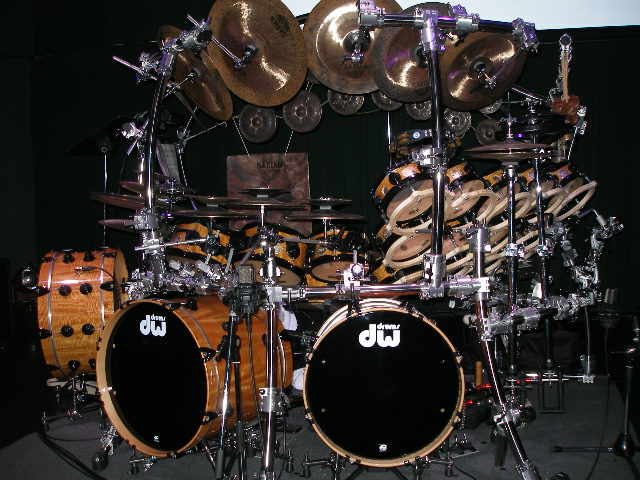
Very large drum kit played by Terry Bozzio

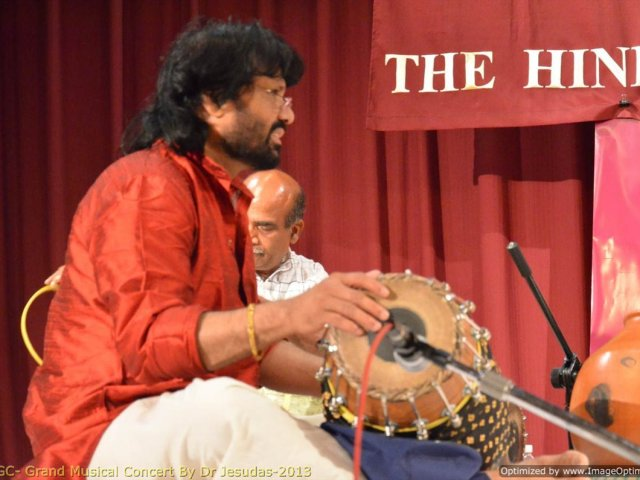
Mridangam, an Indian percussion instrument, played by T. S. Nandakumar

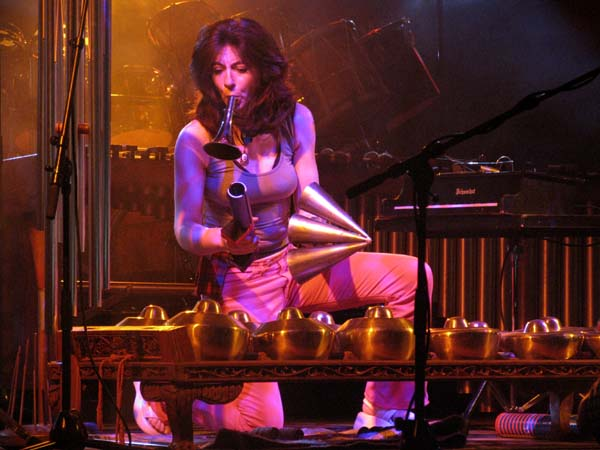
Evelyn Glennie is a percussion soloist

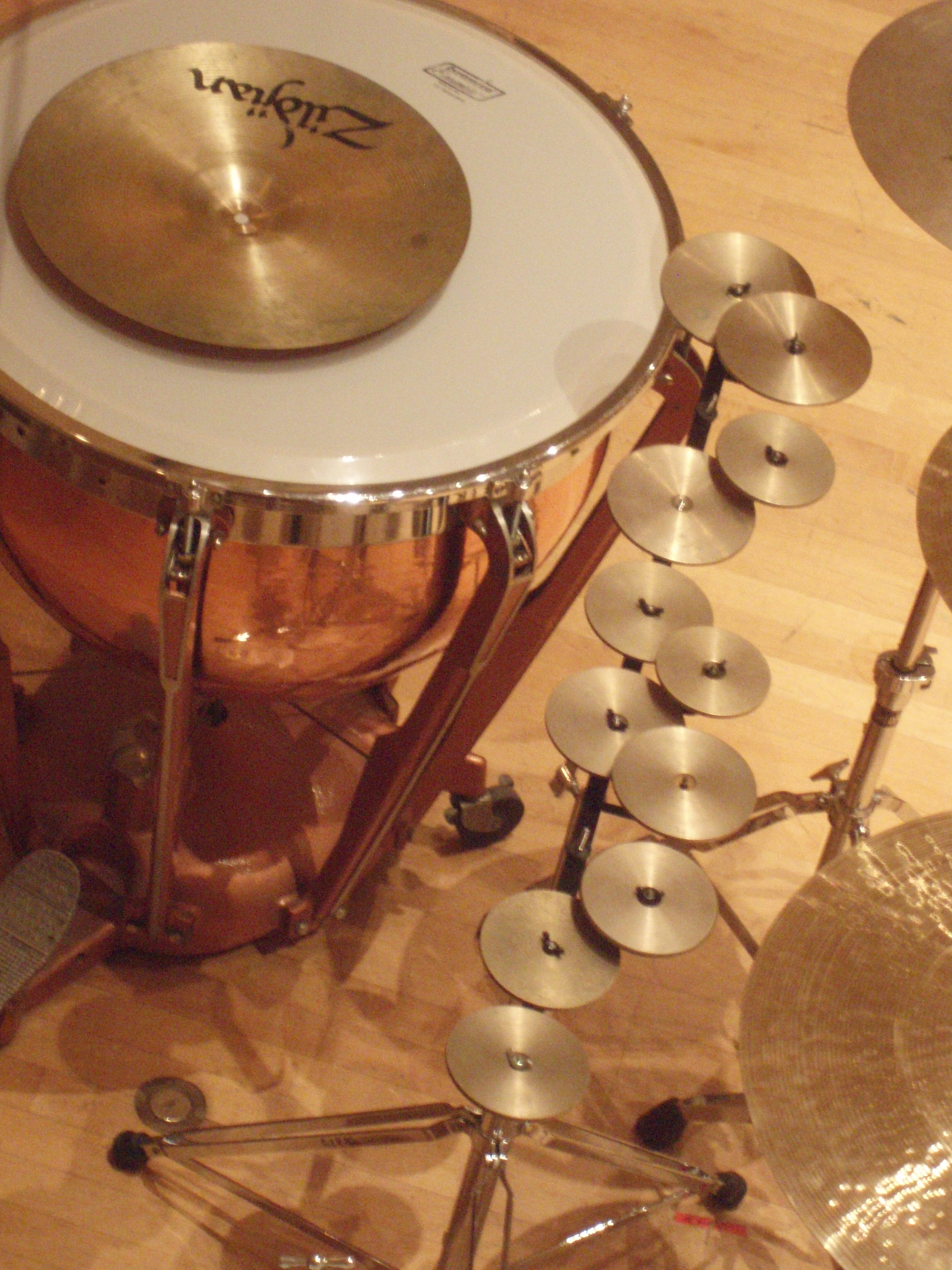
Timpani, cymbal, and a set of orchestral crotales

A percussion instrument is a musical instrument that is sounded by being struck or scraped by a beater including attached or enclosed beaters or rattles struck, scraped or rubbed by hand or struck against another similar instrument. Excluding zoomusicological instruments and the human voice, the percussion family is believed to include the oldest musical instruments. In spite of being a very common term to designate instruments, and to relate them to their players, the percussionists, percussion is not a systematic classificatory category of instruments, as described by the scientific field of organology. It is shown below that percussion instruments may belong to the organological classes of idiophone, membranophone, aerophone and chordophone.

The percussion section of an orchestra most commonly contains instruments such as the timpani, snare drum, bass drum, tambourine, belonging to the membranophones, and cymbals and triangle, which are idiophones. However, the section can also contain aerophones, such as whistles and sirens, or a blown conch shell. Percussive techniques can even be applied to the human body itself, as in body percussion. On the other hand, keyboard instruments, such as the celesta, are not normally part of the percussion section, but keyboard percussion instruments such as the glockenspiel and xylophone (which do not have piano keyboards) are included.

== Function ==
Percussion instruments may play not only rhythm, but also melody and harmony.

Percussion is commonly referred to as "the backbone" or "the heartbeat" of a musical ensemble, often working in close collaboration with bass instruments, when present. In jazz and other popular music ensembles, the pianist, bassist, drummer and sometimes the guitarist are referred to as the rhythm section. Most classical pieces written for full orchestra since the time of Haydn and Mozart are orchestrated to place emphasis on the strings, woodwinds, and brass. However, often at least one pair of timpani is included, though they rarely play continuously. Rather, they serve to provide additional accents when needed. In the 18th and 19th centuries, other percussion instruments (like the triangle or cymbals) have been used, again generally sparingly. The use of percussion instruments became more frequent in the 20th century classical music.

In almost every style of music, percussion plays a pivotal role. In military marching bands and pipes and drums, it is the beat of the bass drum that keeps the soldiers in step and at a regular speed, and it is the snare that provides that crisp, decisive air to the tune of a regiment. In classic jazz, one almost immediately thinks of the distinctive rhythm of the hi-hats or the ride cymbal when the word-swing is spoken. In more recent popular-music culture, it is almost impossible to name three or four rock, hip-hop, rap, funk or even soul charts or songs that do not have some sort of percussive beat keeping the tune in time.

Because of the diversity of percussive instruments, it is not uncommon to find large musical ensembles composed entirely of percussion. Rhythm, melody, and harmony are all represented in these ensembles.

== Percussion notation ==
Music for pitched percussion instruments can be notated on a staff with the same treble and bass clefs used by many non-percussive instruments. Music for percussive instruments without a definite pitch can be notated with a specialist rhythm or percussion-clef. The guitar also has a special "tab" staff. More often a bass clef is substituted for rhythm clef.

== Classification ==
Percussion instruments are classified by various criteria sometimes depending on their construction, ethnic origin, function within musical theory and orchestration, or their relative prevalence in common knowledge.

The word percussion derives from the Latin verb percussio to beat, strike in the musical sense, and the noun percussus, a beating. As a noun in contemporary English, Wiktionary describes it as the collision of two bodies to produce a sound. The term is not unique to music, but has application in medicine and weaponry, as in percussion cap. However, all known uses of percussion appear to share a similar lineage beginning with the original Latin percussus. In a musical context then, the percussion instruments may have been originally coined to describe a family of musical instruments including drums, rattles, metal plates, or blocks that musicians beat or struck to produce sound.

The Hornbostel–Sachs system has no high-level section for percussion. Most percussion instruments as the term is normally understood are classified as idiophones and membranophones. However the term percussion is instead used at lower-levels of the Hornbostel–Sachs hierarchy, including to identify instruments struck with either a non sonorous object hand, stick, striker or against a non-sonorous object human body, the ground. This is opposed to concussion, which refers to instruments with two or more complementary sonorous parts that strike against each other and other meanings. For example:

111.1 Concussion idiophones or clappers, played in pairs and beaten against each other, such as zills and clapsticks.

111.2 Percussion idiophones, includes many percussion instruments played with the hand or by a percussion mallet, such as the hang, gongs and the xylophone, but not drums and only some cymbals.

21 Struck drums, includes most types of drum, such as the timpani, snare drum, and tom-tom.

412.12 Percussion reeds, a class of wind instrument unrelated to percussion in the more common sense

There are many instruments that have some claim to being percussion, but are classified otherwise:

- Keyboard instruments such as the celesta and piano.^{[a]}
- Stringed instruments played with beaters such as the hammered dulcimer.
- Unpitched whistles and similar instruments, such as the pea whistle and Acme siren.

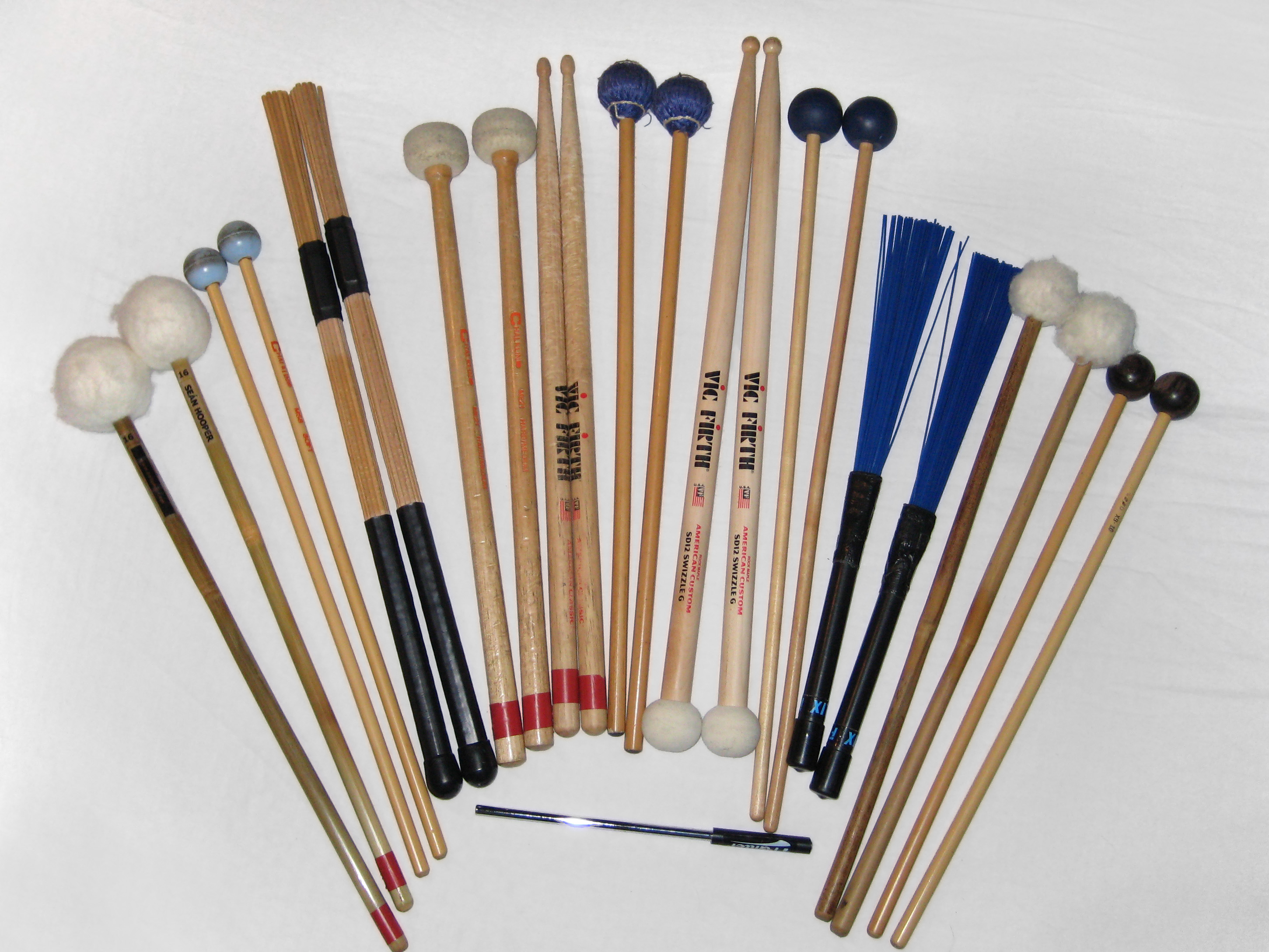
Percussion mallets and sticks

Percussion instruments are sometimes classified as pitched or unpitched. While valid, this classification is widely seen as inadequate. Rather, it may be more informative to describe percussion instruments in regards to one or more of the following four paradigms:

=== By methods of sound production ===
Many texts, including Teaching Percussion by Gary Cook of the University of Arizona, begin by studying the physical characteristics of instruments and the methods by which they can produce sound. This is perhaps the most scientifically pleasing assignment of nomenclature whereas the other paradigms are more dependent on historical or social circumstances. Based on observation and experimentation, one can determine how an instrument produces sound and then assign the instrument to one of the following four categories:

==== Idiophone ====
"Idiophones produce sounds through the vibration of their entire body." Examples of idiophones:

- Bells
- Bock-a-da-bock
- Cabasa
- Cajón
- Castanets
- Celesta
- Chimes
- Claves
- Cowbell
- Crash cymbals
- Crotales
- Daxophone
- Flexatone
- Glockenspiel
- Güiro
- Handbells
- Hi-hat
- Lummi stick
- Maraca
- Marimba
- Orchestra bells
- Quadrangularis Reversum
- Ratchet
- Singing bowls
- Slit drum
- Steelpan
- Suspended cymbal
- Temple blocks
- Thumb piano (or Kalimba)
- Triangle
- Txalaparta
- Vibraphone
- Vibraslap
- Wood block
- Washboard
- Xylophone

==== Membranophone ====
Most objects commonly known as drums are membranophones. Membranophones produce sound primarily by way of a vibrating stretched membrane when they are struck with a hand, mallet, stick, beater, or improvised tool.

Examples of membranophones:

- Bass drum
- Bongos
- Conga
- Darbuka
- Djembe
- Kuzeh
- Mridangam
- Octoban
- Parai
- Rototom
- Snare drum
- Tabla
- Thavil
- Timpani
- Tom-tom
- Lion's roar
- Urumi
- Wind machine

==== Chordophone ====
Most instruments known as chordophones are defined as string instruments, wherein their sound is derived from the vibration of a string, but some such as these examples also fall under percussion instruments.

- Hammered dulcimer, Cimbalom
- Onavillu
- Piano
- Berimbau
- Jhallari
- Kolitong
- Takumbo

==== Aerophone ====
Most instruments known as aerophones are defined as wind instruments whereby sound is produced by a stream of air being blown through the object. However, plosive aerophones, such as the udu, are percussion instruments and may also overlap with the idiophone family. In certain situations, such as in an orchestra or wind ensemble, wind instruments, such as the Acme siren or various whistles, are played by percussionists, owing to their unconventional and simple nature.

- Apito or samba whistle
- Siren
- Slide whistle
- Udu
- Whistle or police whistle

=== By musical function or orchestration ===
When classifying instruments by function it is useful to note if a percussion instrument makes a definite pitch or indefinite pitch.

For example, some percussion instruments such as the marimba and timpani produce an obvious fundamental pitch and can therefore play melody and serve harmonic functions in music. Other instruments such as crash cymbals and snare drums produce sounds with such complex overtones and a wide range of prominent frequencies that no pitch is discernible.

==== Definite pitch ====
Percussion instruments in this group are sometimes referred to as pitched or tuned.

Examples of percussion instruments with definite pitch:

- Aluphone
- Chimes/Tubular bells
- Crotales
- Glass harmonica
- Glass harp
- Glockenspiel
- Handbells
- Marimba
- Mridangam
- Rototom
- Steelpan
- Tabla
- Timpani
- Tuned Triangle
- Vibraphone
- Wind chimes
- Xylophone
- Xylo-marimba

==== Indefinite pitch ====
Instruments in this group are sometimes referred to as non-pitched, unpitched, or untuned. Traditionally these instruments are thought of as making a sound that contains such complex frequencies that no discernible pitch can be heard.

In fact many traditionally unpitched instruments, such as triangles and even cymbals, have also been produced as tuned sets.

Examples of percussion instruments with indefinite pitch:

- Bass drum
- Castanets
- Cymbals
- Rainstick
- Slapstick or whip
- Snare drum
- Tamtam
- Tom-tom

=== By prevalence in common knowledge ===
It is difficult to define what is common knowledge but there are instruments percussionists and composers use in contemporary music that most people would not consider musical instruments. It is worthwhile to try to distinguish between instruments based on their acceptance or consideration by a general audience.

For example, most people would not consider an anvil, a brake drum (on a vehicle with drum brakes, the circular hub the brake shoes press against), or a fifty-five gallon oil barrel musical instruments yet composers and percussionists use these objects.

Percussion instruments generally fall into the following categories:

==== Conventional or popular ====
- Drum kit
- Gong (tamtam)
- Tambourine
- Triangle

==== Unconventional ====
- Anvils
- Automobile brake drum
- Beer kegs
- Brooms
- Clay pots
- Firearms or explosive charges
- Five gallon buckets
- Garbage cans
- Glass bottles
- Hammer
- Metal pipes
- Metal pots
- Plastic bottles
- Plastic bag
- Rocks in a bucket
- Shopping carts
- Spokes on a bicycle wheel
- Tableware

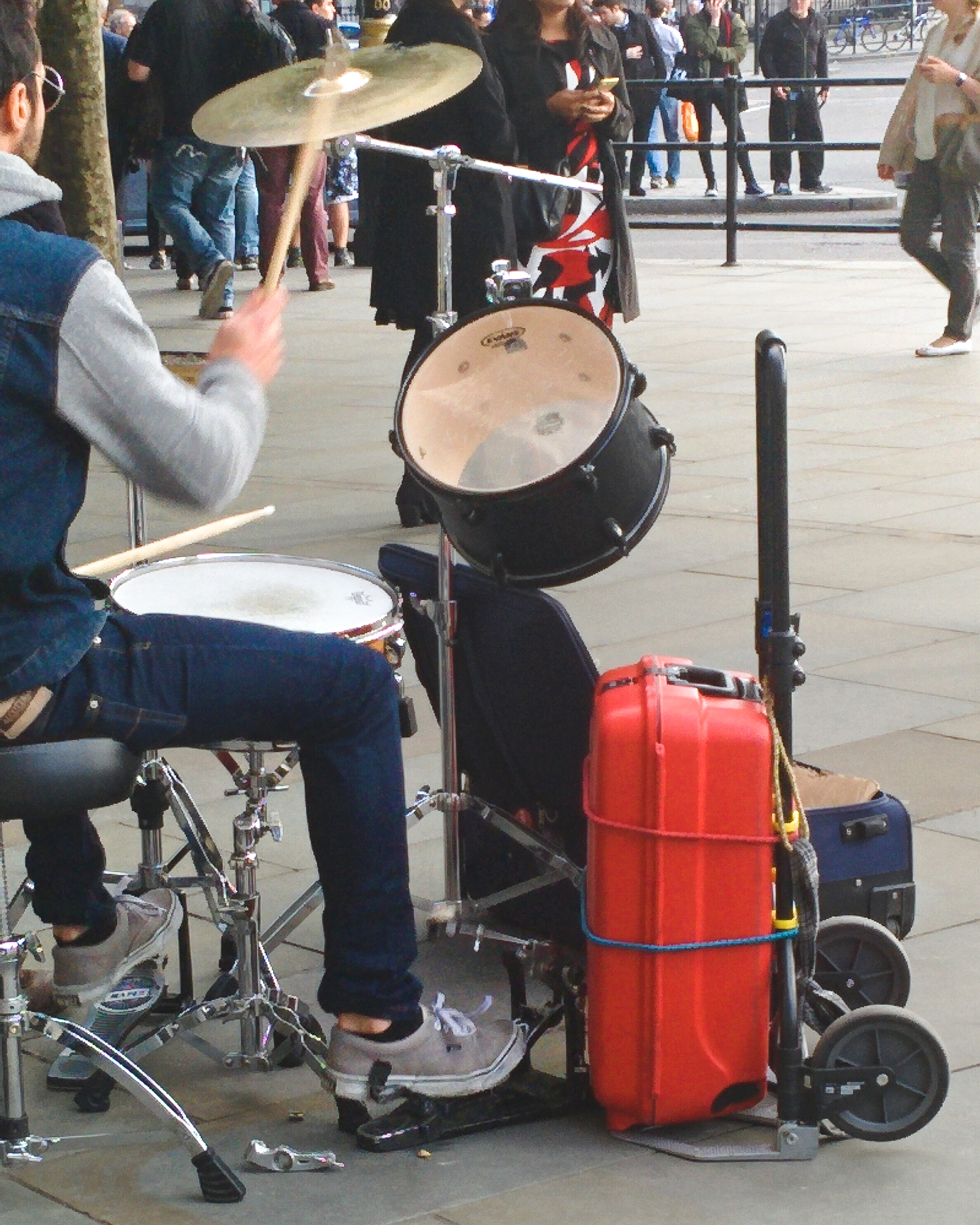
Improvised bass drum in Trafalgar Square, London.

One pre-20th century example of found percussion is the use of cannon usually loaded with blank charges in Tchaikovsky's 1812 Overture. John Cage, Harry Partch, Edgard Varèse, and Peter Schickele, all noted composers, created entire pieces of music using unconventional instruments. Beginning in the early 20th century perhaps with Ionisation by Edgard Varèse which used air-raid sirens among other things, composers began to require that percussionists invent or find objects to produce desired sounds and textures. Another example the use of a hammer and saw in Penderecki's De Natura Sonoris No. 2. By the late 20th century, such instruments were common in modern percussion ensemble music and popular productions, such as the off-Broadway show, Stomp. Rock band Aerosmith used a number of unconventional instruments in their song Sweet Emotion, including shotguns, brooms, and a sugar bag. The metal band Slipknot is well known for playing unusual percussion items, having two percussionists in the band. Along with deep sounding drums, their sound includes hitting baseball bats and other objects on beer kegs to create a distinctive sound.

=== By cultural significance or tradition ===
It is not uncommon to discuss percussion instruments in relation to their cultural origin. This led to a division between instruments considered common or modern, and folk instruments with significant history or purpose within a geographic region or culture.

==== Folk percussion instruments ====
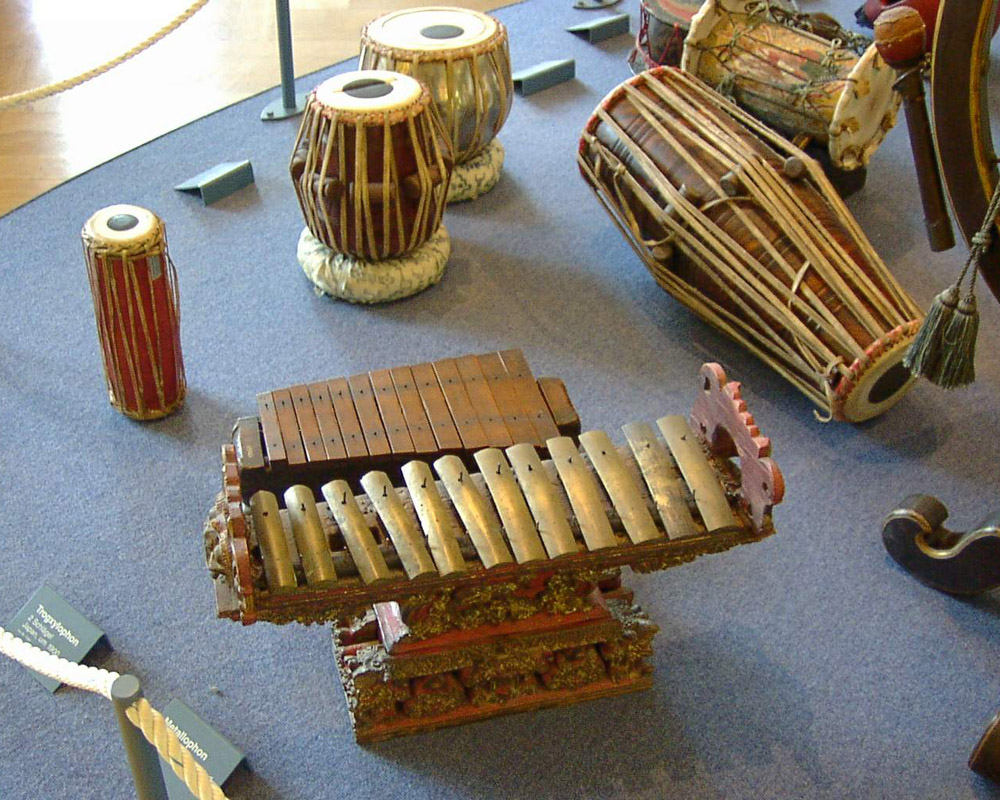
Some percussion instruments

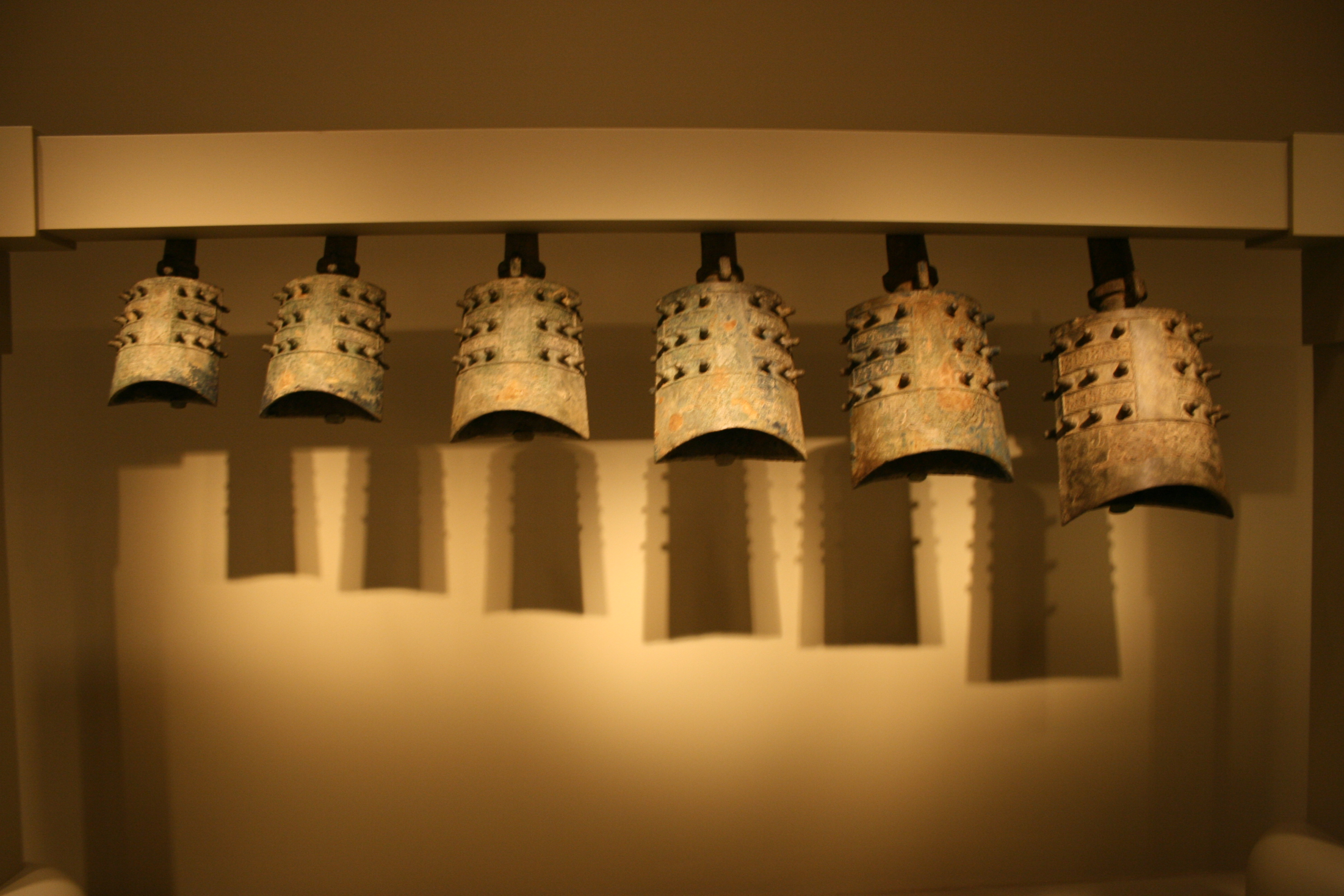
Ancient Chinese musical bronze bells from the Eastern Zhou dynasty, c. 6th century BC.

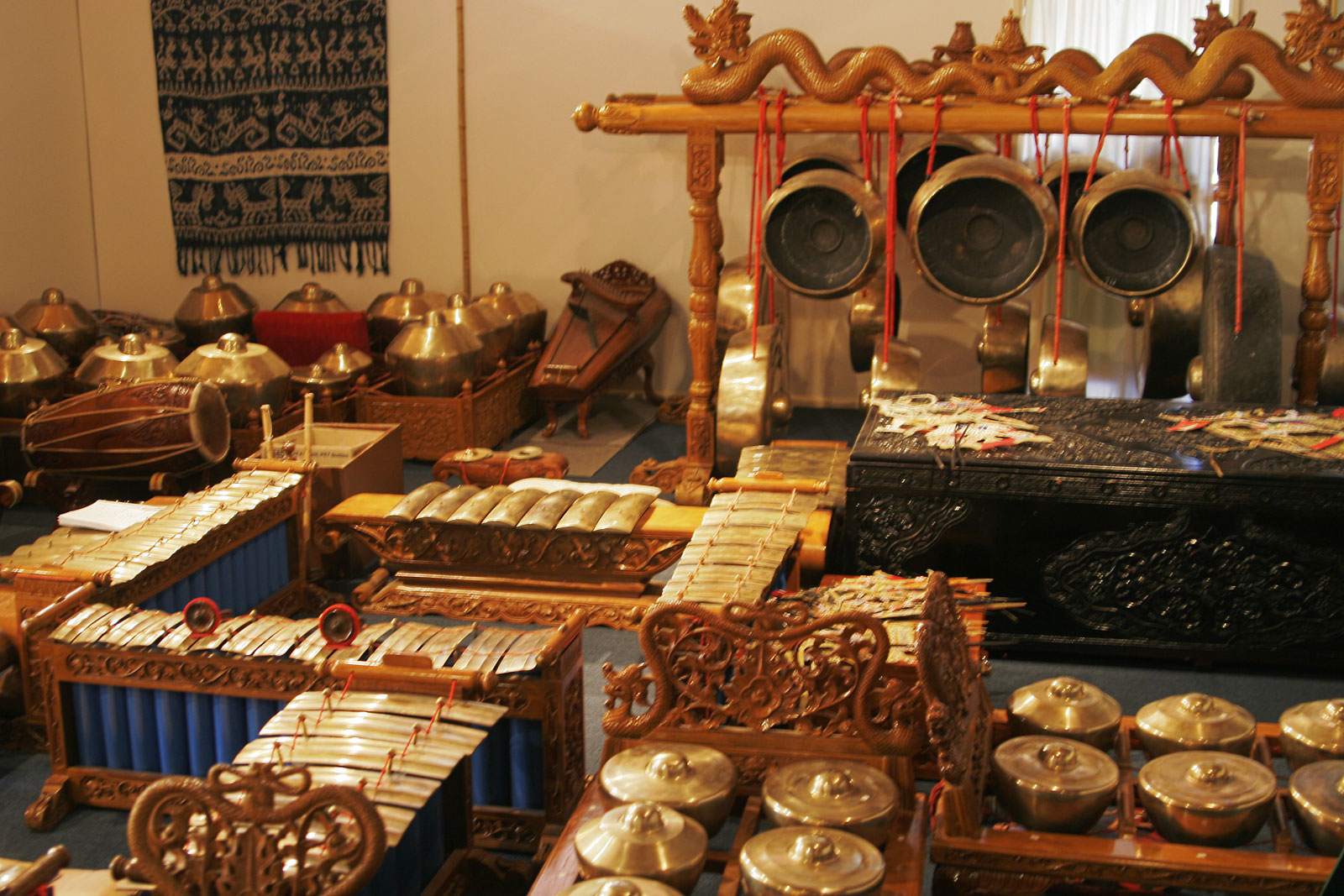
A traditional Indonesian gamelan orchestra, composed almost entirely of percussion instruments

- Berimbau
- Bodhrán
- Bombo legüero
- Bongo drum
- Cajon
- Conga
- Dhaa
- Dhime
- Dhol
- Dholak
- Djembe
- Dunun
- Gamelan
- Ghatam
- Kalimba (Thumb Piano)
- Kpanlogo
- Lagerphone
- Latin percussion
- Madal
- Marimba
- Marimbula
- Naykheen
- Pogo cello
- Skrabalai
- Spoons
- Steelpan
- Tabla
- Taiko
- Tambourine
- Thavil
- Timbales
- Tonbak
- Urumee
- Udukai

==== "Common" drums ====
This category includes instruments that are widely available and popular throughout the world:

- Drum kit, typically consisting of:
  - Bass drum
  - Crash cymbal
  - Ride cymbal
  - Floor tom
  - Hi-Hat cymbals
  - Snare drum
  - Tom-tom drums
- Marching percussion instruments
- Orchestral percussion instruments

=== By capability of melodic production ===
- Non-melodic percussion: bongos, snare drum, etc.
- Melodic percussion: glass marimba, gendér, etc.

=== By percussive beater ===
The percussionist uses various objects to strike a percussion instrument to produce sound.

- Hands: hand drums, body percussion
- Sticks: drum kit
- Mallets: mallet percussion, timpani
- Auxiliary: triangle, cymbals
- Feet: Step dance, Tap dance

== Names for percussionists ==
The general term for a musician who plays percussion instruments is "percussionist" but the terms listed below often describe specialties:

- Balafonist: a balafon player.
- Bombisto: a bombo legüero player.
- Bongocero: someone who plays bongos and usually cencerro (a cow bell).
- Congalero, conguero: someone who plays congas.
- Cymbalist: someone who plays cymbals.
- Djembefola: djembe player.
- Drummer: someone who plays the drumset, hand drums or a single drum such as Snare drum.
- Dununfola: dunun player.
- Glockenspielist: someone who plays the glockenspiel.
- Güirero: someone who plays the güira, a Dominican scraper used in merengue music.
- Marimbist: a marimba player.
- Panman, pannist: a steelpan player.
- Timbalero, timbero: someone who plays timbales.
- Timpanist: a timpani player.
- Vibraphonist: a vibraphone player.
- Xylophonist: a xylophone player.

Within rock music, the term "percussionist" is often used to refer to someone who plays percussion instruments but is not primarily a drummer. The term is especially found in bands where one person plays drums and another plays other hit instruments.

== See also ==
- List of percussion instruments
- List of percussionists
- Lists of tuned and untuned percussion instruments
- Orchestral percussion
- Percussion notation
- Vocal percussion
- Rudimental percussion
- Percussion ensemble
