= Rattle =

Rattle may refer to:

== Instruments ==
- Crotalus (instrument), a liturgical percussion instrument
- Rattle (percussion instrument), a type of percussion instrument
- Rattle (percussion beater), a part of some percussion instruments
- Cog rattle, or ratchet, a percussion instrument
- Bird-scaring rattle, a Slovene device used to drive birds off vineyards and a folk instrument
- Toy rattle, a baby toy

== Music ==
- The Rattles, German rock band who recorded an upbeat version of "Zip-a-dee-doo-dah" in the 1960s also famous for their 1970 hit "The Witch"
- "Rattle" (song), a 2011 electro house song by Dutch duo Bingo Players
- "Rattle!", a 2020 song by American contemporary worship band Elevation Worship
- Rattle Records, a New Zealand contemporary art-music label.

== Places ==
- Rattle, Derbyshire, a hamlet in England
- Rattle Hill, a summit in Sullivan County, New York

== People ==
- Frederick Rattle (1869–1950), Australian politician
- Nick Levay a.k.a. Rattle (1977–2021), American computer security expert
- Simon Rattle (born 1955), English conductor

== Science ==
- Death rattle, gurgling sounds often produced by a person near death
- Rhinanthus, a genus of plants
- RATTLE, a constraint algorithm used in molecular dynamics simulations
- Rattle GUI a gui for the statistical programming language R

== Other ==
- Rattle (magazine), an American poetry journal

== See also ==
- Rattlesnake
- Rattle and Hum, a 1988 album by Irish rock band U2
