= Sanctus bell =

Sanctus bell or sacring bell may refer to:

- a particular type of church bell hung in a church tower or bell-cot
- small hand-held altar bell or bells
