= Tom drum =

Cylindrical drum

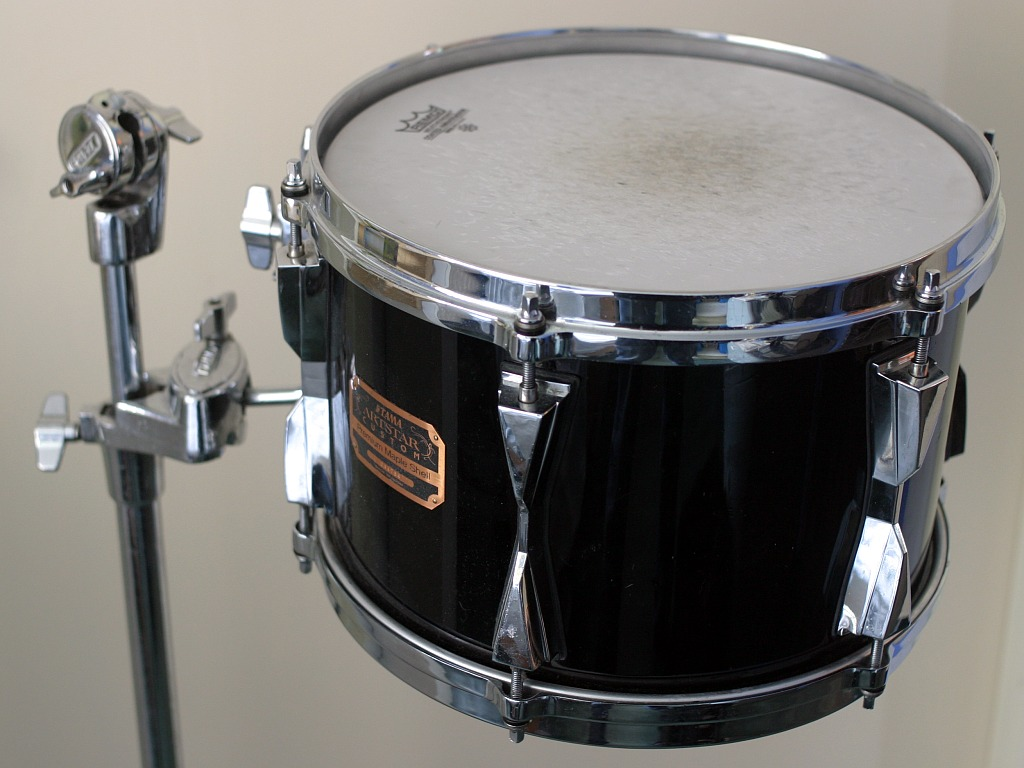
12 in × 8 in (30 cm × 20 cm) rack tom mounted to a stand

A tom drum (also known as a tom-tom) is a cylindrical drum with no snares, named from the Anglo-Indian and Sinhala language. It was added to the drum kit in the early part of the 20th century. Most toms range in size between 15 and 50 centimetres (6 and 20 inches) in diameter, though floor toms can go as large as 60 centimetres (24 inches).

== Design history ==
The drum called "Thammattama", played by the Sinhalese people of Sri Lanka, is used in a number of Buddhist rituals in that country. It is commonly heard in Theravada Buddhist temple Vihāras paired along with the reed instrument called horanava. This may be etymologically derived from the Tamil term "Thappattam" or "Thappu", a frame drum associated with South Indian Tamil culture. However, the tom-tom drums on the Western drum set clearly resemble the Sri Lankan version more than the frame drum.

The British colonists complained loudly about the noise generated by the "tom-toms" of the natives throughout South Asia. It is likely that the term tom-toms thus comes from their experiences in colonial Sri Lanka (then called Ceylon) or South India. The term "tom-tom" also has variants in the Telugu and Hindi languages, but only in Sri Lanka is there an indigenous drum with the same name (thammattama). Perhaps because of Westerners' lack of experience with Asian cultures, the term is often misattributed to the Chinese, given that "tam-tam" in Western classical music refers to a Chinese gong.

The first American drum set toms had no rims and were usually what were referred to as "Chinese" tom toms. The pigskin heads were tacked to the wooden shells with metal tacks. Through close collaboration with Gene Krupa's concept of fully tunable toms, the Slingerland drum and banjo company were the first, in 1936, to begin offering fully tunable tom-toms (top and bottom heads) with metal or wooden rims, tension rods, and lugs. Most Chinese toms were 10 to 14 inches in diameter, but the American drum companies were eventually producing a wider range of diameters and depths. These drums were usually clamped to the bass drum rims or sat in cradles as floor stand drums. The sizes that Krupa chose became the "standard" for many decades and they were 13 × 9″ (mounted) and 16 × 16″ (floor). Later, three (or, if larger than 16 × 16″, four) legs were attached to the floor tom designs. Together with a snare drum and a bass drum of varying size, the combination of the four drums became a "set". (The term "kit" did not appear until the mid 1960s.)

Later, the mounted toms, known as hanging toms or rack toms, were deepened by one inch each, these sizes being called power toms. Extra-deep hanging toms, known as cannon depth, never achieved popularity. All these were double-headed.

== Modern versions ==
A wide variety of configurations have been available and in use at all levels from advanced student kits upwards.

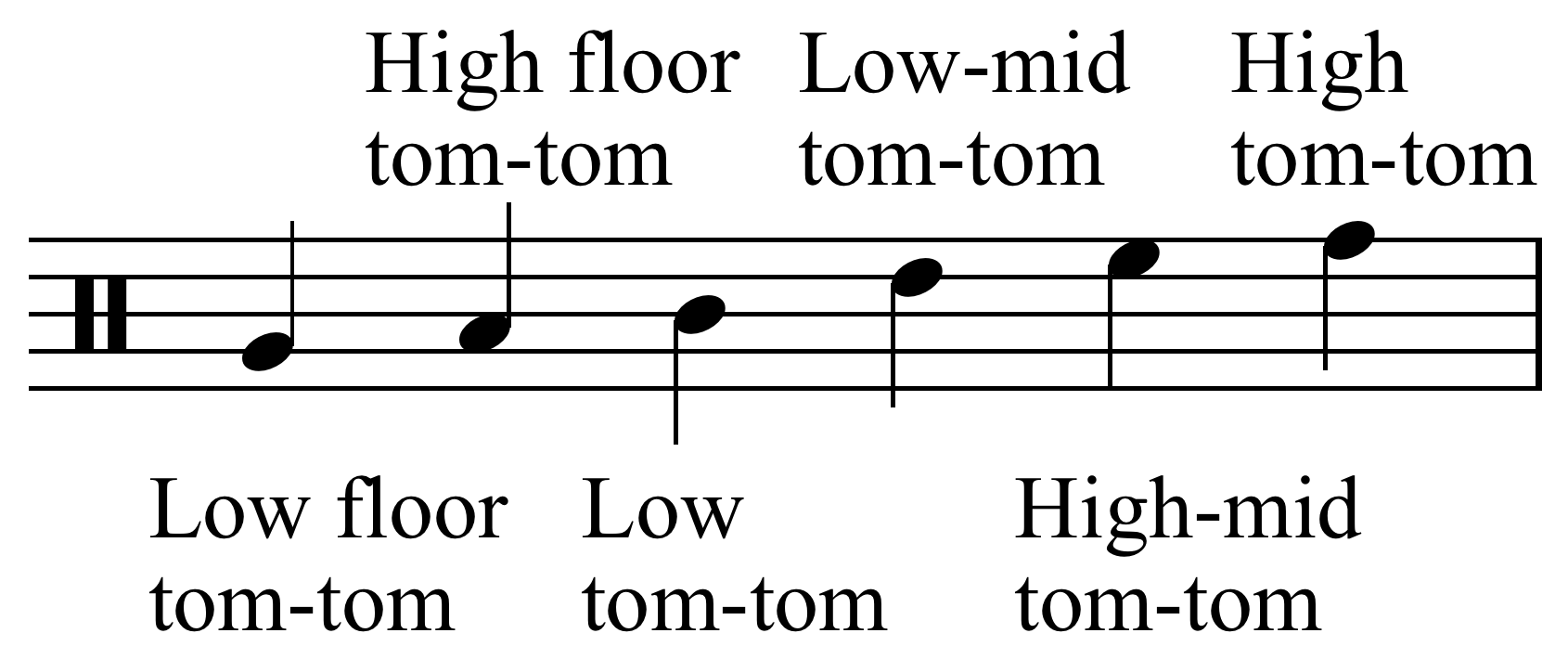
Standard drum notation for (up to six) toms.

=== Classic rock setups ===
==== Standard diameters ====
In the 1950s and early 1960s, it was common to have only a single hanging tom (a 13") and a single floor tom (16").

A basic rock configuration consists of 12" and 13" hanging toms, and a 16" floor tom with diameter × depth in inches used throughout this article. For a more detailed description of the conventions and their usage, see drum size conventions.

A basic fusion configuration refers to a set-up which has 10", 12" and 14" diameter toms. Note that these terms do not imply drum depths, so for example, the 14" in a fusion setup could have depth 10, 11, 12, or could be a 14×14 floor tom.

The terms "fusion" and "rock" are marketing terms invented by drum manufacturing companies, and there is no absolute definition for them; more a case of an accepted norm.

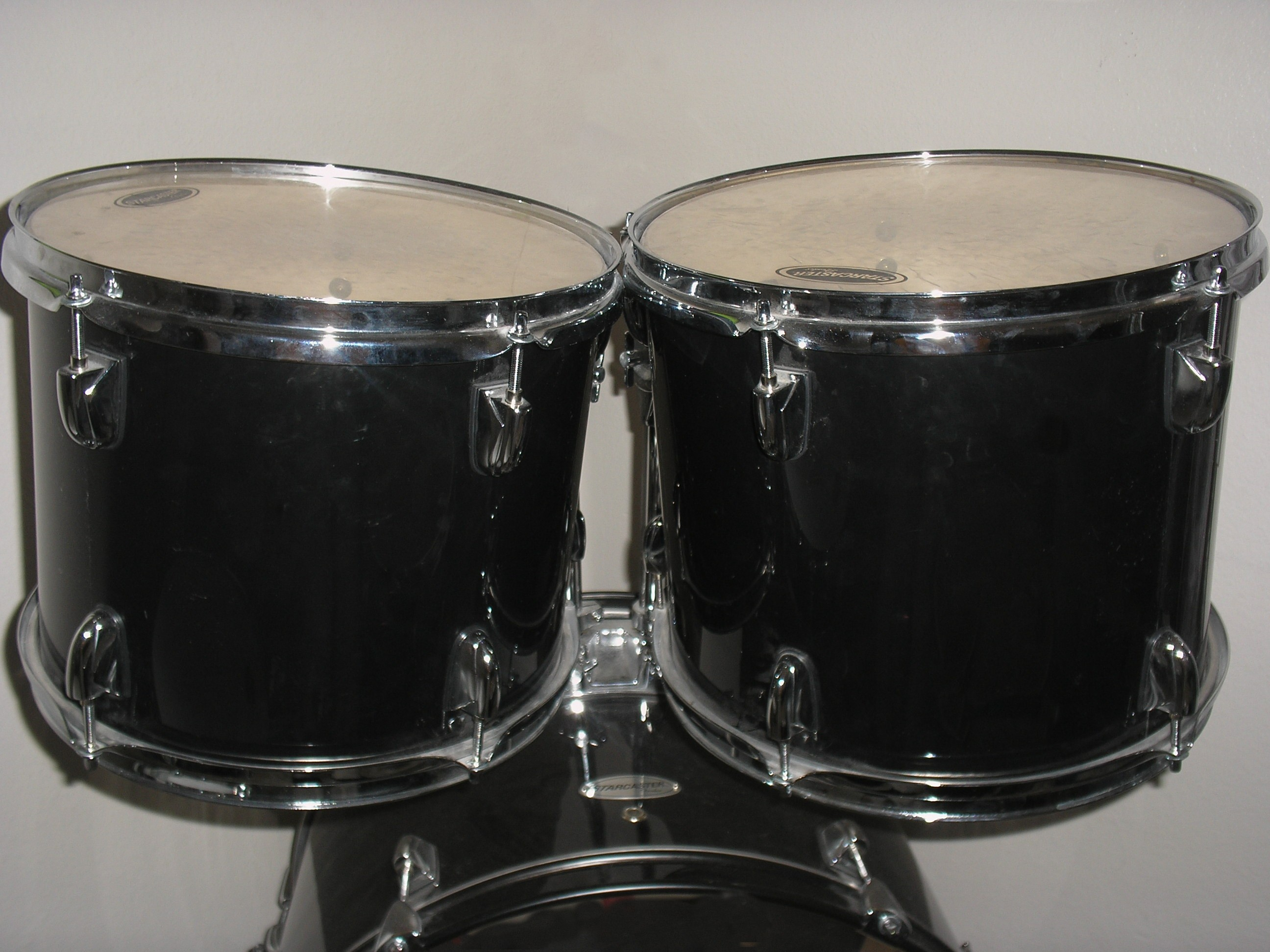
Tom-toms mounted on a bass drum

==== Standard depths ====
In the 1950–1980s the standard depth rack toms were 12×8 and 13×9. This "classic" configuration is still popular. Concert toms came in the early 1970s, with Ludwig producing single headed toms in 6x5.5, 8x5.5, 10x6.5, 12x8, 13x9, 14x10, 15x12, 16x14, etc. mounted in pairs on a stand.

"FAST" sizes are 10×8, 12×9, 13×10, etc., a marketing term used by DW, although not unique to DW, but with all drum manufacturers. The "New standard" sizes - 10×9, 12×10, 13×11, etc. are 2" deeper than what was considered "standard" in the 1950s. "Power" toms are one inch deeper than standard, with sizes of 10×9 or 10×10, 12×11, 13×12, which overtook the classic setup in popularity during the 1980s. Square - 10×10, 12×12, 13×13, etc., have been common in the 1980s and 1990s. Hyperdrive are shallow depths made popular initially by Tama: 10×6.5, 12×7, 13×7.5, etc.

== Variations ==
=== Single-headed ===
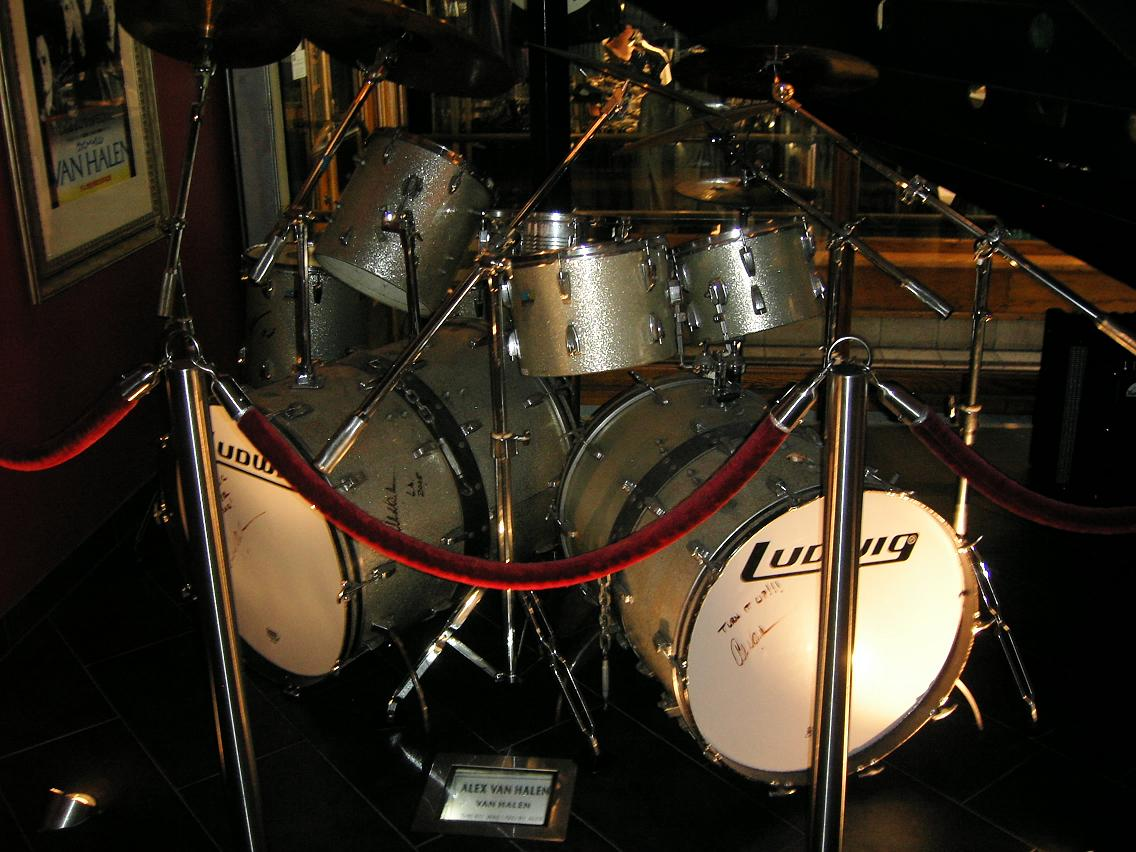
In the 1970s, Alex Van Halen simply removed the bottom heads from his hanging toms to create concert toms.

Single-headed tom-toms, also known as concert toms, have also been used in drum kits, though their use has fallen off in popularity since the 1970s. Concert toms have a single head and a shell slightly shallower than the corresponding double-headed tom. Phil Collins used four single-headed rack-mount toms and two floor toms (Gretsch) in his setup. They are generally easier to tune as they have no bottom head to adjust.

The term concert tom has also been used to describe double- or single-headed tom-tom drums designed for use in a concert band rather than in a drum kit.

=== Rototoms ===
Rototoms have no shell at all, just a single head and a steel frame. Unlike most other drums, they have a variable definite pitch and some composers write for them as a tuned instrument, demanding specific notes. They can be tuned quickly by rotating the head. Since the head rotates on a thread, this raises or lowers the head relative to the rim of the drum and so increases or decreases the tension in the head.

=== Gong bass drum ===
A gong bass drum (also known as "gong drum"), is a large, single-headed tom often sized at 20 in (51 cm) or 22 in (56 cm), with the drumhead being 2 in (5.1 cm) larger than the shell. The sound produced is similar to a bass drum, though it is more open and has longer sustain. They can be mounted with standard floor tom legs, though many drummers mount them at an angle next to the floor tom(s). Notable users include Neil Peart, Stewart Copeland, Bill Bruford, Simon Phillips, Jason Bittner, Mike Portnoy and Dom Howard.

=== Floor tom ===
A floor tom is a double-skin drum, most often but not always as deep as its diameter, traditionally mounted on three legs and to the drummer's right for a right-handed drummer. It is normally the deepest-toned drum played by sticks in the kit, above the bass drum but below all others, and the most resonant, more so than even the bass drum.

== Construction and manufacture ==
Typically, a tom consists of a shell, chromed or plated metal hardware and head. Shell depth standards vary according to the era of manufacture and drum style. Tom-toms are typically made in diameters of: 6 in (15 cm), 8 in (20 cm), 10 in (25 cm), 12 in (30 cm), 13 in (33 cm), 14 in (36 cm), 15 in (38 cm), 16 in (41 cm) and 18 in (46 cm), with heads to fit.

Tom-toms can be fitted with an adjustable mounting for a floor stand, or attachment to a bass drum or marching rig. They can be single- or double-headed.

=== Shell ===
A crucial factor in achieving superior tone quality and insuring durability, especially with wood, is the creation of perfectly round shells and much research and development has been put into this manufacturing technology.

Shells are often constructed of 6–8 wood plies (often using different woods e. g. mahogany and falkata — birch or maple are commonly used for single-wood plies), solid wood (turned) or man-made materials (e. g. fibreglass, pressed steel, acrylic glass, resin-composite). Wood or composite shells can be finished by laminating in plastic in a large variety of colours and effects (e. g. sparkle or polychromatic); natural wood may be stained or left natural and painted with clear lacquer. Steel is usually chromed, fibreglass self-coloured and acrylic glass tinted or clear.

=== Hardware ===
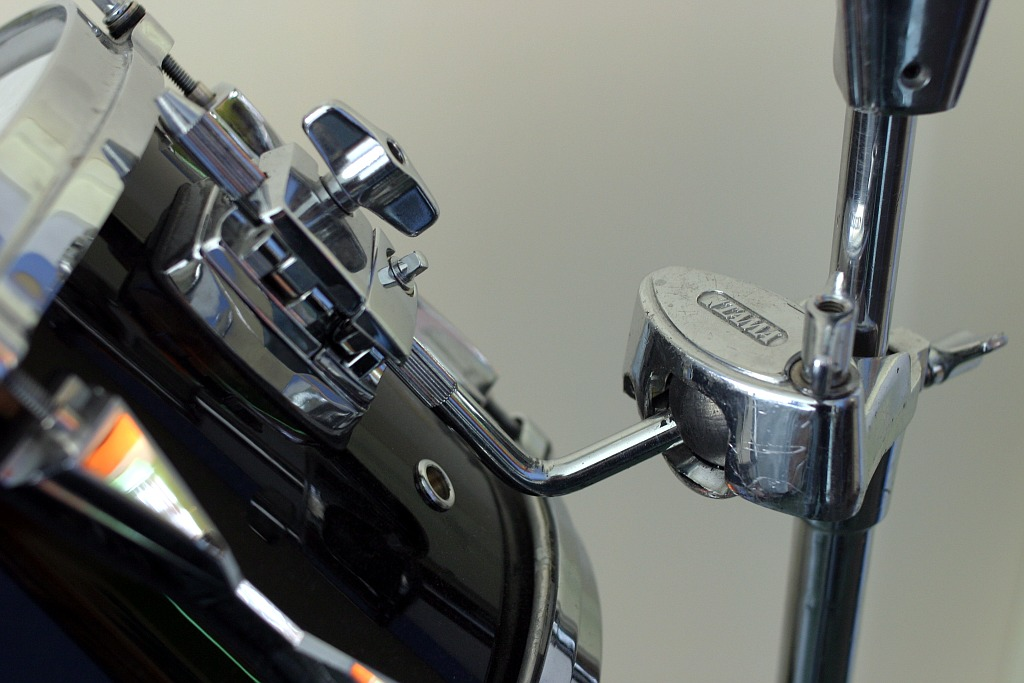
A shell-mounted clamp attached to ball-head floor stand.

For drum hardware, one or two cast or pressed metal rims attach by threaded tension rods or lugs to nut boxes bolted onto the shell and hold the heads onto the bearing edges of the shell. The tension rod assembly needs to be precision-machined, cast and fitted to enable predictable and secure tuning without inhibiting resonance or introducing extra vibration. All components will be placed under great tension and experience added stresses from playing.

Mounting systems vary greatly, from a simple cast block on the shell which accepts and clamps to a rod attached to a clamp or holder to much more sophisticated arrangements where there is no attachment to the shell, instead a frame clamps to the tuning lugs.

Another sort of rod clamp system allows attachment of the drum to the tom holder without the need of a hole in the drum shell for the rod to pass through. The clamp is attached to the shell at the nodal point with two bolts so as to allow the shell to vibrate freely without degrading the shell's dynamic range and sustain. The nodal point is the location on a shell with the least amount of vibration allowing for the mount to have minimal effect on the resonance of the shell.

Some drummers use a snare stand to hold and to make it easier to position the tom.

== Sound ==
Audio samples
Component	Content	Audio (Ogg Vorbis)
Toms	8-inch rack tom	59 KB
Toms	12-inch rack tom	41 KB
Toms	Floor tom	39 KB
See the Drums page at Wikimedia Commons for more
