= Rattle (percussion instrument) =

Percussion instruments

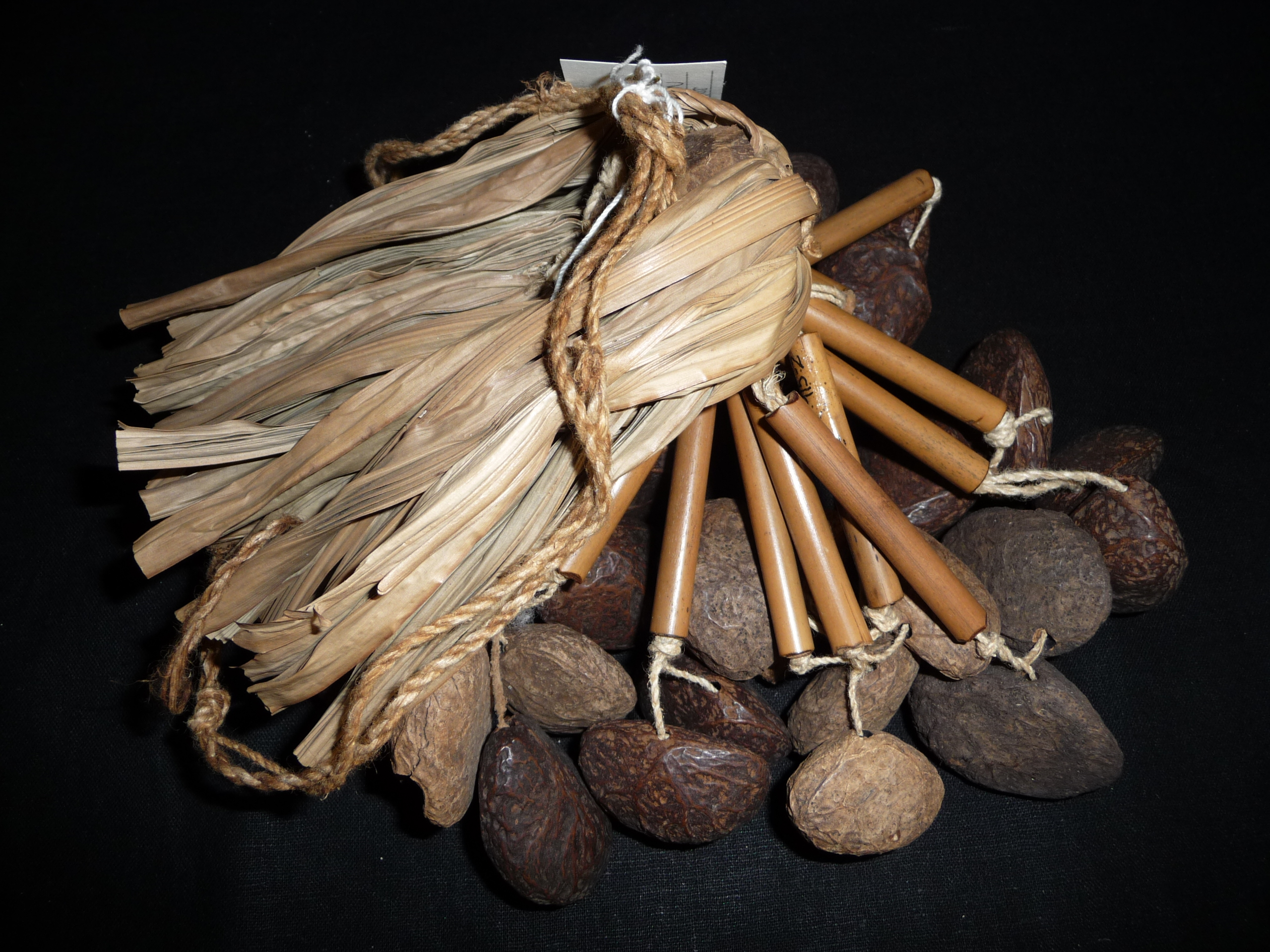
Rattle from Papua New Guinea, made from leaves, seeds and coconut shell, to be tied around a dancer's ankle

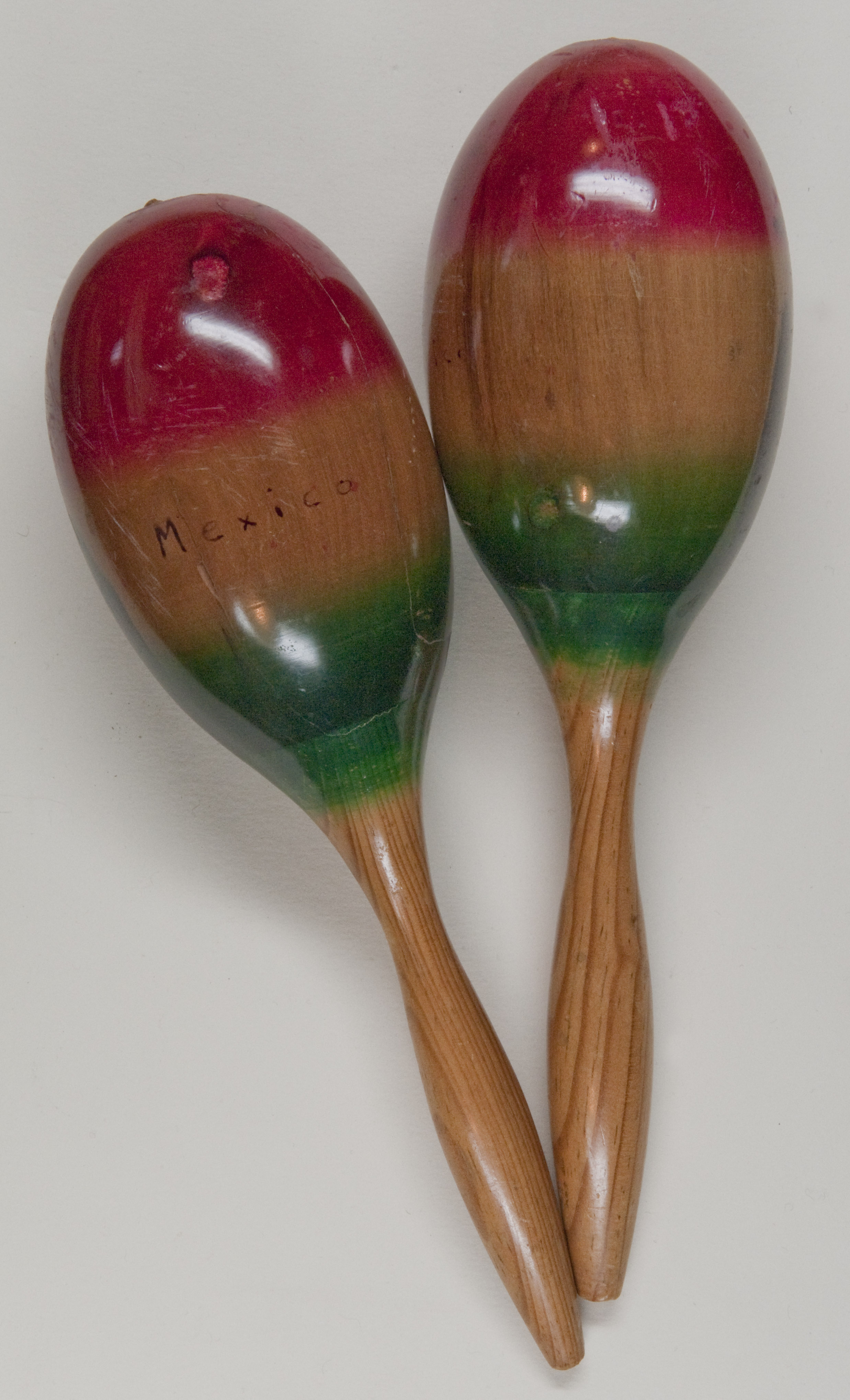
Maracas from Mexico

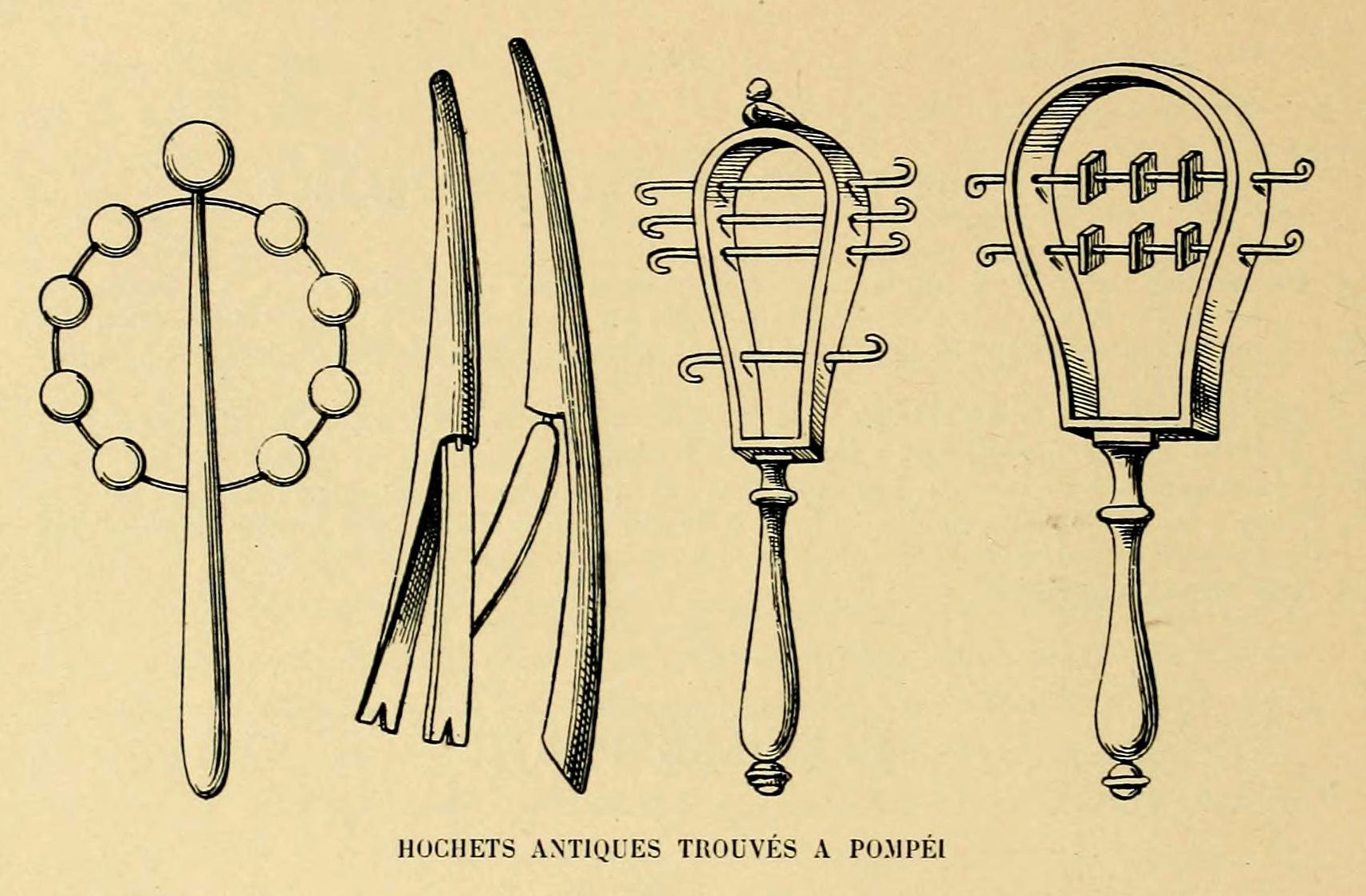
Rattles from Pompeii.

A rattle is a type of percussion instrument which produces a sound when shaken. Rattles are described in the Hornbostel–Sachs system as Shaken Idiophones or Rattles (112.1).

According to Sachs,

SHAKEN IDIOPHONES are rattles (not to be confused with clappers). The material is important, but more important is the arrangement of the sounding parts that strike together when the implement is shaken.

Rattles include:

- Maracas, widely used in Cha Cha Cha and jazz.
  - Chac-chac, as known in Trinidad, Dominica and the French Antilles.
- The egg-shaped plastic chicken shake, filled with steel shot and available in varying tones depending on the size and quantity of shot.
- Folk instruments especially used in ceremonial dance.
- Toy rattles for infants.

Though there are many different sorts of rattles, some music scores indicate simply a rattle (or the corresponding terms French claquette, hochet; Ger. Rassel, Schnarre; It. nacchere).

== Examples ==
- Chankana
- Ganzá
- Hosho
- Maracas
- Maracitos
- Katsa
- Chajchas
- Rainstick
- Kashaka
- Sistra

== History ==
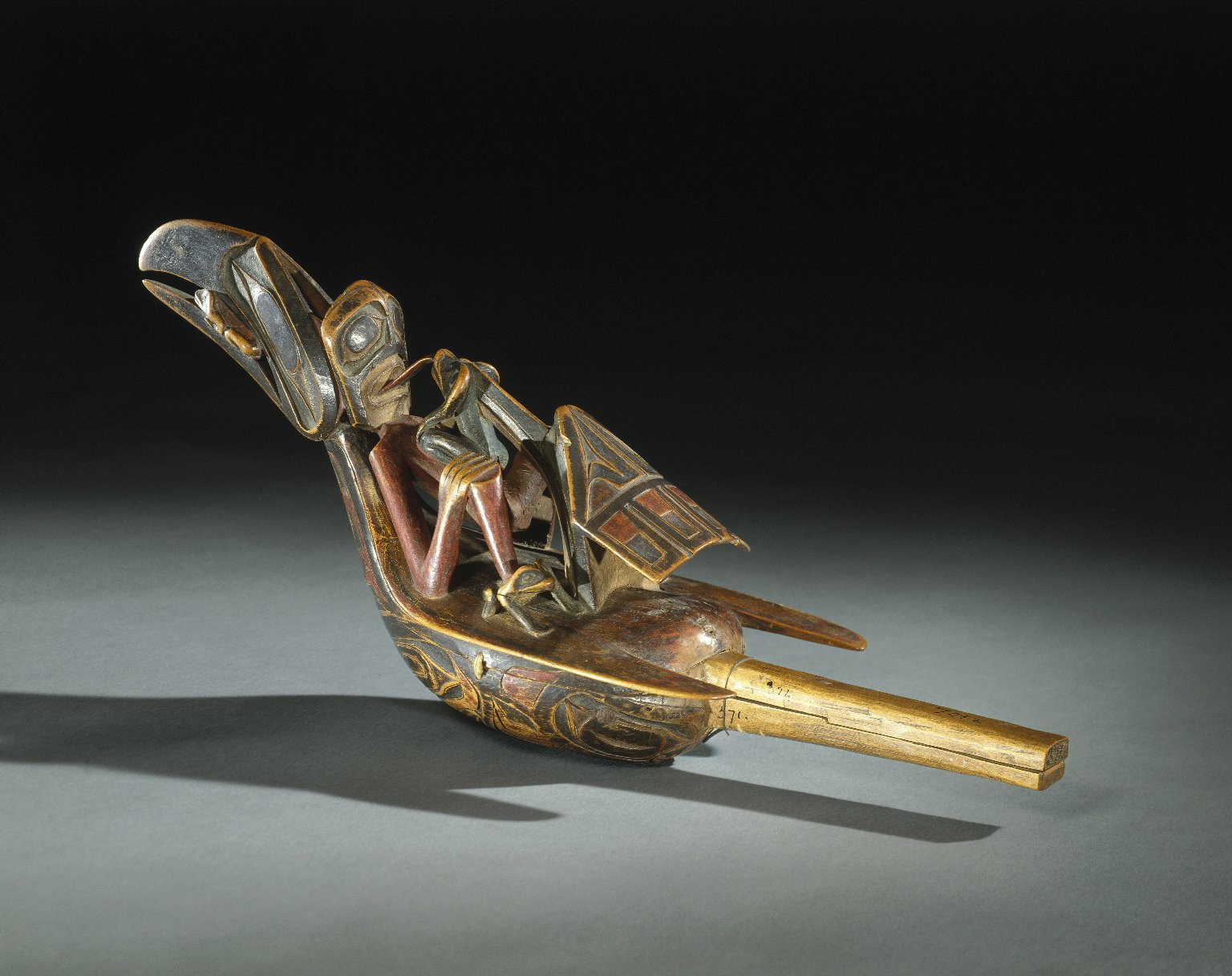
Raven Rattle, 19th century, Brooklyn Museum

In Ancient Egypt, rattles were used during funerary rituals to signify regeneration in the after-life. Rattles were viewed as sacred and became the forerunners of the sistrum. The earliest Egyptian rattles were ovular and made of pottery. During the Predynastic and Old Kingdom periods rattles gained handles and different shapes and were made out of different materials such as basket, wood, and stone.

Native American people often use rattles in ceremonial dances. Oftentimes, these rattles are meant to represent something. Each figure or depiction can relate to something sacred to their tribe. Often, the sound of rattles forms a connection to the supernatural world when the rattles are employed by shamans. The use of the raven rattle, like the one pictured to the right, always implies power, which when used in dances, symbolize the status of the chief, who has a hereditary right to use the rattle.

== See also ==
- Indirectly struck idiophones
- Rattle (percussion beater)
- Rattle (disambiguation)
- Baby rattle
