= Crotalus (instrument) =

Christian liturgical instrument

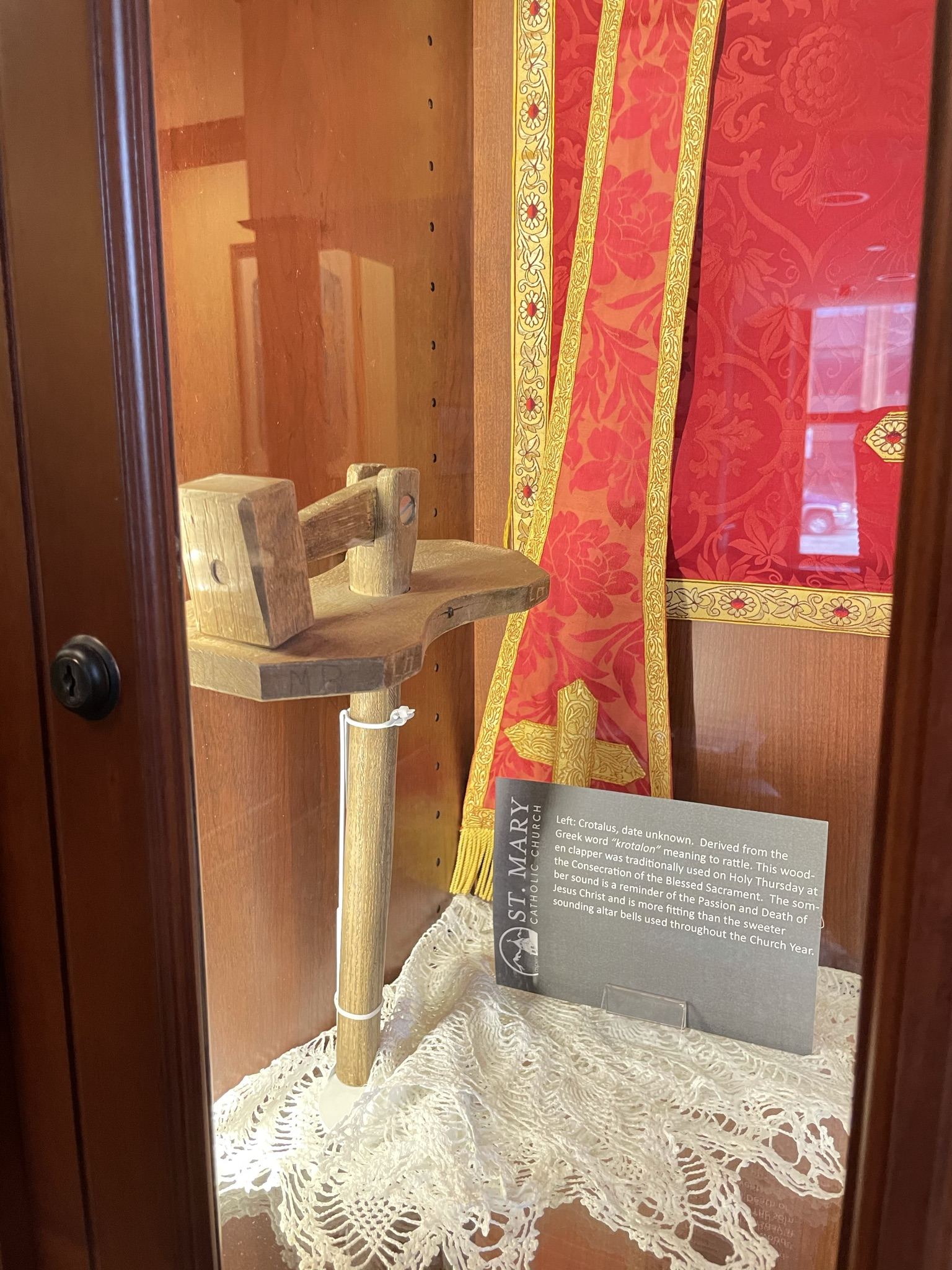
A crotalus on display

A crotalus (Spanish: matraca), also known as a crotalum or clapper, is a wooden liturgical rattle or clapper that replaces altar bells during the celebration of the Tridentine Paschal Triduum at the end of Lent in the Catholic Church. The crotalus is also occasionally used during the celebration of liturgies according to the Ordinary Form Roman Missal during the Paschal Triduum, but its popularity decreased following the liturgical reforms of the Second Vatican Council. The crotalus is also used by some Lutheran and the Episcopal Church congregations.

== Etymology ==
The Latin word crotalus (and the less frequently referenced liturgical instrument crotalum) derive from the Ancient Greek krotalon (κρόταλον). The latter term referred to a type of clapper, rattle, or castanet as used in Ancient Greece and Egypt.

== Appearance and use ==
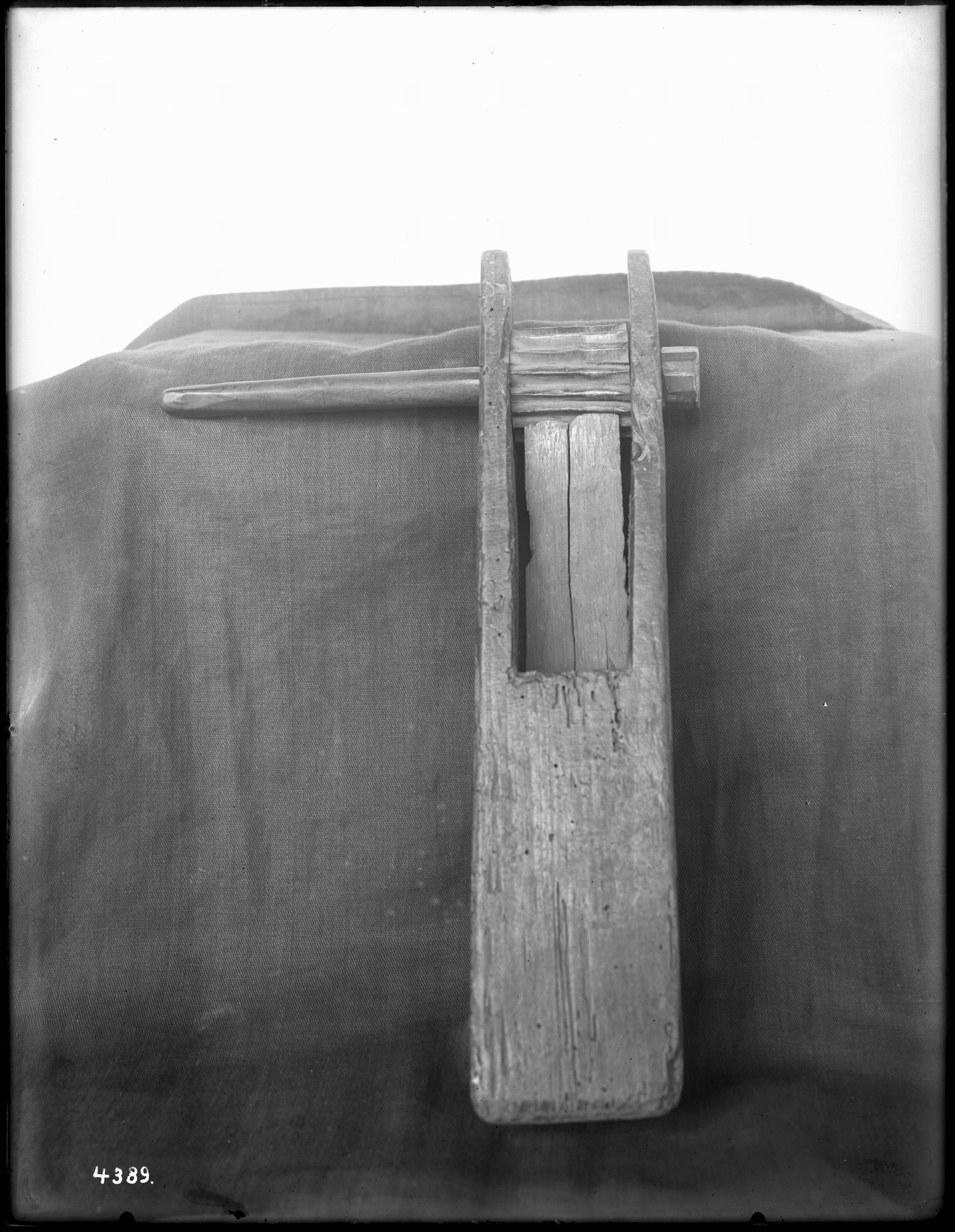
A matraca from Mission Santa Barbara, c. 1900

Made from wood, the particular style and manner of noise-making varies between different clappers. Some use an integral hammer that strikes the wood, while others use a piece of wood that rides over a gear to make a clicking noise. Historian James Stevens Curl considered the crotalus a descendant of the sistrum, an ancient Egyptian ritual instrument. Historically, the crotalus was common in Maundy Thursday Ethiopic liturgies.

The Memoriale Rituum, a former Roman Rite liturgical book for parochial usage in certain times of the liturgical calendar, prescribed that the altar bells would not be rung after being used to announce the Gloria at Mass on Maundy Thursday until the Easter Vigil on Holy Saturday, a practice which remains in some use. The Memoriale Rituum prescribed that the crotalus replaced bells for announcing the Angelus following both the Mass and the Stripping of the Altar. Ritual books do not prescribe the crotalus's use in other instances where the bells would have been rung, but rattling the crotalus in the stead of each bell ring has been accepted as appropriate practice during the Paschal Triduum liturgies. Among these are the elevations during the Mass of the Lord's Supper, where the unpleasant noise made by the crotalus reflects the morose character of the Paschal Triduum. The 1595 Union of Brest, the agreement establishing full communion between the Catholic Church and the Eastern Catholic Ruthenian Uniate Church, mandated that the Latin practice of prohibiting bells on Good Friday would not be required of Byzantine Rite Catholics.

Sephardi Jews immigrating to Spanish imperial holdings in the Americas following their 1492 expulsion from Spain would bring ceremonial objects with them. Among these were gragers for celebrating Purim, which could pass as the matracha of Catholic usage.

In Rome, the instrument sometimes appears similar to baby rattles. The crotalus is used during the Austrian Holy Week tradition of Ratcheting (German: Ratschen), wherein children will alternate between ratcheting and chanting, with a reward typically following.

== See also ==
- Christus factus est
- Epiclesis
- Liturgical dance
- Tenebrae
