= Katsa (instrument) =

Rattle used in Malagasy music

Katsa (also known as faray) is a rattle used in Malagasy music.
