= Chajchas =

Percussion instrument

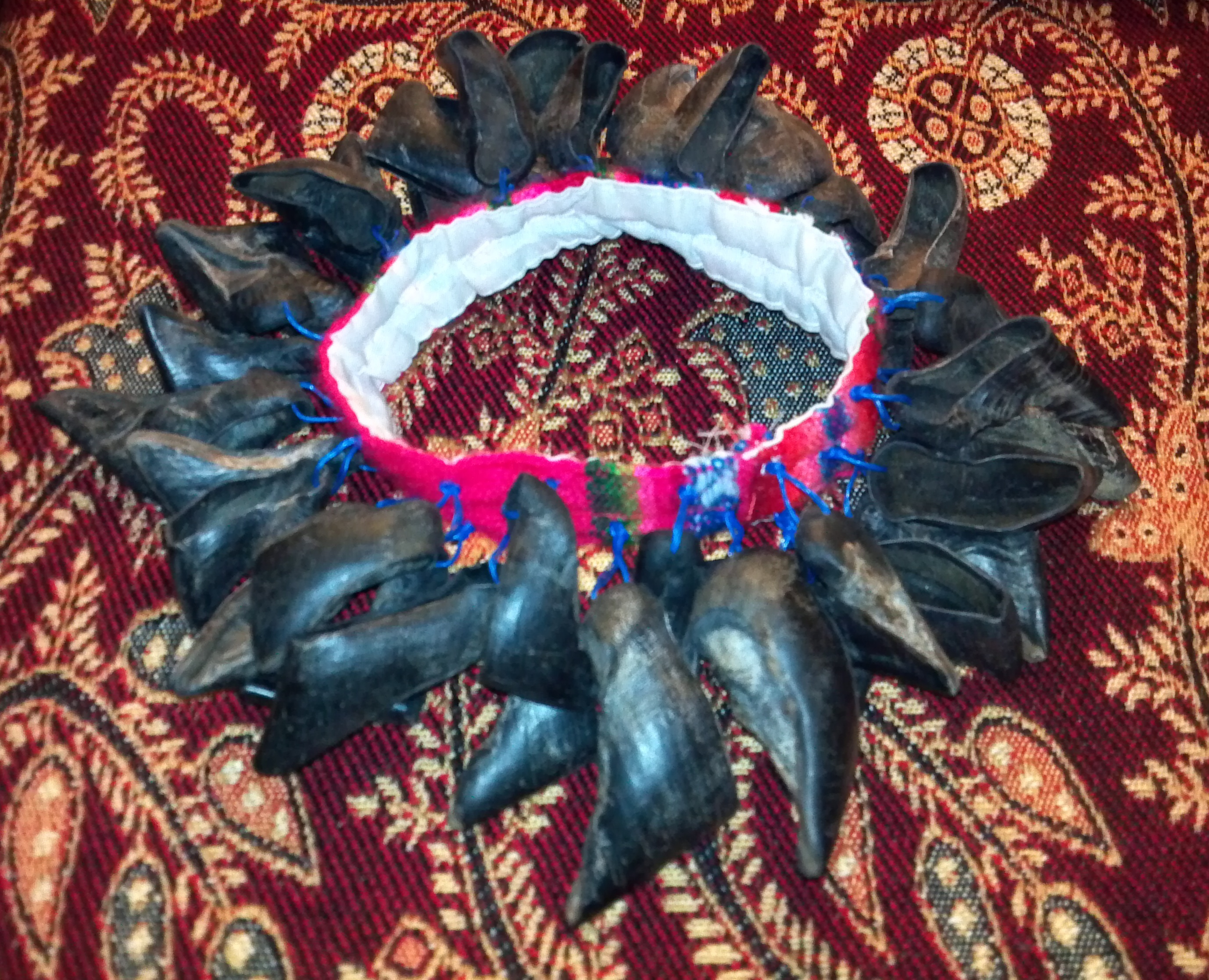

Percussion instrument
- Other names: Chapchas; Uñas
- Classification: Percussion
- Hornbostel–Sachs classification: 112.1 (Shaken Idiophones or Rattles)

Chajchas (also chapchas; Spanish: uñas, "toenails") are a small percussion instrument of the rattle family, typically made from goat or sheep hooves, and originating in the Central Andes. The instrument is used in traditional rituals and ceremonies, and can also be heard in much of the folk music of the region, especially the countries of Colombia, Bolivia, Peru, Chile, Ecuador.

It consists of a number of dried hooves (which may also come from llamas or alpacas) strung onto a colorful piece of fabric, often elasticated, which allows the instrument to be worn as a bracelet around the wrist or ankle. They are typically played in pairs, and may be used in ceremonial dances.
