= Grager =

Purim noisemaker

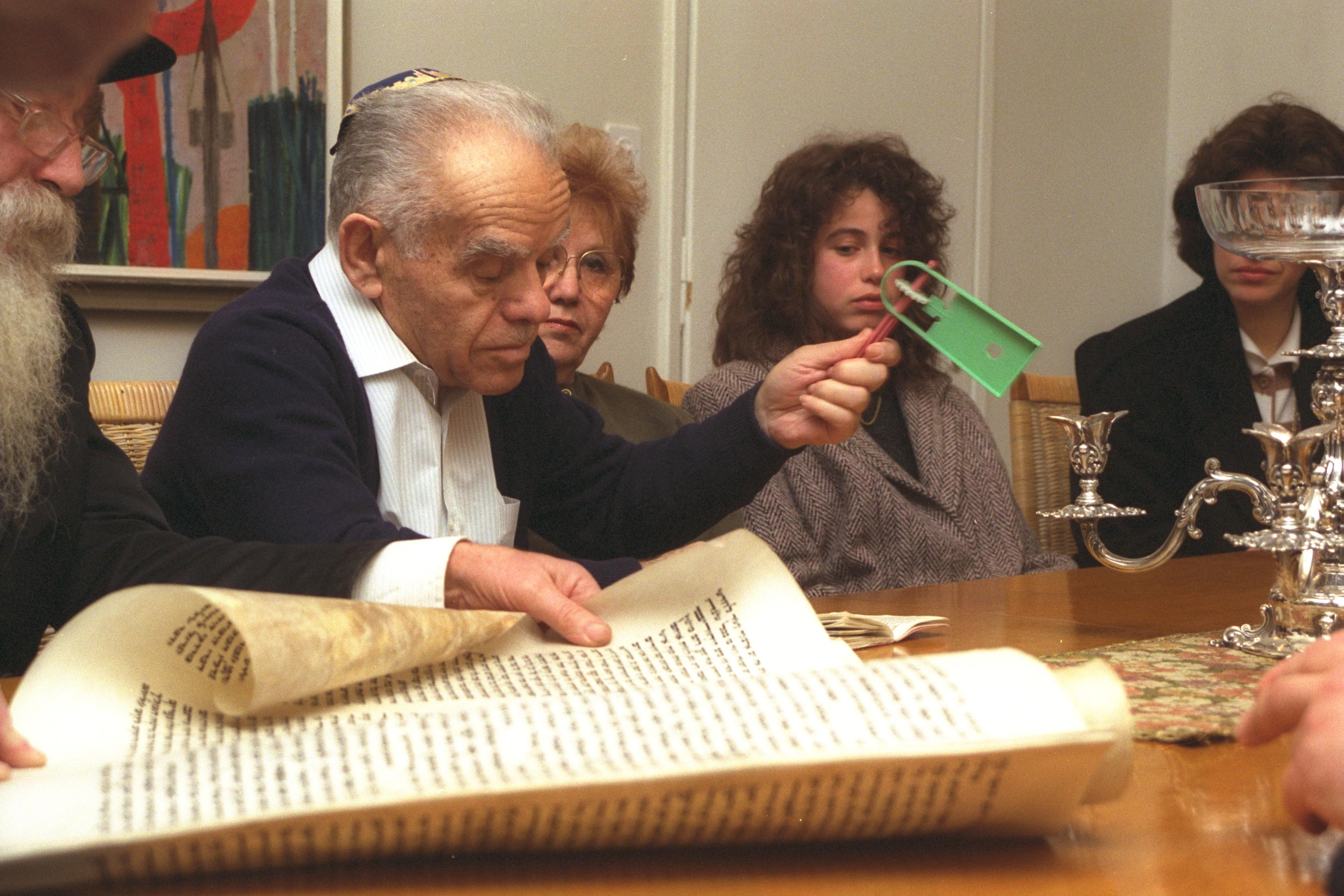
Yitzhak Shamir spinning a gragger

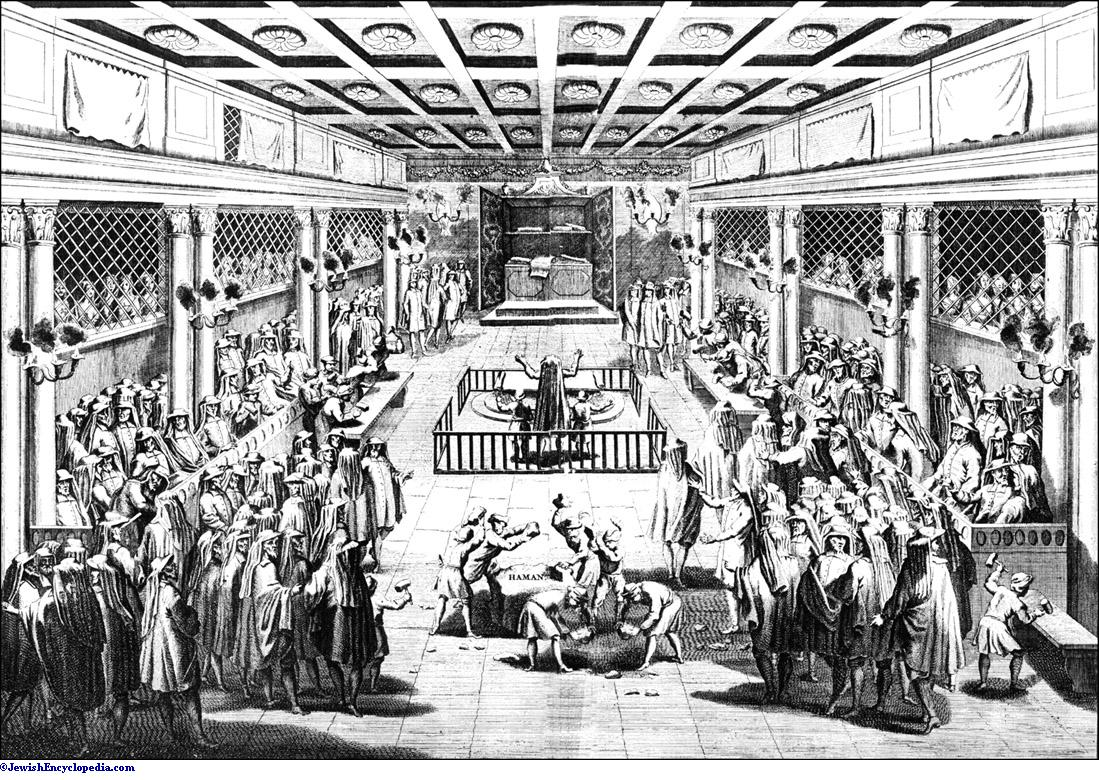
Knocking out Haman's name from stones

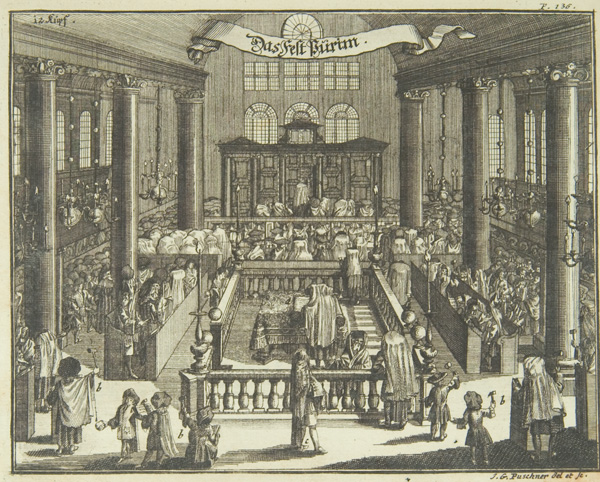
18th century Megillah reading; children with graggers in the back

A grager (Yiddish: גראַגער, 'rattler'), also gragger, grogger or gregger, is a noisemaking device, most commonly a ratchet, used to make noise by the congregation when the name of Haman is read out during the recitation of the Megillah in the synagogue during the celebration of Purim in order to blot out Haman's name. This is done in accordance with the passage in the Midrash which commented that the verse from Deuteronomy "Thou shalt blot out the remembrance of Amalek" must be understood "even from wood and stones". Traditionally Haman is believed to be an offspring of Amalek, and a tradition had developed to write the name of Haman on stones and to knock them until the name is blotted out.

== Etymology ==
Eliezer Ben-Yehuda initially suggested the word Hebrew: מנענע, 'shaker', for the Purim noisemaker, but under the influence of Yiddish the term Hebrew: רעשן ra'ashan for rattler (from the Hebrew ra-ash, meaning 'noise', suggested by Ben Yehuda's son, Itamar Ben-Avi) was accepted.

== Origins and controversies ==
The custom can be traced back to the Tosafists of the 13th century, and the leading Sephardic and Ashkenazi halachic authorities, Rabbi Yosef Karo, and Rabbi Moshe Isserles stated "one should not nullify the custom or belittle it", as the custom bears meaning and significance. Some later rabbis of the 19th century, including Sefardi chief rabbis of Jerusalem, Raphael Meir Panigel, and of Izmir, Haim Palachi, protested against the noisemaking tradition, considering it an improper disturbance obstructing the reciting of the Megillah.

Sephardi Jews immigrating to Spanish imperial holdings in the Americas following their 1492 expulsion from Spain would bring ceremonial objects with them. Among these were gragers for celebrating Purim, which could pass as the matracha of Catholic usage.

== Manner of noisemaking ==
While the blotting out was originally done by clapping two stones or pieces of wood on which "Haman" had been written or drawn, today the noisemaking of "blotting out" is the common practice. Many Kabbalists and Chassidim would stamp their heels, which represent Amalek, the ancestor of Haman. Some have the custom to only make noise when Haman is mentioned with a title or adjective.

Rabbi Shimon Apisdorf suggests that any noisemaker will do: "alarm clocks, toddler xylophones, dolls that cry with the push of a button, a toy police car with siren and flashing lights or anything else that will make a wonderfully annoying noise".

== Gallery ==
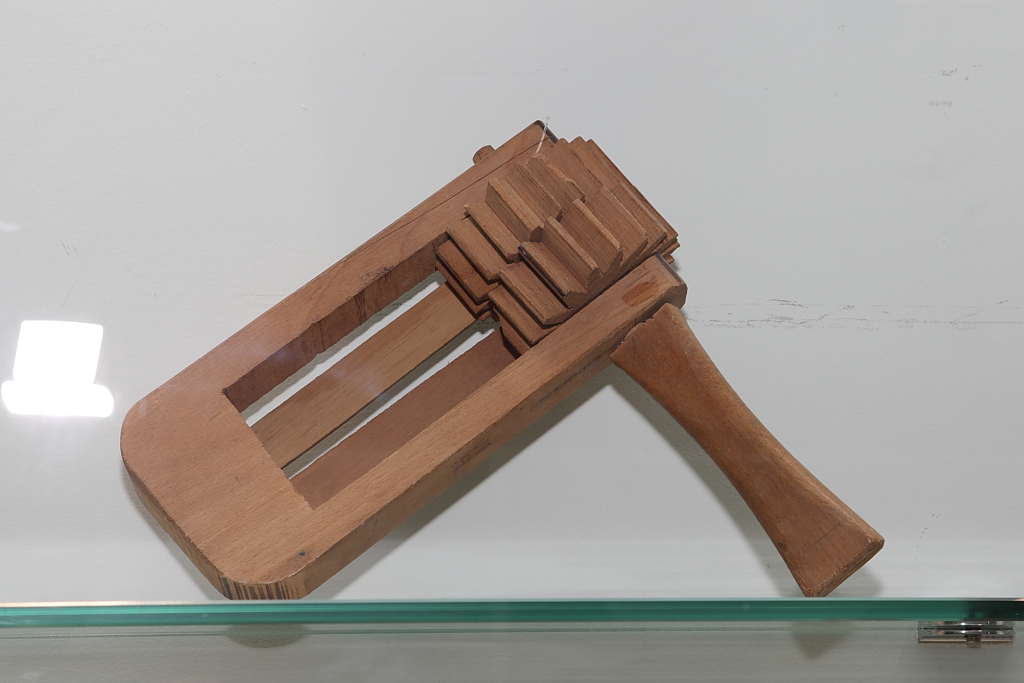

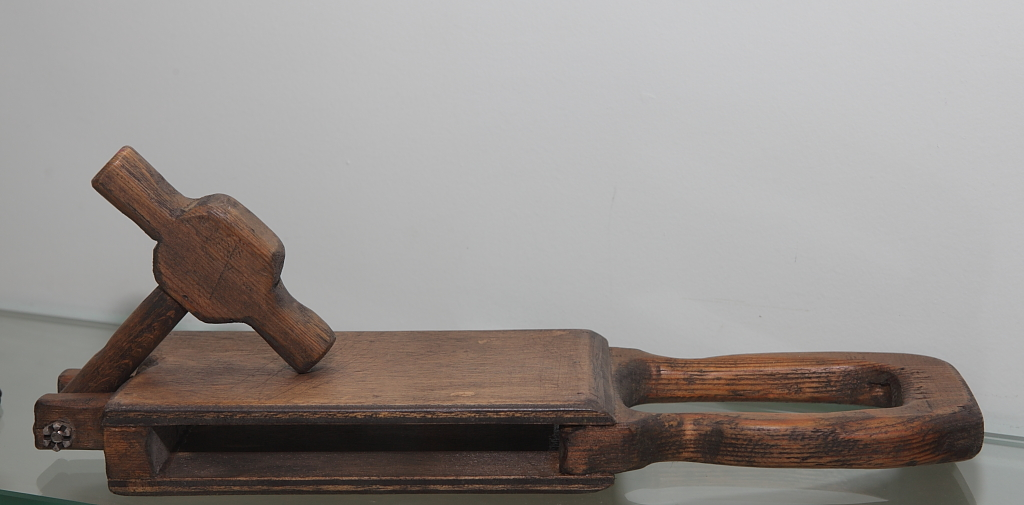

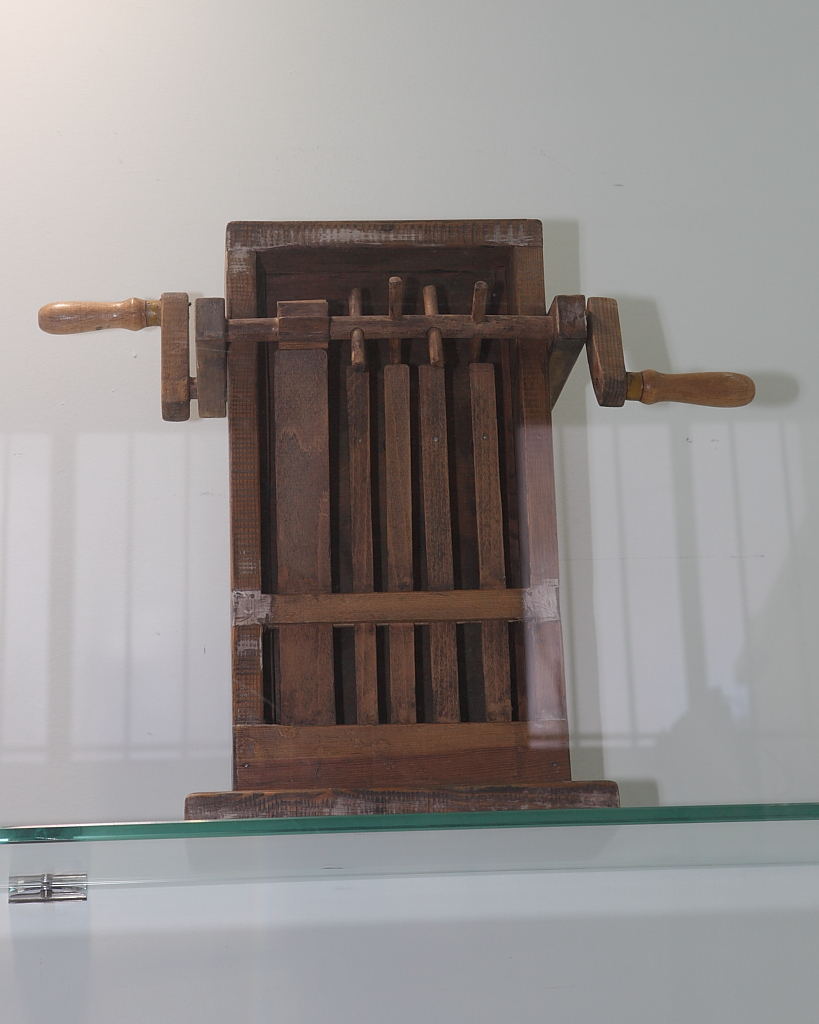

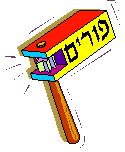

== See also ==
- Yimakh shemo ("May his name be erased")
- Crotalus, a similar object used by Christians during the Paschal Triduum
