= Ratchet (instrument) =

Idiophone

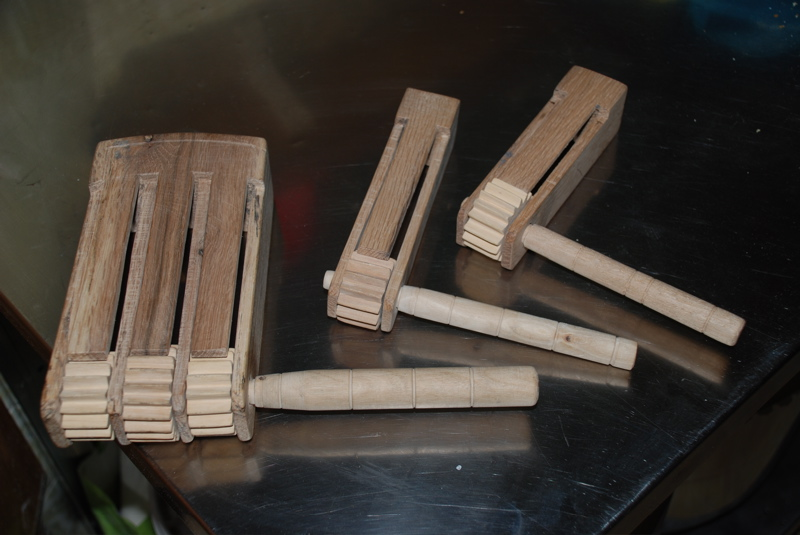
- Classification: Idiophone
- Hornbostel–Sachs classification: 112.24 (Scraped wheels – cog rattles or Ratchet)

Related instruments
- Derkach

A ratchet or rattle, more specifically, cog rattle is a musical instrument of the percussion family and a warning/signaling device. It operates on the principle of the ratchet device, using a gearwheel and a stiff board mounted on a handle, which rotates freely. Variants include the gragger (Yiddish: גראַגער) used in Judaism, the crotalus, the rapach, and the raganella.

== Method of playing ==
The player holds the handle and swings the whole mechanism around. The momentum makes the board click against the gearwheel, producing a clicking and rattling noise. A popular design consists of a thick wooden cog wheel attached to a handle and two wooden flanges that alternately hit the teeth of the cog when the handle turns. Alternatively, smaller ratchets are sometimes held still or mounted and the handle turned rapidly by the player. The mounted ratchets allow for greater control of the duration and timing of the sound. This allows the ratchet to be used like a snare drum, placing sustained rolls in precise durations of time. Dynamics are controlled by the rate at which the ratchet is rotated.

== Uses ==
=== In Jewish tradition ===
In Judaism, the gragger (also grogger or gregger; from Yiddish גראַגער) is used for the holiday of Purim. The gragger is used every time Haman's name is mentioned during the reading of the Megillah. Because Haman persecuted the Jews, the noise is supposed to symbolically drown out his name (although every word of the Megillah, including Haman's name, must be heard clearly; therefore, the words are often repeated after the sounding of the gragger). The gragger originated in Jewish tradition to help make noise during the reading.

=== Music ===
The rattle is used in such compositions as Richard Strauss's Till Eulenspiegel's Merry Pranks and Arnold Schoenberg's Gurre-Lieder. Respighi asks for one in the first movement of his orchestral work Pini di Roma (Pines of Rome), as does Tchaikovsky in his ballet, The Nutcracker. It is also used in "Gnomus" in Ravel's orchestration of Mussorgsky's Pictures at an Exhibition. In orchestral percussion writing, a ratchet is used as a substitute.

=== Sport ===
Up until the early 1970s, this type of rattle was commonly used by fans at soccer and rugby matches in the United Kingdom and was known as a football rattle.

=== Warning/signaling device ===
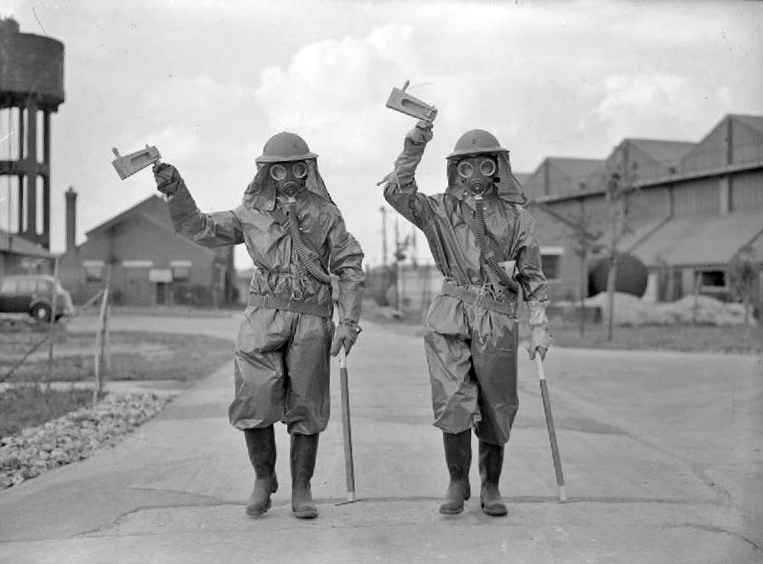
RAF men sound warning rattles during a gas exercise in World War II.

In the 18th and 19th centuries, a policeman's rattle was used by British and Australian policemen to summon assistance. They were used to warn of poison gas attack in the trenches of the First World War and issued to British police and ARP wardens during the Second World War, to warn of the presence of poison gas.

== Variants ==
=== Raganella ===
The raganella (Italian for "tree frog") is a percussion instrument, invented by Archytas of Taranto, common in the folk music of Puglia and Calabria in southern Italy. Technically, the raganella is a "cog rattle", producing a sound that is enough of a "croak" to have derived the folk name of the instrument from the Italian name of the common tree-frog. The raganella is about the size of a breadbox and consists of a wooden frame into which are fastened four or five stiff but flexible wooden tines fastened to one side of the frame; the other ends of the tines are struck in rapid succession by a cog-wheel that is turned by a crank handle mounted on the side of the frame.

=== Rapach ===
The rapach (Ukrainian: Рапач) is a larger version of the derkach, a ratchet. Rapachs are used by churches in the Prešov region of Slovakia by ethnic Ukrainians instead of bells during Easter.

== Gallery ==
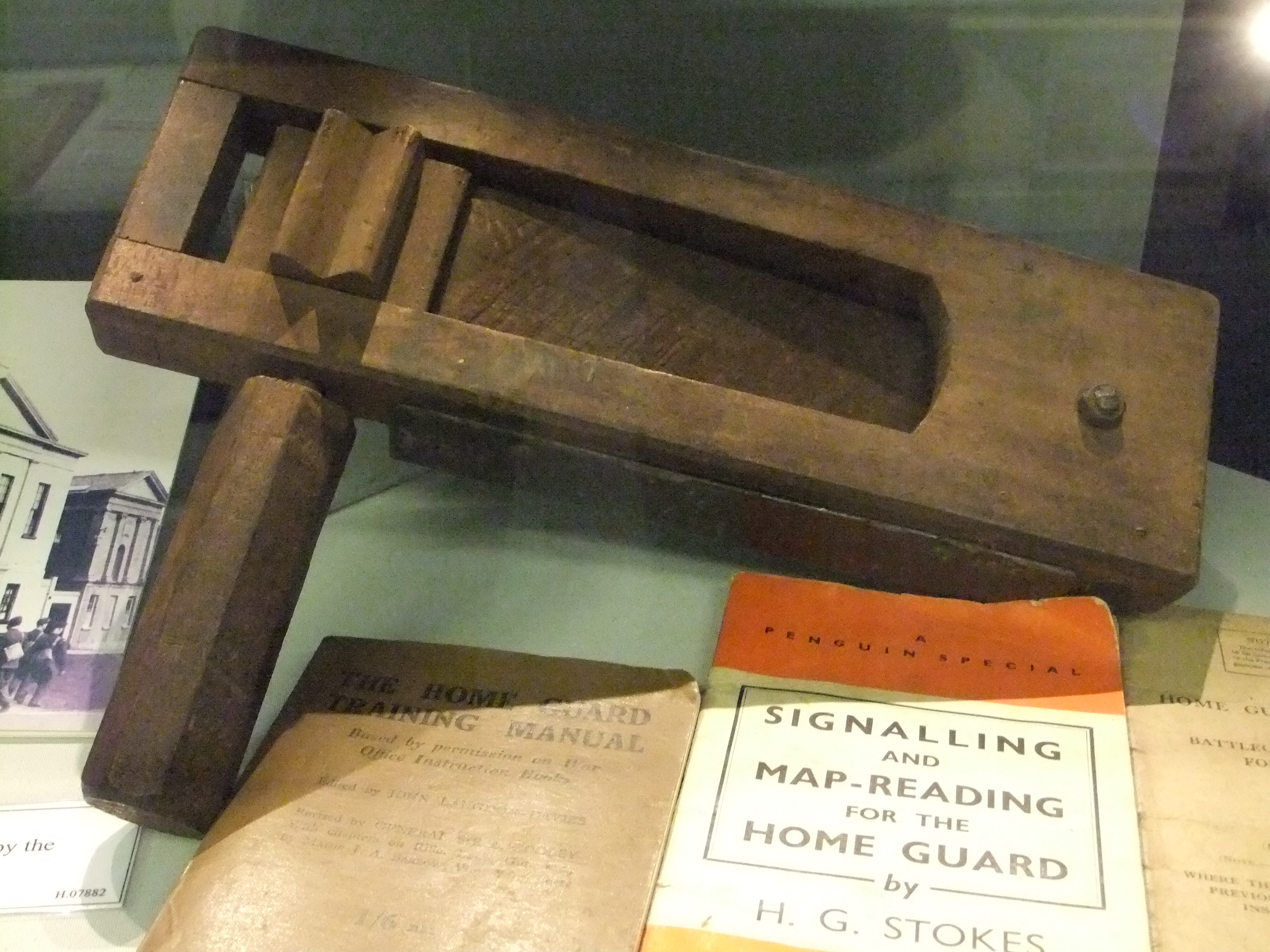
Ratchet used for poison gas warning in World War II

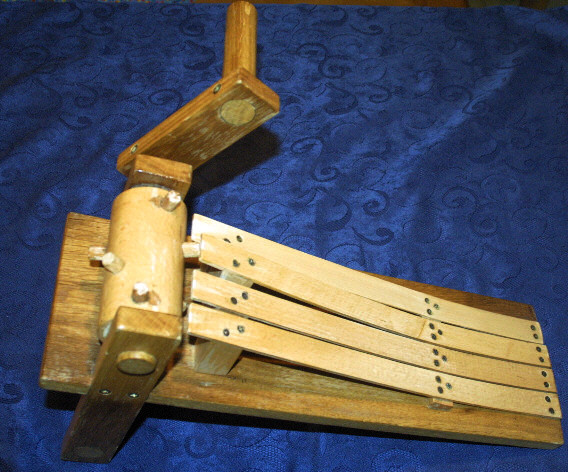
Raspel

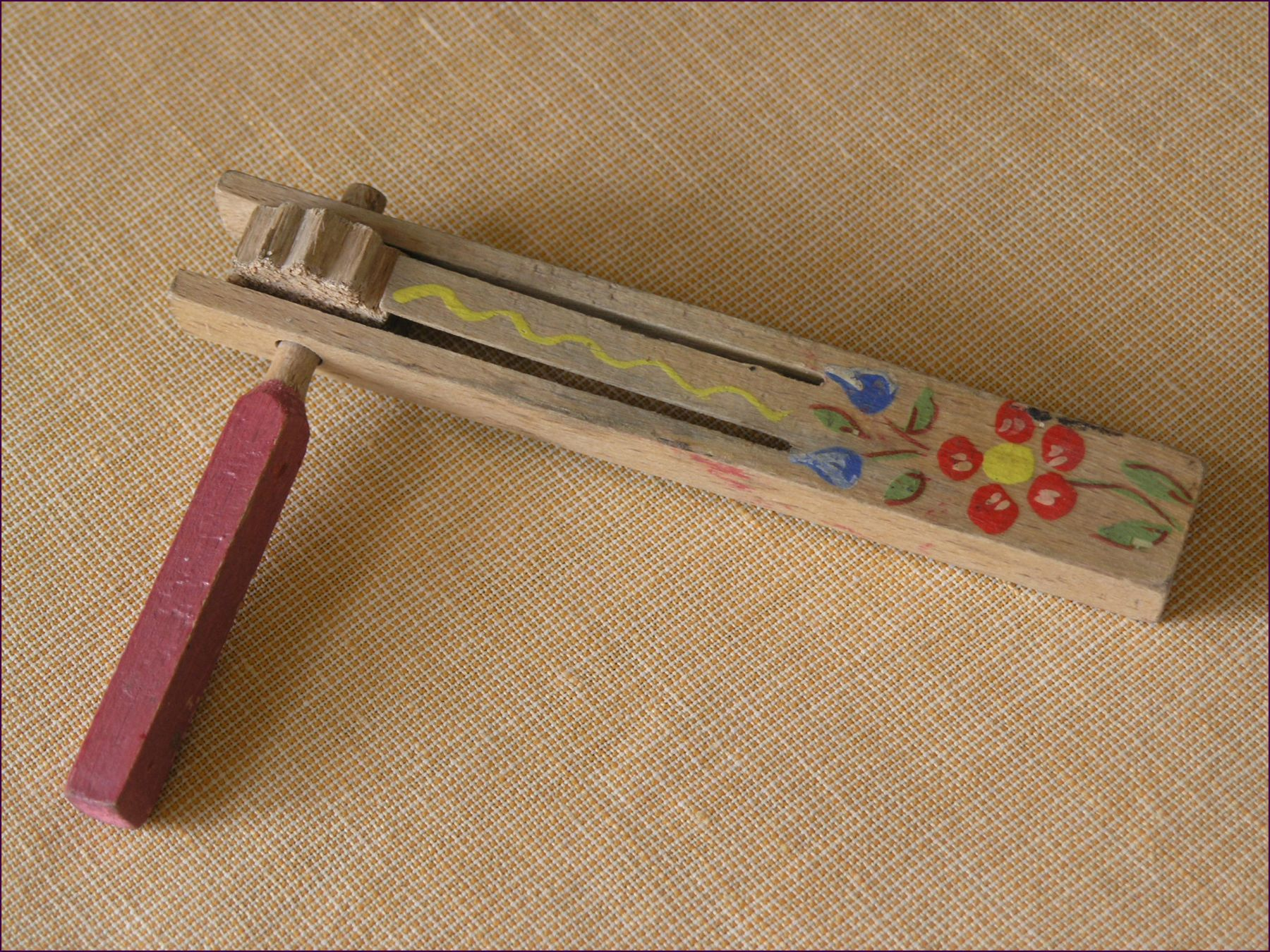
In some European churches, a ratchet known as a crotalum is used instead of bells during the Paschal Triduum, the three days before Easter Day.

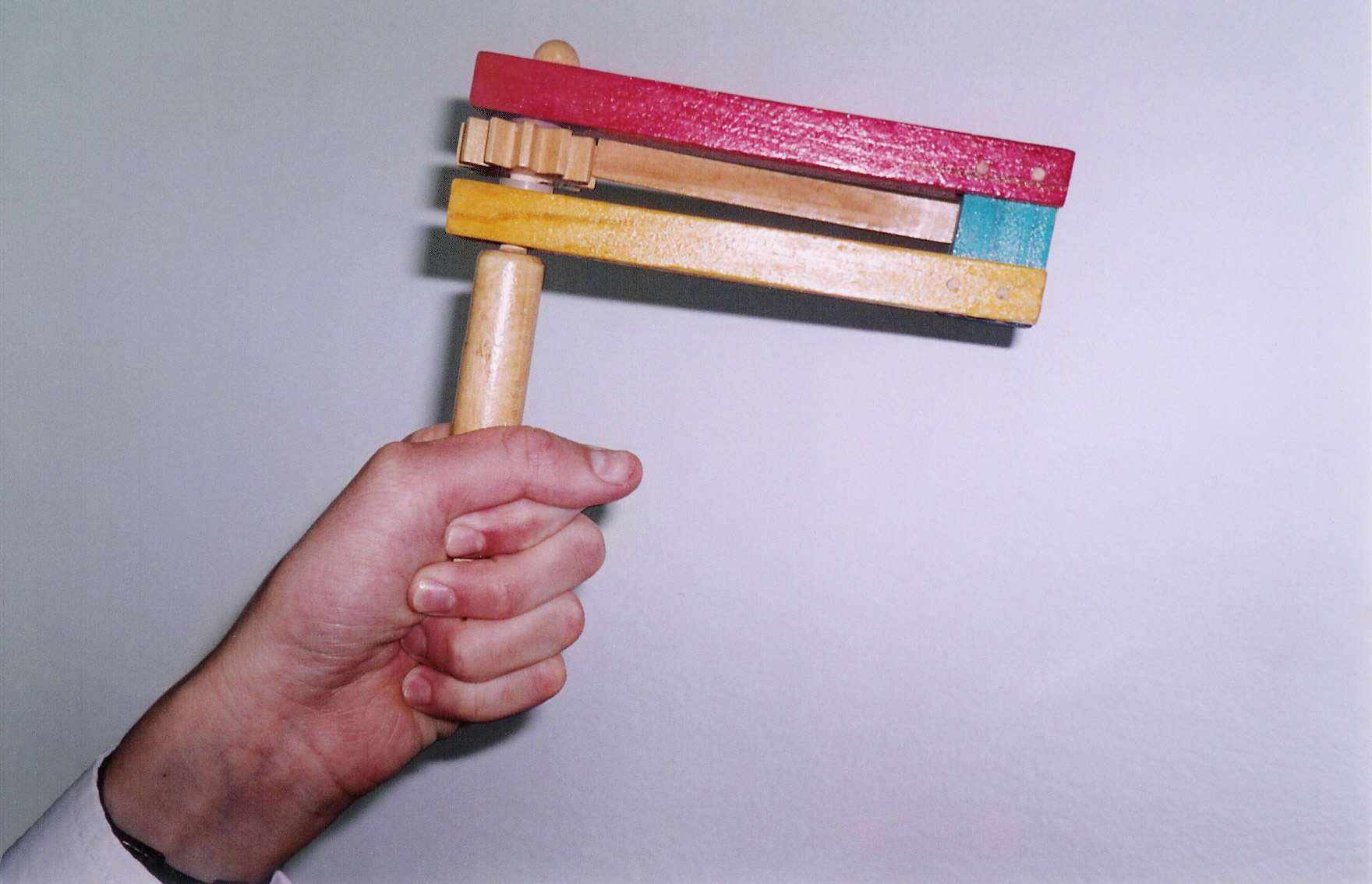
A Purim gragger, a kind of ratchet used in Judaism

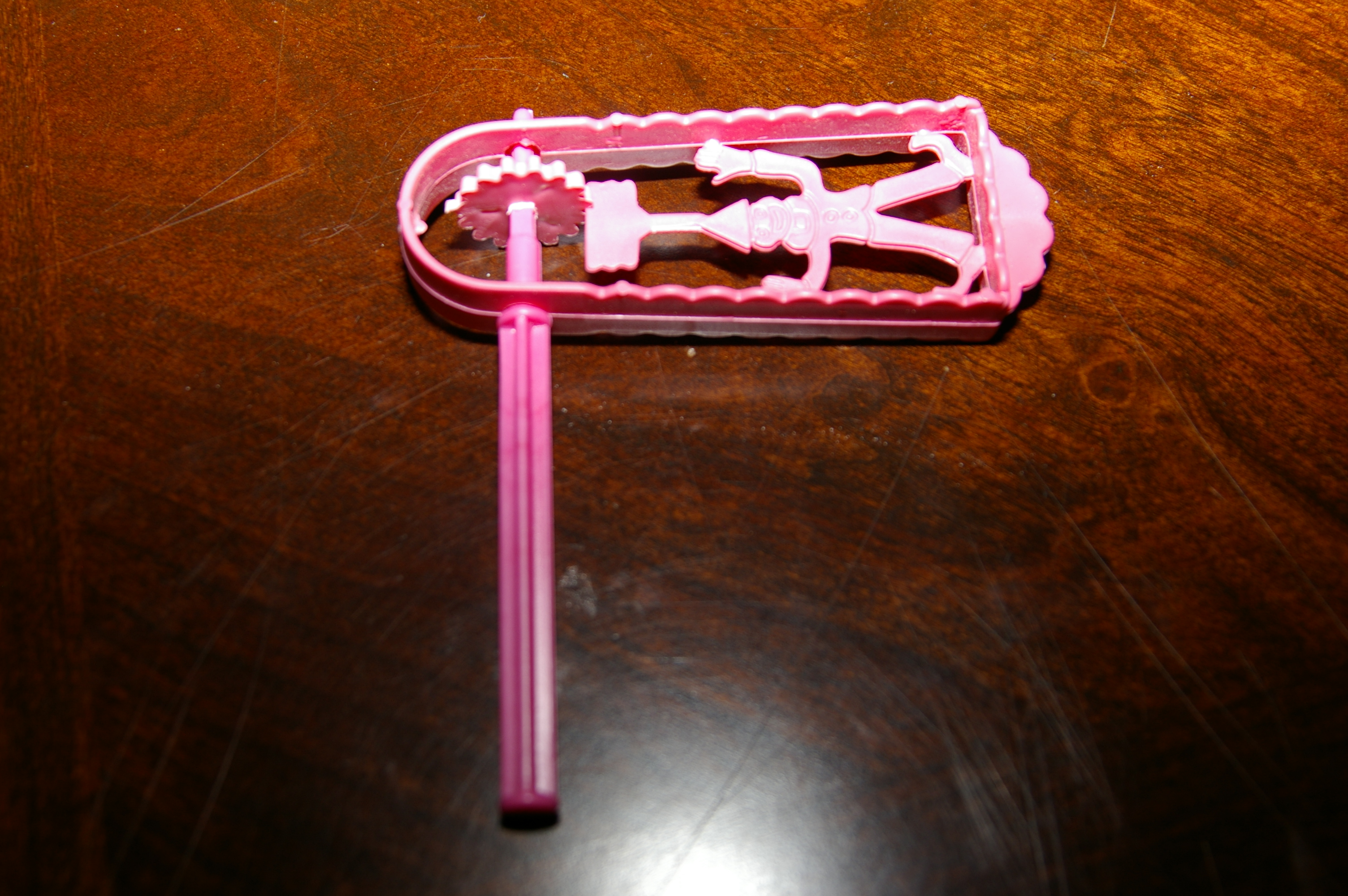
A plastic version of the gragger

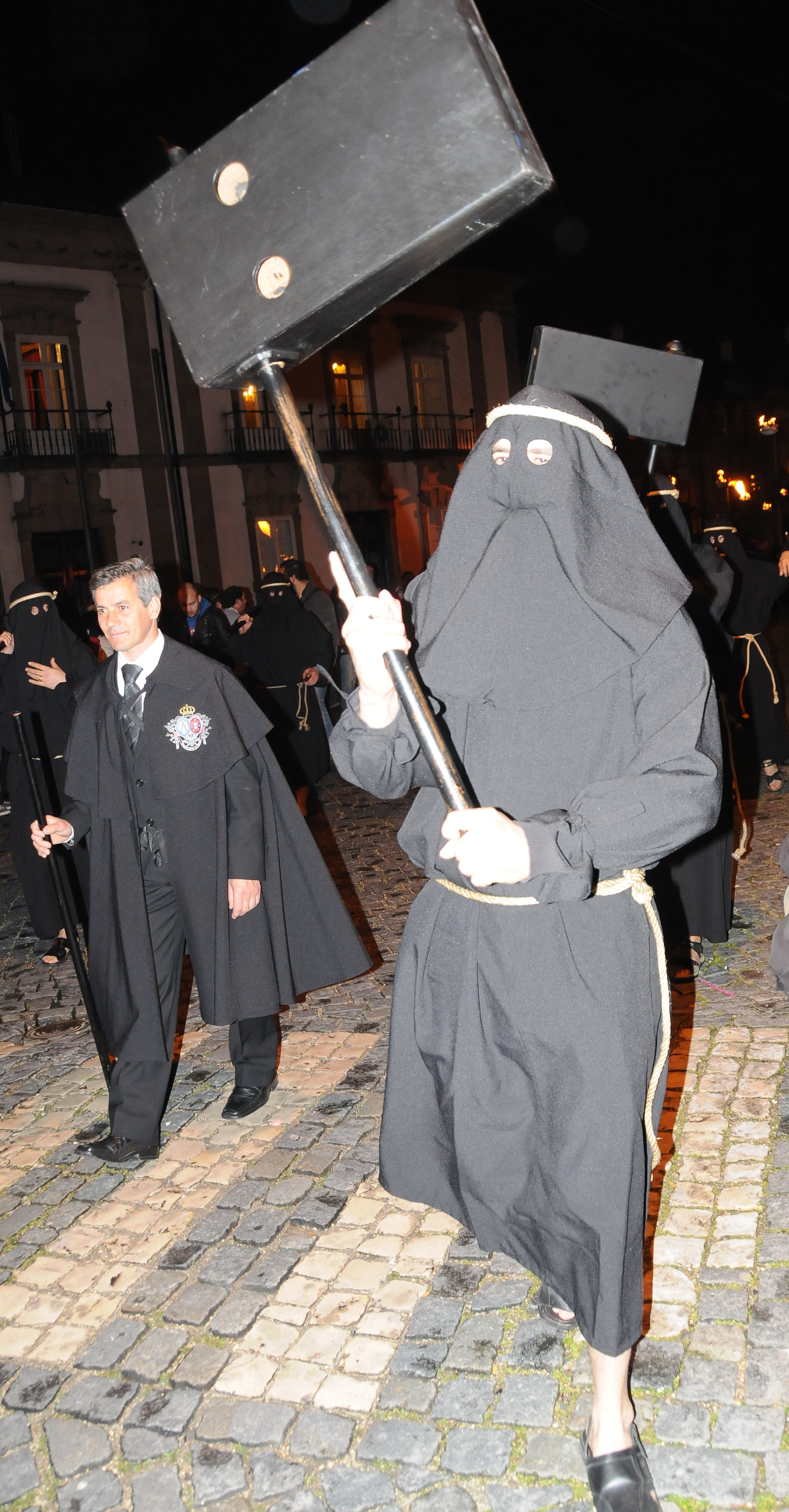
A ratchet used in a procession in Braga, Portugal

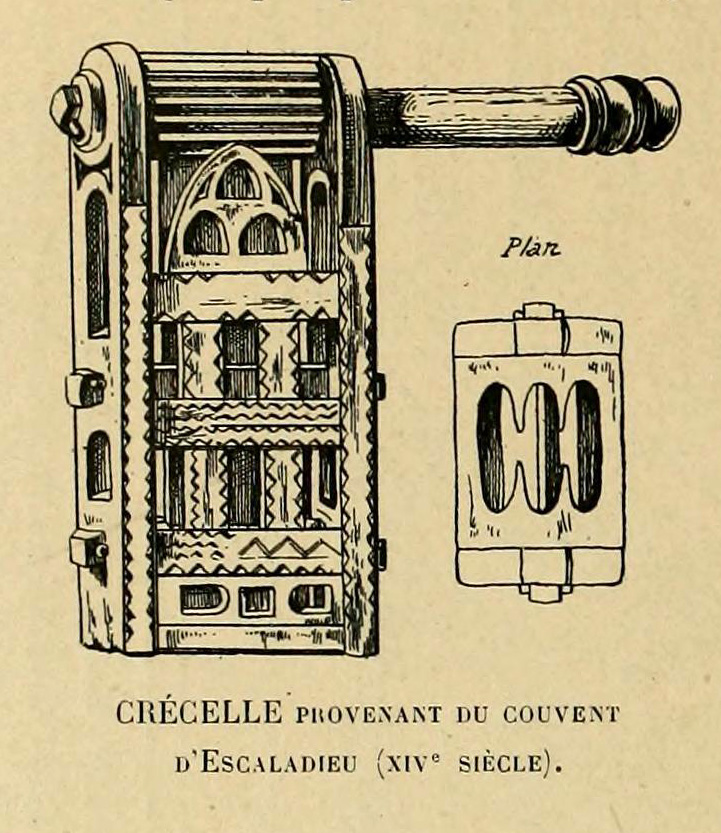
14th century French ratchet

== See also ==
- Ukrainian folk music
