= Rattle (percussion beater) =

Part of a percussion musical instrument

A rattle is a percussion beater that is attached to or enclosed by a percussion instrument so that motion of the instrument will cause the rattle to strike the instrument and create musical sound.

Examples include:

- The rivets of a sizzle cymbal.
- The jingles of a tambourine.
- The seeds inside a maraca.
- The ball chain of a cabasa.
- The snares of a snare drum.

Rattles may be the primary cause of the instrument's sound, as in the maraca, or they may modify its sound, as in the sizzle cymbal, or they may be used for both purposes depending on how it is played, as in the tambourine.

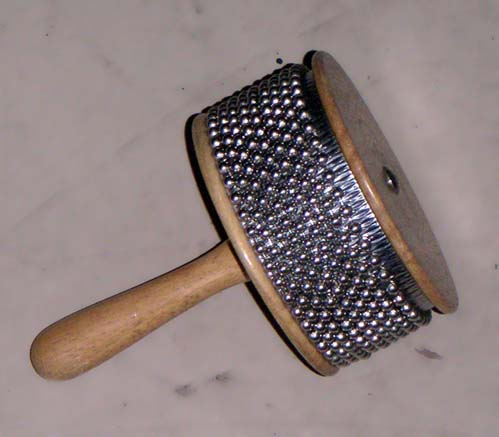
Ball chain surrounding the cabasa produces its sound when it is shaken

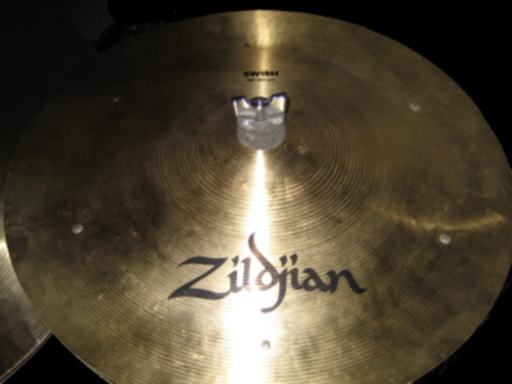
Rivets in a swish cymbal modify its sound

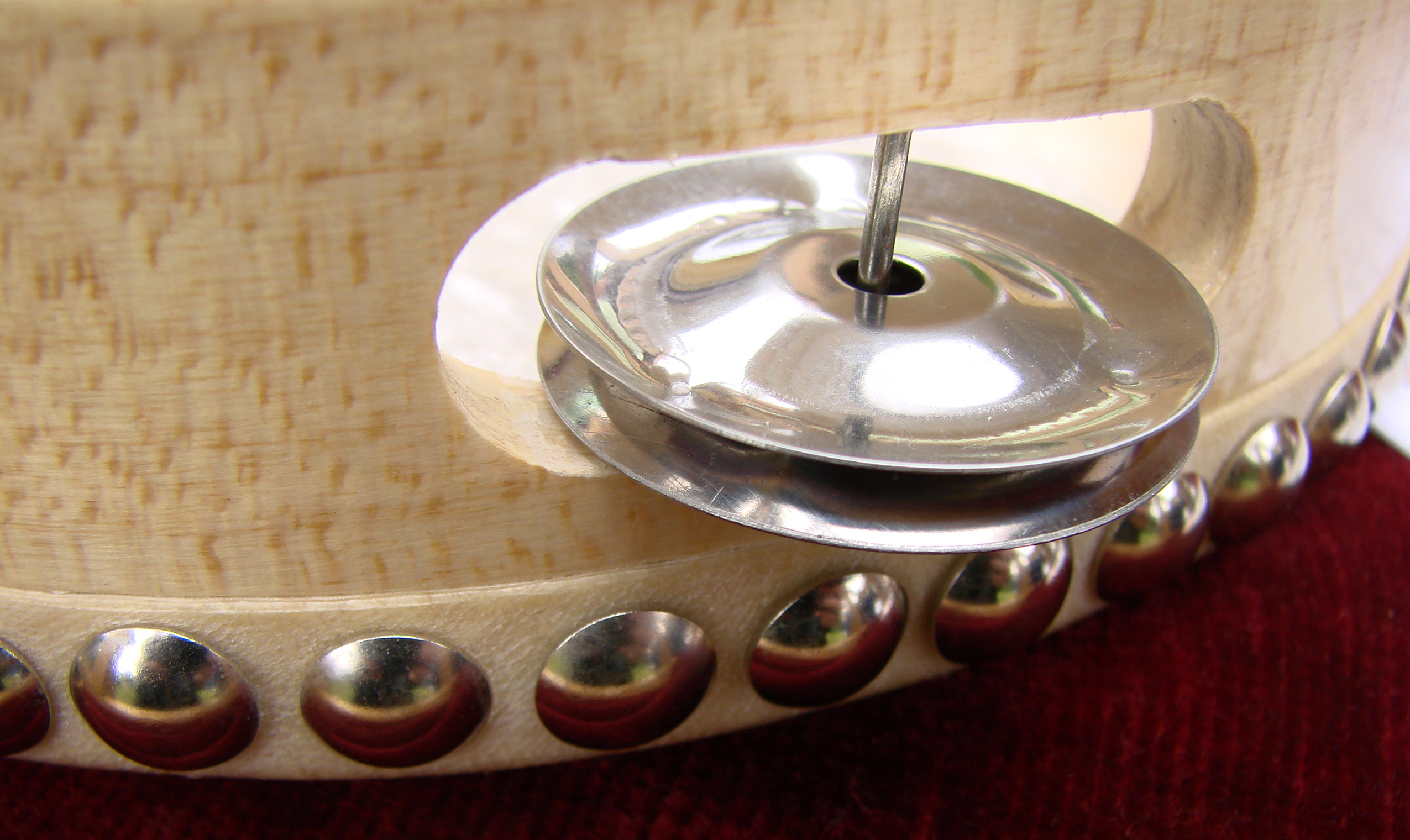
Tambourine jingles both sound when the tambourine is shaken and modify the sound of the hand beating the skin

== See also ==
- Rattle (percussion instrument)
- Rattle (disambiguation)
