= Altar bell =

Liturgical item in Christian Churches

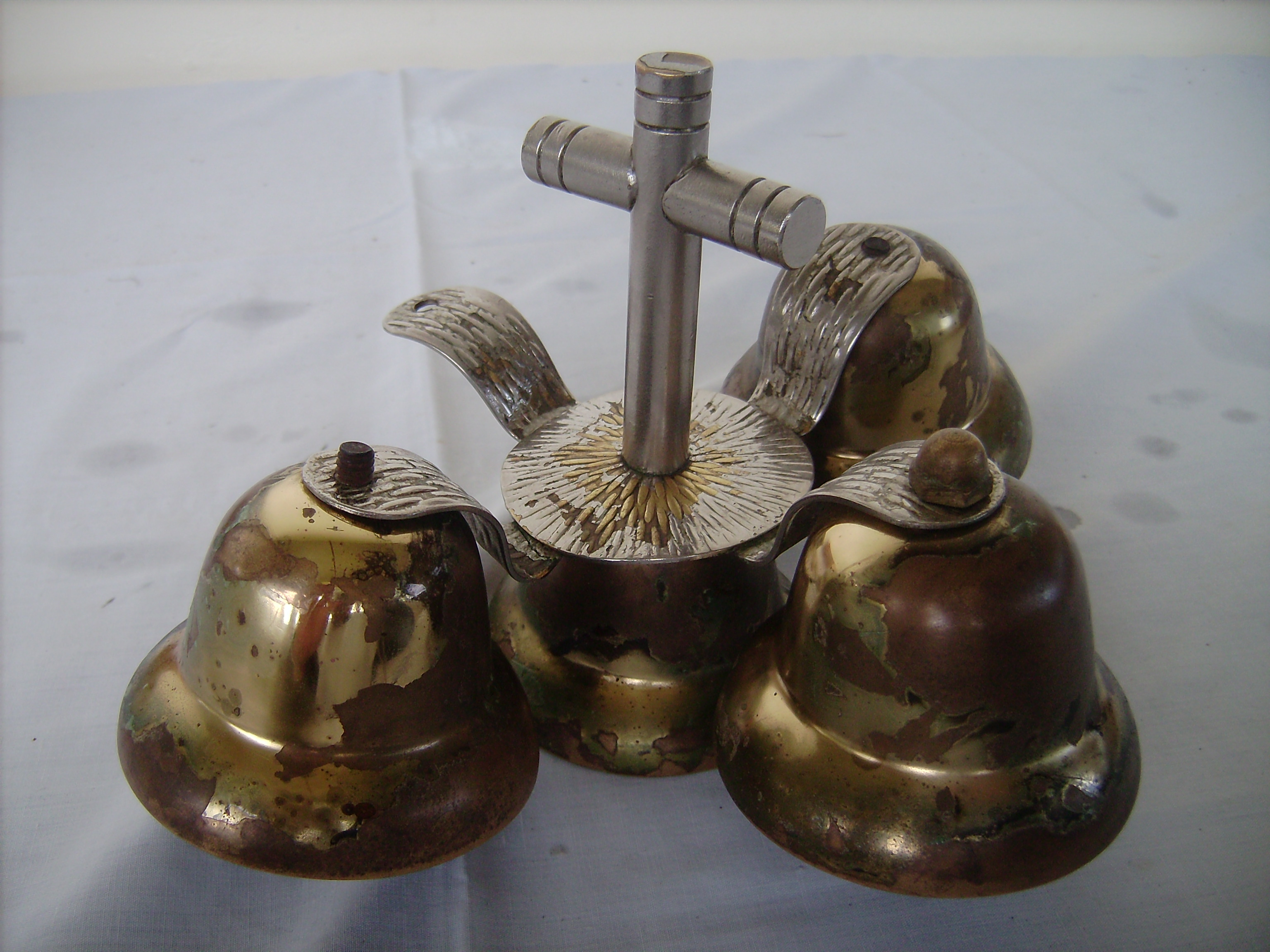
Altar bells (missing one bell), with cross-shaped handle

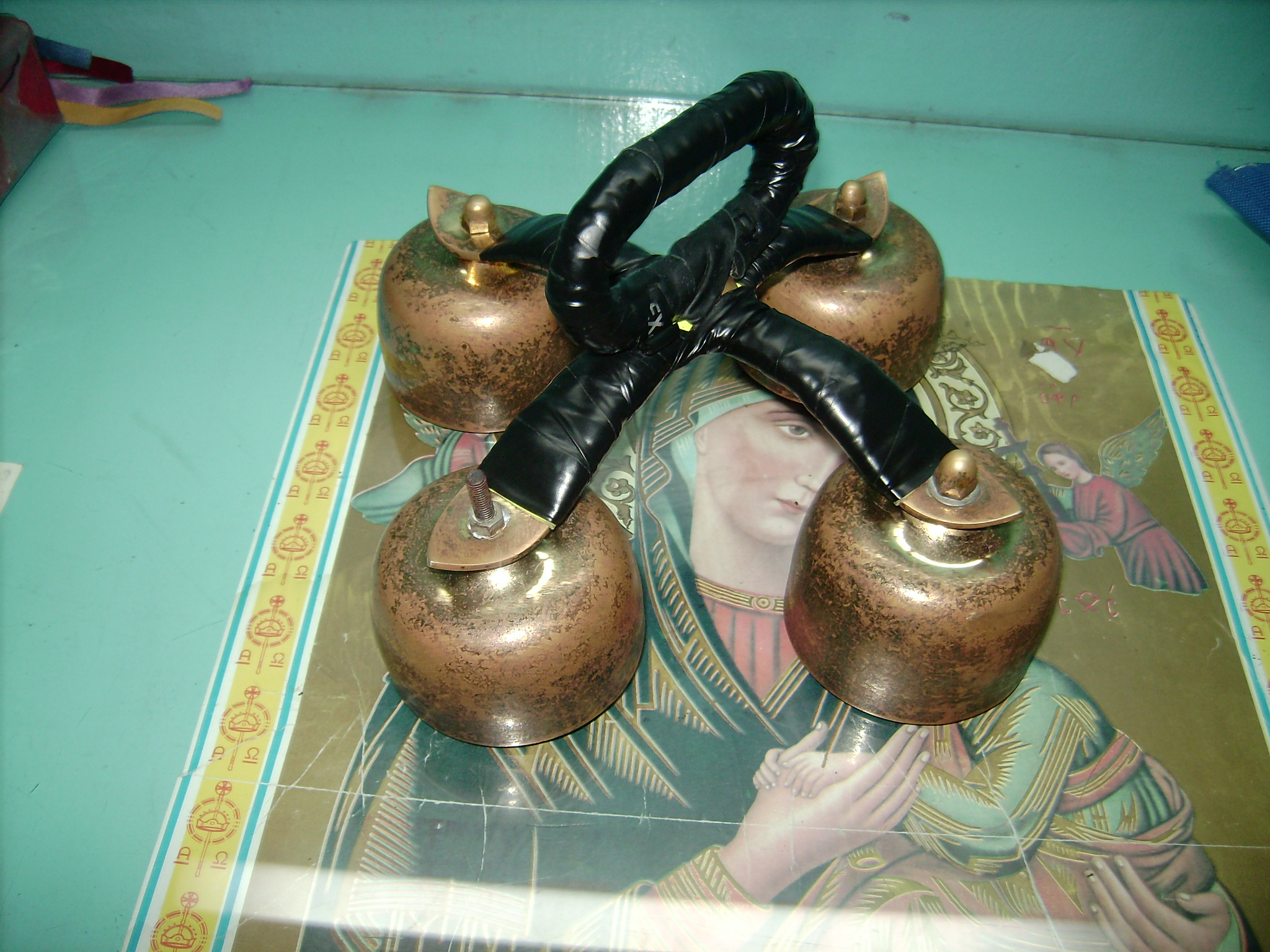
Altar bells

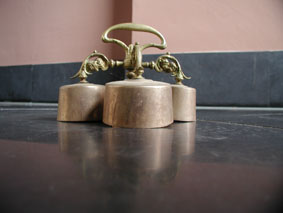
Sanctus bells

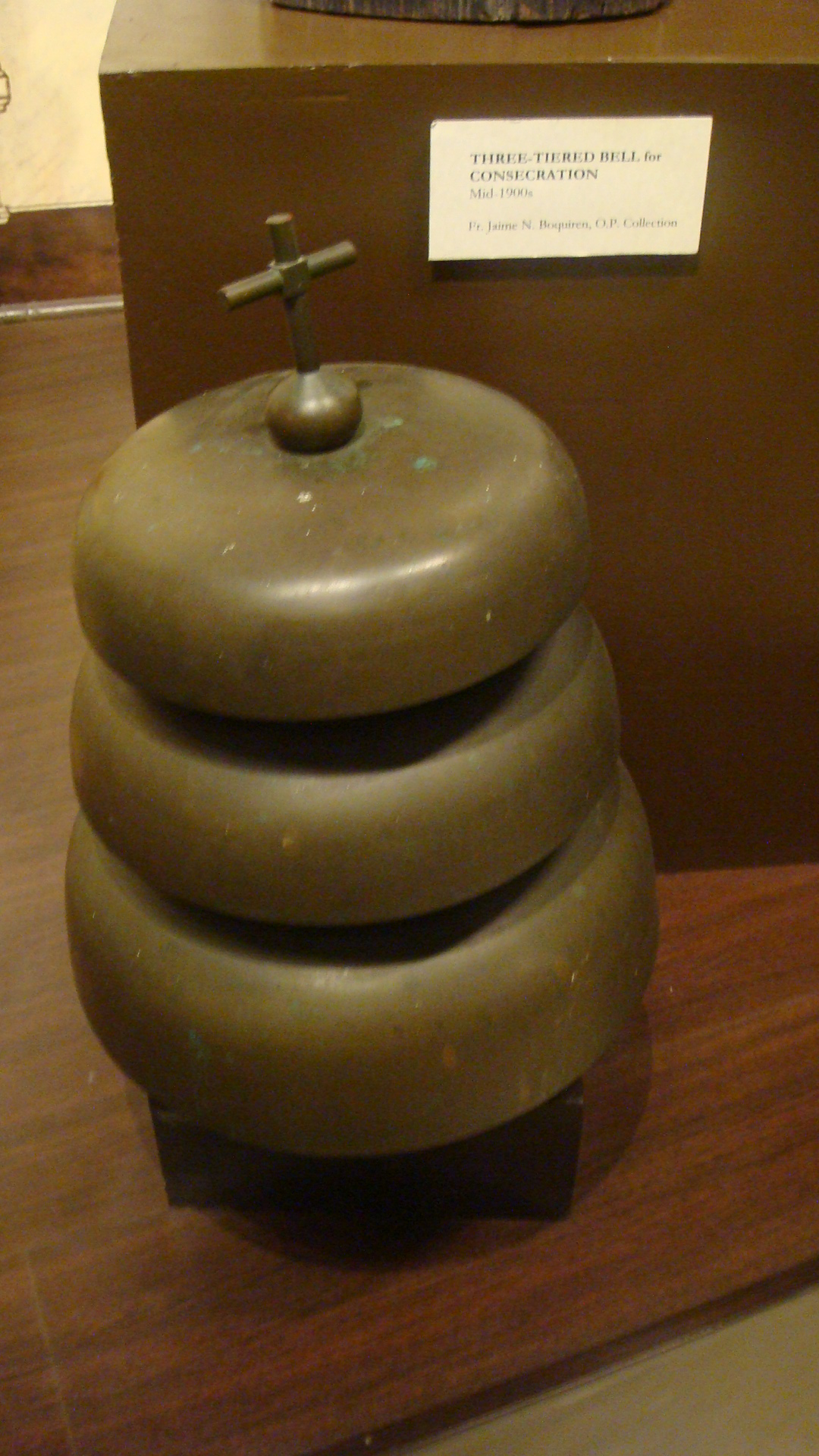
Mid-1900s three-tiered bell at the museum of Manaoag Basilica

In the Roman Rite of the Catholic Church, Lutheranism, and Anglicanism, an altar bell (also Mass bell, sacring bell, Sacryn bell, saints' bell, sance-bell, or sanctus bell) is typically a small hand-held bell or set of bells. The primary reason for the use of such bells is to create a "joyful noise to the Lord" as a way to give thanks for the miracle taking place atop the altar.

An ancillary function of the bells is to focus the attention of those attending Mass that a supernatural event is taking place on the altar. These are kept on the credence table or some other convenient location within the chancel.

The tradition of bell ringing during the consecration finds its historical roots in older forms of the Mass where much of the celebrant's dialogue was uttered in subdued tones. During the Middle Ages, the widespread use of rood screens often obstructed the view of the altar for many congregants, necessitating the need for auditory signals to denote significant moments within the Mass. Consequently, the ringing of bells emerged as a practical solution, effectively drawing attention to the solemn act of consecration.

While the original practical motivations for bell ringing may have diminished with time, the practice persists as an integral component of liturgical tradition. Its enduring presence serves a dual purpose: not only does it maintain continuity with historical practices, but it also functions as a subtle yet poignant reminder to worshipers, redirecting their focus towards the sacred altar and reinforcing the sanctity of the momentous proceedings unfolding before them.

== In the Catholic Church ==
=== At Mass ===
"A little before the Consecration, if appropriate, a minister rings a small bell as a signal to the faithful." The usual moment chosen for giving the signal of the approach of the Consecration is when the priest stretches out his hands over the host and the chalice while reciting the epiclesis. Mention of this signal was introduced into the Roman Missal in Pope John XXIII's 1962 revisions. Even before 1962, it was common practice to give this signal, although it then "ha[d] no authority".

All pre-1970 editions of the Roman Missal, including that of 1962, prescribe continuous ringing of the altar bell while the priest recites the words of the Sanctus at Low Mass. but, in line with its abolition of a hard and fast distinction between a sung and merely spoken Mass, the 1970 edition makes no mention of that practice.

According to local custom, the server also rings the bell once or three times as the priest elevates the consecrated Host and then the Chalice Pre-1970 editions of the Roman Missal prescribe either a triple or a continuous ringing of the bell at each showing of the consecrated species. Pre-1962 editions also prescribe that the server should first light an elevation candle, to be extinguished only after the priest has consumed the Precious Blood or has given Communion to any others who wish to receive it.

On 10 September 1898, the Congregation of Sacred Rites declared inappropriate the use of a gong instead of the altar bell.

The ringing of an altar bell began probably in the 13th century. It is not mentioned in the original 1570 Roman Missal of Pope Pius V and was not introduced into papal Masses until the reign of Pope John Paul II.

Before the reintroduction of concelebration, priests frequently said Mass at side altars while a public celebration was taking place at the high altar, so the Congregation of Sacred Rites found it necessary to prohibit ringing a bell at Masses celebrated at a side altar. The same rule was made even for a Solemn Mass celebrated at an altar other than one at which the Blessed Sacrament is publicly exposed, and allowed the ringing of the altar bell to be omitted when Mass was celebrated at the altar of exposition.

Like all church bells, the altar bell is not rung from the end of the Gloria in excelsis at the Mass of the Lord's Supper on Maundy Thursday until it is sung again at the Easter Vigil on Holy Saturday. During this holiest season of the liturgical year known as the Paschal Triduum, a wooden clapper known as a crotalus (crotalus/matraca; Latin: Crotalum, Crepitaculum) is sometimes used to make important sounds in place of the altar bell.

In some places it is local custom, but not mandated by liturgical law, to also refrain from using altar bells during the season of Advent. As with Easter, the bells are rung again throughout the Gloria at Midnight Mass on Christmas Eve to celebrate the resumption of their use.

=== Benediction ===
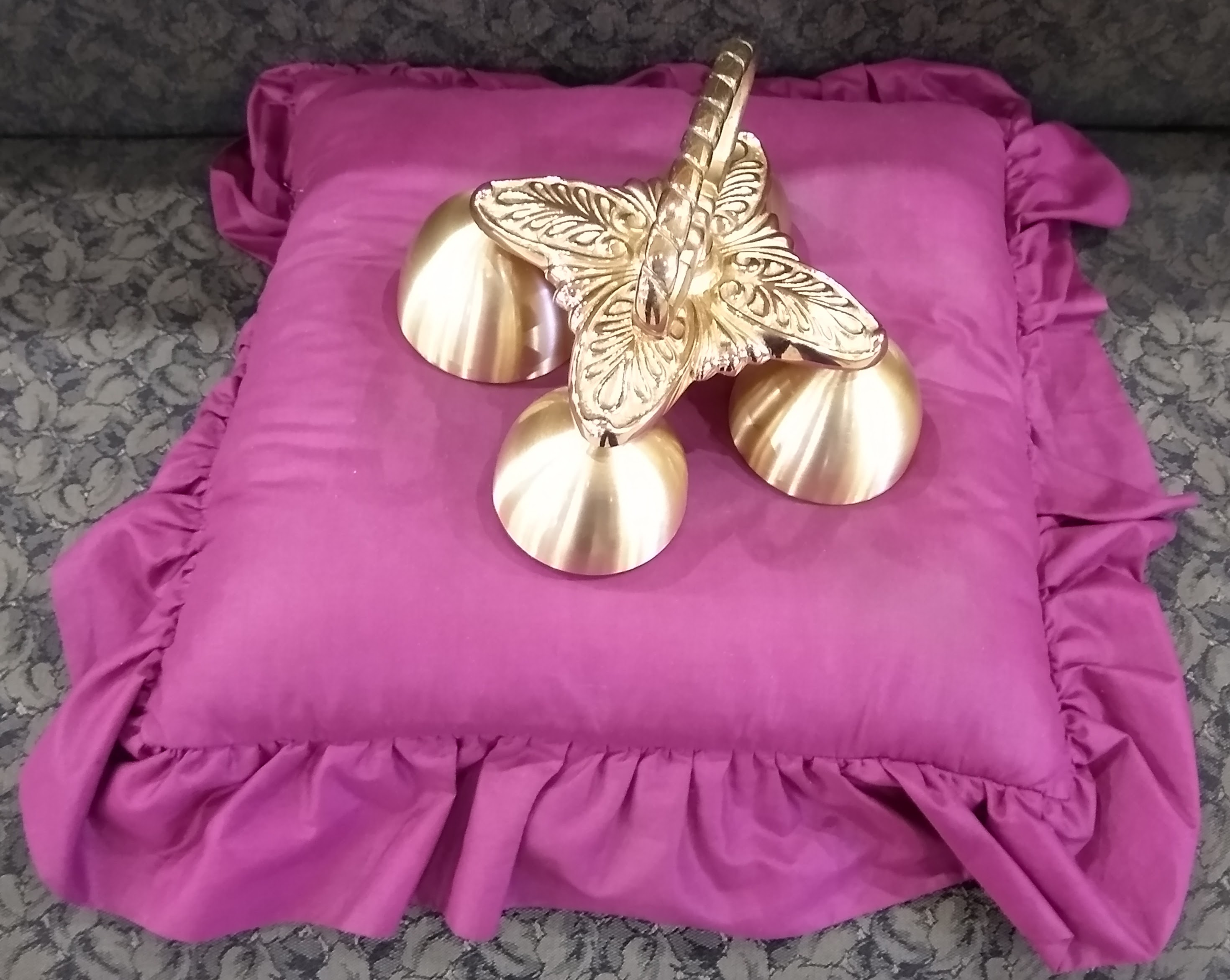
An altar bell used in a Catholic church in Florida

Bells may also be rung during Eucharistic adoration and benediction of the Blessed Sacrament.

== Lutheran ==
In branches of Lutheranism, altar bells are rung at the two appropriate times during the Words of Institution ("This is my body... This is the cup of my blood...") to signify the real presence.

== Anglican ==
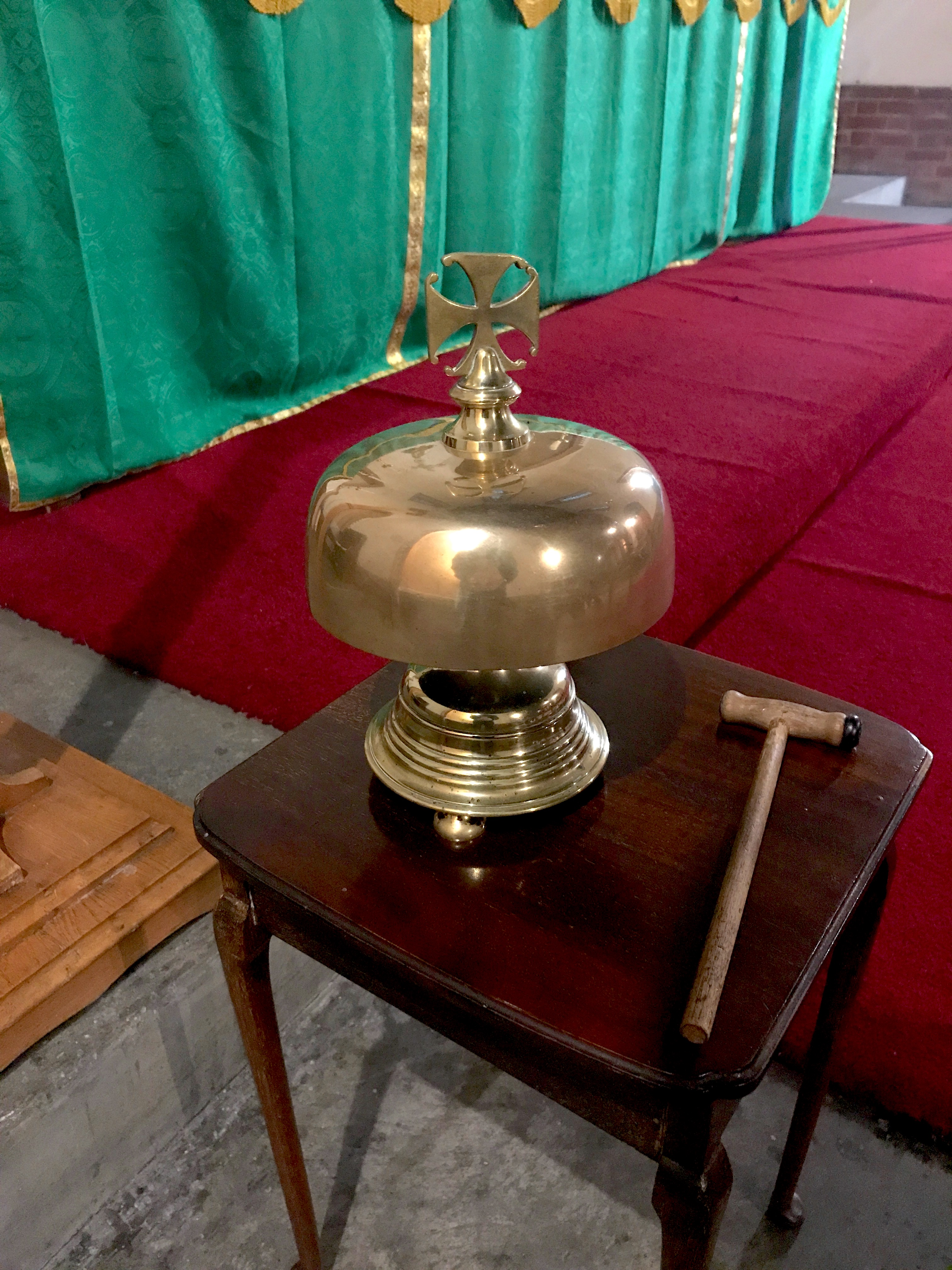
An altar gong and mallet, used as an alternative to the altar bell in some churches (especially in Anglo-Catholicism)

Some Anglican parishes, in particular those that are Anglo-Catholic, use an altar bell which is rung to signify the Real Presence of Christ in the sacred Elements. During the Eucharist, it is usually rung three times - once before the Words of Institution, and once at each elevation of the Host and of the Chalice. It may also be rung to indicate the time that the faithful may come forward to receive Communion when the priest drinks the wine from the chalice.

The bells are also rung when the monstrance or ciborium is exposed or processed, for example when moving the reserved Sacrament from a side altar to the high altar. Custom differs concerning its use at Low Mass, or during Lent and Holy Week.

In some churches, particularly in the Anglo-Catholic tradition, a large (and sometimes decorated) gong, struck with a mallet, may be used during the celebration of mass as an alternative to the altar bell.
