= Baby rattle =

Toy for infants

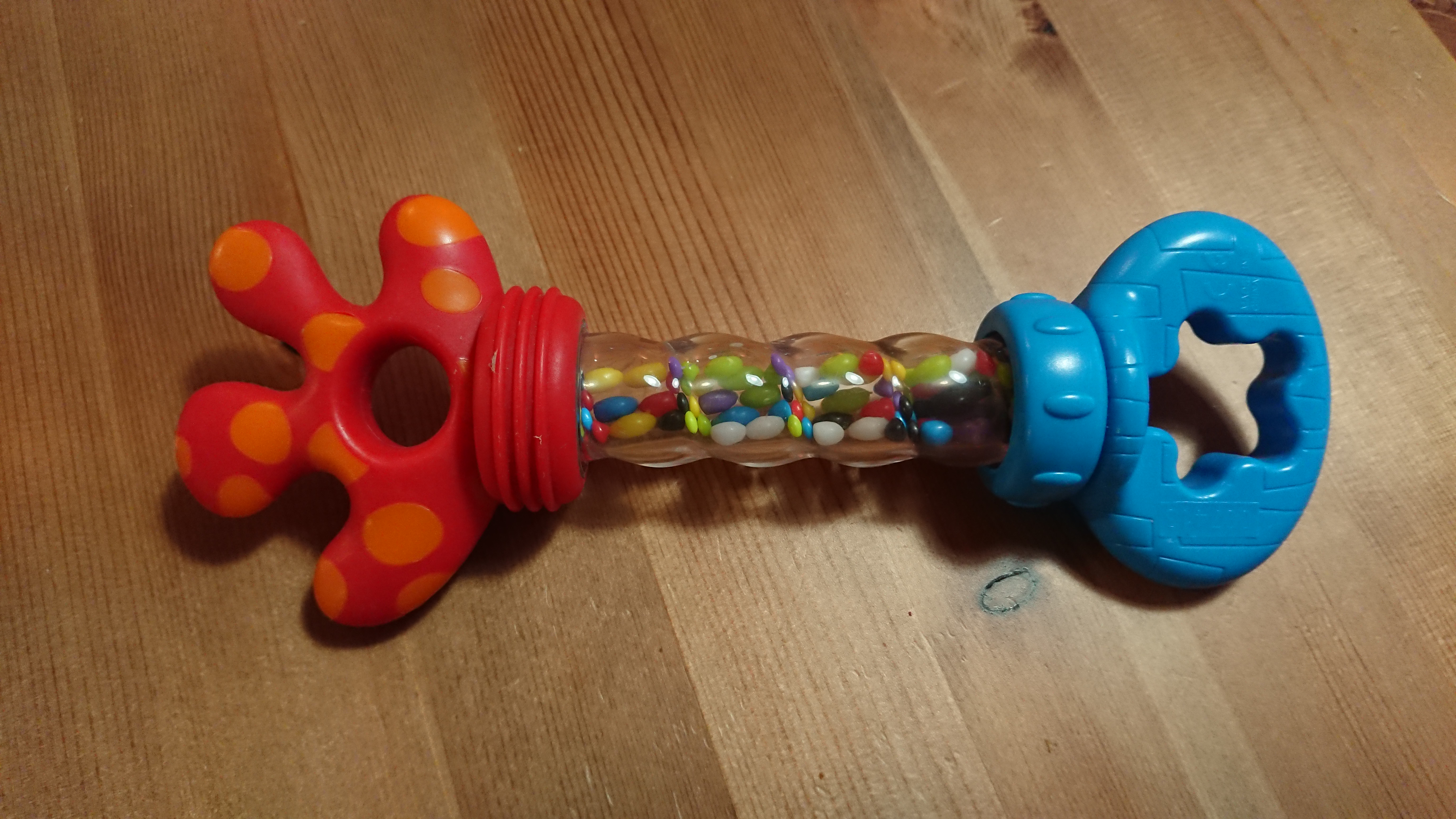
A modern plastic baby rattle

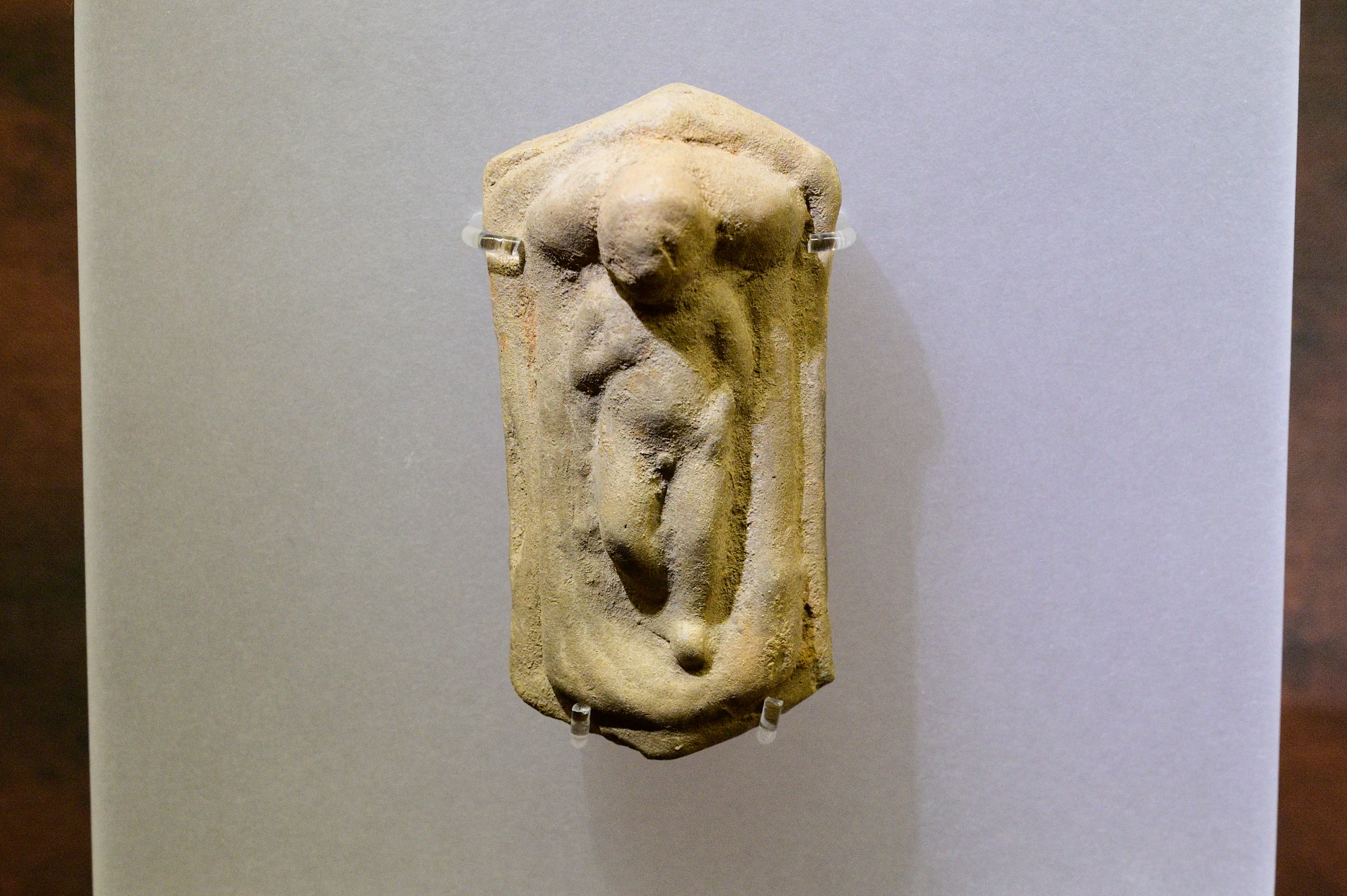
Rattle in the shape of a child's bed, 3rd century BC, in the collection of the Goulandris Museum of Cycladic Art

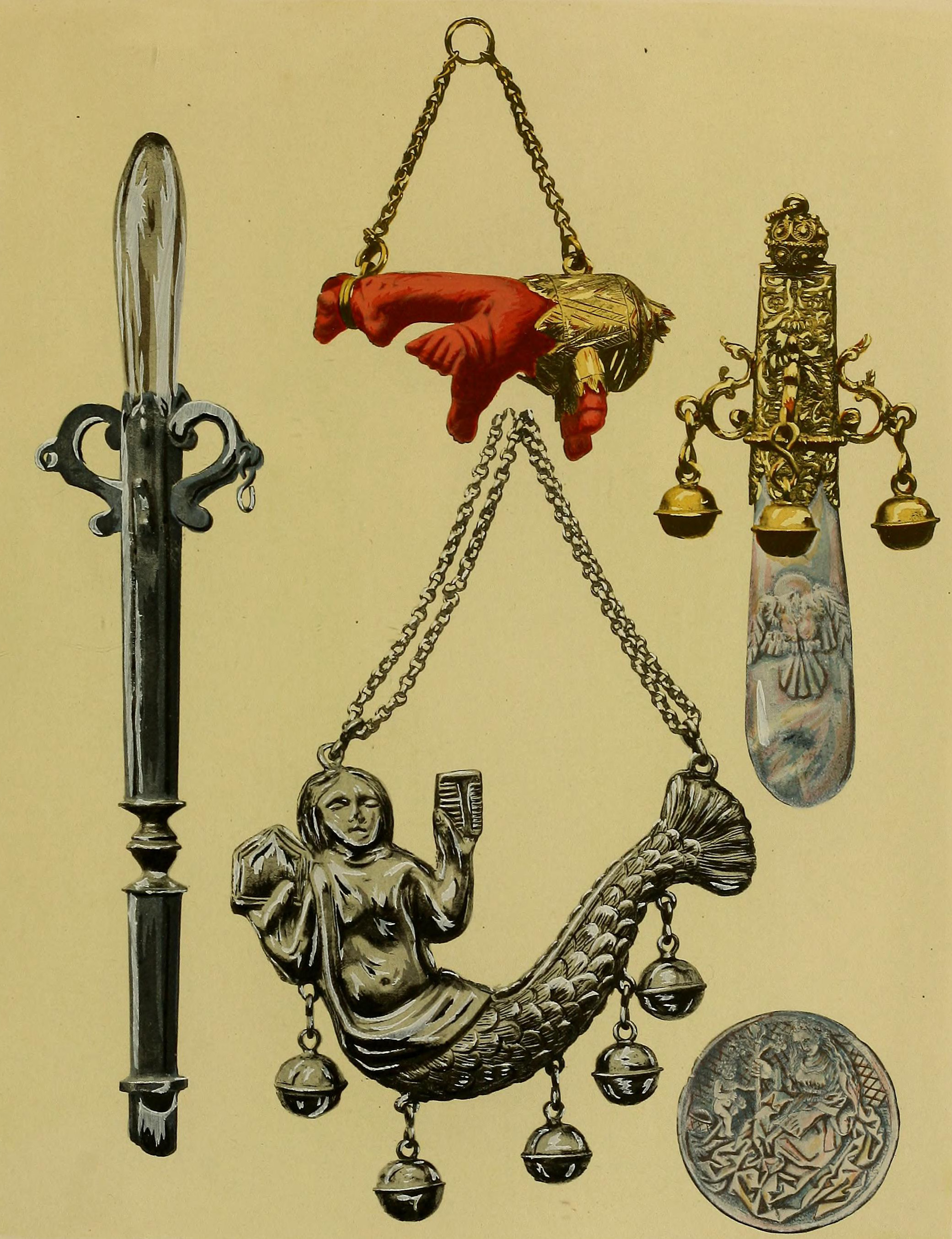
16th and 17th century toy rattles.

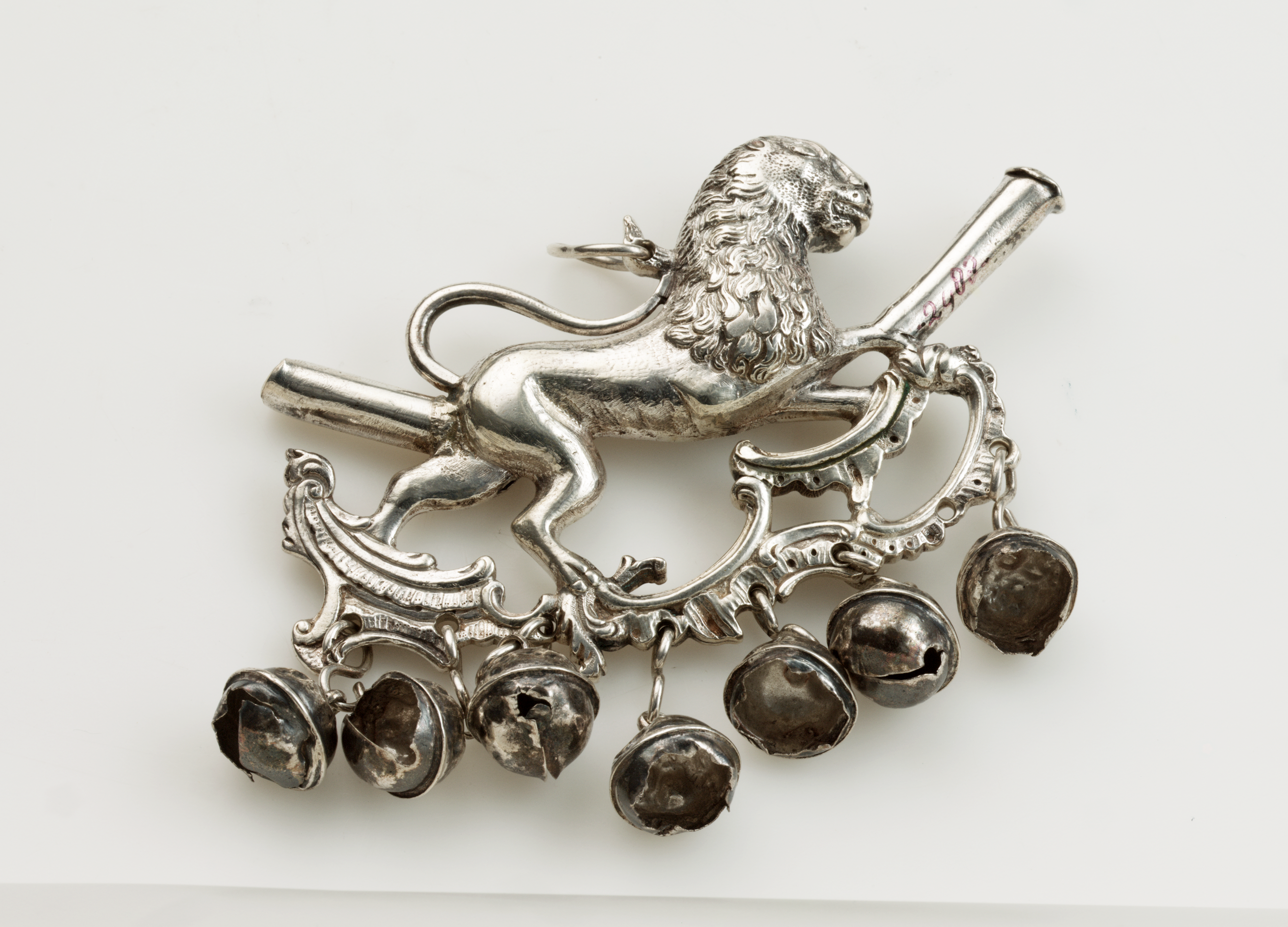
An 18th century silver baby rattle in the shape of a lion passant. In the collection of the Zuiderzee Museum in the Netherlands

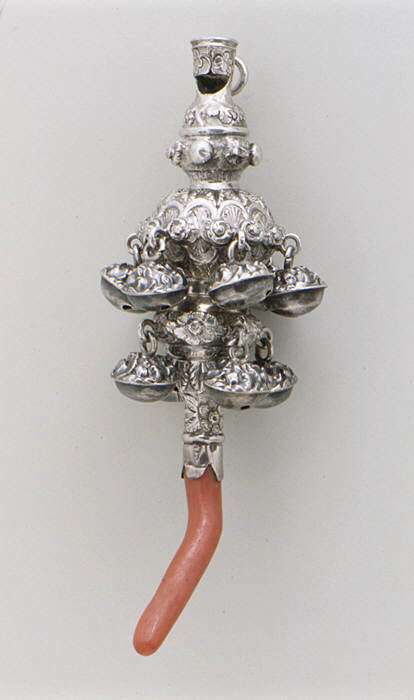
Early 19th century silver child's rattle and coral teether, in the collection of the Metropolitan Museum of Art. British, imported to the United States. Original ownership attributed to the daughter of Duncan Phyfe.

A baby rattle is a rattle produced specifically for the amusement of an infant. Rattles have been used for this purpose since antiquity, and experts in child development believe they help the infant improve hand-eye coordination by stimulating their senses.

== History ==
Baby rattles go back at least 2500 years. A rattle made of clay was found in Poland in a grave of a baby who was a member of the early Iron Age Lusatian culture, and was documented by archaeologists. That hollow clay rattle was shaped like a pillow and was filled with little balls. It was found next to a tiny urn containing the cremated remains of the baby. Many similar examples of baby rattles have been recovered from Greco-Roman archaeological sites. Often, these rattles were in the shape of a pig or a boar, and sometimes a figure of a baby was riding the animal. Pigs were associated with the Greek goddess Demeter, who was invoked in rituals intended to protect babies in life and death.

Greek philosopher Aristotle says in his Politics that young children should be given a rattle (particularly one designed by Archytas of Taranto) to keep them quiet and "stop them from breaking things in the house".

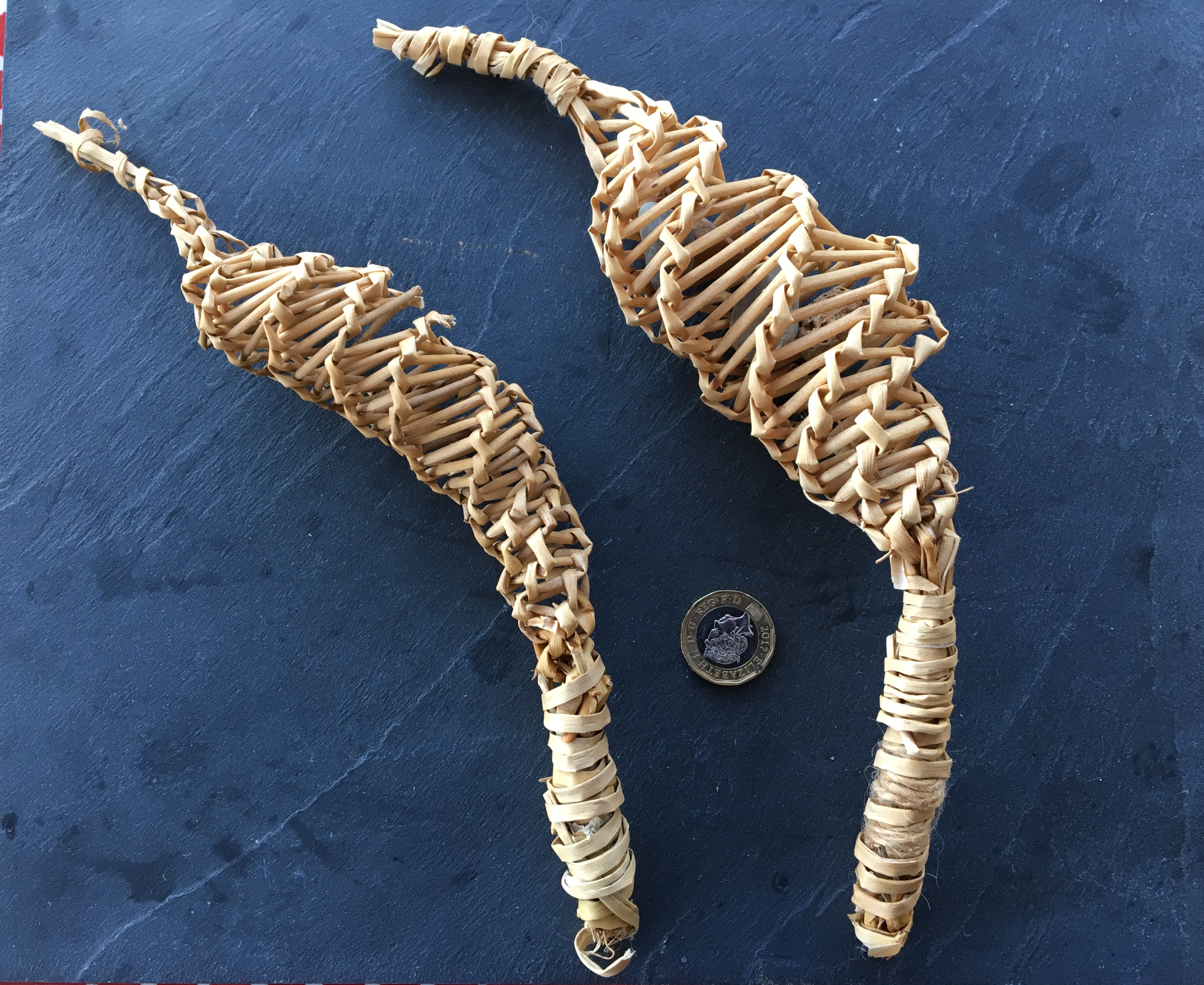
'Morthwyl sinc' or 'Ragyrud', an ancient Welsh weaving practice of a child's rattle made out of rushes or sedge.

In Celtic cultures, it was common practice to produce toys out of rushes, much like how Brigid's cross are made in Irish culture, Morthwyl sinc (or 'Rygarug') are produced by the Welsh, they are woven by hand and teeth into a cocoon shaped encasing, inside there would be pebbles or possibly dried seeds to produce the rattling sound.

In colonial America, artisans made elaborate gold and silver baby rattles incorporating bells and whistles and teething devices made of coral. In 1777, in the early days of the American Revolution, John Hancock wrote to his wife, Dorothy Quincy Hancock saying, "I have sent everywhere to get a gold or silver rattle for the child, with a coral to send, but cannot get one." Their daughter Lydia later died at ten months of age.

Edith Wharton, who was born during the American Civil War, received a similar elaborate silver baby rattle as an infant, which was engraved with her name and had a coral teething extension.

== Modern rattles ==
Rattles can be made of wood, plastic or cloth. Many of the rattles are brightly colored, have animal or flower shapes, and typically make sounds when shaken. These sounds can range from the dull sounds typical of wooden rattles to the jingling or bell type sounds that metal rattles make.

Rattles provide a source of stimulation. Babies like the sounds they produce and follow the path of the rattle with their eyes, as well as giving them a sense of discovery as they try to grab and hold the rattle.

Many rattles have a dual function, doubling as teethers as babies grow. They have textured surfaces which are easy on the gums and provide the stimulation that babies need.
