= Chime =

Chimes are a percussion instrument, sets of bells in varying pitches.

These include:

- Chime (bell instrument), an array of large bells, typically housed in a tower and played from a keyboard
- Cymbalum or cymbala, word from which chimes derives, used for Greek and medieval instruments
- Chimes, the sounds produced by a striking clock to announce the hours
- Bar chimes (also known as "mark tree"), a series of many small chimes of decreasing length, arranged horizontally
- Bianzhong, chime bell sets from China, oldest sets are about 2,000 and 3,600 years old
- Carillon, larger set of tower-mounted bells, played musically
- Chime bars, individual instruments similar to glockenspiel bars but with resonators
- Gong chime, wracks of pot-gongs, traditional to Southeast Asia
- Lithophone or stone chimes, musical instruments made of rock
- Tubular bells, orchestral instrument, modern chimes in the form of metal tubes
- Wind chime or Aeolian chime, suspended bells sounded when blown together by the wind
- Handchimes, an instrument that is rung by hand, similar to handbells.

Chime or chimes may also refer to:

== Places ==
- Chimes, Arkansas, a community in the United States

== People ==
- Chime (musician) (born 1994), English dubstep musician
- Terry Chimes (born 1956), English musician
- Chime Rinpoche (born 1941), Tibetan Buddhist Lama and Tulku
- Chime Tulku (born 1991), Buddhist Tulku

== Acronyms ==
- Canadian Hydrogen Intensity Mapping Experiment, a radio telescope
- College of Healthcare Information Management Executives, the professional organization for chief information officers and other senior healthcare IT leaders
- CHIME syndrome, a rare combination of congenital birth defects

== Arts, entertainment, and media ==
=== Albums ===
- Chime (Yuki Saito album), 1986
- Chime (Dessa album), 2018
- Chimes EP, 2014 EP by Hudson Mohawke

=== Songs ===
- "Chime" (Orbital song), a 1989 single release by Orbital
- "Chimes" (song), a 2014 single release by Hudson Mohawke
- "Chime" (Ai Otsuka song), a 2019 single release by Ai Otsuka

=== Other arts, entertainment, and media ===
- Chime (film), a 2024 Japanese film by Kiyoshi Kurosawa
- Chime (novel), a 2011 young adult novel by Franny Billingsley
- Chime (video game), released in 2010
- Chimes (Gavrilin), a Russian-language choral work by Valery Gavrilin that premiered in 1984
- Chimes, a magical force that paradoxically destroys magic in the novel Soul of the Fire by Terry Goodkind

== Other uses ==
- Chime (company), an American financial technology company
- Chime, the rim of a barrel, one at each end
- Macintosh startup chime, the sound a Macintosh computer makes on startup
- MDL Chime, a plugin used by web browsers to display the 3D structure of molecules
- Warning chime, a sound used in machinery or computers to alert users of a dangerous condition, error, completion of a process, etc.

== See also ==
- Chime Communications (disambiguation)
- Chimera (disambiguation)
- Chyme, human body digestive fluid
- The Chimes (disambiguation)
