= List of tuned and untuned percussion instruments =

This is a partitioned list of percussion instruments showing their usage as tuned or untuned. See pitched percussion instrument for discussion of the differences between tuned and untuned percussion. The term pitched percussion is now preferred to the traditional term tuned percussion:

Each list is alphabetical.

== Instruments normally used as tuned percussion ==
This group of instruments includes all keyboard percussion and mallet percussion instruments and nearly all melodic percussion instruments. Those three groups are themselves overlapping, having many instruments in common.

- Angklung
- Celesta
- Chime bar
- Cup chime
- Glockenspiel
- Hand chime
- Marimba
- Metallophone
- Piano
- Steel pan
- Tubular bells
- Timpani
- Vibraphone
- Xylophone

== Instruments normally used as untuned percussion ==
- Agogo bells
- Bass drum
- Bongo drum
- Cabasa
- Castanets
- Claves
- Conga
- Cymbal
- Djembe
- Flexatone
- Gong
- Guiro
- Jingle bell (sleigh bell)
- Maracas
- Snare drum
- Tam-tam
- Tambourine
- Timbales
- Tom drum
- Vibraslap
- Waterphone
- Woodblock

== Instruments commonly used in both roles ==
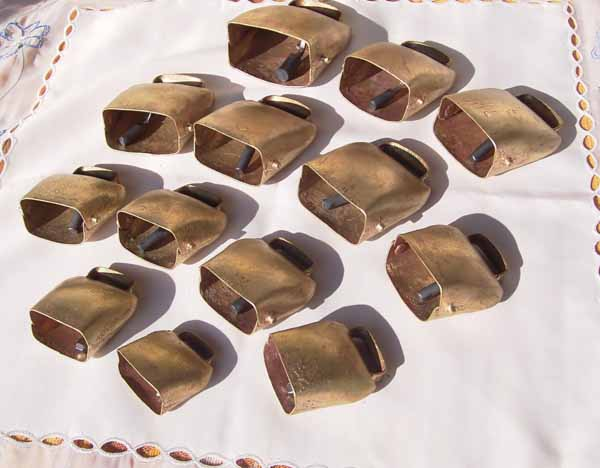
A set of tuned cowbells

- Bell
- Crotales
- Cowbell
- Hand bell
- Octoban
- Rototom
- Temple block
- Triangle

== See also ==
- Pitched percussion instrument
- Category:Pitched percussion instruments
- Indefinite pitch
- Tuning in untuned percussion
- Tuning a drum set
