= Pema Chödrön bibliography =

This is a list of works published by Pema Chödrön (born 1936), buddhist nun and student of Chögyam Trungpa Rinpoche. An author and acharya, Chödrön was a senior teacher of the Shambhala Buddhist lineage Trungpa founded. She has been the resident teacher and founding director of Gampo Abbey in Nova Scotia since 1984.

== Books by Pema Chödrön ==
- The Wisdom of No Escape And the Path of Loving-Kindness (1991, Shambhala Publications, ISBN 978-1-57062-872-6)
- Start Where You Are: A Guide to Compassionate Living (1994, Shambhala Publications, ISBN 978-1-57062-839-9)
- Awakening Loving-Kindness (abridged Wisdom of No Escape) (1996, English Import, ISBN 978-1-57062-259-5) (Note: This is an abridged version of The Wisdom of No Escape according to this book's preface)
- When Things Fall Apart: Heart Advice for Difficult Times (1996, Shambhala Publications, ISBN 978-1-57062-344-8)
- The Places That Scare You: A Guide To Fearlessness (2001, Shambhala Publications, ISBN 978-1-57062-921-1)
- Tonglen: The Path of Transformation (2001, Shambhala Publications, ISBN 978-3-92419-573-1)
- Comfortable With Uncertainty: 108 Teachings (2002, Shambhala Publications, ISBN 978-1-59030-078-7)
- Hooked! Buddhist Writings on Greed, Desire, and the Urge to Consume (2005, Shambhala Publications, ISBN 978-1-59030-172-2)
- No Time to Lose: A Timely Guide to the Way of the Bodhisattva (2005, Shambhala Publications, ISBN 978-1-59030-424-2)
- Practicing Peace in Times of War (2006, Shambhala Publications, ISBN 978-1-59030-500-3)
- Don't Bite the Hook: Finding Freedom From Anger and Other Destructive Emotions (2007, Shambhala Publications, ISBN 978-1-59030-434-1)
- Always Maintain a Joyful Mind And Other Lojong Teachings on Awakening Compassion and Fearlessness (2007, Shambhala Publications, ISBN 978-1-59030-460-0)
- This Moment is the Perfect Teacher: 10 Buddhist Teachings on Cultivating Inner Strength and Compassion (2008, Shambhala Publications, ISBN 978-1-59030-493-8)
- The Pocket Pema Chodron (2008, Shambhala Publications, ISBN 978-1-59030-651-2)
- Taking the Leap: Freeing Ourselves From Old Habits and Fears (2009, Shambhala Publications, ISBN 978-1-59030-634-5)
- Living Beautifully With Uncertainty and Change (2012, Shambhala Publications, ISBN 978-1-59030-963-6)
- Fail, Fail Again, Fail Better: Wise Advice for Leaning into the Unknown (2015, Sounds True Publications, ISBN 978-1-62203-531-1)
- The Compassion Book: Teachings For Awakening The Heart (2017, Shambhala Publications, ISBN 978-1-61180-420-1)
- Welcoming the Unwelcome: Wholehearted Living in a Brokenhearted World (2019, Shambhala Publications, ISBN 978-1-61180-565-9)
- How We Live is How We Die (2022, Shambhala Publications, ISBN 978-1-61180-924-4)
- Another Kind of Freedom: A Students Commentary on The Myth of Freedom and The Way of Meditation by Chögyum Trungpa (2026, Shambhala Publications, ISBN 978-1-64547-326-8)

== Audio books by Pema Chödrön ==
- Awakening Compassion: Meditation Practice for Difficult Times, 6 cd (1995, Sounds True, ISBN 978-1-59179-128-7)
- Awakening Love: Teachings and Practices to Cultivate a Limitless Heart, 8 cd (2012, Sounds True, ISBN 978-1-60407-665-3)
- Bodhisattva Mind: Teachings to Cultivate Courage and Awareness in the Midst of Suffering, 7 cd (2006, Sounds True, ISBN 978-1-59179-535-3)
- Coming Closer to Ourselves: Making Everything the Path of Awakening, 5 cd (2012, Sounds True, ISBN 978-1-60407-794-0)
- Don't Bite the Hook, 3 cd (2007, Shambhala Audio, ISBN 978-1-59030-434-1)
- Fully Alive: A Retreat with Pema Chödrön on Living Beautifully With Uncertainty and Change, 4 cd (2012, Shambhala Publications, ISBN 978-1-61180-031-9)
- From Fear to Fearlessness: Teachings on the Four Great Catalysts of Awakening, 2 cd (2003, Sounds True, ISBN 978-1-59179-108-9)
- Getting Unstuck: Breaking Your Habitual Patterns and Encountering Naked Reality, 3 cd (2005, Sounds True, ISBN 978-1-59179-238-3)
- Giving Our Best: A Retreat With Pema Chödrön on Practicing the Way of the Bodhisattva, 4 cd (2014, Shambhala Publications, ISBN 978-1-61180-161-3)
- Good Medicine: How to Turn Pain Into Compassion With Tonglen Meditation, 2 cd (2001, Sounds True, ISBN 978-1-56455-846-6)
- How to Meditate: A Practical Guide to Making Friends With Your Mind, 5 cd (2007, Sounds True, ISBN 978-1-59179-794-4)
- In Conversation: On the Meaning of Suffering and the Mystery of Joy, (2005, Sounds True, ISBN 978-1-59179-392-2)
- Karma: Finding Freedom in This Moment, 2 cd (2013, Sounds True, ISBN 978-1-60407-934-0)
- Natural Awareness: Guided Meditations and Teachings for Welcoming All Experience, 4 cd (2011, Sounds True, ISBN 978-1-60407-435-2)
- No Time to Lose: A Timely Guide to the Way of the Bodhisattva, 10 cd (2013, Shambhala Publications, ISBN 978-1-61180-035-7)
- Noble Heart: A Self-Guided Retreat on Befriending Your Obstacles, 12 cd (1998, Sounds True, ISBN 978-1-59179-230-7)
- Practicing Peace in Times of War, 2 cd (2014, Shambhala Publications, ISBN 978-1-59030-414-3)
- Pure Meditation: The Tibetan Buddhist Practice Of Inner Peace, 2 cd (2004, Sounds True, ISBN 978-1-59179-262-8)
- Smile at Fear: A Retreat with Pema Chödrön on Discovering Your Radiant Self-Confidence, 4 cd (2014, Shambhala Publications, ISBN 978-1-59030-952-0)
- The Pema Chödrön Collection, 6 cd (2004, Sounds True, ISBN 978-1-59179-159-1)
- The Three Commitments: Walking the Path of Liberation, 7 cd (2010, Sounds True, ISBN 978-1-59179-775-3)
- The Truth of Our Existence: Four Teachings from the Buddha to Illuminate Your Life, 4 cd (2014, Sounds True, ISBN 978-1-62203-124-5)
- True Happiness, 6 cd (2006, Sounds True, ISBN 978-1-59179-244-4)
- Unconditional Confidence For Meeting Any Experience With Trust and Courage, 2 cd (2009, Boulder, ISBN 978-1-59179-746-3)
- Walking the Walk: Putting the Teachings Into Practice When it Matters Most, 4 cd (2014, Sounds True, ISBN 978-1-62203-358-4)
- When Pain is the Doorway: Awakening in the Most Difficult Circumstances, 2 cd (2013, Sounds True, ISBN 978-1-60407-970-8)
- The Courage to Love the World: Discovering Compassion, Strength, and Joy Through Tonglen Meditation, 2 cd (2018, Sounds True, ISBN 978-1-68364-141-4)

== DVDs by Pema Chödrön ==
- Fully Alive: A Retreat with Pema Chödrön on Living Beautifully With Uncertainty and Change, DVD (2012, Shambhala Publications, ISBN 978-1-61180-027-2)
- Giving Our Best: A Retreat With Pema Chödrön on Practicing the Way of the Bodhisattva, DVD (2014, Shambhala Publications, ISBN 978-1-61180-162-0)
- Good Medicine: How to Turn Pain Into Compassion With Tonglen Meditation, 2 DVD (2001, Sounds True, ISBN 978-1-59179-309-0)
- Smile at Fear: A Retreat With Pema Chödrön on Discovering Your Radiant Self-Confidence, DVD (2011, Shambhala Publications, ISBN 978-1-59030-951-3)
