= Belleplates =

Belleplates is a brand name of a musical instrument of the percussion family and handbell sub-family. Consisting of a handle attached to a trapezoidal aluminium plate, struck by an attached hammer, they are something of a combination of handbells and handchimes. They are played with the same basic methods as handbells by teams or by individual players. Belleplates are manufactured by Belleplates, Ltd.

== History ==
Belleplates were invented by Maurice Davies when he struck with his knuckles a piece of aluminium he had cut out to make something in his workshop, and was pleasantly surprised that it made a pleasant musical sound much like that of handbells. In March 2003 Belleplates Inc won Best Use of Innovation at the Best of Business Awards 2003. They subsequently went on to win the McNOOT Award at the Midlands Christian Resources Exhibition. McNOOT stands for 'My Church Needs One of Those' and was judged by a panel of clergymen and church elders as the item in the show they would most like to take back to their parishes.

== Characteristics ==
The instrument fills a gap in the market for a inexpensive, durable and lightweight handbell type instrument. Due to these qualities they have been used preferentially to handbells in schools and with elderly or disabled musicians.

Belleplates are not used as a professional instrument, however they blend with handbells and related instruments, allowing them to be used in a concert setting to provide a contrasting melody.

Belleplates are generally sold in sets of between 12 (1½ octaves diatonic) and 61 (5 chromatic octaves). Belleplates are made with coloured plastic handles; diatonic bellplates have white handles, and chromatic belleplates have black handles. This colour distinction, as used on Malmark handbells, makes it visually easier to pick up the correct note. They are packaged with clear plastic protective covers and stored in briefcases.

== See also ==
- Handbells
