= Donald E. Allured =

Handbell composer, arranger and conductor (born 1922)

Donald Earl Allured
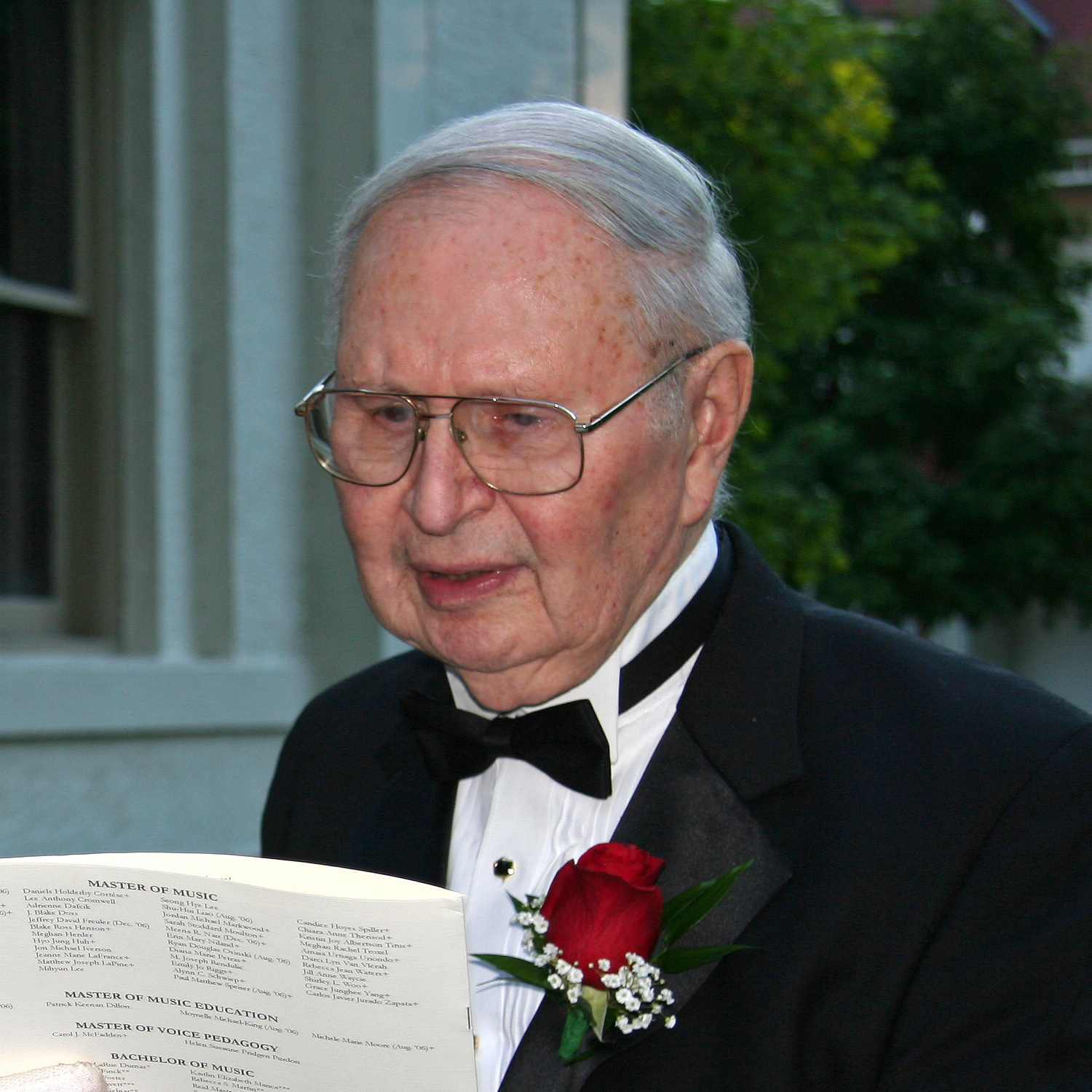
- Allured at the Bay View Association in Bay View, MI, on August 24, 2000
- Born: September 14, 1922; Lansing, Michigan, U.S.
- Died: February 28, 2011 (aged 88); Pensacola, Florida, U.S.
- Education: Alma College; Union Theological Seminary (M.S.M.)
- Spouses: Carolyn Bamber (m. 1947); Carol Ellen Cameron (m. 1959); Melissa Conway (m. 1978)
- Children: 6

Donald Earl Allured (September 14, 1922 - February 28, 2011) was an organist, choir director, composer, arranger and conductor considered the "father of handbell ringing in America".

== Career ==
Born in Lansing, Michigan, Allured earned his Master of Sacred Music degree from Union Theological Seminary in New York City. He learned handbell ringing and formed his first handbell choirs as music minister for Lansing's Central Methodist Church from 1963 to 1965.

From 1965 to 1975, he served as organist and minister of music at First United Methodist Church in Lake Charles, Louisiana. There, he organized the Wesleyan Bell Choir, which recorded four albums and toured all fifty US states as well as Canada.

The American Guild of English Handbell Ringers (now Handbell Musicians of America) awarded him Master Teacher and Master Conductor certificates, its highest accreditations. He served as the guild's president from 1973 to 1975.

In high demand to lead handbell workshops and clinics, Allured left church ministry in 1976 to devote himself full-time to those activities.

In 1978, Allured founded the Bay View Week of Handbells, which became an internationally prestigious annual event at Bay View Music Conservatory in Bay View, Michigan. Event organizers established the Donald E. Allured Composition Fund, which awards commissions for original handbell music, in his honor in 1993.

From 1979 to 1988, Allured served on the faculty of Westminster Choir College which was then in Princeton, New Jersey. There, he developed a handbell leadership training curriculum and formed and conducted the Westminster Concert Bell Choir. The choir performed on the world's largest set of handbells (comprising 85 bells spanning seven and a half octaves), toured regularly, and appeared on PBS, NPR, and The Today Show.

== Style ==
Allured, known as the Maestro among handbell ringers, innovated many of the techniques used by handbell choirs today. He used many bells with relatively few ringers, adding a physical aspect to performances.

He emphasized emotional expressiveness, leading to his often repeated motto, "Ringing the right bell at the right time is only the beginning, not the end."

== Works ==
Allured published more than a hundred original compositions for handbell choirs.

He wrote three textbooks on handbell ringing: Joyfully Ring: A Guide for Handbell Ringers and Directors in 1974, Musical Excellence in Handbells in 1984, and Mastering Musicianship in Handbells in 1992. He also wrote a manual on Handbell Composing and Arranging.
