= Dorothy Shaw Bell Choir =

American handbell choir

The Dorothy Shaw Bell Choir is the internationally acclaimed community handbell choir from Fort Worth, TX. Founded in 1964 to be a part of the annual Christmas play-pageant The Littlest Wiseman, the choir has evolved into a musical organization.

The Dorothy Shaw Bell Choir has performed for royalty and diplomats, as well as elderly and underprivileged citizens throughout the world. The choir has made several recordings and recorded with groups including the Gregg Smith Singers and the Texas Boys Choir. It has performed at varied locations such as schools, retirement centers, local festivals, churches, The Bass Performance Hall with the Fort Worth Symphony Orchestra, Carnegie Hall with Skitch Henderson and the New York Pops, the Vatican for Pope John Paul II, and Carols by Candlelight in Adelaide, South Australia attended by 30,000 people.

The Dorothy Shaw Bell Choir performs a wide-ranging repertoire—from classical to contemporary. Their music varies from the early 16th century "Change Ringing" to the familiar samba "Brazil". The choir's repertoire is specifically arranged and written for them by their Producing Director Jack Noble White. The Dorothy Shaw Bell Choir is unique in several ways. They do not perform with sheet music and/or a conductor, all of the music is performed solely from memory. They do not wear gloves, each member is expected to take impeccable care of their bells. They also do not use tables to rest their bells on while performing, as the tables can disrupt the musical performance.

The Dorothy Shaw Bell Choir performs with approximately thirty members from the Dallas/Fort Worth Metroplex. All members are students. They rehearse for two and a half hours six times a month during the regular school year. The Senior Choir is the performing group. They are mirrored by the Junior Choir which undergoes extensive training while waiting for promotion. The Preparatory Choir is the entry-level training group, which accepts approximately 5–10 members each semester.
