= The Chimes (disambiguation) =

The Chimes is a short 1844 novel by Charles Dickens.

The Chimes may also refer to:

- The Chimes (American band), a 1950s doo-wop group
- The Chimes (Scottish band), a 1990s dance music trio
- The Chimes, Uxbridge, a shopping centre in England
- The Chimes (album), a 1990 album by the Scottish band The Chimes
- The Chimes (film), a 1914 British silent drama film

== See also ==
- Chime (disambiguation) for various musical instruments by this or similar names
- "The Chimes of Big Ben", the second episode of the British science fiction series The Prisoner
- The Chimes of Midnight, a 2002 audio drama based on the television series Doctor Who
- The Chimes of Normandy, the operetta Les cloches de Corneville
- The Chymes, a 1960s garage rock group from California
