= CPU Handbell Choir =

The Central Philippine University Handbell Ringers
- Also known as: CPU Handbell Choir
- Origin: Jaro, Iloilo City, Philippines
- Genres: Handbell choir
- Years active: 1970-present
- Members: Dr. Mailyn B. Jacar (Choir Director)

CPU Handbell Ringers (Central Philippine University Handbell Ringers) (formerly CPU Handbell Choir) is a Handbell choir founded at Central Philippine University. It is considered as the first handbell choir in the Philippines and also the only 5-octave handbell choir in the country. The group was organized by an American Baptist missionary named Elizabeth Taylor in the 1970s.

The Cultural Center of the Philippines has tapped the group for the Lakbay Sining Exchange Program since 2005, and had performed in various cultural concerts in the country.

The group has also performed in several television programs and events.
