= Cynthia Dobrinski =

American composer

Cynthia Dobrinski (1950 – October 12, 2021) was an American composer and arranger of handbell music.

She has more than 175 works in print. She also worked as an instructor and conducted about 350 handbell workshops and festivals internationally.

Dobrinski earned her Bachelor of Music degree from Texas Christian University and her Master of Music degree in organ performance from Northwestern University.

She was a Fulbright scholar and taught for 15 years at the Southwestern Baptist Theological Seminary.
