= Secret Drugs of Buddhism =

2016 book by Lama Mike Crowley

Secret Drugs of Buddhism: Psychedelic Sacraments and the Origins of the Vajrayāna
- Author: Lama Mike Crowley
- Language: English
- Subject: Vajrayana, Buddhism, psychedelics
- Publisher: Amrita Press, Synergetic Press
- Publication date: 2016
- Publication place: United States
- Media type: Print
- ISBN: 978-0692652817

Secret Drugs of Buddhism: Psychedelic Sacraments and the Origins of the Vajrayāna is a 2016 book by Welsh author and Kagyu Tibetan Buddhist teacher Lama Mike Crowley. It includes a foreword by Ann Shulgin, American former author and the wife of chemist Alexander Shulgin.

The book argues that entheogenic substances historically played a role in Vajrayana Buddhist ritual and practice, contrary to modern interpretations of the Buddhist prohibition on intoxicants.

A revised second edition was published by Synergetic Press in 2019.

== Contents ==
Crowley argues that psychoactive substances were used as ritual sacraments in early Vajrayana Buddhism and that their role has largely been forgotten or reinterpreted in modern Buddhist traditions. He proposes that references to amrita in tantric Buddhist literature originally denoted an entheogenic sacrament rather than the symbolic ritual substance used in modern Vajrayana practice.

The book examines Buddhist scriptures alongside Sanskrit and Tibetan sources, archaeological evidence, iconography and ethnobotany in support of this interpretation. It also compares Buddhist ritual with the Vedic soma tradition and discusses possible botanical candidates for the psychoactive substances described in tantric literature.

== Editions ==
- Crowley, Mike (2016). Secret Drugs of Buddhism: Psychedelic Sacraments and the Origins of the Vajrayāna. Amrita Press. ISBN 978-0692652817.
- Crowley, Mike (2019). Secret Drugs of Buddhism: Psychedelic Sacraments and the Origins of the Vajrayāna (2nd ed.). Synergetic Press. ISBN 978-0907791744.
