= Benchen Monastery =

Monastery in Tibet, China

Coordinates: 32°50′38″N 97°08′46″E

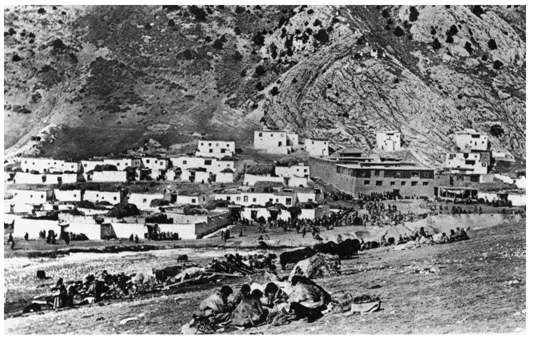
Benchen Gompa in 1927

Benchen Monastery is the name of two Buddhist temples. The original Benchen Monastery in Tibet was destroyed by the Chinese Army in 1959. It later began to be reconstructed by the surviving sangha in the 1980s. The second Benchen monastery in Kathmandu, Nepal was constructed under the direction of two exiled Tulkus from the original monastery.

== Benchen Monastery in Tibet ==
Benchen Monastery (Tibetan: པན་ཆེན་དགོན་, Wylie: ban chen dgon; Chinese: 边钦寺) in Tibet and the summer retreat, Yarnä Lhakhang, was founded by the 4th Sangye Nyenpa Rinpoche, Gelek Gyamtso in an area called Ga in the Kham region of Tibet. However, during the occupation of Tibet, both were destroyed. However, after a forced retreat to Siling the third Benchen Chime Tulku returned and with the help of others dedicated the final decade of his life, beginning in the early 1980s, to rebuild both Benchen Monastery and its Sangha.

=== The Four Benchen Tulkus ===
Before the invasion of Tibet, and subsequent destruction of Tibetan monasteries, Benchen Monastery had four Tulkus

- Chime Tulku (the present fourth incarnation was born in 1991)
- Sangye Nyenpa Rinpoche (the present 10th incarnation fled Tibet and helped build Benchen Monastery in Nepal)
- Tenga Rinpoche (the last incarnation died in 2012 after helping to build Benchen Monastery in Nepal)
- Radha Tulku (the present Radha Tulku is commonly known as Chime Rinpoche, born in 1941 he fled to exile in Britain where he established the first Tibetan Buddhist Center in England)

A year before his death, Tenga Rinpoche had a surprise reunion with two of the other four Benchen Tulkus, Sangye Nyenpa Rinpoche and Radha Rinpoche, at the 2011 Summer Camp at Benchen Phuntsok Ling, Benchen's European headquarters.

== Benchen Monastery in Nepal ==
Benchen monastery in Nepal began its construction in 1987 under the guidance of Sangye Nyenpa Rinpoche and, until his death on 29 March 2012, Kyabje Tenga Rinpoche. As a center for the practice of the Karma Kamtsang lineage, Benchen Monastery in Nepal offers guidance in meditation and Dharma studies. Additionally, in 1994, a free medical clinic began operating at the monastery, offering services to community.
