= Lama Mike Crowley =

Welsh author and buddhist teacher (born 1948)

- Born: Michael Lionel Crowley; 1948 (age 77–78); Cardiff, Wales
- Occupation: Author
- Writing career
- Language: English
- Years active: 1966–present

Lama Mike Lionel Crowley (born 1948; spiritually named: Lama Karma Tenzin Dorje, Tibetan: ཀརྨ་བསྟན་འཛིན་རྡོ་རྗེ, Wylie: karma bstan 'dzin rdo rje) is a Welsh author and teacher of the Kagyu school of Tibetan Buddhism. He is known for his writings on the use of psychedelic drugs in Vajrayana, particularly for his book Secret Drugs of Buddhism.

Having taken refuge in Buddhism in 1970 and having been ordained a lama in 1988, Crowley founded the American Buddhist community Amrita Dzong, a branch of his teacher Lama Chime Rinpoche's organisation. He is also a member of the advisory board of the Psychedelic Sangha.

== Early life ==
Crowley was born in Cardiff, Wales, on 26 February 1948. His father was a psychopath. He first tried psychedelics at 15 years old.

In 1966, when he was 18 years old, Crowley met Tibetan Lama Chime Rinpoche in London and became his first Western student. He formally took refuge and the five precepts on 1 May 1970, entering the Kagyu lineage as a lay disciple. He studied Buddhist scriptures and learned Sanskrit, Tibetan and Mandarin.

== Views on psychedelics ==
Crowley advocates the integration of psychedelics into Vajrayāna Buddhist practice, describing them as a form of amrita (nectar of immortality). He states that the Buddhist prohibition on intoxicants is a modern interpretation, and that entheogenic substances historically played a role in certain tantric rituals.

Crowley has proposed a staged approach according to the three vehicles (yana) of Buddhism:

- Hīnayāna practitioners should abstain from all psychoactive substances.
- Mahāyāna practitioners may use empathogenic substances sparingly.
- Vajrayāna practitioners may employ entheogens during ritual initiations and monthly ceremonies.

Crowley interprets traditional Vajrayāna iconography – particularly the skull cup (kapala) filled with amrita – as symbolic evidence of an ancient psychedelic sacrament.

== Personal life ==
Crowley has lived in California since 1988.

He worked as a software consultant.

From 1995 to 2009, he ran etymology webzine Take Our Word For It.

== Bibliography ==
=== Books ===
- Crowley, Mike (2016). Secret Drugs of Buddhism: Psychedelic Sacraments and the Origins of the Vajrayāna. Amrita Press. ISBN 978-0692652817.
- Crowley, Mike (2023). Psychedelic Buddhism: A User's Guide to Traditions, Symbols, and Ceremonies. Amrita Press / Inner Traditions. ISBN 978-1644116692.

=== Later editions ===
- Crowley, Mike (2019). Secret Drugs of Buddhism: Psychedelic Sacraments and the Origins of the Vajrayāna (2nd ed.). Synergetic Press. ISBN 978-0907791744.
