= Pikes Peak Ringers =

Handbell choir in Colorado Springs, USA

The Pikes Peak Ringers is a community handbell choir based in Colorado Springs, Colorado. The group was established in 1991 (34 years ago) by its director, Kevin McChesney. The group has performed a variety of styles of music, including classical, traditional, pop, jazz, new age, contemporary and original. In addition to performances throughout the state of Colorado and the western United States, the Pikes Peak Ringers have been the featured group at several national handbell choir events, have been involved with publishers in providing promotional recordings of new releases, and have recorded five studio CDs and produced two performance DVDs.

In 2004 the Pikes Peak Ringers performed the first and only classical concerto composed specifically for handbell choir and orchestra. The concerto, "Ring of Fire," was composed by director Kevin McChesney and performed with the Fort Collins Symphony in Fort Collins, Colorado. A recording of the concerto was released on the group's third CD, "Standing Room Only."

In January 2009, the Pikes Peak Ringers were selected as the winner of a worldwide collaboration contest with cellist Yo-Yo Ma.

== Discography ==
- "By Request"
- "Ring We Now of Christmas"
- "Standing Room Only"
- "In Concert With..."
- "Celtic Crossing" — to be released November 2009

== Videos ==
- "Ring of Fire" - a live performance of the handbell choir concerto recorded in 2005
- "Music in Motion" - an instructional DVD for handbell choirs, demonstrating how movement can be added to handbell choir performance

== External sources ==
- The Pikes Peak Ringers — Official Website
