= H. Dean Wagner =

H. Dean Wagner (born 1961) is an American composer of handbell and organ music. His works for handbells—including "Carillon" (Hope, 1996), "Te Deum" (Red River, 2001), "Fantasy on 'Kingsfold" (Hope, 2000) and "Amazing Grace" (Choristers Guild, 2004) -- have made him a respected handbell composer. Wagner has a Masters of Music degree in organ performance from the University of Akron and a Bachelor of Music Education from Cedarville University. He is the Director of Music for the First United Methodist Church of Cuyahoga Falls, OH, and he is the founder and director of the Renaissance Ringers, a professional community handbell ensemble in Ohio.
