= Dzigar Kongtrul Rinpoche =

Tibetan painter

Dzigar Kongtrul Rinpoche (b. 23 Oct 1964) is the title of a tulku lineage of Tibetan Buddhist lamas. They originate with Jamgon Kongtrul Lodro Thaye, one of the most illustrious lamas of recent history, known for his central role in the rimé or non-sectarian movement in 19th Century Tibet. Jigme Namgyel (b. 1964) is the present Dzigar Kongtrul Rinpoche. He is the second or third incarnation, depending on whether Lodro Thaye is counted (he was not known as "Dzigar Kongtrul"—that lineage is one of five distinct subsequent variants beginning after his death).

== The 2nd Dzigar Kongtrul ==
The second Dzigar Kongtrul, Lodrö Rabpel, was recognized by his root guru the 15th Karmapa, Khakyab Dorje, along with Karsey Kongtrul. He was the younger brother of Dzigar Chogtrül, a Drukpa Kagyü of a long incarnate lineage.

His bases of activity were Palpung Monastery, Tsadra Rinchen Drag and Dzong Shö, and later he founded a monastery known as Rango Tsokhar near Neten Gön, the monastery of the 2nd Neten Chokling Rinpoche to whom he was very close. According to Tulku Urgyen Rinpoche, a contemporary master who died in 1996, Lodro Rabpel was renowned throughout Derge for his eloquence.

== The 3rd Dzigar Kongtrul ==
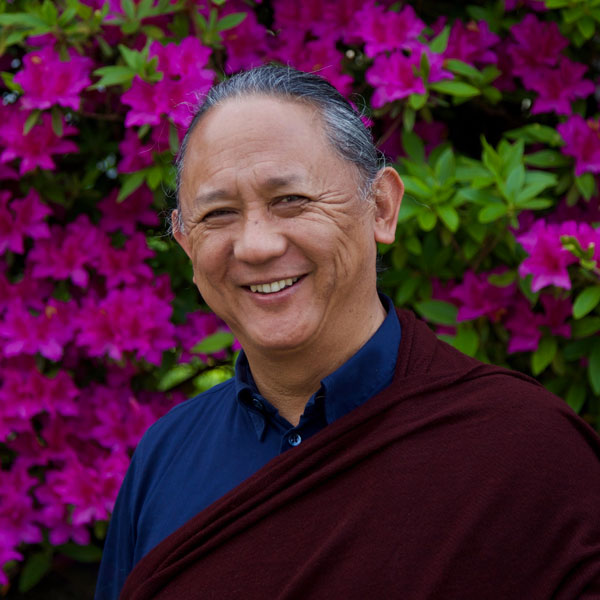
Dzigar Kongtrul Rinpoche

The present Dzigar Kongtrul was born in the Northern Indian province of Himachal Pradesh to Tibetan refugee parents; his father was the third Neten Chokling, Pema Gyurme (1928–1974), and his mother, Mayum Tsewang Palden, practiced all her life, even in the midst of raising five children. Rinpoche grew up in a monastic environment. He was trained in the Longchen Nyingtik lineage of the Nyingma school as well as the Khyen-Kong Chok-Sum lineages (those of Jamgon Kongtrul, Khyentse Wangpo and Chokgyur Lingpa—the three primary figures in the rimé movement) by his root guru H.H. Dilgo Khyentse Rinpoche. Rinpoche also studied extensively under Tulku Urgyen Rinpoche, Nyoshul Khen Rinpoche and the great scholar Khenpo Rinchen. He moved to the United States in 1989 with his family and began a five-year tenure as a professor of Buddhist philosophy at Naropa University (then Institute) in 1990.

Not long after arriving in the United States, Rinpoche founded Mangala Shri Bhuti, an organization established to further the practice of the Longchen Nyingtik and Khyen-Kong Chok-sum lineages. He established a mountain retreat center, Longchen Jigme Samten Ling, in southern Colorado, where he spend much of his time in retreat and guides students in long-term retreat practice. When not in retreat, Rinpoche travels widely throughout the world teaching and furthering his own education.

His most well-known student in the Western world is Pema Chödrön, who took him as her primary teacher in 1994, years after the death of her root guru, Chögyam Trungpa Rinpoche.

Mangala Shri Bhuti, Rinpoche's organization, has a total of five centers. Three are study and practice centers – Phuntsok Choling in Boulder, Colorado, Pema Osel Do Ngak Choling in Vershire, Vermont, and the Guna Institute in Bir, India. The remaining two are retreat centers – Longchen Jigme Samten Ling in Crestone, Colorado, seat of the e Sangdo Palri Temple], and Guna Norling in Salvador, Bahia – Brazil.

=== Artistic pursuits ===
Dzigar Kongtrul Rinpoche is also an abstract expressionist painter. Kongtrul Rinpoche views creativity as "something very large – the essence of everything". His training in the arts began at an early age with the practice of calligraphy, music, ritual dance and other traditional Tibetan arts. After his introduction to Western culture, Rinpoche became increasingly interested in modern art, particularly abstract painting and the work of Pablo Picasso and Wassily Kandinsky. He began painting under the guidance of his teacher, Yahne Le Toumelin in the mid-1990s. Le Toumelin, who is based in Dordogne, France, is herself a renowned abstract expressionist painter who was introduced by André Breton in the 1960. She regards Rinpoche as her most significant student.

=== Integrating art and wisdom ===
In his book Natural Vitality, Kongtrul speaks about how the creative process and meditation can merge. The outcome is not only profound works of art, but an added dimension for our spiritual growth.

The essential practice of meditation is to allow the mind to express itself freely without fear or judgment. In each moment of awareness we encounter impressions of the outer world through our sense perception as well as our inner world of thoughts, feelings and emotions. When, through the process of meditation, we are able to let this incredible array of experience be, without trying to reject what we fear or pull in what we feel attracted to – when we relax into experience without trying to manipulate it in any way – we have a complete experience of mind, naked and unaltered. Art, when it is free of such notions of beauty and ugliness, ‘shoulds’ and ‘shouldn’ts’ can be used to express this complete experience of mind. When art evolves from this understanding it provides the possibility for those who see it to also experience the natural and unfabricated nature of their own awareness. –Dzigar Kongtrul Rinpoche

== Bibliography ==
- Dzigar Kongtrul Rinpoche It's Up to You: The Practice of Self-Reflection on the Buddhist Path, Shambhala Publications, Boston, Mass. 2005. ISBN 1-59030-148-X
- "Light Coming Through", paintings of Kongtrul Jigme Namgyel, MSB, Boulder, CO; ESN B003NYNI2C
- "Natural Vitality", the paintings of Kongtrul Jigme Namgyel, Sarasvati Publishing, Crestone, CO; ASIN B00O15D8YK
- Dzigar Kongtrul Rinpoche Uncommon Happiness: The Path of the Compassionate Warrior; ISBN 978-9627341635
- Dzigar Kongtrul Rinpoche Light Comes Through: Buddhist Teachings on Awakening to Our Natural Intelligence; 'ISBN 978-1590307199
- Dzigar Kongtrul Rinpoche Like a Diamond: Transformation in the Three Yanas]; ASIN B00EHLM9DY
- Dzigar Kongtrul Rinpoche Heart Advice: Selected Teachings from the Mangala Shri Bhuti Dharma Blog; ISBN 978-1500220655
- Dzigar Kongtrul Rinpoche Training in Tenderness; ISBN 978-1611805581
- Dzigar Kongtrul Rinpoche Peaceful Heart: The Buddhist Practice of Patience; ISBN 978-1611804645
- Dzigar Kongtrul Rinpoche The Bee Story: Teachings on Patrul Rinpoche’s The Drama of the Flower-Gathering Garden; ISBN 979-8861679992
- Dzigar Kongtrul Rinpoche Diligence: The Joyful Endeavor of the Buddhist Path; ISBN 1645472361
