= Pema Chödrön =

American Tibetan Buddhist nun

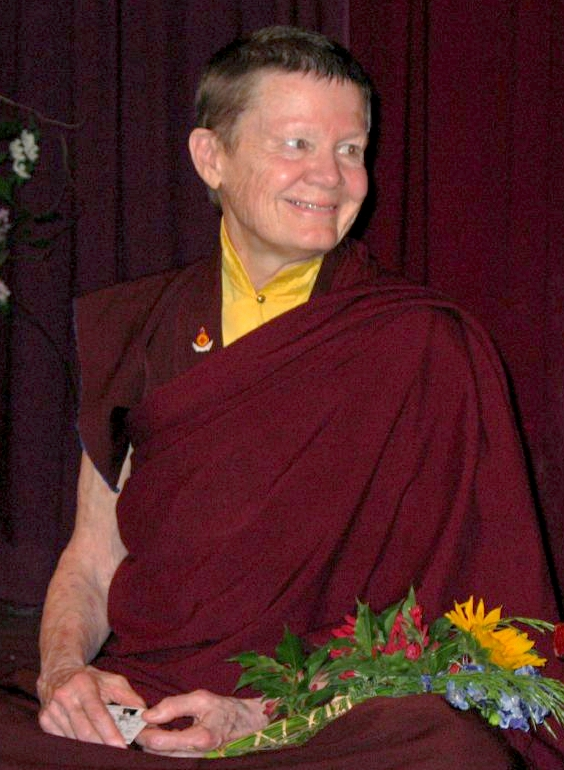
- At the Omega Institute for Holistic Studies, May 2007.
- Title: Bhikshuni

Personal life
- Born: Deirdre Blomfield-Brown; July 14, 1936 (age 90) New York City, New York, U.S.
- Children: Edward Bull; Arlyn Bull
- Education: Sarah Lawrence College; University of California, Berkeley
- Occupation: resident teacher Gampo Abbey
- Website: pemachodronfoundation.org

Religious life
- Religion: Buddhism
- Lineage: Shambhala Buddhism

Senior posting
- Teacher: Chögyam Trungpa; Dzigar Kongtrul Rinpoche

Pema Chödrön (Standard Tibetan: པདྨ་ཆོས་སྒྲོན།, romanized: padma chos sgron, lit. 'lotus dharma lamp'; born Deirdre Blomfield-Brown, July 14, 1936) is an American-born Tibetan Buddhist. She is an ordained nun, former acharya of Shambhala Buddhism and disciple of Chögyam Trungpa Rinpoche. Chödrön has written several dozen books and audiobooks, and was principal teacher at Gampo Abbey in Nova Scotia. She retired in 2020.

== Early life and education ==
Chödrön was born Deirdre Blomfield-Brown in 1936 in New York City. She grew up Catholic. She grew up on a New Jersey farm with an older brother and sister, and graduated from Miss Porter's School in Farmington, Connecticut. She obtained a bachelor's degree in English literature from Sarah Lawrence College and a master's degree in elementary education from the University of California, Berkeley.

== Career ==
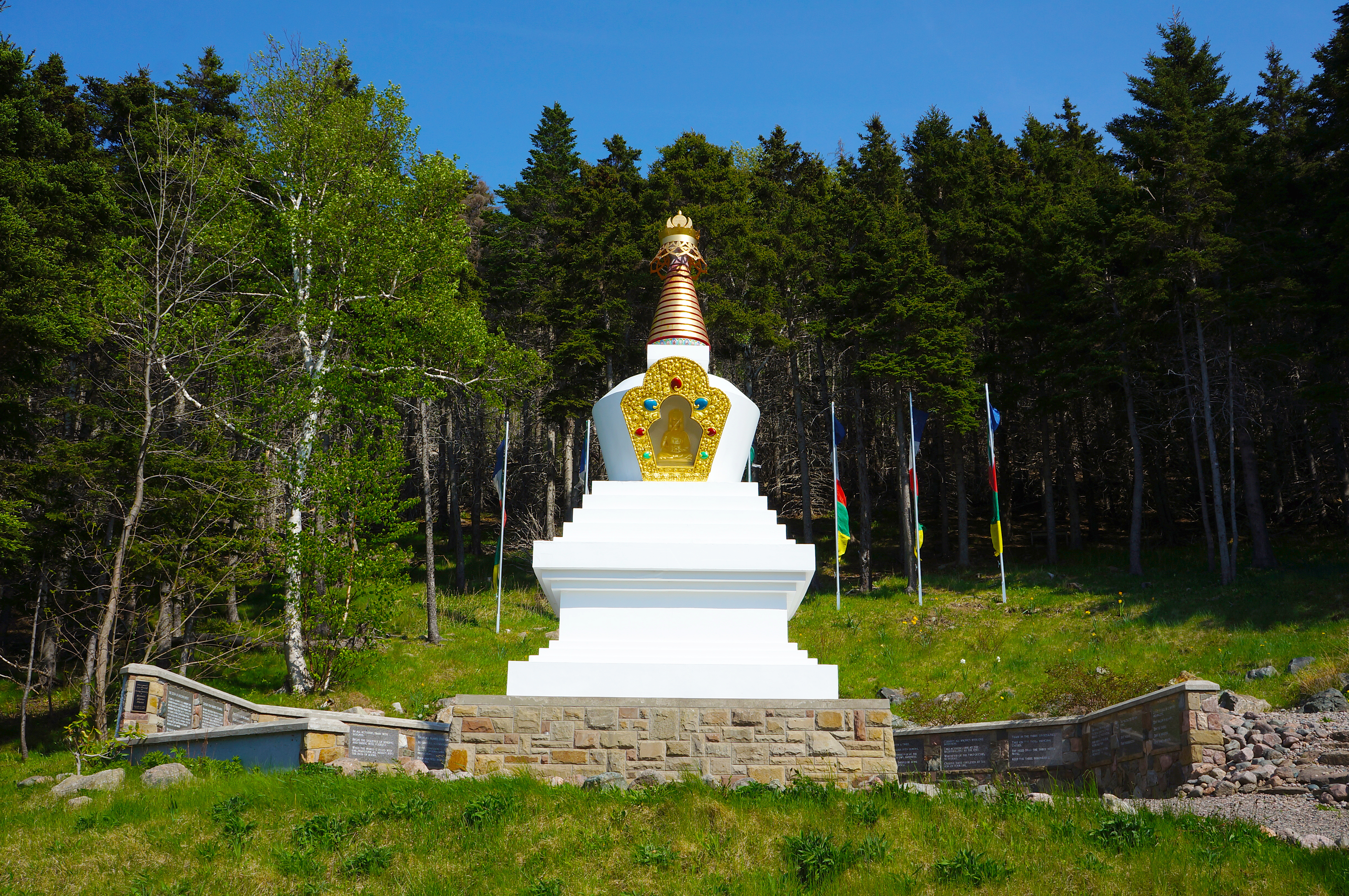
Stupa of Enlightenment at Chodron's Gampo Abbey

Chödrön began studying with Lama Chime Rinpoche during frequent trips to London over a period of several years. While in the United States she studied with Trungpa Rinpoche in San Francisco. In 1974, she became a novice Buddhist nun under Rangjung Rigpe Dorje, the sixteenth Gyalwa Karmapa. In Hong Kong in 1981 she became the first American in the Vajrayana tradition to become a fully ordained nun or bhikṣuṇī.

Trungpa appointed Chödrön director of the Boulder Shambhala Center (Boulder Dharmadhatu) in Colorado in the early 1980s. Chödrön moved to Gampo Abbey in 1984, the first Tibetan Buddhist monastery in North America for Western men and women, and became its first director in 1986. Chödrön's first book, The Wisdom of No Escape, was published in 1991. Then, in 1993, she was given the title of acharya when Trungpa's son, Sakyong Mipham Rinpoche, assumed leadership of his father's Shambhala lineage.

In 1994, she became ill with chronic fatigue syndrome, but gradually her health improved. During this period, she met Dzigar Kongtrul Rinpoche and took him as her teacher. That year she published her second book, Start Where You Are and in 1996, When Things Fall Apart. No Time to Lose, a commentary on Shantideva's Guide to the Bodhisattva's Way of Life, was published in 2005. That year, Chödrön became a member of The Committee of Western Bhikshunis. Practicing Peace in Times of War came out in 2007. In 2016 she was awarded the Global Bhikkhuni Award, presented by the Chinese Buddhist Bhikkhuni Association of Taiwan. In 2020 she resigned from her acharya role from Shambhala International, in part due to the group's handling of sexual misconduct allegations, saying, "I do not feel that I can continue any longer as a representative and senior teacher of Shambhala given the unwise direction in which I feel we are going."

== Teaching ==
Chödrön teaches the traditional "Yarne" retreat at Gampo Abbey each winter and the Guide to the Bodhisattva's Way of Life in Berkeley each summer. A central theme of her teaching is the principle of "shenpa", or "attachment", which she interprets as the moment one is hooked into a cycle of habitual negative or self-destructive thoughts and actions. According to Chödrön, this occurs when something in the present stimulates a reaction to a past experience.

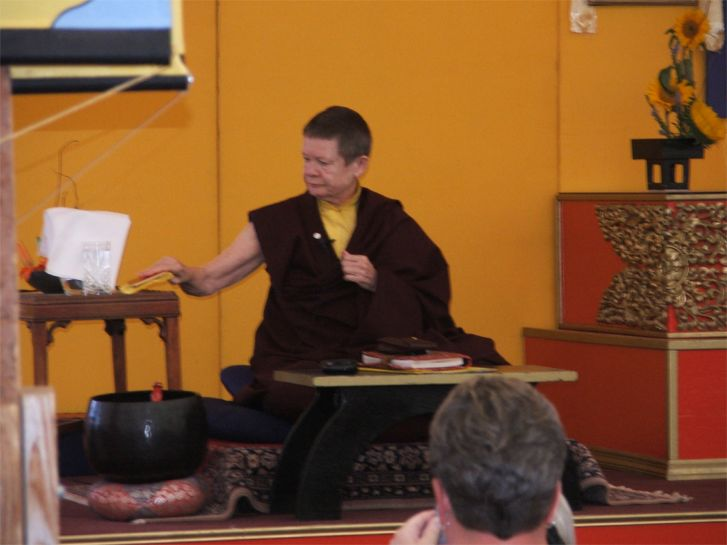
Pema Chödrön giving a talk from her book No Time to Lose, 2005

== Personal life ==
Chödrön married at age 21 and has two children. She divorced in her mid-twenties. She remarried and then divorced a second time eight years later. She has three grandchildren.

== Works ==
=== When Things Fall Apart: Heart Advice for Difficult Times ===
One of Chödrön's most famous books is When Things Fall Apart: Heart Advice for Difficult Times. In her work, Chödrön discusses uncertainty and how to find the good in discomfort.
