= Gampo Abbey =

Buddhist monastery in Nova Scotia, Canada

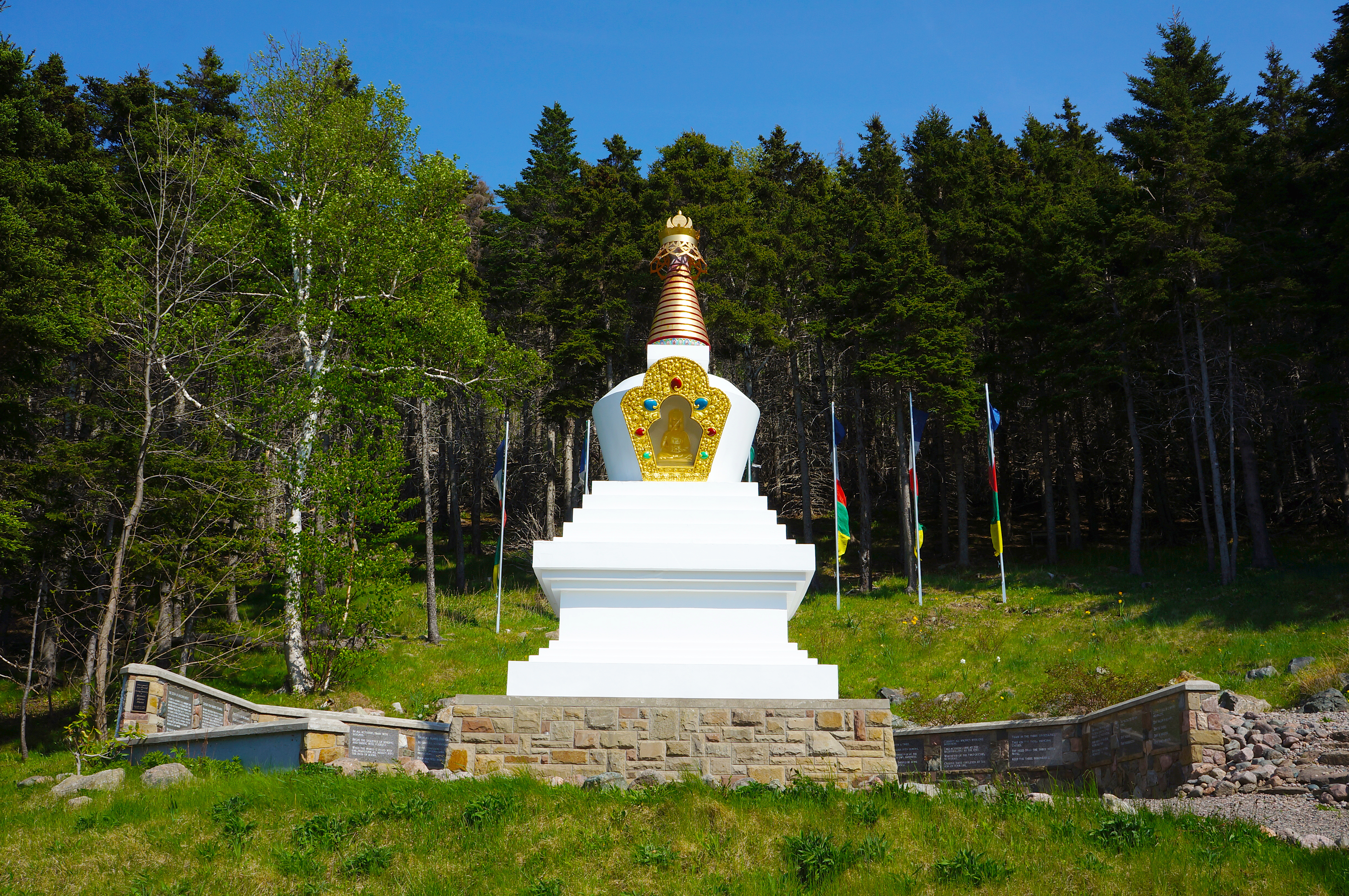
- Stupa of Enlightenment, Gampo Abbey.

Religion
- Affiliation: Tibetan Buddhist / Shambhala

Location
- Location: Pleasant Bay, Nova Scotia B0E 2P0
- Country: Canada
- Interactive map of Gampo Abbey
- Coordinates: 46°49′15″N 60°48′57″W

Architecture
- Founder: Chögyam Trungpa Rinpoche
- Completed: 1983

Website
- gampoabbey.org

Gampo Abbey is a Western Buddhist monastery in the Shambhala tradition in Nova Scotia, Canada on the edge of the Pleasant Bay community. Founded by Chögyam Trungpa Rinpoche in 1983, it is a lineage institution of Shambhala and a corporate division of the Vajradhatu Buddhist Church of Canada.

Under the spiritual direction of Sakyong Mipham Rinpoche, the spiritual head of Shambhala International, Gampo Abbey was guided by the abbot Thrangu Rinpoche until 2025, when Pema Chödrön became the new abbess.

Gampo Abbey is named after Gampopa, the first monastic in the Kagyü lineage of Tibetan Buddhism.

== The community ==
Residents of Gampo Abbey include monks and nuns who have taken life ordination, monks and nuns who have taken temporary ordination, and laymen and laywomen. The life monastics are all ordained in the Mulasarvastivadin lineages of the vinaya, or in the case of the bhikṣuṇīs, a combination of the Mulasarvastivadin and Dharmaguptaka lineages.

Gampo Abbey's guiding teacher is the well-known author, Buddhist nun, and teacher Pema Chödrön.

The Abbey also has ties to the local Cape Breton Shambhala sangha.

== Programs ==
The Abbey offers programs to residents and/or to the public, including:

- The Yarne winter retreat
- In-house retreats, where people can experience Abbey life for a week or two
- Solitary retreats
- Shedra classes (the Vidyadhara Institute)
- Shambhala programs
- Practice intensives, including Vajrayogini druppas

== Temporary ordination ==
At the request of Chögyam Trungpa Rinpoche, Thrangu Rinpoche introduced temporary ordination (Tsanchö Genyen/Upasaka Brahmacharya ordination) to give Dharma practitioners an opportunity to experience monasticism without making a lifetime commitment. The prerequisite is the Refuge Vow.

Temporary ordination is offered after residing at the Abbey for at least three months. Residents may request temporary ordination and be ordained for a minimum of nine months. Temporary monastics shave their heads, wear robes, and train in the disciplines and rituals of monastic life.

== The Shambhala Monastic Order ==
In May 2013, the Office of the Kalapa Court, on behalf of Sakyong Mipham Rinpoche, announced the formation of the Shambhala Monastic Order, which will provide the umbrella organization over Gampo Abbey and any future monasteries within Shambhala.

The Sakyong will work with Pema Chödrön, Gampo Abbey’s monastics, and other leaders on the path of Shambhala monasticism. This work will embrace the monastic practices and traditions to which the monastics of Gampo Abbey have already devoted themselves. What will be developed are teachings, practices, and skillful means that further enrich and infuse the monastic discipline with Shambhala vision and culture.

== Stupa of Enlightenment ==
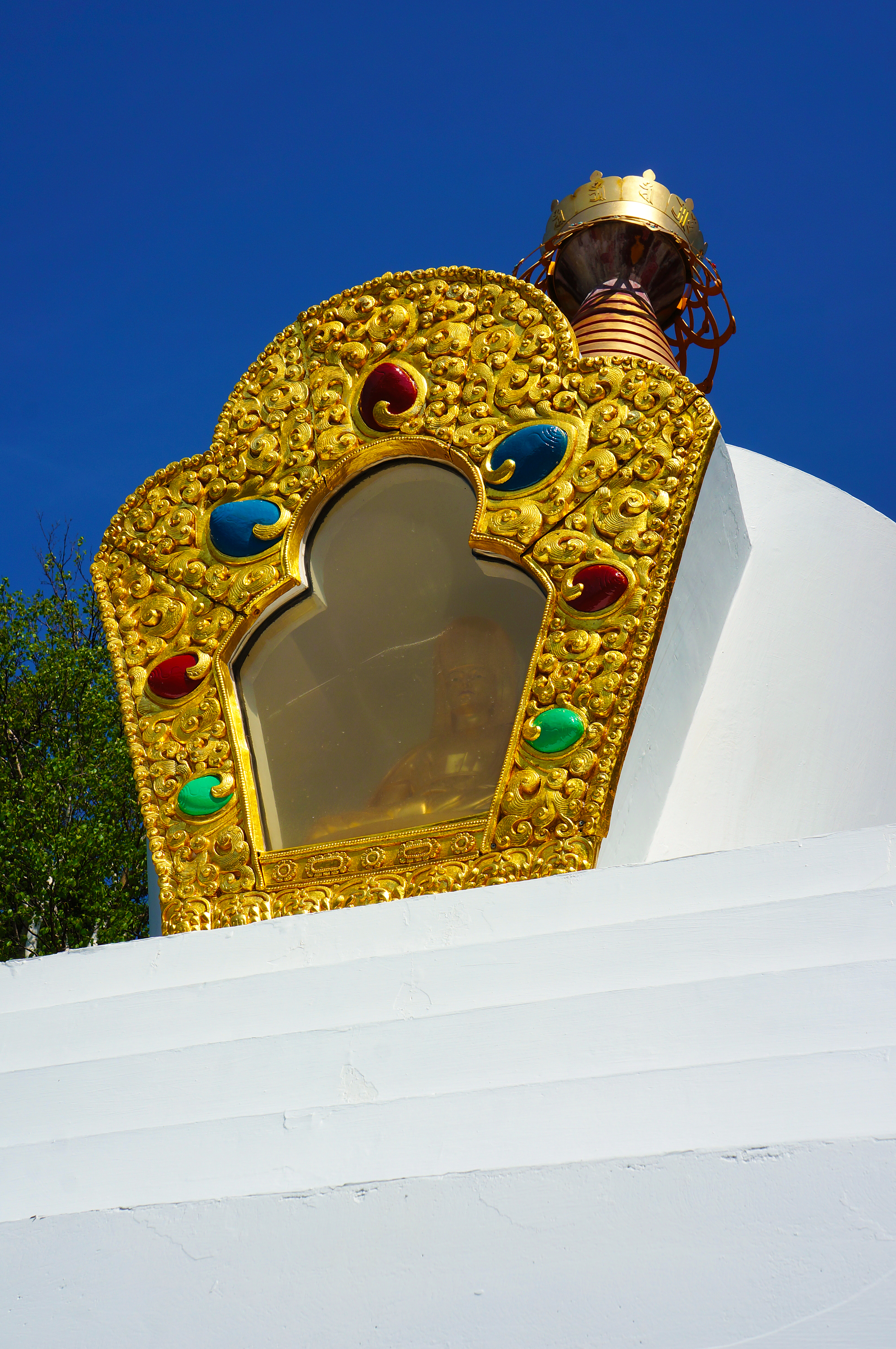
Gampo Abbey Stupa detail

In 1996 Thrangu Rinpoche, the Abbot of Gampo Abbey, requested that a stupa be built at Gampo Abbey. Supported by Sakyong Mipham Rinpoche, construction of the stupa began in 1999. After completion, Thrangu Rinpoche consecrated the stupa in August 2001, dedicating it to world peace. The Stupa of Enlightenment houses the relics of Chögyam Trungpa Rinpoche and also symbolizes that the dharma has taken root in Nova Scotia.

== Söpa Chöling ==
Söpa Chöling is the three-year retreat center at Gampo Abbey. It was envisioned by Chögyam Trungpa Rinpoche and founded by Thrangu Rinpoche in 1990.

The first three-year retreats were designed and taught by the great Buddhist master, Jamgön Kongtrül, Lodrö Thayé (1813-1899). The three-year retreat remains one of the most important institutions of Buddhism.

The third Jamgön Kongtrül named the center Söpa Chöling, which means "Dharma Place of Patience."

Three-year retreats at Söpa Chöling are done in English, in three segments with breaks in between. This schedule was designed by Thrangu Rinpoche to make the retreat more accessible for people with family and career commitments.

Six groups of retreatants have completed the three-year retreat, a total of 56 individuals. The seventh cycle of retreats is currently underway.

Notable Söpa Chöling retreat alumni include the renowned Buddhist nun and teacher Pema Chödrön. Recent alumni have written about their three-year retreat experience at Söpa Chöling.

== See also ==
- Buddhism in Canada
