= Chime Rinpoche =

Tibetan lama and teacher (1941–2026)

Lama Chime Tulku Rinpoche
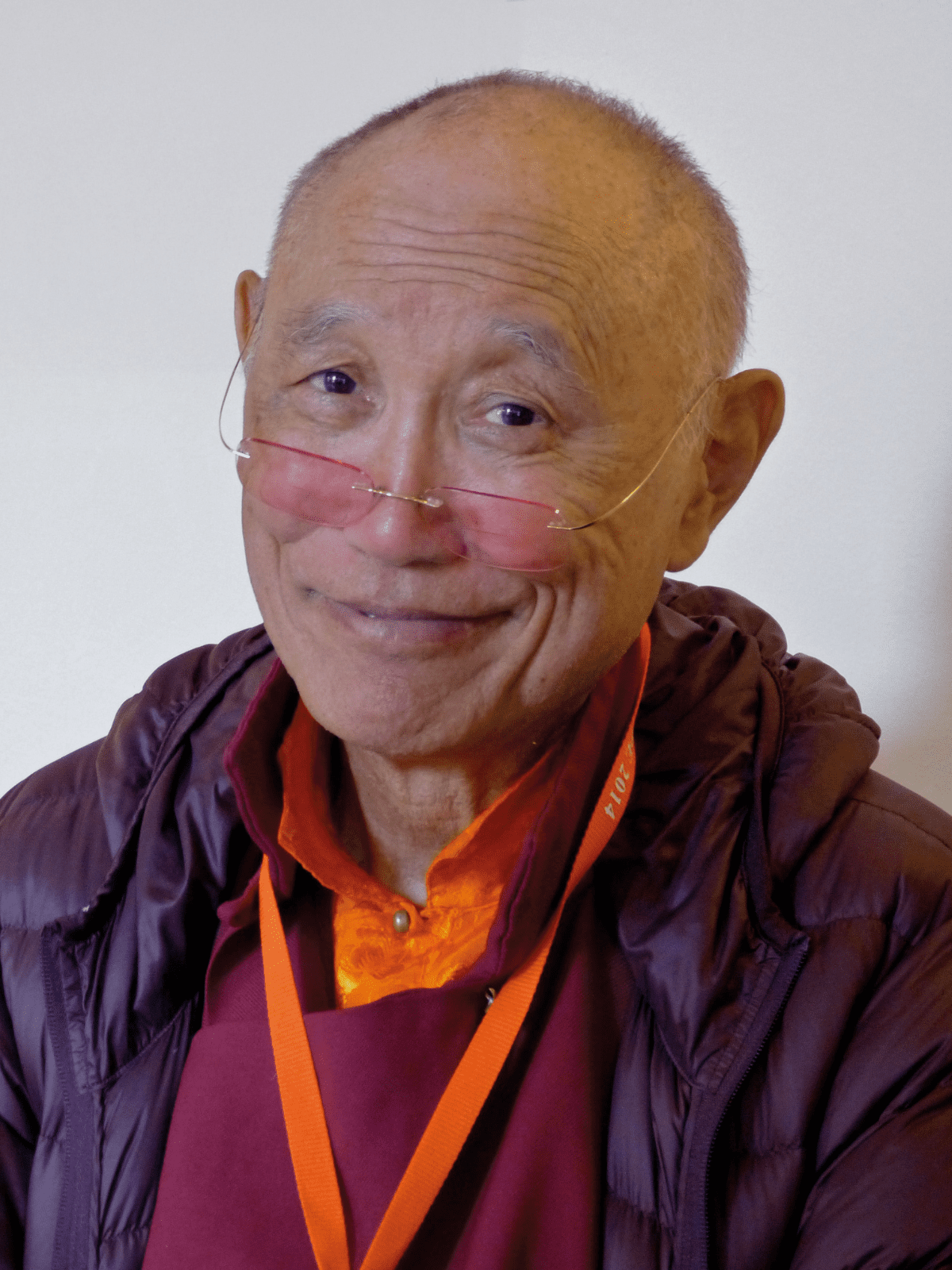
- Chime Rinpoche in 2014

Personal life
- Born: 10 October 1941 near Jyekundo, Kham, Tibet
- Died: 24 March 2026 (aged 84) London, England
- Website: http://www.marpahouse.org.uk

Religious life
- Religion: Tibetan Buddhism
- Lineage: Karma Kagyü

Senior posting
- Teacher: 16th Gyalwa Karmapa; 9th Sangye Nyenpa Rinpoche; Dilgo Khyentse Rinpoche; Khenpo Gangshar
- Reincarnation: Lama Chime Rata Rinpoche
- Students: David Bowie; Pema Chödrön; Mike Crowley; Mary Hopkin; Tony Visconti

Lama Chime Tulku Rinpoche (10 October 1941 – 24 March 2026) was a Tibetan Buddhist, Tulku and Dharma teacher. In 1959, due to the annexation of Tibet, he was forced to flee to India via Bhutan into exile. Gaining British citizenship in 1965, he taught extensively throughout Europe and established Marpa House, the first Tibetan Buddhist Centre in England. His students included American author and Buddhist nun Pema Chödrön and musicians Mary Hopkin, David Bowie and Tony Visconti.

== Early life in Tibet ==
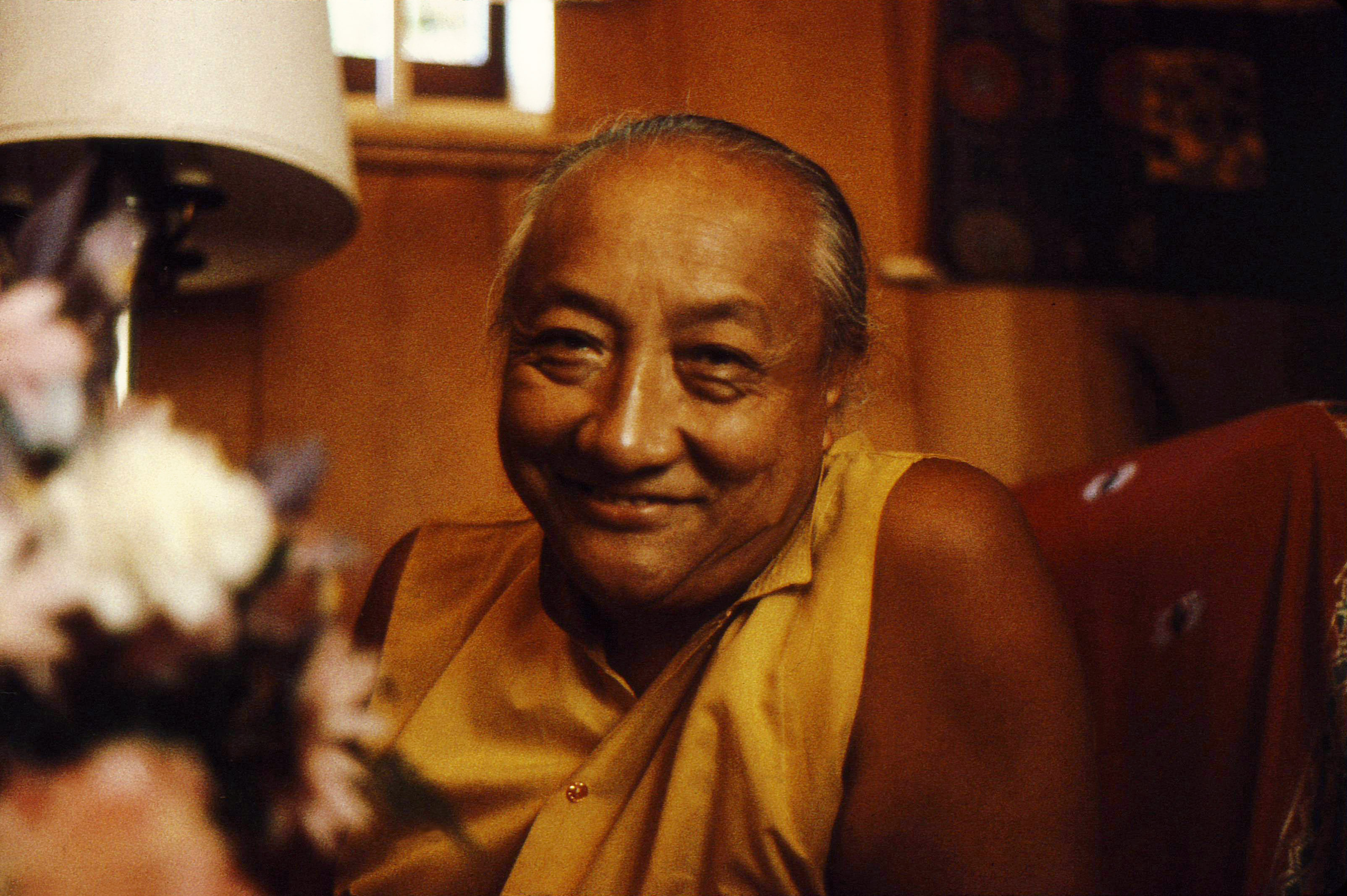
Dilgo Khyentse Rinpoche, Chime Rinpoche's uncle

Chime Rinpoche was born in Jyekundo, Kham, East Tibet, Tibet, on 10 October 1941, into a family that were direct descendants of the chieftain Rardha Pontsong, who was inspired to give his land to the 4th Sangye Nyenpa so that Benchen Monastery could be built (in the 14th century). He was not the only Tulku in his family, as both Dilgo Khyentse Rinpoche and the 9th Sangye Nyenpa Rinpoche were his maternal uncles. He was educated at Benchen Monastery, where he completed academic studies as well as a traditional three-year, three-month retreat. Chime Rinpoche studied and combined the practices of Mahamudra and Dzogchen (Atiyoga) through receiving instructions in Mahamudra from the 9th Sangye Nyenpa Rinpoche and Dzogchen from Dilgo Khentse Rinpoche.

== Escape from Tibet ==
Due to the invasion of Tibet and subsequent occupation by the Chinese army, the 16th Gyalwa Karmapa indicated that Chime Rinpoche should flee Tibet. In 1959, Chime Rinpoche reached India via Bhutan alongside his Root Gurus and maternal uncles, Dilgo Khyentse Rinpoche and 9th Sangye Nyenpa Rinpoche.

== Life in Britain ==
In 1965, Lama Chime was invited to live in the United Kingdom. He shared a small apartment with Chögyam Trungpa Rinpoche and Akong Rinpoche in Oxford. In 1966, he took Lama Mike Crowley as his first student. He later gained British citizenship, registered 22 October 1970, and lived in Britain for the rest of his life. As Akong Rinpoche was the first one to find paid employment, becoming a hospital orderly, Akong supported both Chime Rinpoche and Trungpa Rinpoche.

== Marpa House ==
In 1973, Chime Rinpoche founded Kham House in Ashdon, Essex, UK, the first Tibetan Buddhist Centre in England. The building was purchased with the help of sponsors. Previously an orphanage for homeless children called All Saints' Home, it was built by the rector of Ashdon Henry Barclay Swete. In 1975, just two years after Kham House was established, the 16th Karmapa visited this centre after visiting the Kagyu Samyé Ling Monastery and Tibetan Centre earlier in the year. Kham House was later renamed Marpa House and is run by the charity The Dharma Trust.

== Status as a Tulku ==
During his 1975 visit, the 16th Karmapa identified Chime Rinpoche as Radha Tulku, the incarnation of Radha Phuntsok, one of the four Tulkus (incarnate Lamas) of Benchen Monastery.

The Four Benchen Tulkus are:

- Chime Tulku (born 1991, not to be confused with the subject of this article)
- Radha Tulku (Chime Rinpoche, the subject of this article)
- Sangye Nyenpa Rinpoche
- Tenga Rinpoche

In 2011, Chime Rinpoche travelled from London for a surprise reunion with two of the other Benchen Tulkus, the 10th Sangye Nyenpa Rinpoche and Tenga Rinpoche, to the 2011 Summer Camp at Benchen Phuntsok Ling, Benchen's European headquarters.

== Personal life and death ==
In England, Chime Rinpoche chose to stop being a monk and married. He and his English wife had three daughters.

In Britain, Chime Rinpoche was the president of the Tibetan Terrier Association, a club that is dedicated to preserve and promote the Tibetan Terrier breed of dog. The club was established in 1967.

Chime Rinpoche died at University College Hospital in the London Borough of Camden, on 24 March 2026, at the age of 84.

== Work at the British Library ==
Rinpoche was employed by the British Library as Curator for Ancient Tibetan Manuscripts for 16 years.

== Notable students ==
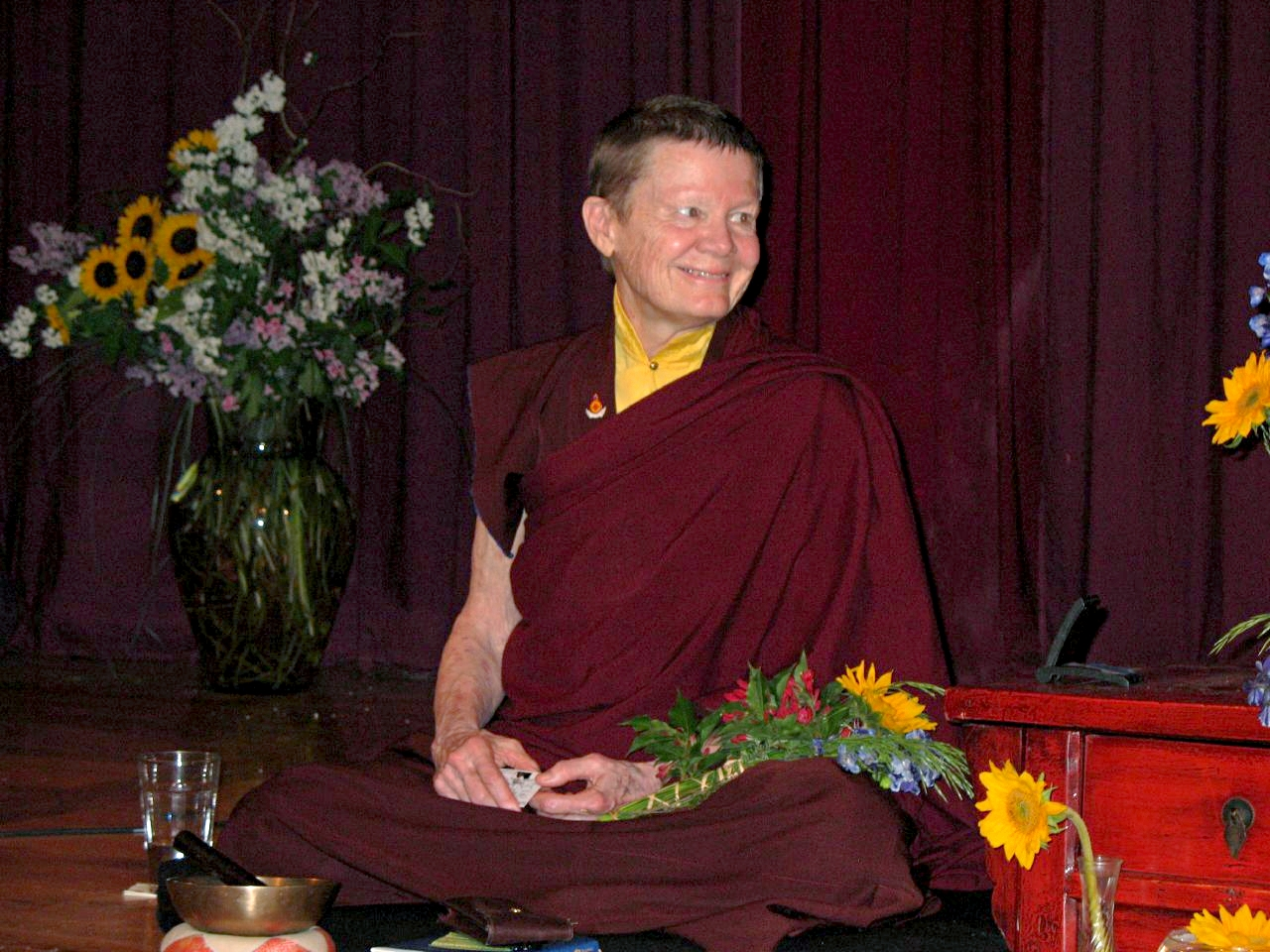
Pema Chödrön

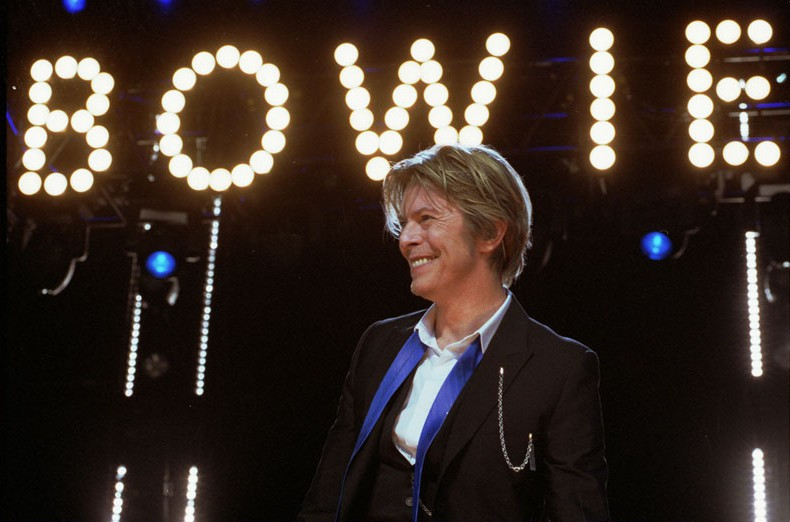
David Bowie

- Pema Chödrön – Before becoming a novice nun, Pema Chödrön studied Dharma in London with Chime Rinpoche for several years. After taking her novice vows in 1974, Chime Rinpoche advised Chödrön to seek training with Chögyam Trungpa Rinpoche, who later became Chödrön's root guru.
- David Bowie – Chime Rinpoche also tutored David Bowie for a number of months at Tibet House in London. During an interview in 2001, Bowie relates the time of his first meeting with Chime Rinpoche:

"One day, I walked into the office and it was empty," Bowie said, calling from his New York office.

"I went down the stairs and saw a man in saffron robes. He said, in very broken English, 'You are looking for me.' I realized years later that it was a question, but as a 16-year-old, I took it as a statement: 'You are looking for me.'"

The man in the saffron robes, Chime Yong Dong Rinpoche, became Jones' [Bowie's] guru for several months.

"After a few months of study, he told me, 'You don't want to be Buddhist [...] You should follow music.'"

Later, on his first album David Bowie, Bowie wrote and recorded the song "Silly Boy Blue" about a young Tibetan Monk who broke the rules as a tribute to his teacher.

- Mary Hopkin – In 2010, the singer Mary Hopkin, with her son Morgan Visconti, dedicated the song "Chime" on their 2010 album, You Look Familiar, to Chime Rinpoche.
- Tony Visconti – Bowie later recorded the track live at the BBC with Tony Visconti, another student of Chime Rinpoche. Later, whilst recording Scary Monsters (And Super Creeps), Visconti invited Chime Rinpoche to speak with Bowie about his idea to stage a rock concert at the Potala Palace in Lhasa, Tibet; however, nothing materialised.

== Publications ==
- Chime Radha Rinpoche (1981). "Tibet". M. Loewe and C. Blacker (eds.). Divination and Oracles. London: George Allen & Unwin. pp. 3–37.
