= Chime Communications =

Chime Communications can be:

- Chime Communications Limited, a public relations and advertising group based in London, United Kingdom
- Chime Communications (Australia), a telecommunications company in Australia
