= Chime Tulku =

Buddhist Tulku

Chime Tulku Rinpoche

Personal life
- Born: 1991 (age 34–35)

Religious life
- Religion: Tibetan Buddhism
- School: Kagyu
- Lineage: Karma Kagyu

Senior posting
- Reincarnation: Benchen Chime Tulku
- Website: http://www.benchen.org/en/home.html

Chime Tulku Rinpoche is a Buddhist Tulku. Rinpoche was born in 1991 into the family of Jamyang Khechog, an official at Surmang Namgyal Tse monastery.

Chime Tulku Rinpoche was identified as the fourth incarnation of Benchen Chime Tulku Rinpoche one of the four Tulkus (incarnate Lamas) of Benchen Monastery by the 12th Situ Rinpoche Pema Dönyö Nyinje.

The Four Benchen Tulkus are

- Chime Tulku (The subject of this article)
- Radha Tulku (more commonly known as Chime Rinpoche) Born 1941.
  Established Marpa House the first Tibetan Buddhist Centre in England. The present Radha Tulku has been referred to by his childhood name 'Chime' all of his life. This can be confusing, as at present two Benchen Tulkus known as 'Chime'.
- Sangye Nyenpa Rinpoche
- Tenga Rinpoche

== See also ==
- Chime Rinpoche
