= Chime bar =

Percussion instrument

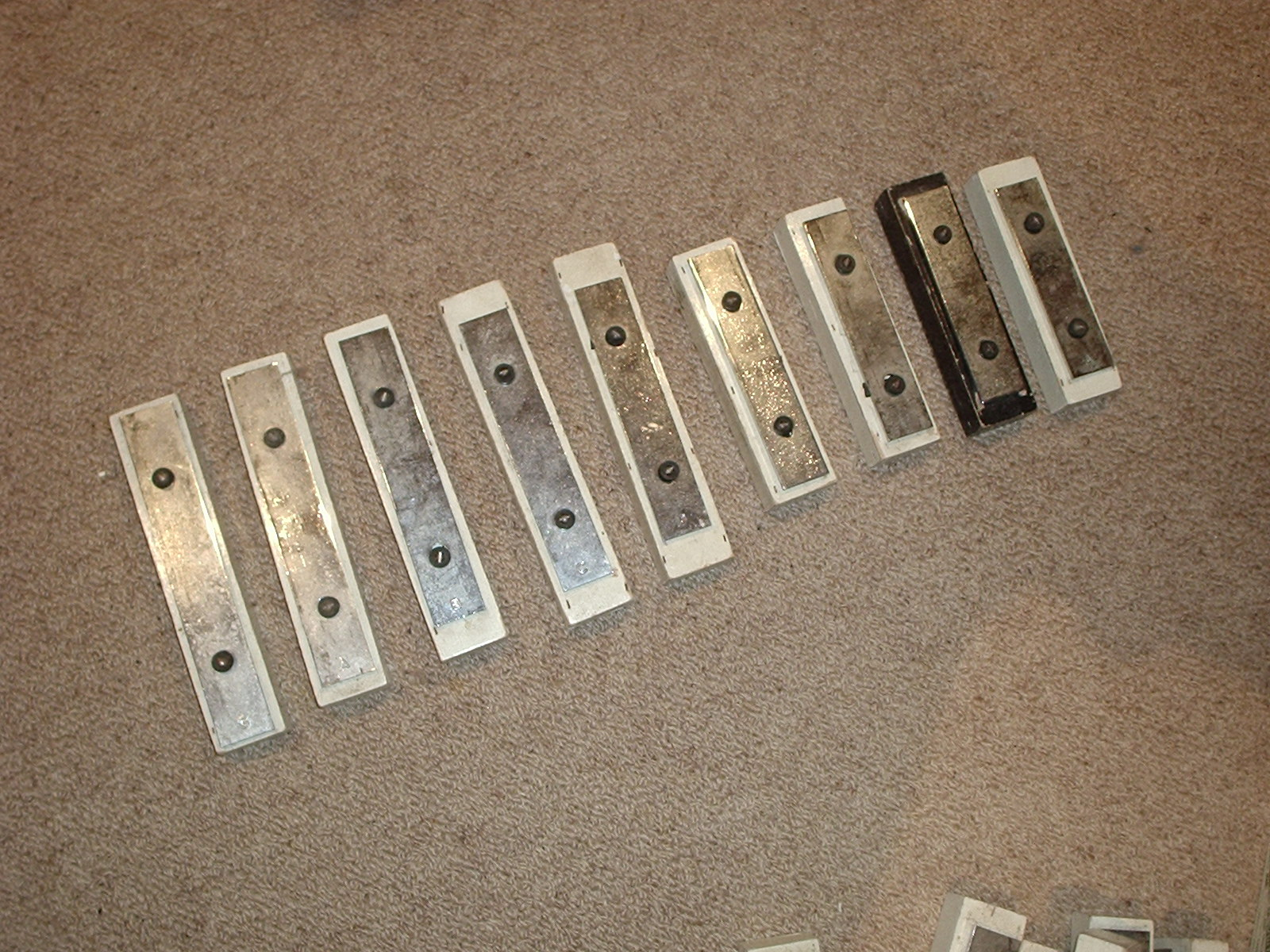
A set of nine chime bars, tuned diatonically

A chime bar or resonator bell is a percussion instrument consisting of a tuned metal bar similar to a glockenspiel bar, with each bar mounted on its own wooden resonator. Chime bars are played with mallets again similar to a glockenspiel.

The sound is similar to a glockenspiel, but with much more sustain, similar in this respect to a vibraphone but without the vibrato.

Chime bars can be arranged on a table to be played by a single player, or played by a group in a similar fashion to handbells, with each member holding a chime in one hand and a mallet in the other. They are used from professional music to classrooms.

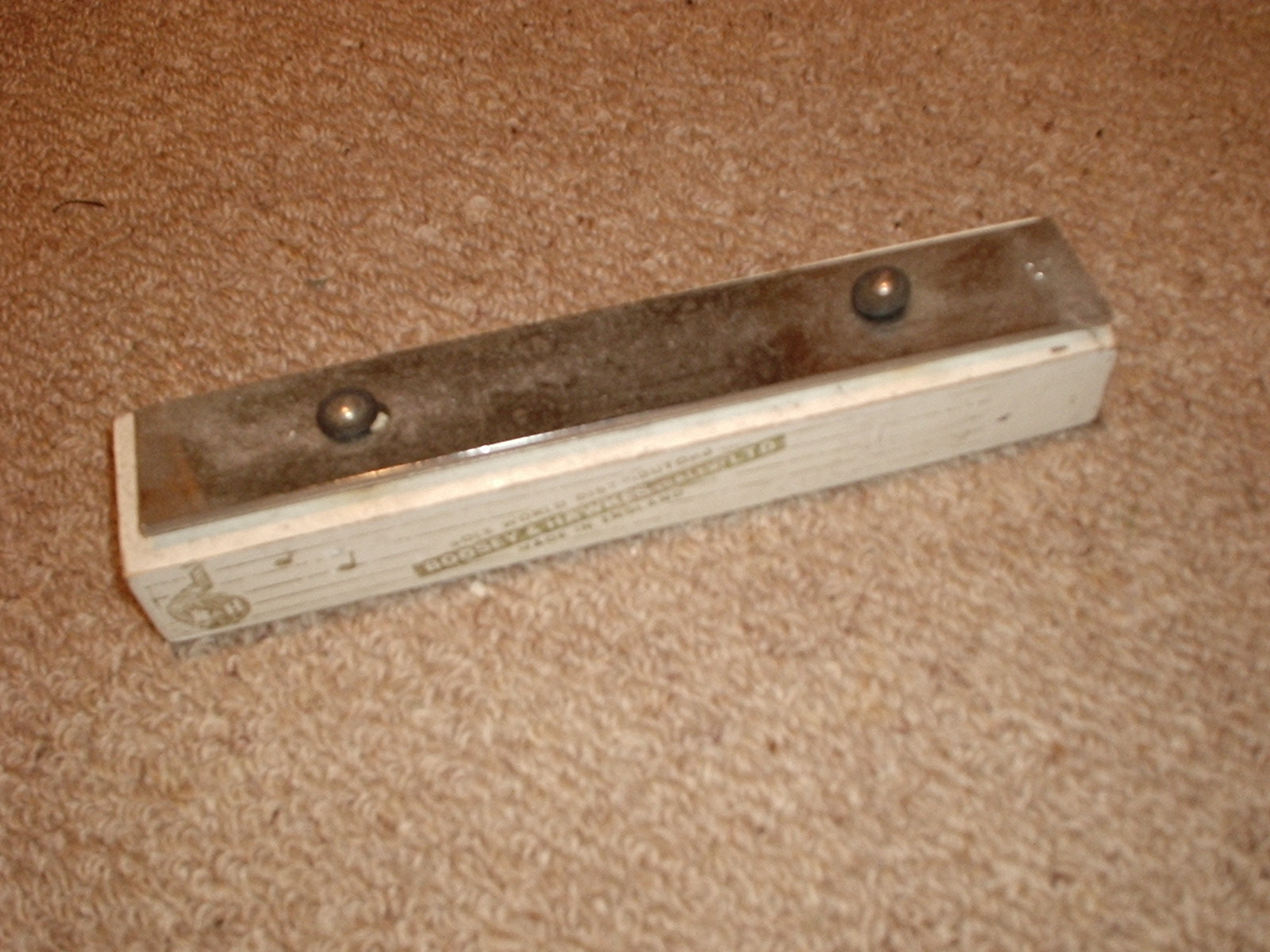
A single chime in G

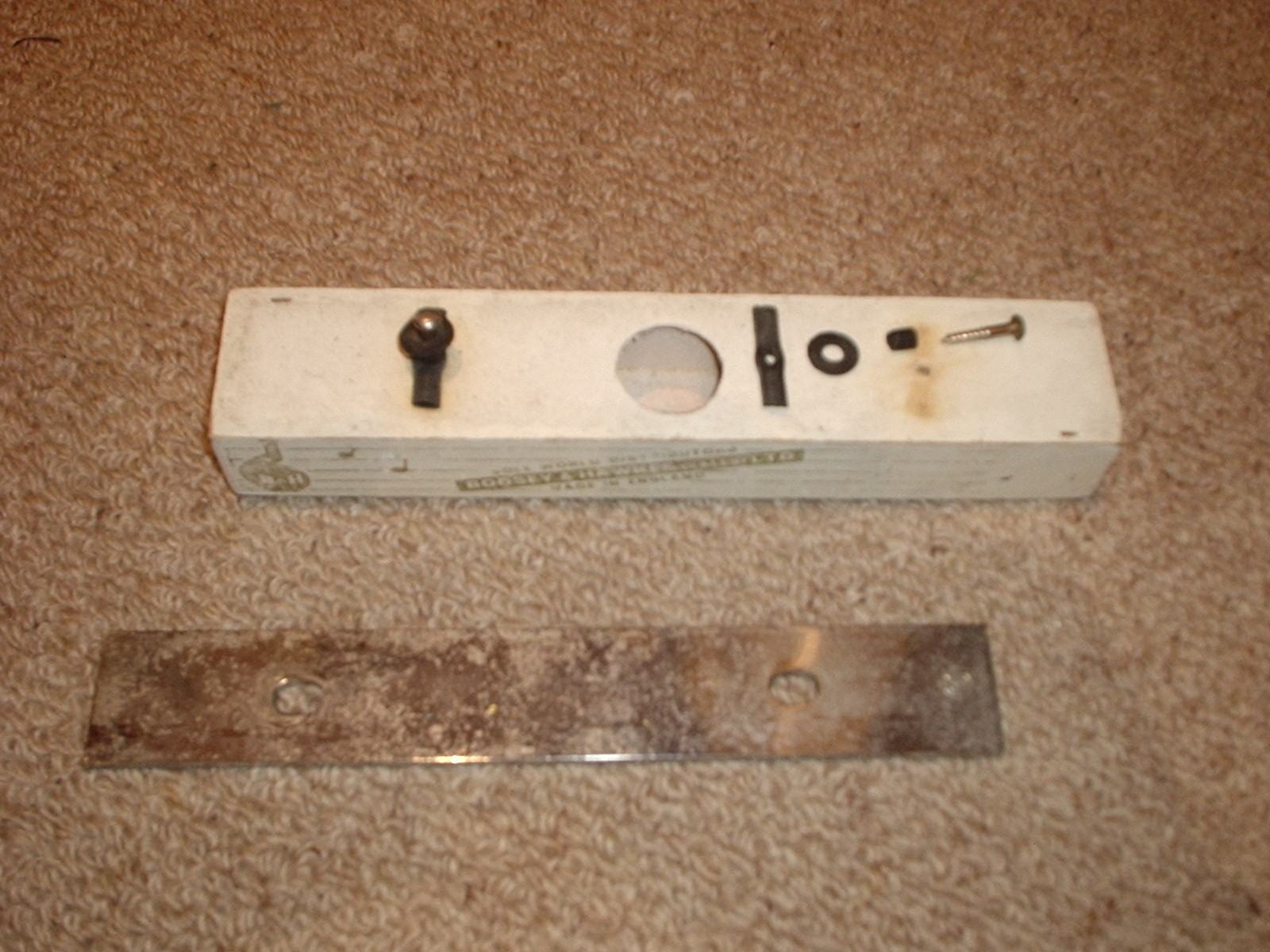
The same chime disassembled to show the resonator and mounting

== See also ==
- Tubular bell, also known as bar chime
- Mark tree, also known as bar chimes
- Percussion instrument
