= Handbell =

Bell designed to be rung by hand

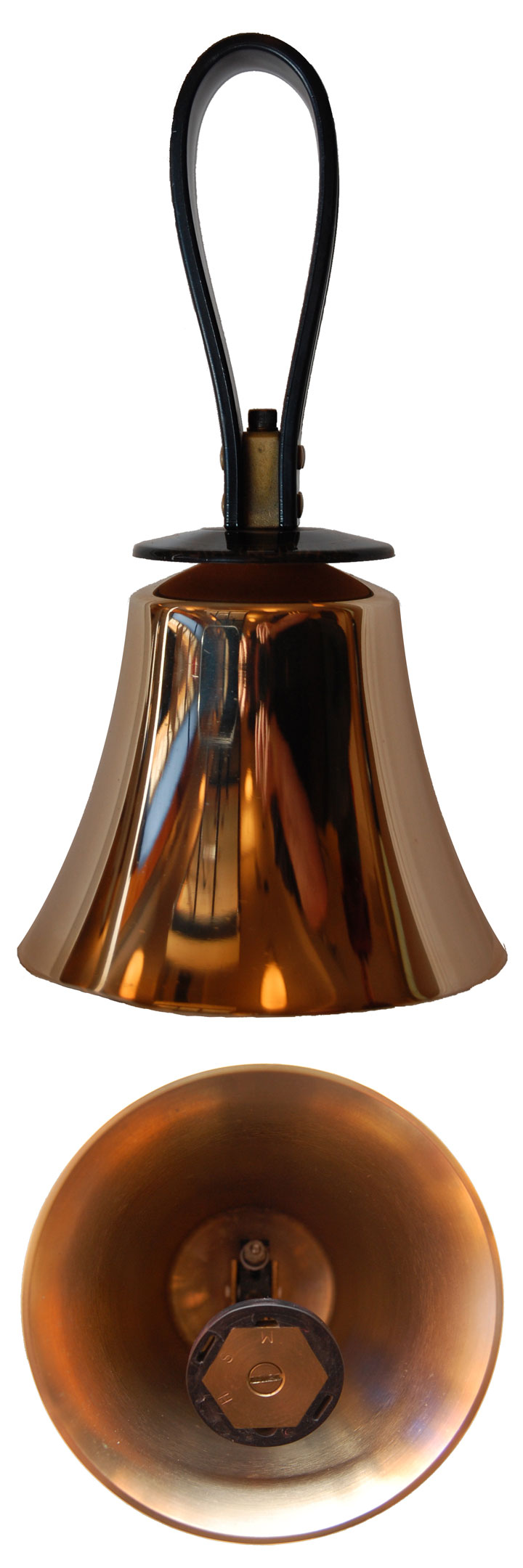

Percussion instrument
- Classification: Percussion
- Hornbostel–Sachs classification: 111.242.222 (Sets of clapper bells)
- Inventor(s): Robert and William Cor
- Developed: 1696–1724

Related instruments
- Bell; Handchime

A handbell is a bell designed to be rung by hand. To ring a handbell, a ringer grasps the bell by its slightly flexible handle – traditionally made of leather, but often now made of plastic – and moves the arm to make the hinged clapper strike the inside of the bell. An individual handbell can be used simply as a signal to catch people's attention or summon them together, but handbells are also often heard in tuned sets.

== History ==
Handheld bells have a long history. Credit for the development of the modern hand bell, or "handbell", is accorded to brothers Robert and William Cor in Aldbourne, Wiltshire, England, between 1696 and 1724. The Cor brothers originally made latten bells for hame boxes, but they began tuning their bells more finely to have an accurate fundamental tone and fitted them with hinged clappers that moved only in one plane.

Originally, tuned sets of handbells, such as the ones made by the Cor brothers, were used by change ringers to rehearse outside their towers. Tower bell ringers' enthusiasm for practising the complicated algorithms of change ringing can easily exceed the neighbours' patience, so in the days before modern sound control, handbells offered them a way to continue ringing without causing annoyance. It was also more pleasant for the ringers to learn and practise in the warmth of the local pub rather than in a cold tower in winter. The handbell sets used by change ringers had the same number of bells as in the towers – generally six to twelve, tuned to a diatonic scale.

During the nineteenth century, handbell ensembles became common in England, particularly in the north. Major competitions, such as an annual competition held at Belle Vue Zoological Gardens between 1855 and 1925, and the Yorkshire Hand-Bell Ringers Association's contests, which they sponsored most years between 1904 and 1932, were a central feature of this era of handbell performance. The competition at these events was intense and drew large crowds of up to 20,000 spectators.

Handbells were first taken to the United States by the Lancashire Bell-ringers, who contracted with P. T. Barnum to tour the United States from 1844 to 1847 as "Swiss Bell-ringers." Handbell ringing then became popular in Vaudeville and Chautauqua Circuit variety acts until these venues faded in importance during the early twentieth century.

Handbells were reintroduced to the United States from England by Margaret Shurcliff in 1902. She was presented with a set of 10 handbells in London by Arthur Hughes, the general manager of the Whitechapel Bell Foundry, after completing two separate two-and-a-half-hour change ringing peals in one day. Shurcliff organized the Beacon Hill Ringers in 1923, which was mostly made up of her own children and their friends. From there, handbell ringing spread throughout New England and eventually the United States, resulting in the organization of the New England Guild of English Handbell Ringers in 1937 and the American Guild of English Handbell Ringers in 1954. During the post-WWII era, handbell ringing was adopted by American Protestants in their worship services, which quickly became the most common use of handbell ensembles. In addition, handbells were used in schools and therapeutic settings.

The post-WWII American boom of interest in English handbell ringing also spread and inspired parallel movements in other countries, creating an international community of English handbell ringers. The Handbell Ringers of Great Britain (HRGB) was officially organized in 1967. American missionaries and educators introduced handbells to Japanese Christian schools in the 1970s, where the instrument quickly caught on. The Handbell Ringers of Japan was established in 1976 and remains one of the largest handbell organizations outside the United States. This international growth of interest in handbell ringing led to the establishment of the International Handbell Symposium, a biennial gathering that rotates between eight member nations or communities: Australia, Canada, Great Britain, Japan, South Korea, Hong Kong, Singapore, and the United States.

== Terminology ==
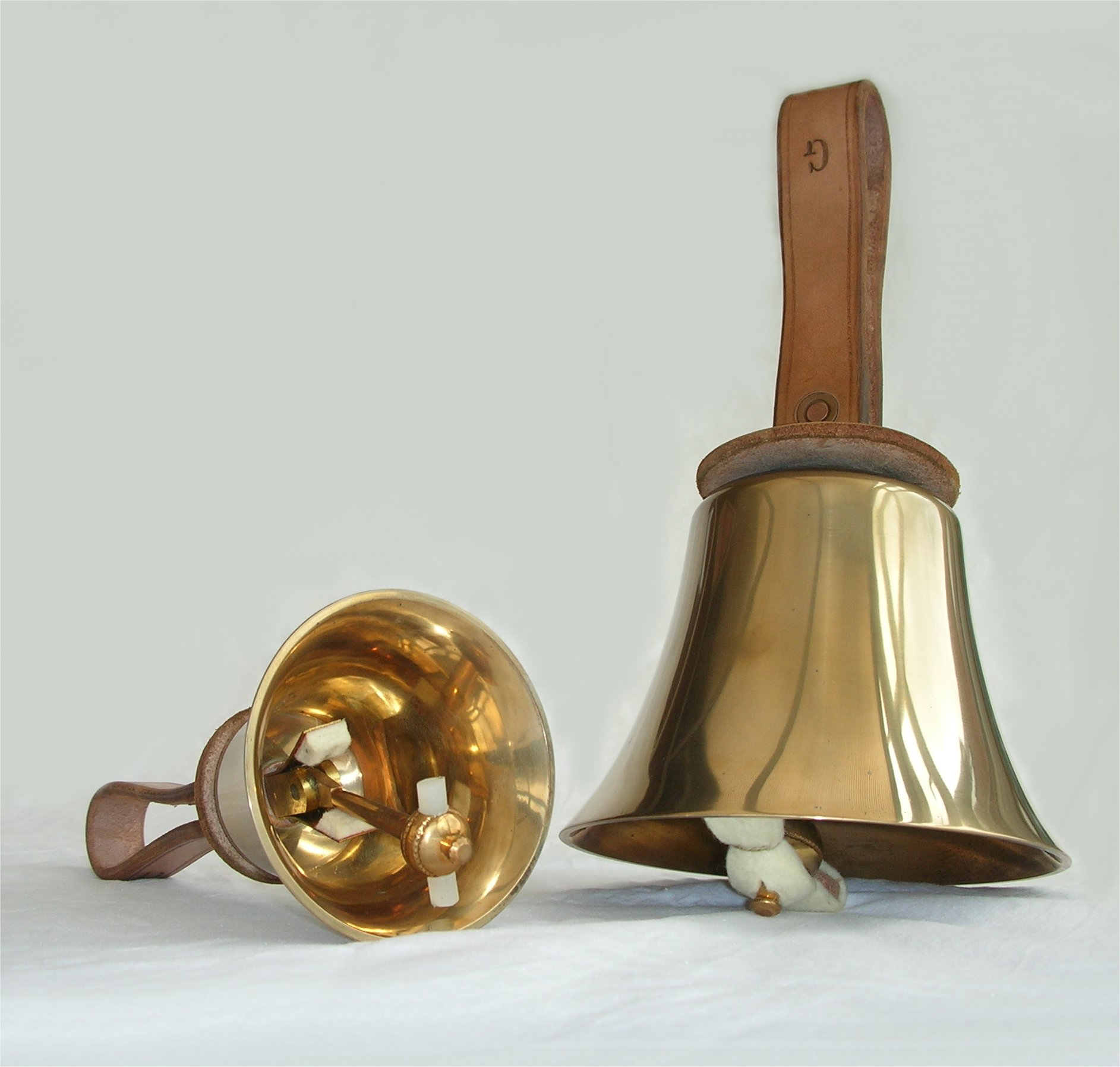
Two English handbells, manufactured by Whitechapel Bell Foundry

The bells used in American handbell choirs are almost always English handbells. "English handbells" is a reference to a specific type of handbells, not to the country of origin. While some American handbell choirs do use bells made in England, the majority play bells made either by Malmark Bellcraftsmen or by Schulmerich Bells, both based in Pennsylvania.

In the United Kingdom, there is a distinction between "American handbells" and "English handbells"; English handbells are traditional, with leather clapper heads and handles (such as the bells Whitechapel makes), while American handbells use modern materials, such as plastic and rubber, to produce the same effect (such as those produced by Malmark and Schulmerich). In America, however, they are all called English handbells.

== Characteristics ==
The two major defining characteristics of English handbells are their clappers and the ability to produce overtones. The clapper on an English handbell is on a hinge and moves back and forth in a single direction, unlike a school bell, in which the clapper swings freely in any direction. It also has a spring that holds the clapper away from the casting after the strike to allow the bell to ring freely. Furthermore, the shaft of the clapper is rigid, such that the bell may be held with its mouth facing upward. The overtones on an English handbell are a 12th (an octave and a perfect fifth) above the fundamental, while Dutch handbells – such as Petit & Fritsen – focus on the overtone a minor 10th (an octave and a minor third) or a major 10th (an octave and a major third) above the fundamental.

The casting of the bell is usually made of bell metal, but the larger, lower-sounding bells may be cast of aluminum due to its lighter weight. Handbells can weigh as little as 7 oz (200 g) or upwards of 18 lb (8.2 kg).

== Performance ==
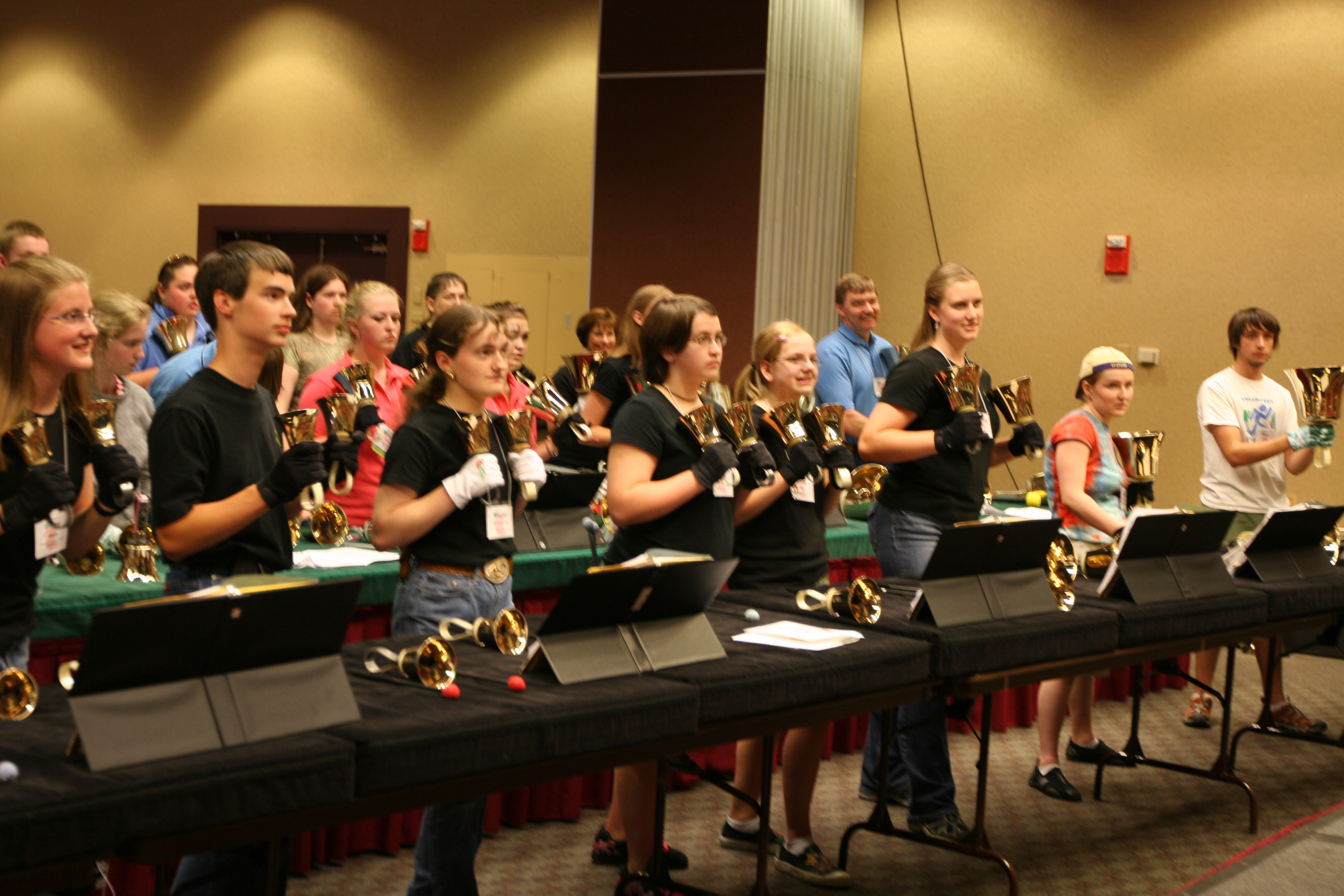
Handbell choir practicing

A handbell choir or ensemble (in the United States) or handbell team (in England) is a group that rings recognizable music with melodies and harmony, as opposed to the mathematical permutations used in change ringing. The bells generally include all notes of the chromatic scale within the range of the set. While a smaller group uses only 25 bells (two octaves, G_{4}–G_{6}), the sets are often larger, ranging up to an eight-octave set (97 bells, C_{1}–C_{9}). The bells are typically arranged chromatically on foam-covered tables; these tables protect the bronze surface of the bell, as well as keep the bells from rolling when placed on their sides. Unlike an orchestra or choir in which each musician is responsible for one line of the texture, a handbell ensemble acts as one composite instrument, with each musician responsible for particular notes, sounding their assigned bells whenever those notes appear in the music.

== Music ==
Several major publishers print handbell music, such as the Hope Publishing Company, The Lorenz Corporation, and Alfred Music, as well as free sites from individual composers and arrangers. Costs associated with handbell music typically result from shipping (many scores are only published in hard copy) and dissemination, as most scores do not permit duplication and must be purchased individually for each ringer.

The coordination of the ringers requires a different approach than other ensembles. All the ringers read from a score. This score is similar to a piano score, but with an additional convention: The C♯ above middle C and all notes below are always written in the bass clef, and the D♭ above middle C and all notes above are always written in the treble clef. (This formatting is not always the convention for solo and small-ensemble music.) Handbells are a transposing instrument, meaning that they "speak" an octave higher than written (this is to help keep the notes centered on the staff), so a middle C bell is actually a C_{5} or "tenor high C". (For simplicity, the bell would still always be referred to as middle C or C_{5}). However, some newer handbell music published today specifies to play an octave lower than written (meaning middle C sounds as C4, like on the piano) if the composer wants a bit more of a vocal character out of the handbells, or if the handbells are being used to accompany vocal choirs to not overpower the singers.

Due to handbells' relative rarity outside of the confines of church services—although less so now than in the 1980s and early 1990s—the majority of pieces last approximately four minutes. A few composers and arrangers write longer and more intricate works; generally, these pieces use handbells in combination with other instruments.

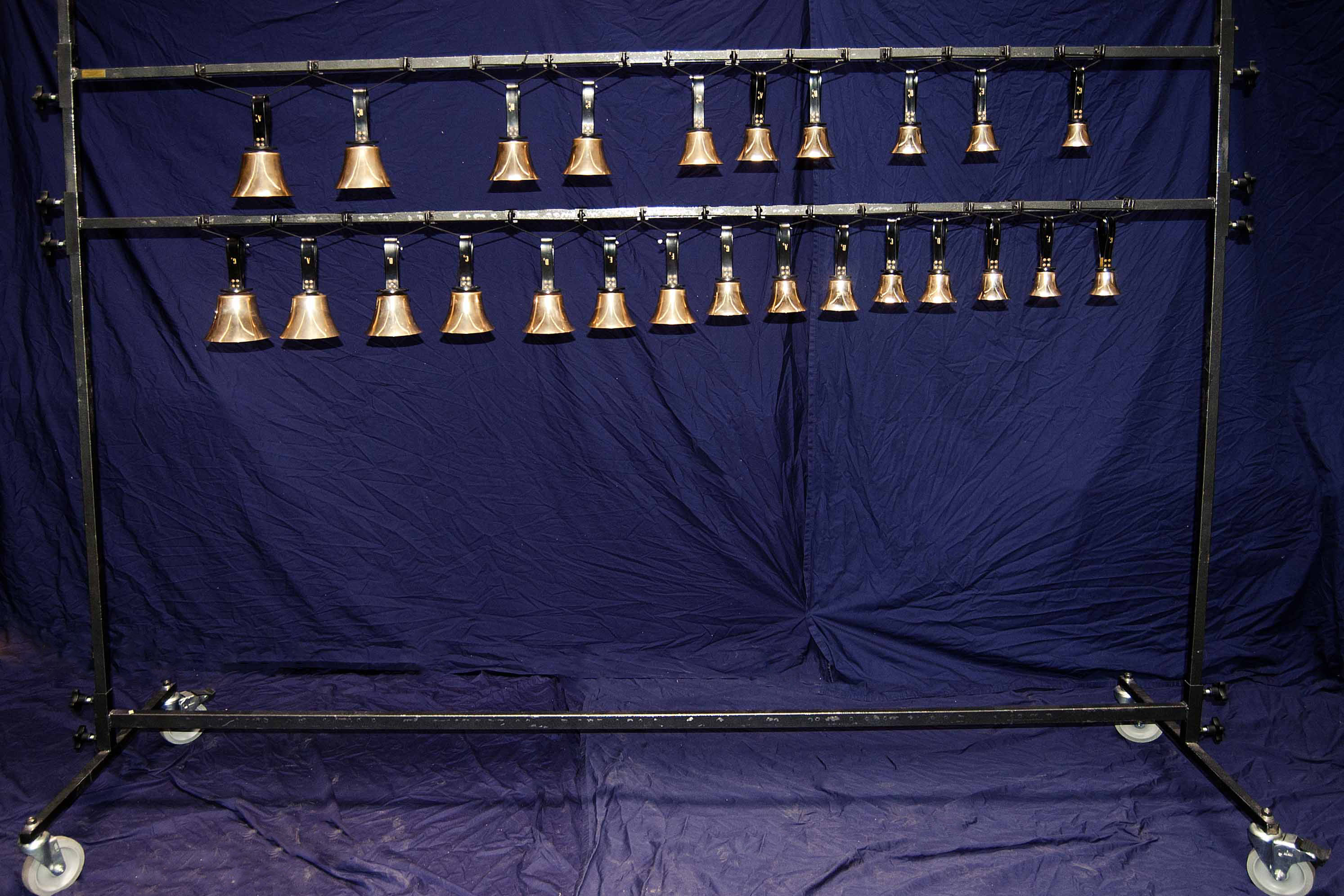
Hand bells hung chromatically from stand

== Ringing techniques ==
To ring a handbell, the ringer moves it in such a way that the clapper strikes the inside surface of the bell, usually holding it against their shoulder, bell upwards, and then swinging the bell through an elliptical shape to cause the clapper to strike the casting. The tone of the bell will continue to resonate, decaying naturally until it stops completely or the ringer stops it by damping the bell with a hand or on the body or a padded surface.

Beyond the basic ringing of a handbell, there is a wide variety of techniques that can be used to create different sounds. Christian Nathaniel Guebert has documented there are a total of 165 discrete timbres possible on a single handbell, and 74 discrete timbres possible on a single handchime

Handbell techniques have changed very much over the years. Donald E. Allured, founding director of Westminster Concert Bell Choir, is credited with fully realizing an American off-the-table style of ringing that includes many non-ringing sound effects, including stopped techniques such as plucking the clapper with the bell on the table. He is also credited for promoting precise damping or stopping of the sound by touching the bell to a soft surface, in the service of more musical results.

=== Multiple-bell techniques ===
Normal ringing technique only allows a ringer to ring two bells at a time, one in each hand. Depending on the number of bells needed for a particular piece and the number of ringers, it may be necessary for each ringer to ring more than two bells at a time or in short succession (four-in-hand). Many techniques change the sound of the bell as it is rung.

==== Four bells ====
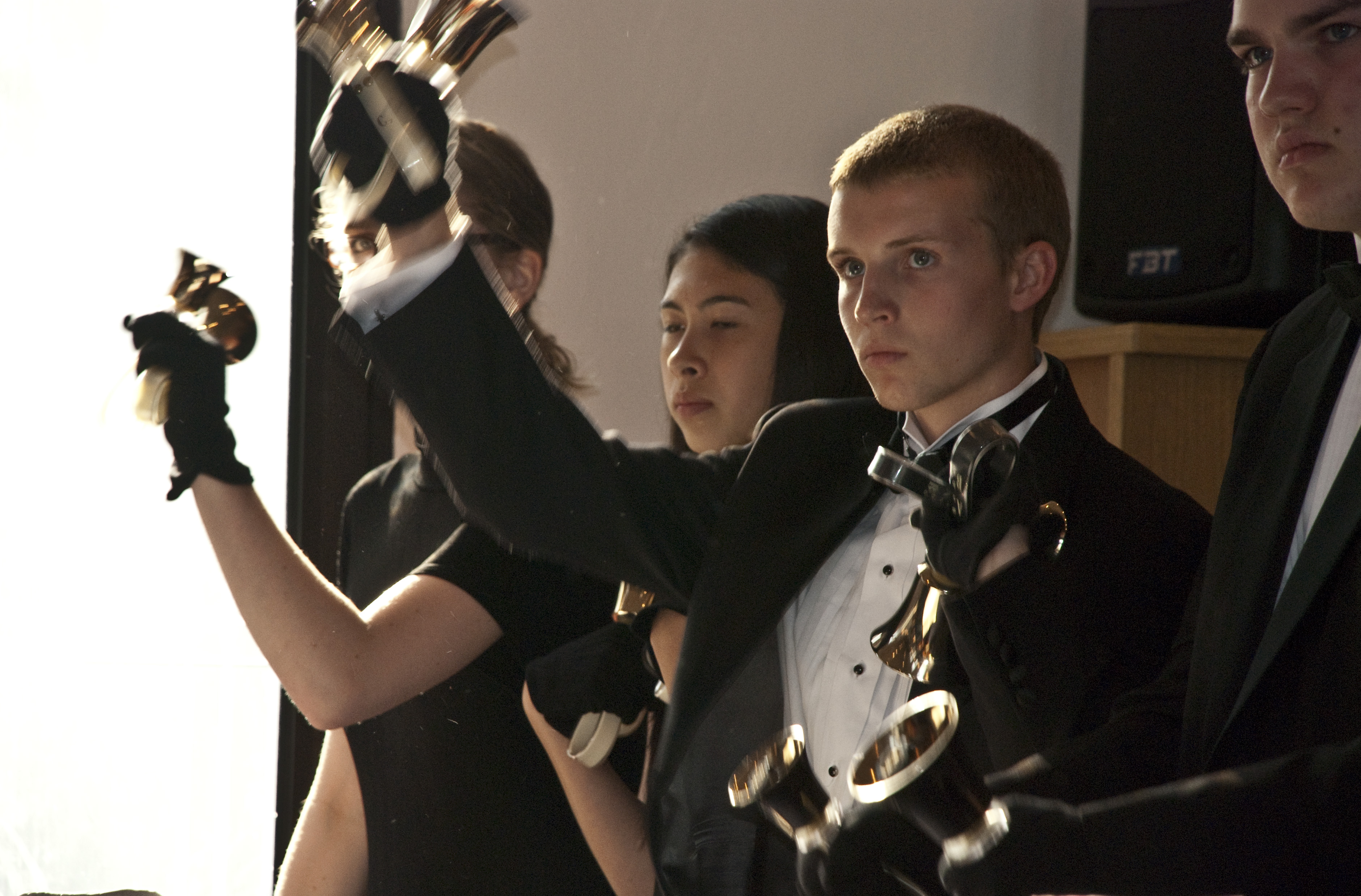
Performance with four-in-hand technique

There are two main ways of ringing two handbells with one hand: four-in-hand and Shelley.

In the four-in-hand technique, the ringer holds two bells in one hand with the clappers at right angles to each other. This allows the ringer to either move the hand normally ("ring" – primary bell) or ring knuckles-first ("knock" – secondary bell) to ring two bells independently with the same hand (for a total of four bells when ringing with both hands). The two bells can also be played simultaneously by holding the wrist at a 45° angle. In large ensembles, four-in-hand is typically used to ring multiple positions or pick up accidentals.

Shelley ringing is similar, except that the clappers are each oriented in the same direction, so that the two bells normally ring simultaneously with one movement. Shelley is typically used to ring notes in octaves, but can also be used to ring two notes separately by striking the primary bell sideways and the secondary bell forward in an action like tapping the fingers.

As to the relative merits of the two techniques, some believe that Shelley ringing is rendered obsolete when four-in-hand is perfected, while others believe that the motion of the clappers in the same plane makes certain techniques more feasible, particularly shaking, martellato, and vibrato.

==== Six bells ====
There are several ways to play six bells at a time (i.e., to ring three bells in each hand). One way is to pick two bells up as if one were Shelley ringing, then pick the third up between one's little and ring fingers (a 'triple Shelley'). All three bells ring together when ringing in a knocking motion. A second way is to pick up the third bell sideways so the clapper swings outward. Ringers with good control can then ring the first bell without ringing the third, allowing them to play three notes in two hands. Another method, called interlocked six-in-hand, can be set up by interlocking the handles of two bells so that the clappers move in the same direction (similar to the Shelley technique), rotating a third bell, and inserting it between the other two.

==== Weaving ====
Weaving is the technique of playing a succession of bells by changing which bell is in each hand as required. This is used by bass and solo or small-ensemble ringers. The large size and weight of bass bells make four-in-hand ringing impractical and impossible, and often a solo or small-ensemble ringer will need to move up and down a range of bells, possibly sharing them with others. This technique means more than two bells can be rung in short succession, using the table to damp and free the hand to pick up the next bell. If the ringing sequence requires bells to be rung in tonal order, this technique often results in a weaving pattern as the ringer must often reach across their body for the next bell. Weaving can also be used in combination with the four-in-hand in a technique called "traveling four-in-hand". By combining the ability to hold two bells in each hand with the ability to quickly drop and pick up the secondary bell of a four-in-hand, a ringer has quick access to several bells.

=== Other techniques ===
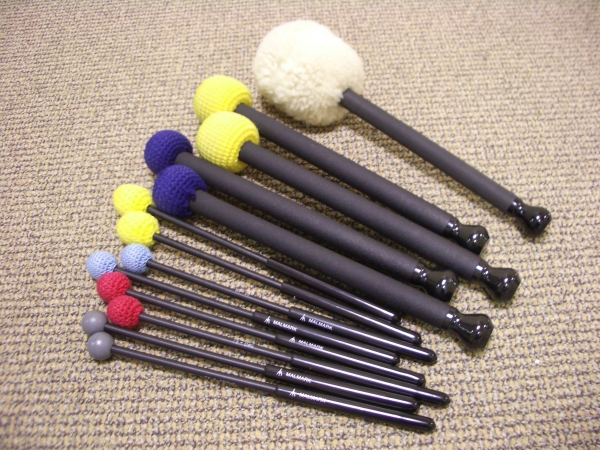
Various kinds of mallets by Malmark.

There are other ways to play music besides traditional ringing. Other techniques include plucking, shaking (or trilling), table damping (or martellato), and malleting bells (on the table or suspended).

Echo technique adds a brief pulse of increased volume to a sustained note. This is accomplished by gently touching the rim of a vibrating bell to the table.

Gyro is a technique that involves holding the bell in a vertical position, then rotating it clockwise or counterclockwise slowly to create a small vibrating sound; this can also be done horizontally to push the sound outwards.

Malleting involves using one of several types of rubber, plastic, or yarn-wrapped mallet to strike the casting of the bell. This can create a staccato tone when the casting is pressed into padding, a normal tone when the bell is suspended, or even a drum-roll effect when multiple mallets are used, or multiple hits on the bell are played. Suspended malleting can be employed to create a bell tree, which allows many bells to be played by one ringer.

Martellato, also known as a table damp, creates a staccato tone and is accomplished by striking the bell into the foam in such a way that the clapper strikes the casting immediately after the bell strikes the foam. A variation called a "Mart Lift" is accomplished by lifting the bell off the table very soon after the clapper strikes. This creates a staccato tone followed by a softened sounding of the bell.

Plucking is accomplished by using the thumb and forefinger to force the clapper head into the casting while the bell is on the table with the handle toward the ringer, producing a staccato tone.

Shaking is accomplished by rapidly ringing the bell back and forth so the clapper strikes the front and back of the casting in quick succession. This creates a continuous sound, as opposed to normal ringing, in which the tone decays rapidly after sounding. Because of their size, bass bells are rarely shaken. A suspended mallet roll is usually played if a shaking sound is desired on a bass bell.

The singing bell technique creates a sustained pitch similar to the sound a wineglass makes as its rim is rubbed with a wet fingertip, and is accomplished in much the same way. A short wooden dowel is touched to the outside of the rim of a handbell, which is being held in the other hand. The dowel is then used to rub the rim in a circular motion. The Singing Bell technique is adapted from the "Singing Bowl" tradition of Tibet.

A tower swing is when the bell is rung and then swung down and a bit behind the ringer and back up to the normal position. This creates an "echo" effect. The mouth of the bell must rotate around to create the sound change that resembles a tower bell. Usually, this is done over a period of three or four beats.

Thumb damp provides a staccato sound similar to plucking or malleting on the table. This is often described as a "tinkling" sound. The bell is rung with a thumb and/or several fingers touching the outside below the rim; this damps the sound immediately after the bell is rung. This technique can often be easier than plucking or malleting with smaller bells.

== Notation ==
There are a number of abbreviations and notations used exclusively or almost exclusively in handbell music:

- LV ("laissez vibrer" or "let vibrate", similar to a piano's sustain pedal)
- R ("ring", regular ringing or meaning to end the LV)
- SK ("shake", i.e. shaking the bell continuously during the duration of the note)
- TD ("thumb damp", ringing the bell with a thumb on the casting to create a staccato note)
- PL ("pluck", which means to throw down the clapper while the bell lies on the table)
- ▼ ("martellato", to strike the bell against the padding of the table, pushing the casting firmly against the padding to quickly dampen sound)
- SW ("swing", to play the bell in a normal position, swing it down to the waist, then bring it back up)
- BD ("brush damp", brushing the rim of the bell against the ringer's chest to cause a quick diminuendo) and
- ↑ or ↪ ("echo", ringing the bell and then touching it very briefly to the table, creating an echo effect).
- ⨥ ("mallet with handbell on table", to use mallets to strike the casting of the bell on the table, creating a staccato effect).
- + ("mallet on suspended handbell", to hold the bell upright and strike the casting with a mallet, creating the same sound as a normal ring, albeit a softer strike).

== Handbell tree ==
Handbells can be played as a handbell tree where the handles are interlaced with each other, allowing multiple bells to be played with mallets to obtain an undamped sound. This performance technique was invented by Louise Frier in the 1980s. It was further developed by Barbara Brocker, who developed a standardized bell layout. It is used by many soloists. The notational symbol used for Handbell Tree features a series of interlocking diagonal lines, one for each handbell. The pitch is placed at the lowest point of each diagonal line.

== See also ==
- Bell shrine
- Belleplates
- Campanology
- Handchime
- Dead bell
- Angklung

== Other ==
=== Notable Composers and Arrangers ===
- Donald E. Allured
- Cynthia Dobrinski
- Sandra Eithun
- Fred Gramann
- Alex Guebert
- Christian Guebert
- Jason Krug
- Ron Mallory
- Kevin McChesney
- William Payn
- Arnold B. Sherman
- Martha Lynn Thompson
- Sondra K. Tucker
- H. Dean Wagner
- Timothy H. Waugh

=== Performers ===
- Bells on Temple Square
- Dorothy Shaw Bell Choir
- Pikes Peak Ringers
- The Raleigh Ringers
- CPU Handbell Choir
- Westminster Concert Bell Choir

== Sources ==
- Bourke, Cormac. The Early Medieval Hand-bells of Ireland and Britain. Dublin: Wordwell, 2022. ISBN 978-0-9017-7788-1
