= Handchime =

Handheld percussion instrument

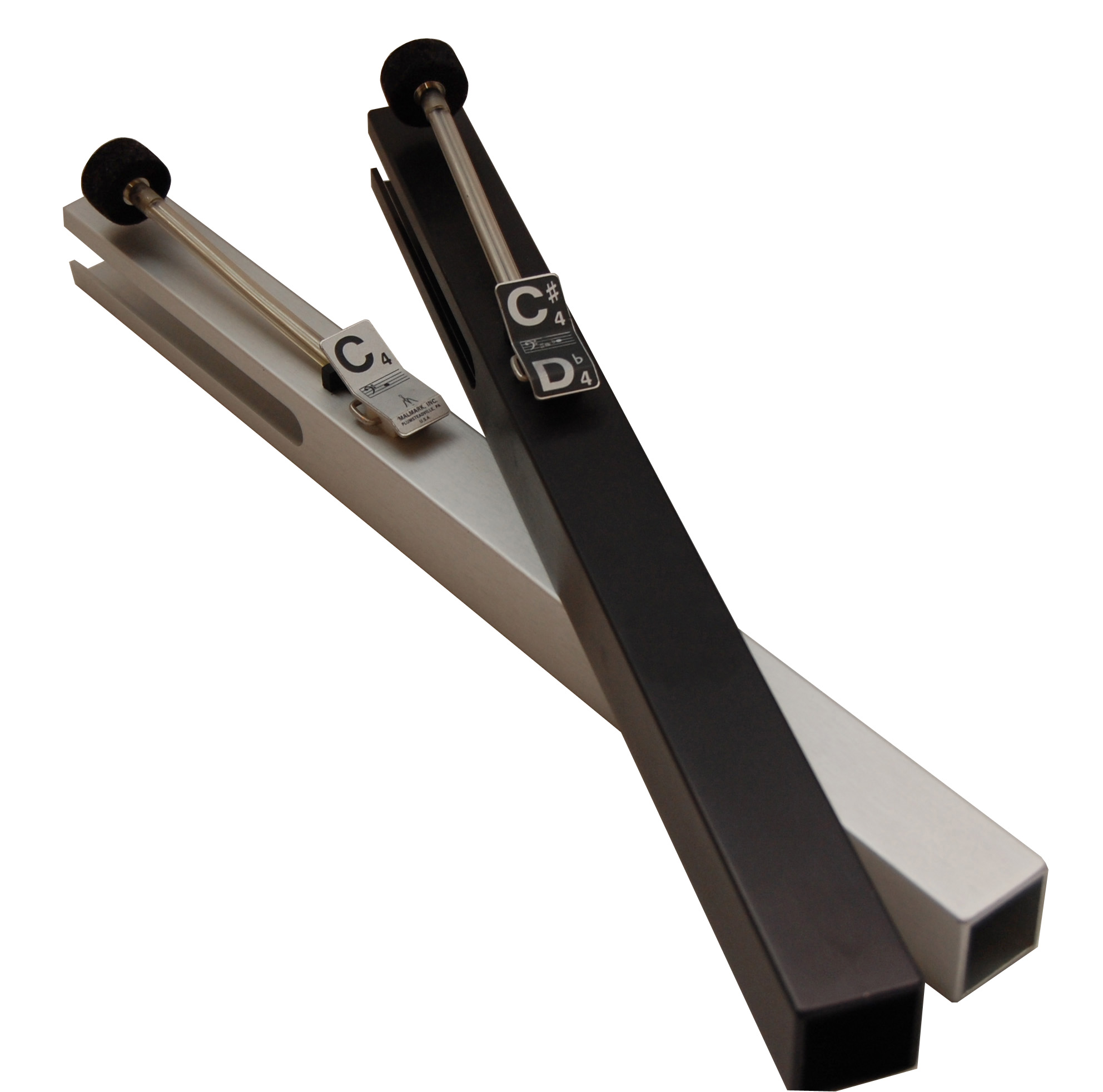

Percussion instrument
- Classification: Percussion
- Hornbostel–Sachs classification: 111.231 (Individual percussion tubes)

Related instruments
- Handbells

Builders
- Malmark, Schulmerich, Suzuki

Handchimes are musical instruments which are rung by hand, similar to handbells. Typically, they are tuned square tubes with an external clapper mechanism. Many handbell techniques can also be applied to handchimes, though some are more difficult (such as six-in-hand) or impossible (malleting). On a music score, handchimes are indicated by a diamond shape on each note as opposed to an oval shape.

== Uses ==
Handchimes were originally intended to be used as a training tool for prospective handbell ringers. They are cheaper, easier, lighter and more resilient than handbells, making them more accessible for school groups, church youth choirs and senior citizens' groups. They were originally based on bamboo instruments from Southeast Asia, with various American inventors iterating on designs. The first modern handchimes were produced by Malmark in 1982.

Handchimes are also frequently rung in conjunction with handbells. Certain handbell pieces will involve playing handbells and handchimes at the same time, or alternating between the two through various sections of the music. Handbell ensembles will frequently have a collection of handchimes to use along with their handbells.

Handchimes are also used in classrooms to teach music. Handchimes are proven to be helpful with teaching music theory and the responsibilities of playing an instrument to young children. It promotes teamwork among the students. This is because handchimes are played individually rather than in unison. Each student is responsible for the chimes assigned to him or her.

== Manufacturers ==
As of 2018, there are 3 manufacturers of handchimes in the United States:

- Malmark (Choirchimes)
- Schulmerich (bell maker) (MelodyChimes)
- Suzuki (ToneChimes)
