= Batucada =

Percussive style of samba

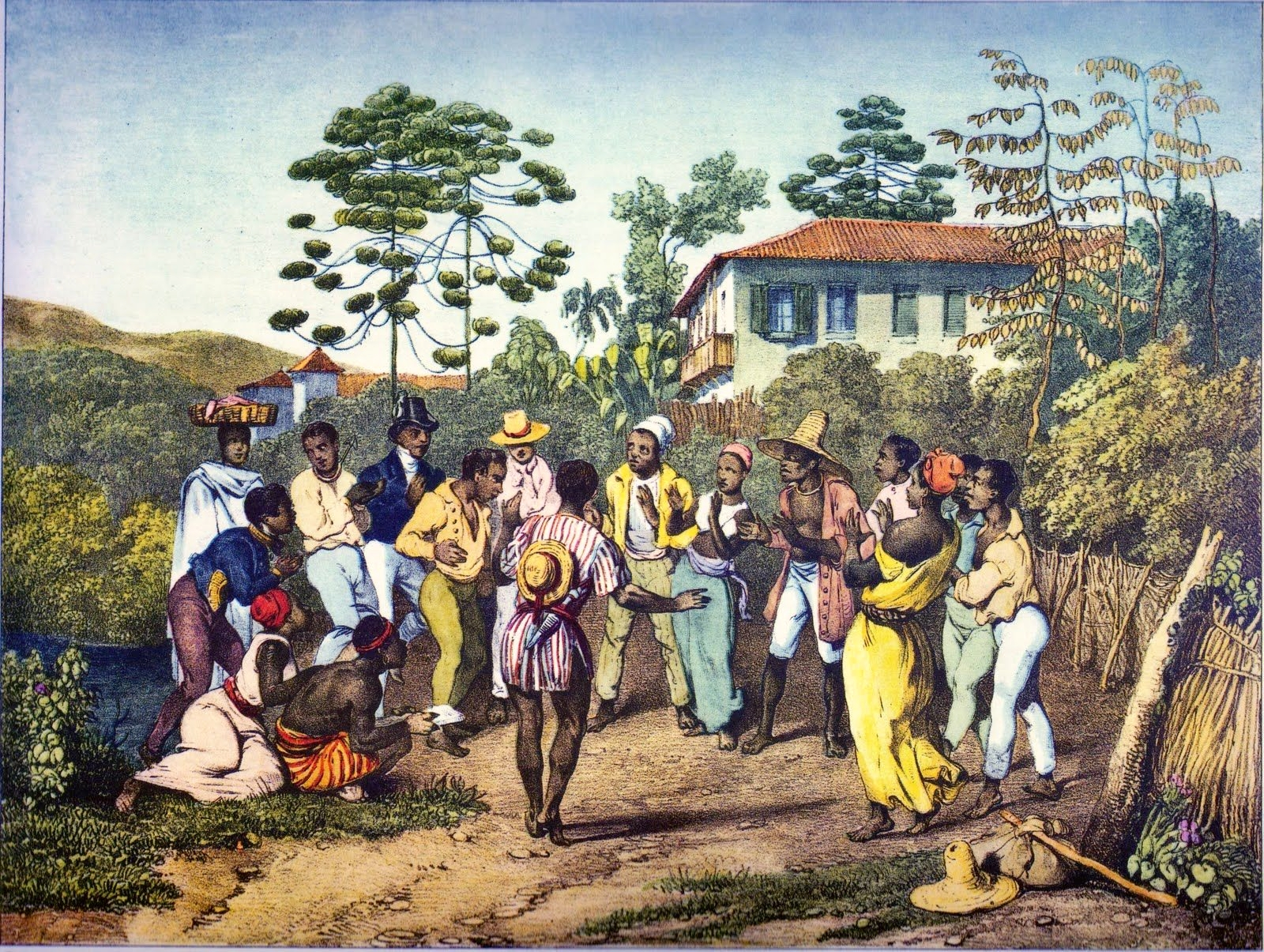
Batucada

Batucada ([batuˈkadɐ]) is a substyle of samba and refers to a percussive style, usually performed by an ensemble, known as a bateria. Batucada music is characterized by its syncopated style and fast pace with a marked rhythm.

Originally from Rio de Janeiro and Bahia, Brazil, the rhythm has become popular around the world and is played specially in carnival festivities and celebrations, and also in street performances many times using big percussionist ensembles for greater impact. In some parts of Spain it has become a popular music, especially in parades and carnivals. During the Chinese New Year celebrations in the city of València, the Batuchina is played, an adaptation of Batucada to Chinese Traditional Music sounds.

== Overview/Instruments ==
The variety of instruments used in a batucada include:

- Repinique, a high-pitched tom-tom like drum played with a single stick (or two long sticks) and the hand. Traditionally the leader of the ensemble uses the repinique (also referred to as 'repique') to direct and solo.
- Surdo, a large drum with an average size of 50 cm in diameter. It provides the downbeat, the bass downbeat of the rhythm. When only one surdo is playing, it accentuates the 2nd and 4th beat of every measure. When a second surdo is playing, it is tuned slightly higher and is played accentuating the first and third beats of the measure. A third surdo de terceira or Surdo-mor syncopates in between the beats.
- Tamborim, a small drum usually played with a stick or a multi-pronged plastic beater.
- Bells (agogô).
- Chocalho (Ganzá, Rocar, and shakers of various types and materials).
- Caixa de guerra, a deeper snare drum w/ wires on batter head and tarol, a thinner snare drum.
- Cuica, a single headed drum with a stick mounted inside the drum body, perpendicular to the head. The instrument is played by rubbing a damp cloth along the length of this stick, while pressing the head of the drum with a finger or thumb. The harder to the stick the finger is pressed, the higher the pitch of the sound is produced. The cuica creates a unique sound, which can sometimes sound like a human voice.
- Timbal, a long cone-like drum that is used to produce both high & low tones in the ensemble. It is usually played with hands and creates a similar timbre as the West African Djembé.
- Pandeiro, similar to a tambourine and played sometimes elaborately with the hand. Unlike the tambourine, the pandeiro can be tuned.
- Reco-reco (known in Spanish as the güiro), a usually hollow wooden instrument with a ridged exterior surface that is scraped with a stick.
- Apito, a small plastic, metal or wooden whistle.

== Songs ==
- Batucada Suite performed by blue-eyed soul singer Teena Marie. Written by Teena Marie from the Album Emerald City.
- The Obvious Child from Paul Simon's album The Rhythm of the Saints is an example of the sound of the samba-Afro style, exemplified by the Bahian samba reggae group Olodum.
- Celebration Suite by Airto Moreira.
- Fanfarra Cabua Lê Lê by Sergio Mendes.
- Portela performed by Pai Benê, Queimou O Pé.
- Batucada Surgiu by Marcos Valle, Sérgio Mendes's cover of which appeared on Look around.
- Samba-Afro style also shown on "El Matador" from the Argentine band Los Fabulosos Cadillacs, a rhythm inspired by Samba-reggae from Bahia, Brazil.
- Kiss of Life by British band Friendly Fires also features a batucada instrumentation in the background playing a funk beat.
- Magalenha by Carlinhos Brown, with Sergio Mendes acting as executive producer.

== See also ==
- Batuque, a Cape Verdean music and dance genre with a similar etymology
- Latin music
- Samba reggae
