= Samba band =

A samba band or samba is a musical ensemble that plays samba music. Samba styled music originates from Brazil.

The rhythm section of a samba band consisting of drums is known as a bateria.

== Instruments ==
A samba band normally consists of tamborims, snare drums (caixa), agogo bells, surdos, ganzás / chocalho (shakers), cuíca, timbal, pandeiro, and the repinique. The band leader often carries a repinique, as well as using apitos (whistles) to signal breaks and calls. Other instruments have been added in many samba bands such as the frigideira, cavaquinho 4-stringed guitars, 7-stringed guitars and a small brass section (trumpets and trombones). As a general rule in Brazil, a samba band must have a group of a minimum of 8 singers with one lead singer to provide the vocal harmony needed to sing the samba-enredo and other forms of samba music.

A big set of samba drums in the UK costs around £300. More expensive sets come with more drums enabling more players to join; a convenience due to how many would usually take place in the orchestra.

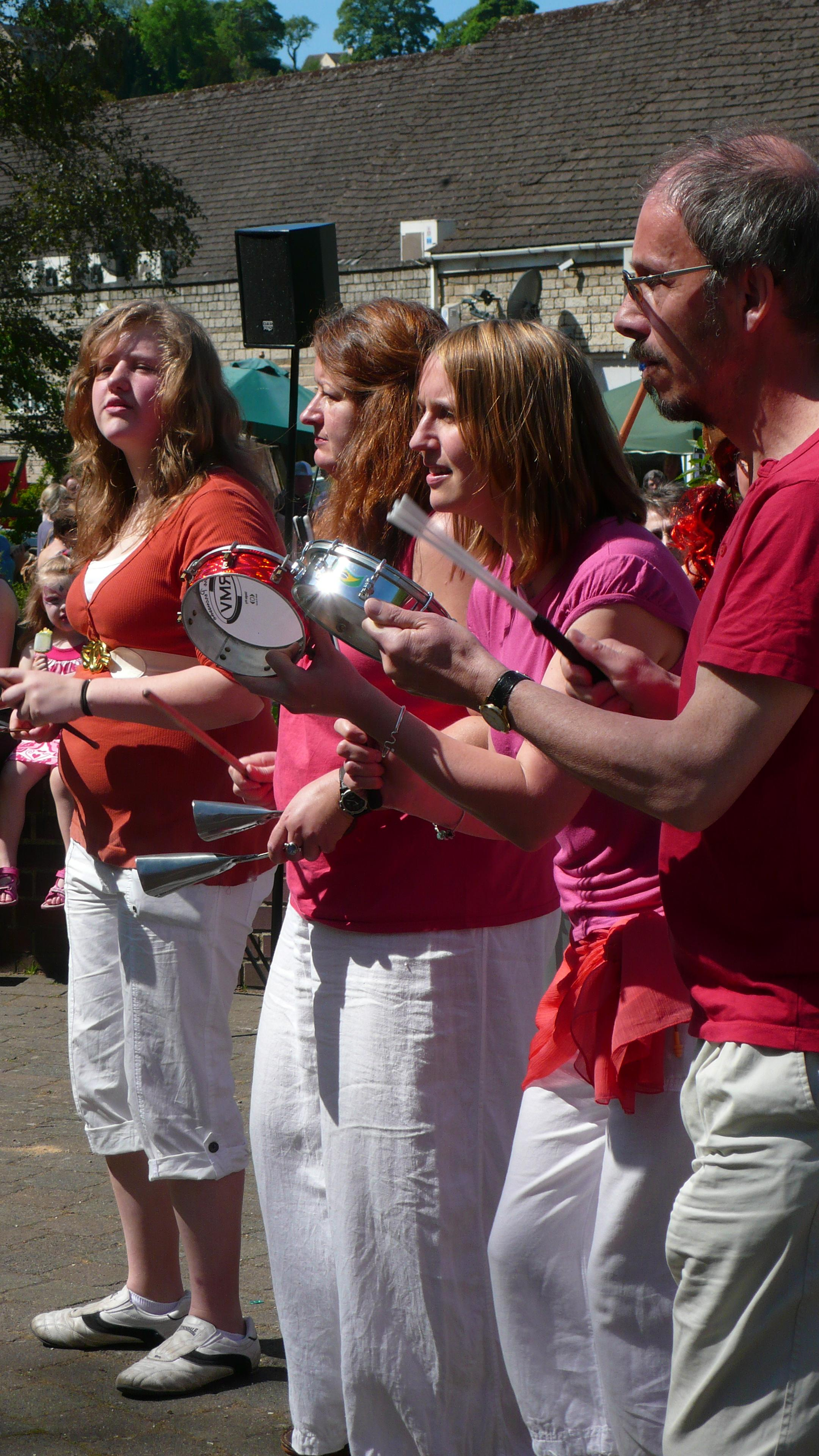
Tamborims and agogôs

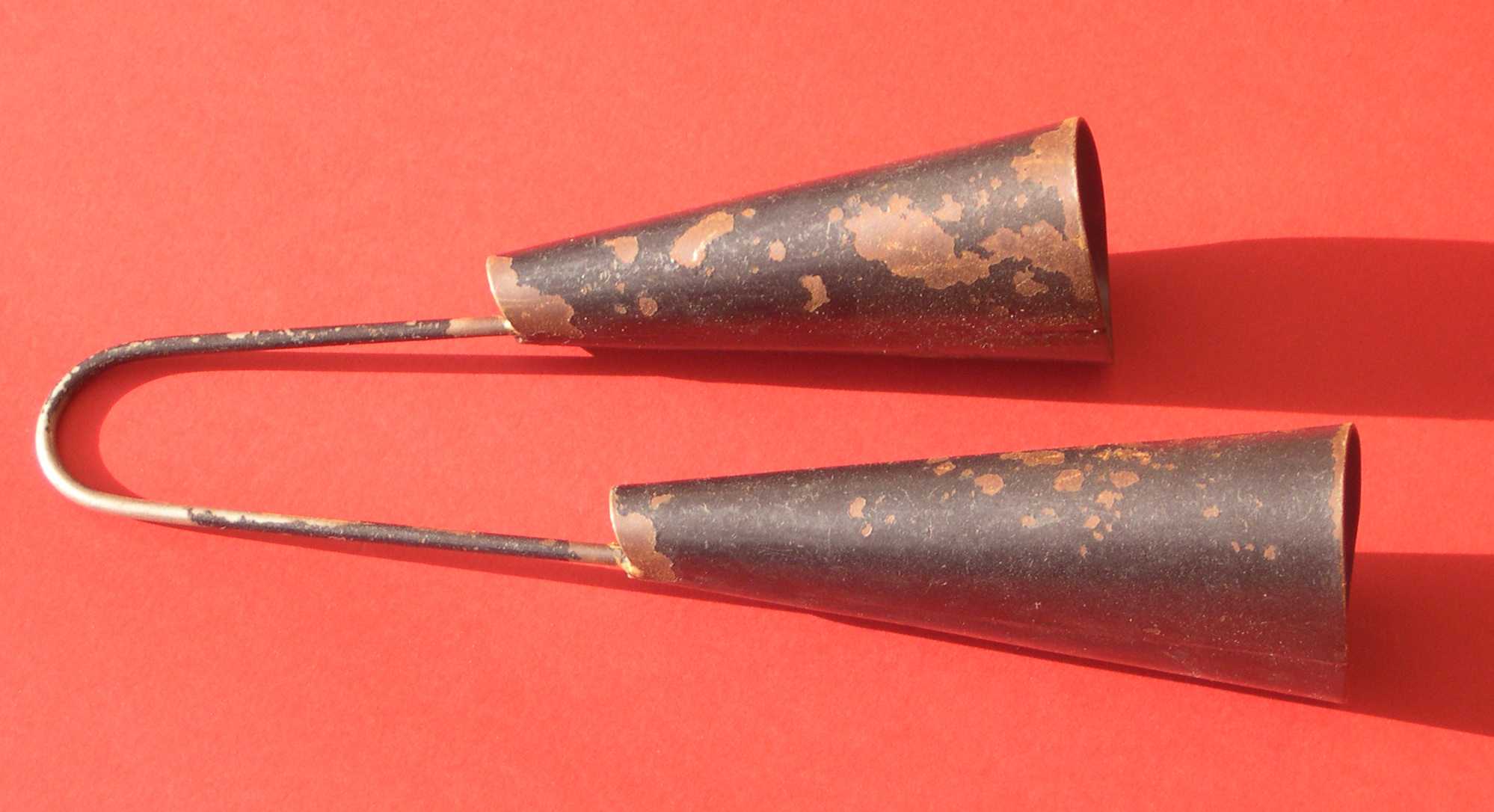
Agogôs

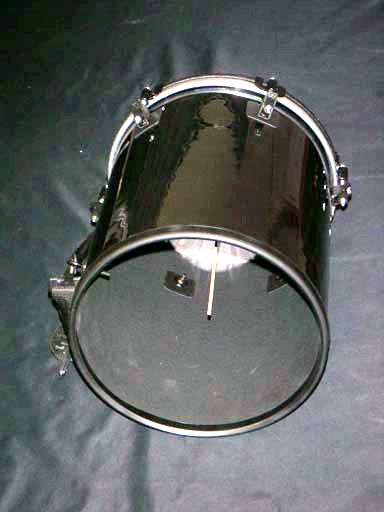
Cuíca

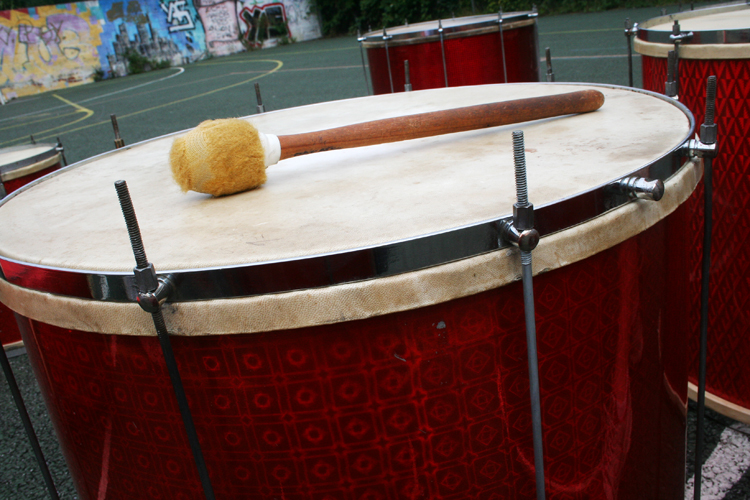
A surdo

== Music ==
In America, bands traditionally play samba (carnival rhythms of the samba schools of Rio de Janeiro). In other countries, they now play reggae, funk, hip hop and Brazilian folk music. Like other drumming bands, the music exceeds 130 decibels but often this attracts listeners. Some samba bands have eccentric costumes whilst others have costumes themed around their religions/animals.

== Bands ==
Thousands of bands have been formed in countries outside Brazil. These often appear in schools but many are run by samba organisations. They are a good form of music education as they do not require music reading as the music is recalled aurally.

== See also ==
- Samba
