= Caxirola =

Brazilian percussion instrument created by Carlinhos Brown

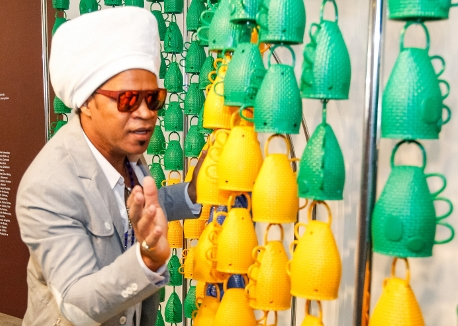
- Carlinhos Brown and some caxirolas
- Classification: Hand percussion, idiophone

Related instruments
- Caxixi; Cabasa; Maracas

Musicians
- Carlinhos Brown

The caxirola (pronounced [kaʃiˈɾɔlɐ]) is a Brazilian percussion instrument created by Carlinhos Brown and consisting of a closed plastic basket with a flat-bottom filled with small synthetic particles, in an attempt to create a sustainable product. It was based on the caxixi, and thus it is also an indirectly struck idiophone, sounded by shaking. The caxirola was certified on September 27, 2012, by the Brazilian Ministry of Sports and was created to be the official musical instrument of the 2014 FIFA World Cup in Brazil. However, it was not allowed inside stadiums of both the World Cup and the 2013 FIFA Confederations Cup as the government considered it a security risk.

== Background and concept ==
Carlinhos Brown has expressed concern about the potential unpleasing sound of the official instrument of the Cup, as it happened with the vuvuzelas of the previous tournament. According to him, "the caxirola respects the sound limits. It reproduces sounds of nature, of the sea, because of that, we worked with the best acoustic engineers so that the sound was nice, pleasant." "Researchers at Brazil's Federal University of Santa Maria determined .. that it would take 30,000 caxirolas to produce the same sound pressure level as a single vuvuzela."

Brown also said Aldo Rebelo and FIFA representatives followed the creation of the instrument closely, and it is now part of the official licensed products of FIFA.

The instrument was presented at the opening of a festival called "O Olhar que Ouve" (The Look that Hears), made up of 19 works of art by Brown. The caxirolas were tested by Brazilian president Dilma Rousseff, who claimed they were "more beautiful than the vuvuzelas".

She also stated:

Carlinhos [Brown] is an author and a great artist. And he expresses a diverse world, but very specific, of Brazil, and specially of Bahia. The plurality, the fact that this world has a million aspects. [...] It delights us because he combines this green and yellow image of the caxirola, this fact that we are talking about a green plastic, about a country that has the lead of sustainability of the world and at the same time it is an object capable of doing two things: combining images with sounds and take us to goals.

== Controversies ==
In March 2013, FIFA tried to forbid the usage of the instrument during games, claiming it could be used as a weapon or as a method of publicity. The instruments resemble the shape and design of hand grenades. Indeed, during the derby between Salvador's two biggest clubs, Bahia and Vitória on 28 April 2013, the first match in which the caxirola was given to the public, Bahia supporters threw hundreds of them on the field of Arena Fonte Nova as a result of their team's 5–1 loss to their rivals.

In late May 2013, it was confirmed by José Eduardo Cardozo, Brazilian Minister of Justice, that the instrument would not be allowed into stadiums during both football events to take place in Brazil in 2013 and 2014.

The instrument was met with criticism by people who work towards the preservation of traditional cultures of Brazil, claiming that the caxirola is nothing but a copy of caxixi, simply adding slots for the fingers (such as brass knuckles) and that the native and ancient cultures of Brazil should be recognized as the true creators of the instruments and, as such, be benefited with that.

We are against the registration of this object by the private sector without the benefit of the traditional communities that created the original instruments. It's necessary to better discuss the matter of intellectual property and how to compensate the traditional peoples for such initiatives.

— Josilene Magalhães, substitute director of the Department of Protection of the Afro-Brazilian Patrimony of Palmares Foundation
