= Shaker (musical instrument) =

Indirect struck idiophone musical instrument

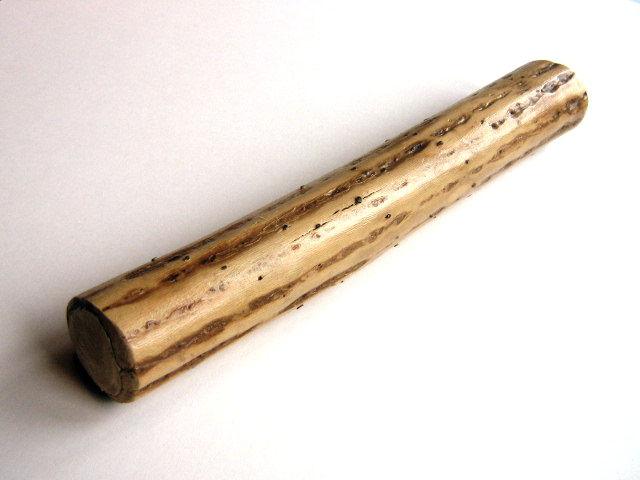
A rainstick, one type of shaker

The word shaker describes various Percussive musical instruments used for creating rhythm in music.

They are called shakers because the method of creating the sound involves shaking them – moving them back and forth in the air rather than striking them. Most may also be struck for a greater accent on certain beats. Shakers are often used in rock and other popular styles of music to provide the ride pattern along with or substituting for the ride cymbal.

== Types of shaker ==
A shaker may comprise a container, partially full of small loose objects such as beans, which create the percussive sounds as they collide with each other, the inside surface, or other fixed objects inside the container – as in a rainstick, caxixi, or egg shaker.

== See also ==
- Hand percussion
