= Egg shaker =

Hand percussion instrument

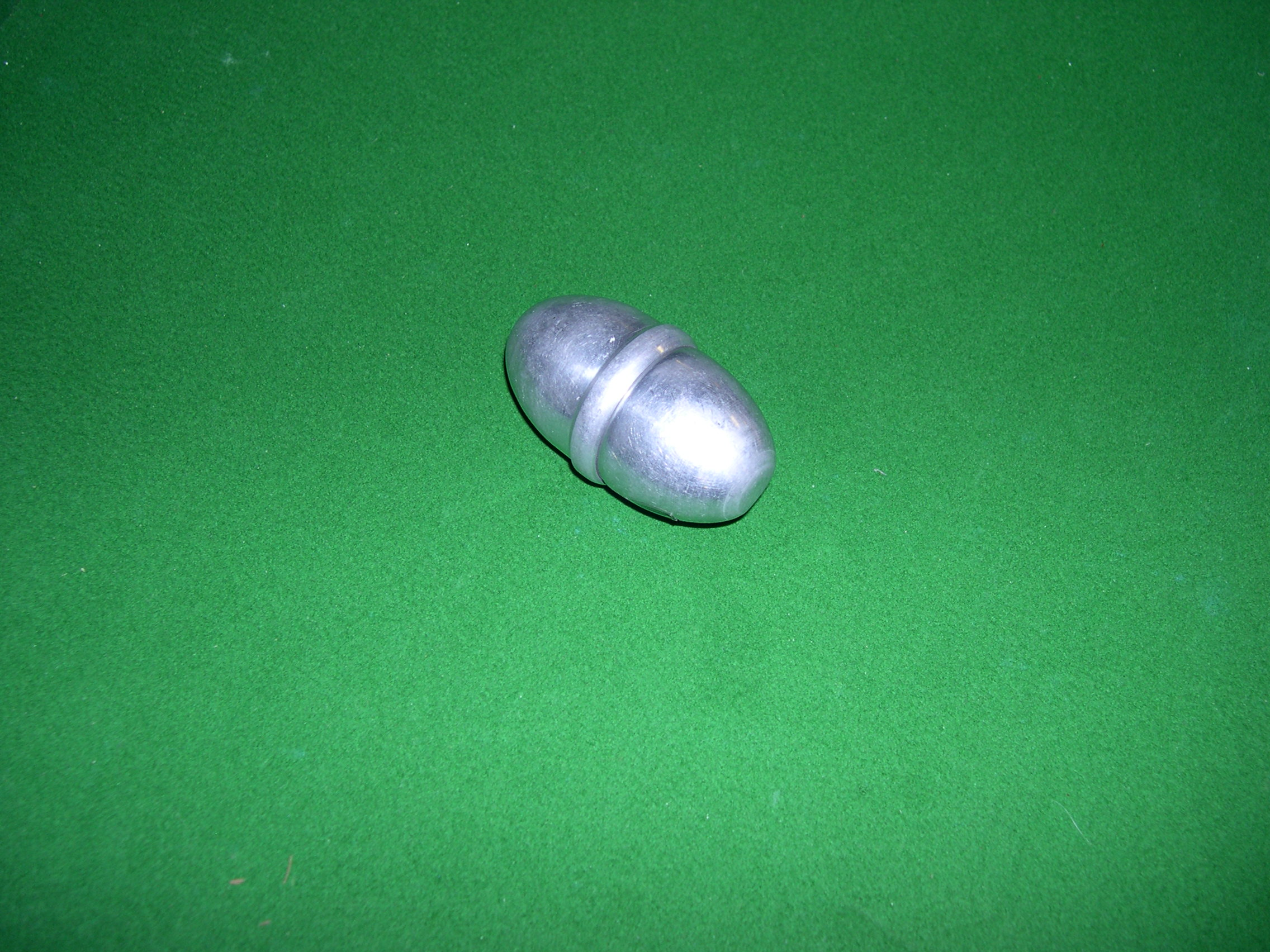

Listening example of four different egg shakers

Egg shaker solo

An egg shaker or ganzá is a hand percussion instrument, in the idiophone category, that makes a noise when shaken. Functionally it is similar to a maraca. Typically the outer casing or container is ovoidal or egg-shaped. It is partially full of small, loose objects, such as seeds or beads, which create the percussive sounds as they collide, both with each other and with the inside surface of the container. The egg shaker is a Latin American instrument, cheap to buy and relatively simple to play.

== Playing styles ==
The egg shaker can be played in a number of ways. It can be shaken up and down to create a fast percussion line or from side to side creating a slightly different sound. It is used alongside other instruments like maracas, but also in samba groups and mariachi bands using instruments such as the drumkit, piano, saxophone, bass guitar, violin, the vihuela, guitarrón, trumpet, occasionally acoustic guitar or electric guitar, and the voice.

== Construction ==
The egg shaker is created with a plastic mould, the main shape created in two halves. One half is filled with metal beads or seeds and then both halves are fitted together. Another sound can be made by holding the shaker in the palm of the hand tightly, then opening it whilst shaking it up and down. This makes a whirling sound not possible with other percussion instruments.

== Availability ==
Egg shakers are available in a number of colours, and are sold in most music shops at a reasonably low price, due to the use of inexpensive materials like plastic and seeds. They are often sold in packets alongside other similar percussion instruments such as maracas, tambourines, finger cymbals etc.
