= Hand percussion =

Type of percussion instrument

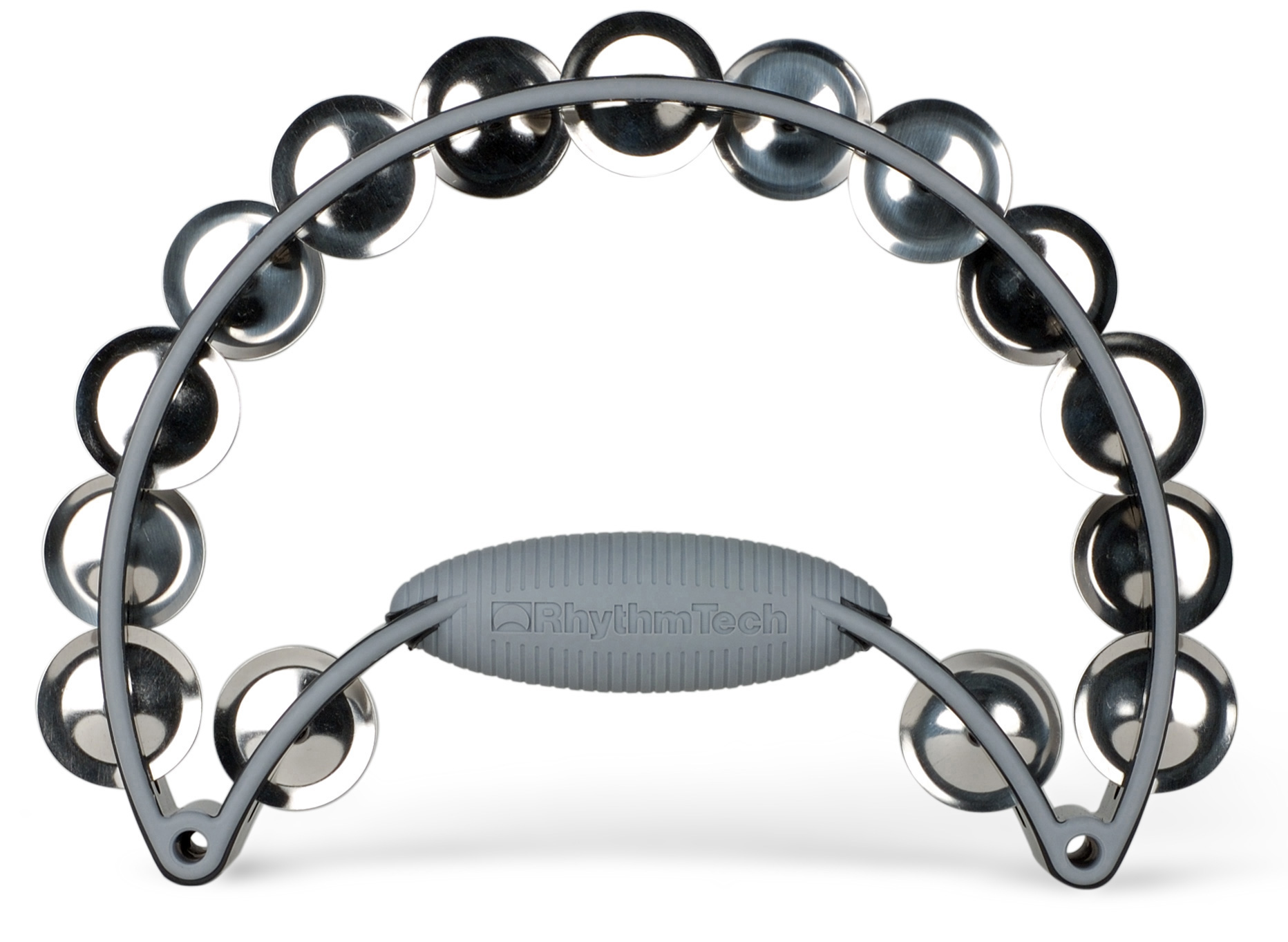
Modern half moon tambourine

Modern Tambourine
Half moon tambourine rhythms

Hand percussion is a percussion instrument that is held in the hand. They can be made from wood, metal or plastic, and are usually shaken, scraped, or tapped with fingers or a stick. It includes all instruments that are not drums, or any instrument that is a pitched percussion instrument, such as the marimba or the xylophone.

== Types ==
=== Shakers ===
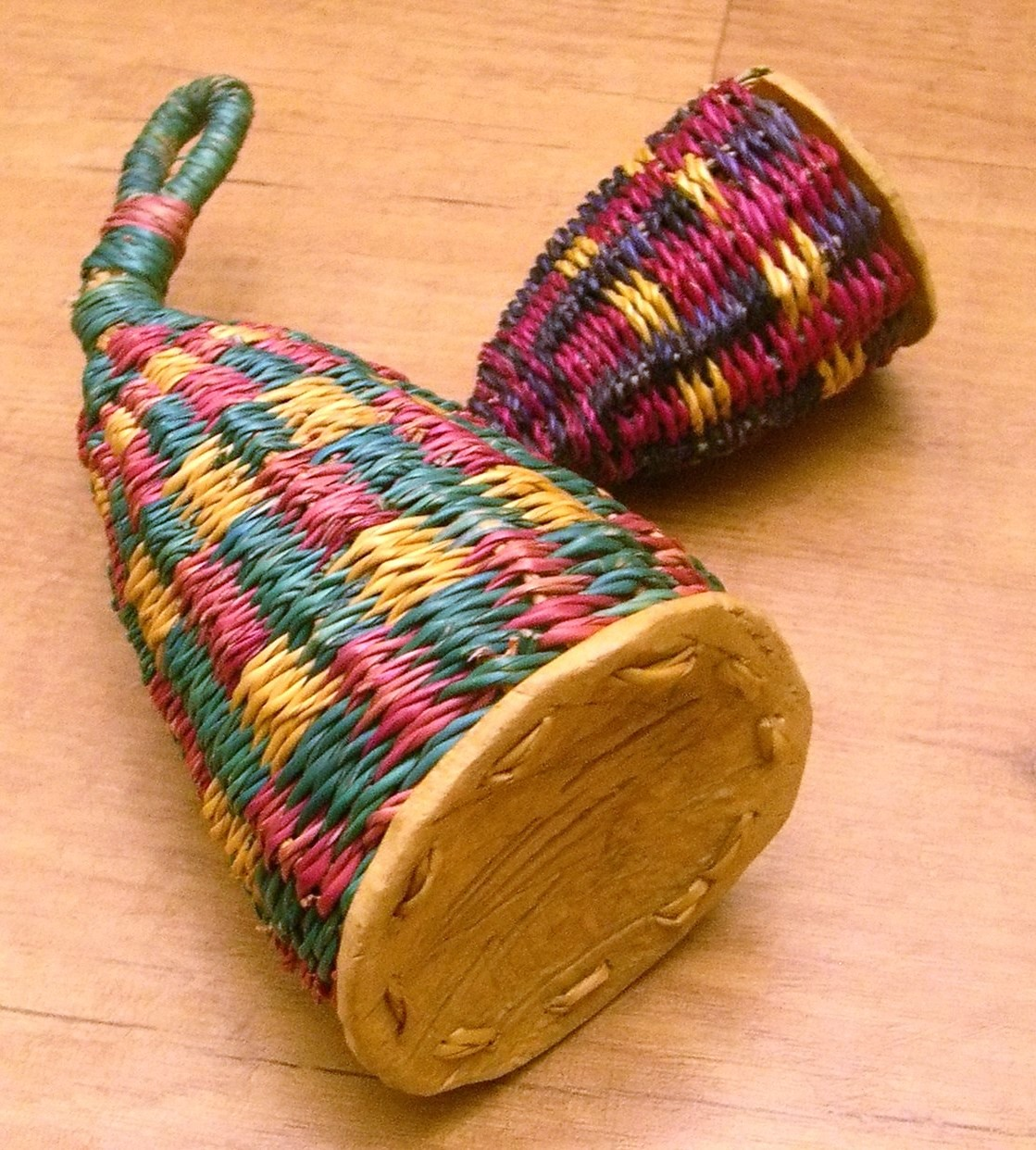
Caxixi from Africa

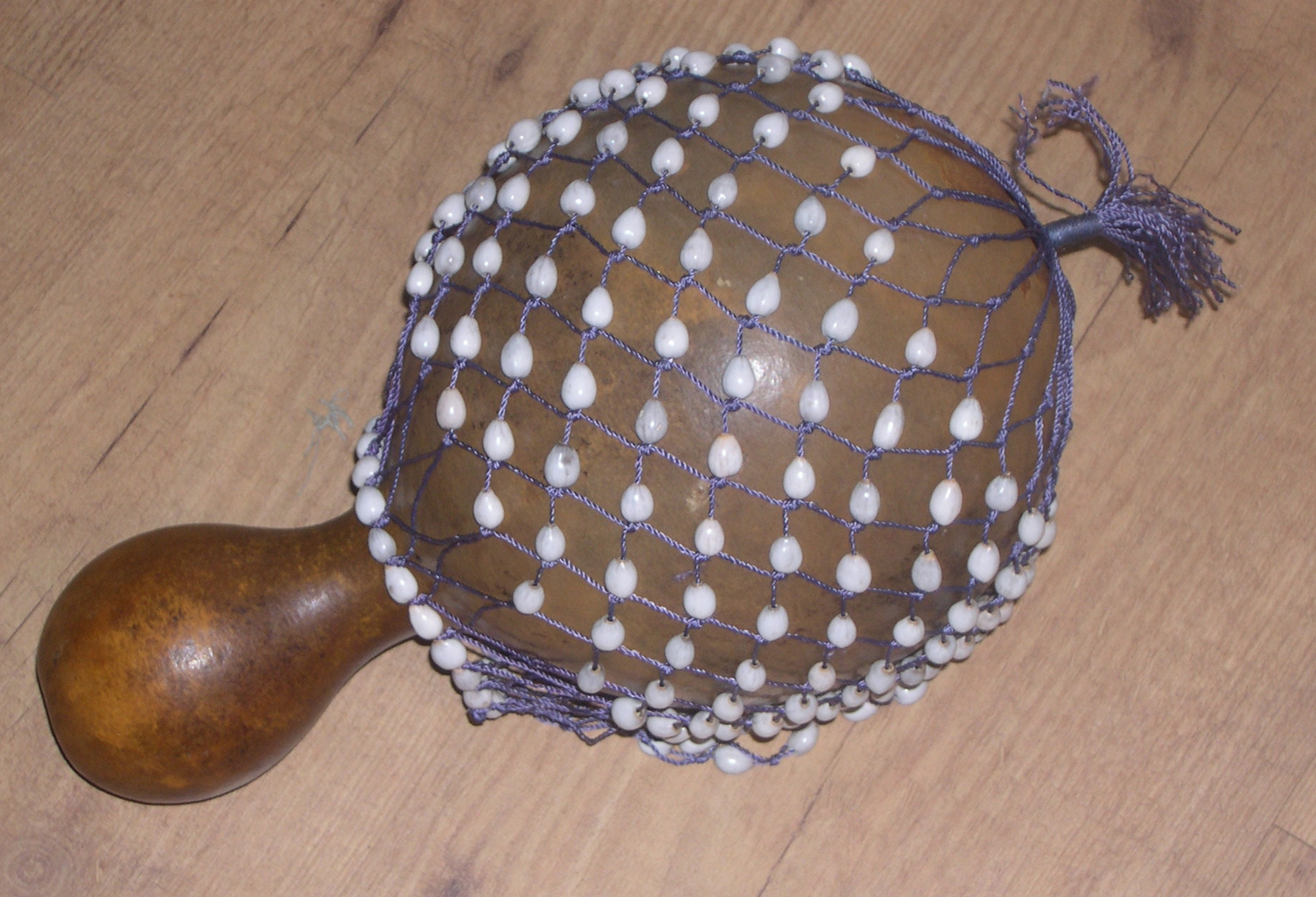
Gourd shekere from Africa with seeds in the net.

A shaker (percussion) is any instrument that sounds when shaken. Historically, naturally occurring items such as seed pots were the first shakers. A caxixi is a basketwork shaker made from a gourd. Gourds are used all over the world, covered with a net with shells or seeds to create an instrument such as the shekere. Modern shakers are often cylinders made from metal, wood, or plastic containing small hard items such as seeds, stones, or plastic - an example is the egg shaker. Another category of shaken instrument uses jingles, discs of metal tap together when shaken. Tambourines also fall into this category, using several zills to produce their sound.

Shekere
Basic groove on shekere

Caxixi
Large and small caxixi played together

=== Scrapers ===
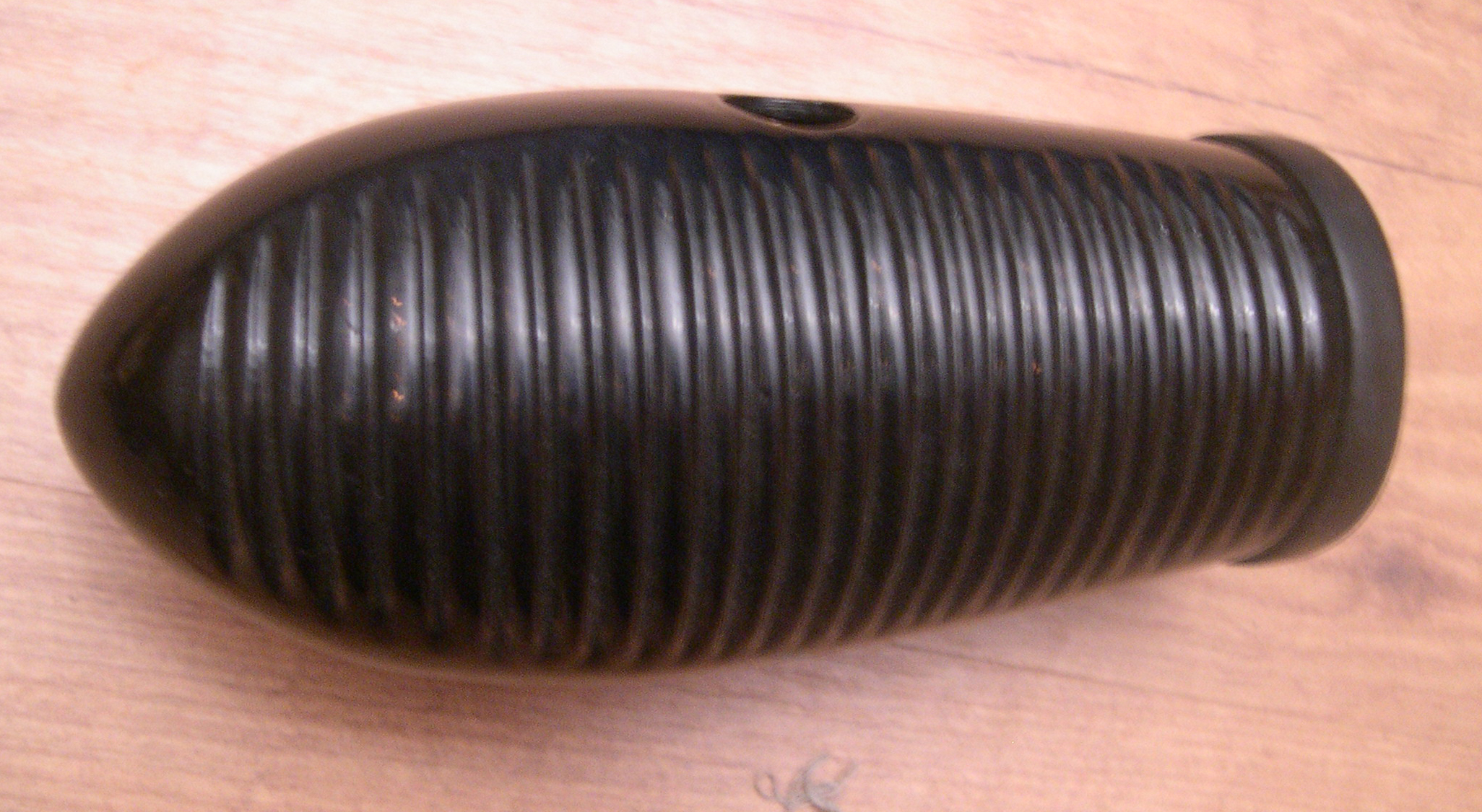
Modern fibreglass güiro from South America

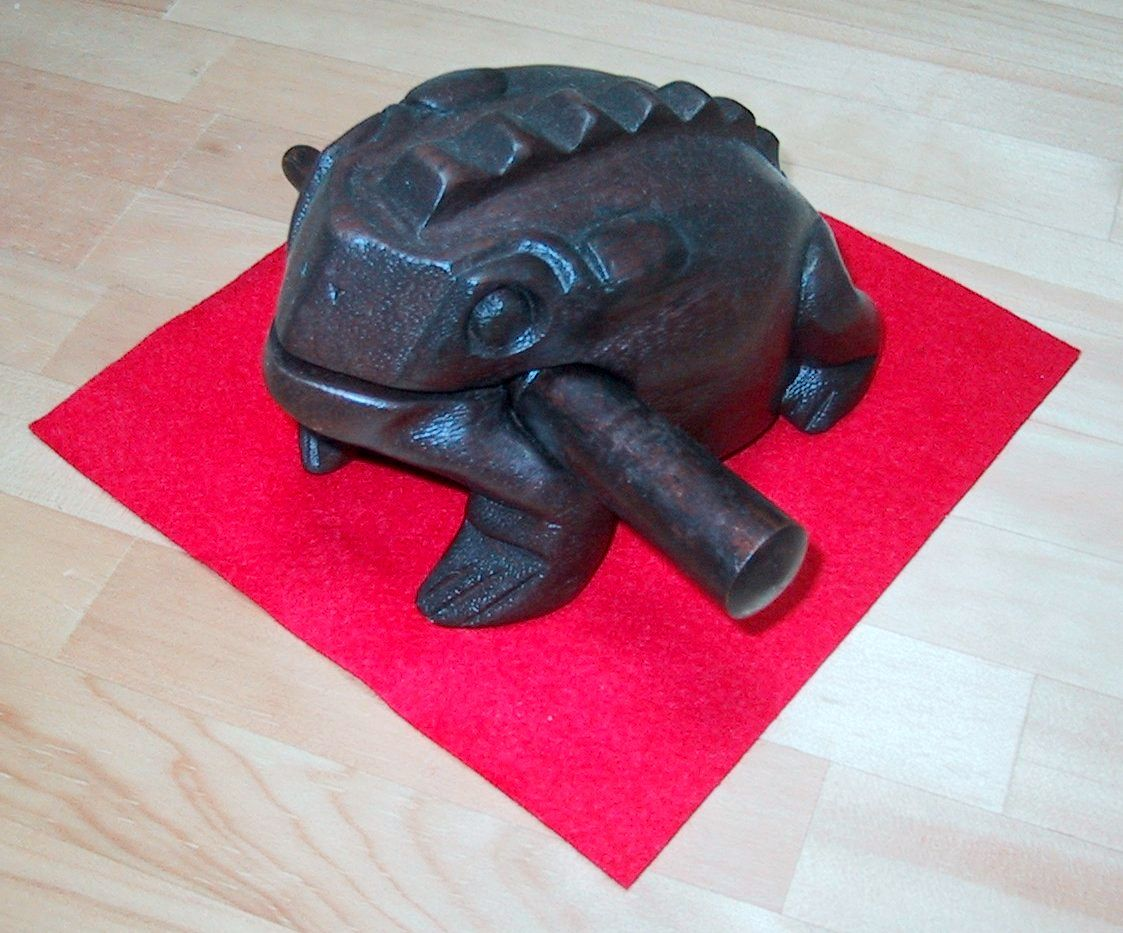
Frog shaped güiro from Japan

Scrapers have ridges on the body. Often known as Guiro, rhythms are created by running a thin stick up and down the ridges at different speeds. Gourds or bamboo have traditionally been used as Guiros, as they have a resonant hollow body, and can easily be cut with ridges. A common type from Asia is a carved wooden frog with ridges cut on its back and its mouth and belly hollowed out.

Modern Guiro
Sounds of the guiro

=== Cowbells ===
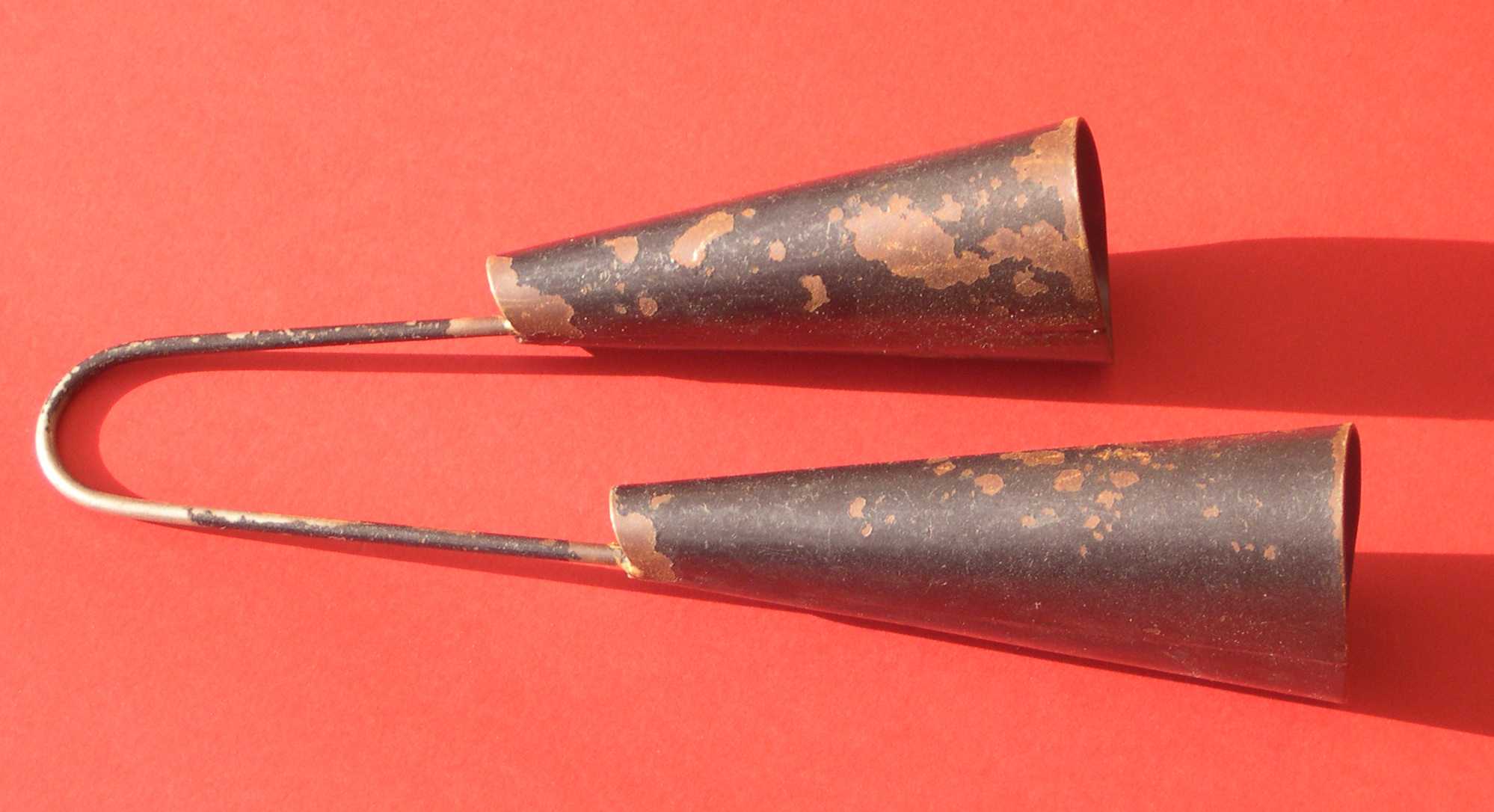
Modern agogo bell

Cowbells originate from the bells tied around the necks of livestock. They are any type of bell tapped with fingers, or with a beater. They are found all over the world and are used extensively in Latin percussion and often found as part of a standard rock drum kit. The name cowbell usually refers to a single bell, the Agogô bell usually refers to a double or triple bell.

Modern agogo
modern agogo rhythm pattern

Cowbell
Cowbell pattern

=== Triangles ===
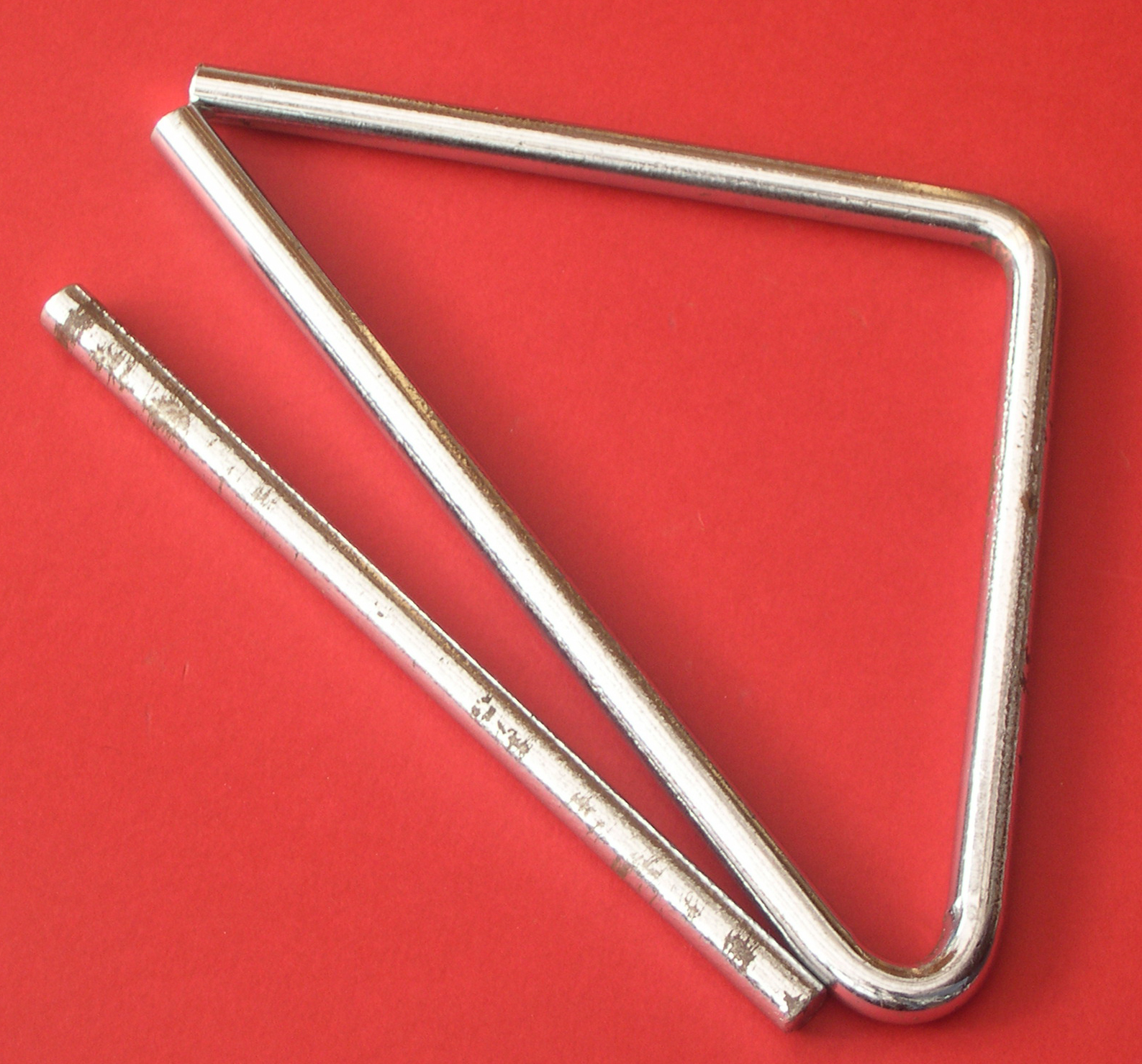
A modern triangle

The triangle is a piece of metal bent in the shape of a triangle that is struck with a metal beater. It is generally suspended by a string to allow it to resonate. The performer's hand can open or close to mute the sound. Triangles are commonly used in South American music to give a persistent high pitched pulse.

Latin style triangle
A triangle played latin style, opening and closing the hand for rhythmic effect.

=== Sticks ===
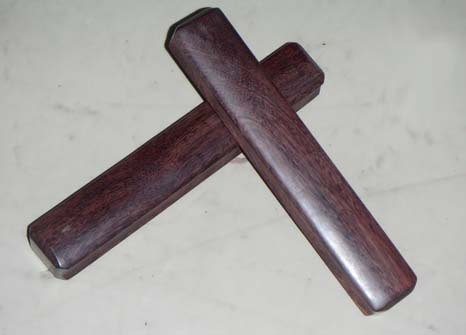
A pair of claves

Tapping two sticks together is the simplest form of hand percussion, and has developed a place in traditional music all over the world. Indigenous Australians use clapping sticks alongside the didgeridoo, and claves are an integral part of South American music.

Claves
Clave pattern

=== Small drums ===
A variety of small hand held drums such as tamborim fall into the Hand Percussion category.
