= Ganzá =

Brazilian rattle percussion instrument

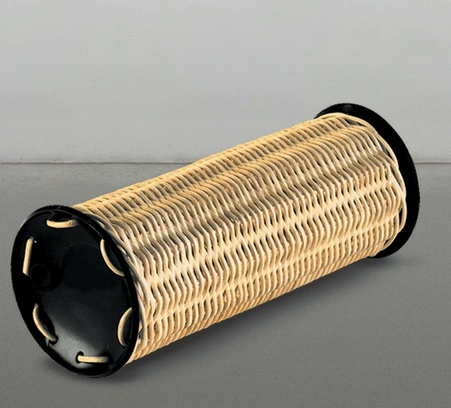
- A ganzá

Percussion
- Classification: Percussion
- Hornbostel–Sachs classification: 112 (Indirectly struck idiophones)

Related instruments
- Caxixi; Chocalho

The ganzá (Portuguese pronunciation: [ɡɐ̃ˈza]) is a Brazilian rattle used as a percussion instrument, especially in samba music.

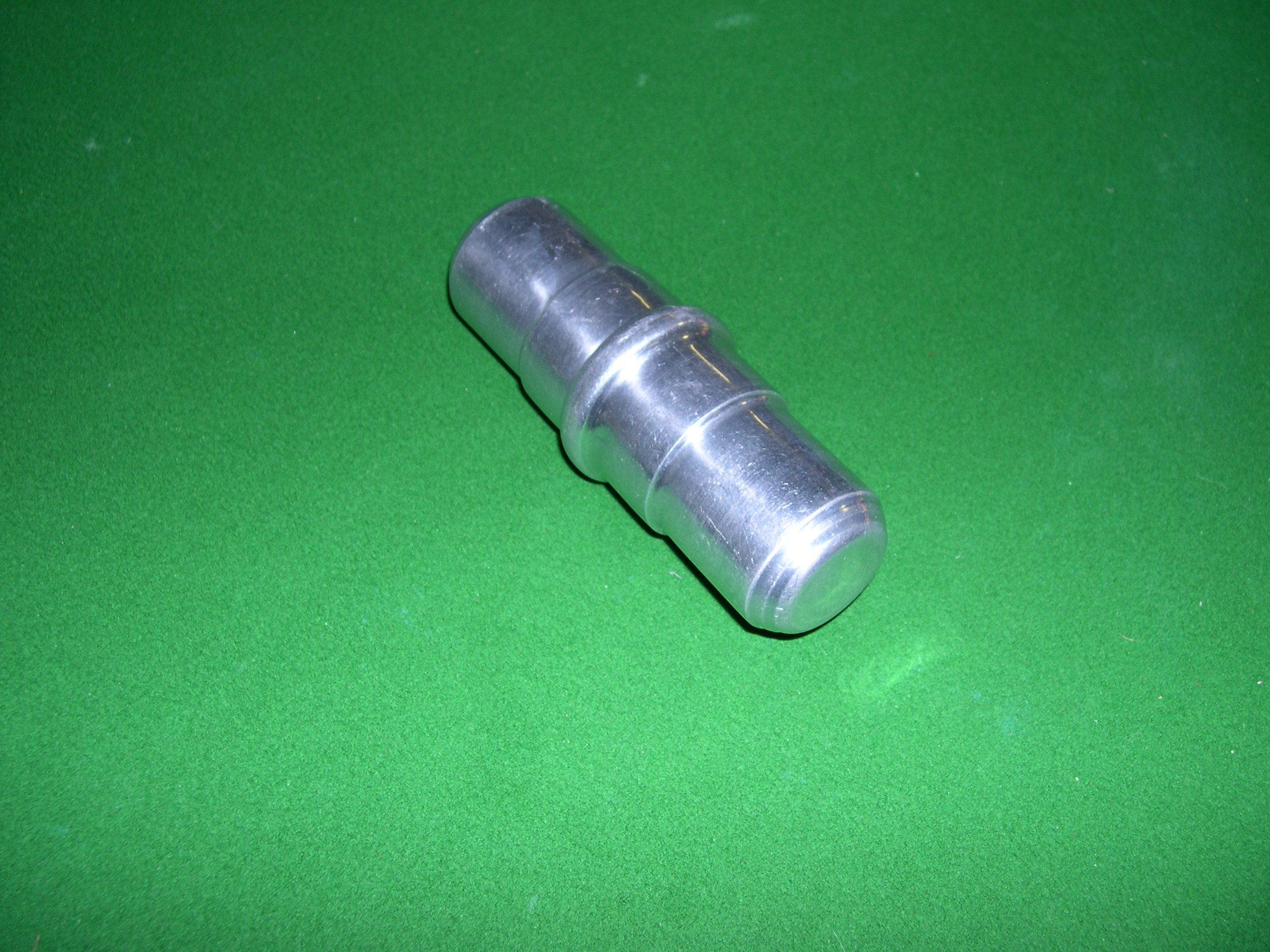
A metal ganzá.

The ganzá is cylindrically shaped and can be either a hand-woven basket or a metal canister which is filled with beads, metal balls, pebbles, or other similar items. Those made from metal produce a particularly loud sound. They are usually used to play a rhythm underneath the rest of the band.

It is usually included in the Brazilian Samba as an undertone.

The ganzá is classified as an indirectly struck idiophone.

== See also ==
- Caxixi
- Chocalho
- Afoxé
