= Chocalho =

Generic name for "shaker" in Portuguese

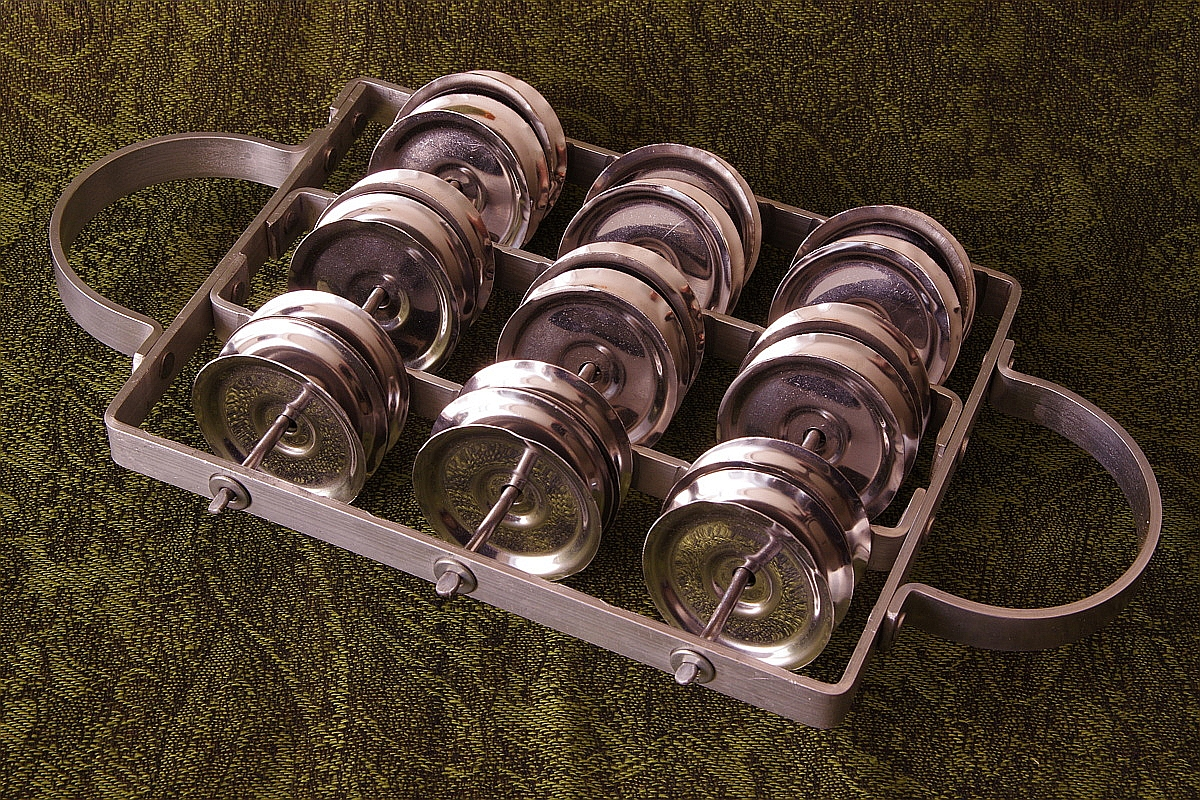
- A small chocalho

Percussion instrument
- Classification: hand percussion
- Hornbostel–Sachs classification: 112.112 (Stick rattles)

Related instruments
- Shaker

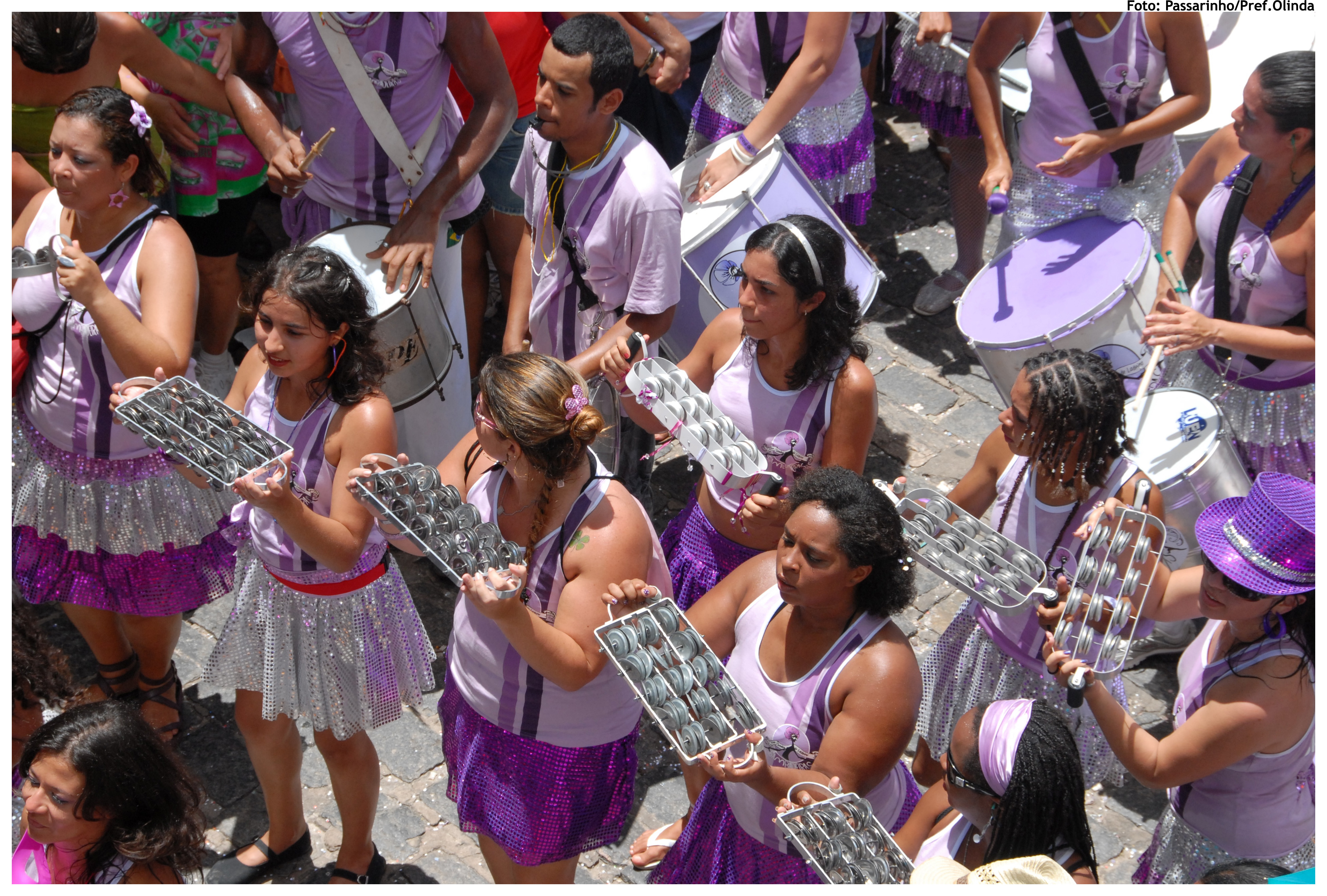
Musicians playing chocalho in a Samba school parade

"Chocalho" is the generic name for "shaker" in Portuguese. There are various types of idiophones using this name in Portuguese, not always being the same instrument:

- a shaker;
- a kind of jingle stick used to play samba music;
- a cowbell.

Chocalhos are typically used as a support to the sound of the caixas, to sustain the rhythm in the bateria. This instrument consists of an aluminum or wooden frame with a number of rows, each carrying pairs of jingles (platinelas). The chocalho is played by shaking it back and forth and pumping the arms up and down.
