= Groupe de Recherches et d'Echanges Technologiques =

Groupe de Recherches et d'Echanges Technologiques (GRET) (French, Group For Research and Technology Exchanges) is a non-governmental association supporting international cooperation, professional solidarity and poverty reduction in the countries of Asia, Africa, Europe and Latin America. It was established in the late 1970s.

Its activities include implementation of field projects, expertise, studies, research, running information and exchange networks. The main spheres of attention are:

- Access to Essential Services
- Sustainable Food and Agriculture
- Institutional Development, Actors, Territories
- Information and Communication for Development
- Microfinance and Small Enterprise
- Public Policies and International Regulations.

The Association is financed mainly by the European Union, the World Bank, the French Ministry of Foreign Affairs, the French Development Agency and also by the Asian Development Bank, Unicef, USAID and many others. The turnover in 2004 was 12,901,040 euro, of which about 40% was spent on Africa and the Indian Ocean and 15% on Asia.
