= Bateria =

Form of Brazilian samba band

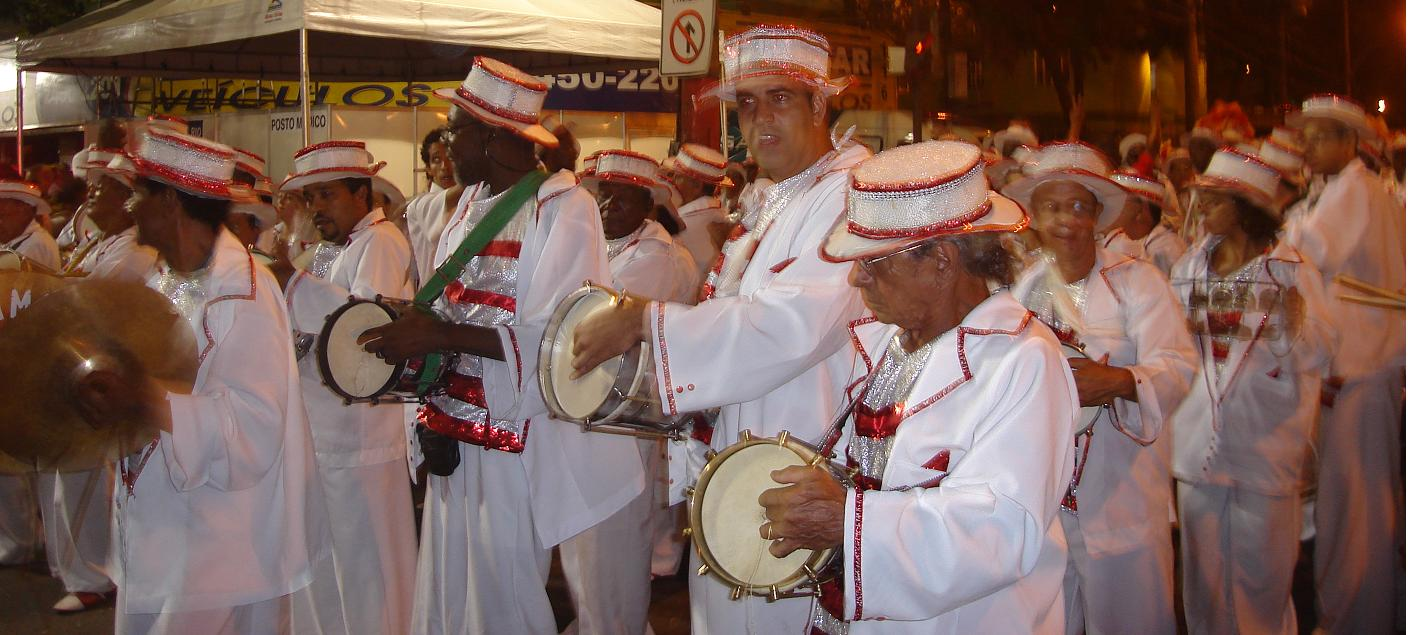
Acadêmicos do Engenho da Rainha Bateria, samba school parade, 2010.

The term bateria means “drum kit” in Portuguese and Spanish. In Brazil, the word is also used for a form of Brazilian samba band, the percussion band or rhythm section of a Samba School.

Baterias are also used to accompany the Brazilian martial art, capoeira.

== Instruments ==
- Surdo (a large, low-tuned drum, the heartbeat of the samba)
- Caixa de guerra (a snare drum)
- Tarol (drum) (a smaller snare drum)
- Repinique (a small drum, twelve by fourteen inches)
- Chocalho (a rattle, made up of rows of jingles)
- Tamborim (a frame drum played with a flexible beater)
- Agogô (a double cow bell)
- Reco-reco (a notched stick played with a scraper)
- Pandeiro (a tambourine)
- Cuíca (a hollow drum-like instrument containing a bamboo stick that is rubbed to produce a squeaky sound)
- Apito (a whistle)
- Clash cymbals
- Bass drums (optional and in some samba school drum lines)

== See also ==
- Torcida Jovem of Santos FC School Bateria Samba

== Sources and external links ==
- Torcida Jovem of Santos FC School of Samba
- BateristasPT.com — Portuguese drummers community website
- "Samba Bateria Definition & terms" — Photos, videos & origins of the bateria terminology within the samba-schools environment at Brazil's carnival
- "Hello, Bateria!" — introduction by Marinilda Carvalho, provided by sambaparty.com
- Sounds of baterias — The Brazilian Percussion Site
- A baterias website in Spanish — A large community of drummers in Latin America
- Play yourself a samba school drums section — An animation that lets you conduct the samba
