= Caxixi =

Percussion instrument

Caxixis
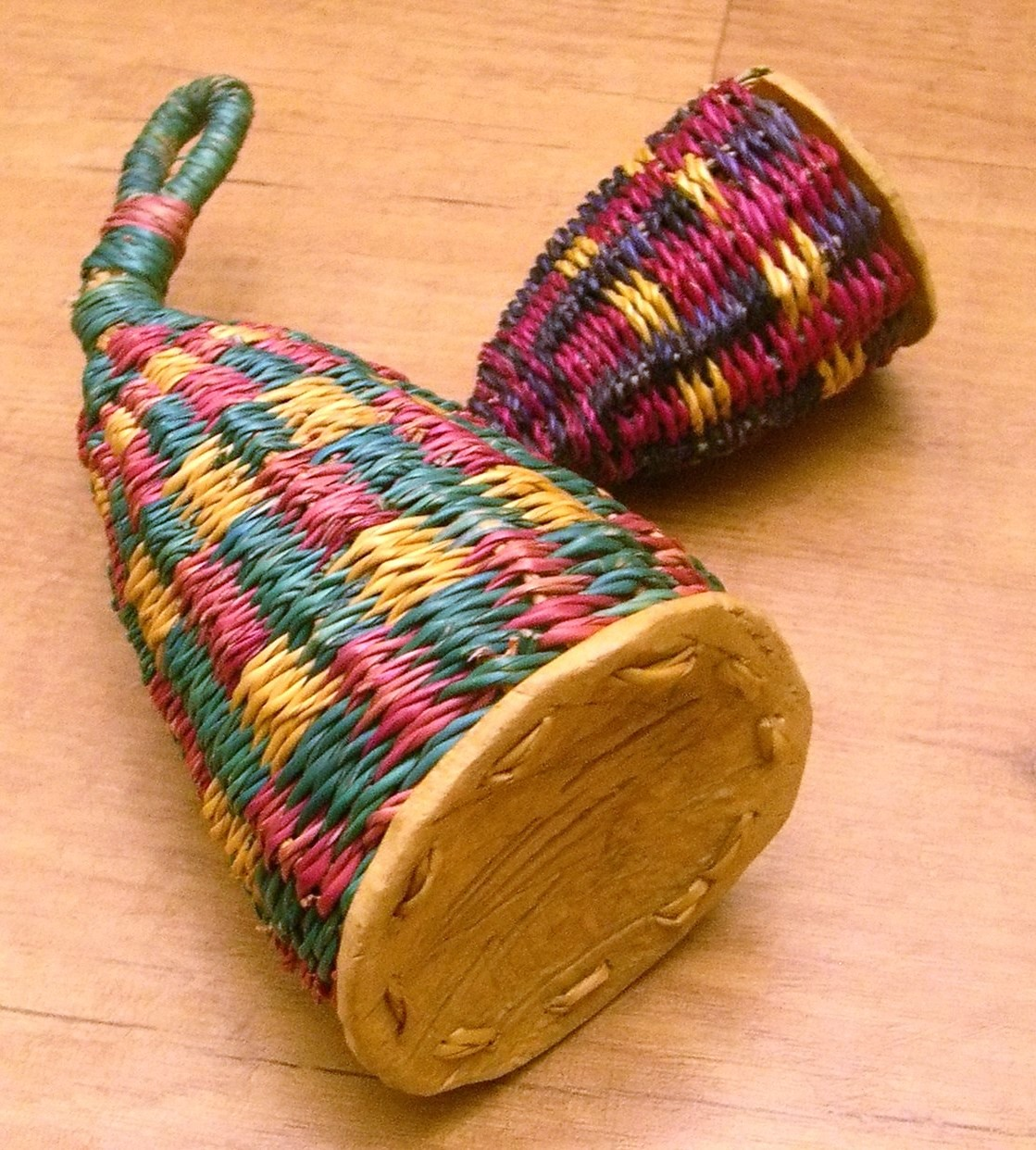
- Classification: Hand percussion, idiophone, basketweave and gourd.

Related instruments
- Shekere, Maraca

A caxixi (pronounced [kaˈʃiʃi]) is a percussion instrument consisting of a closed basket with a flat bottom filled with seeds or other small particles. The round bottom is traditionally cut from a dried gourd. The caxixi is an indirectly struck idiophone. Like the maraca, it is sounded by shaking. Variations in sound are produced by varying the angle at which the caxixi is shaken, determining whether the contents strike the reed basket (softer sound) or the hard bottom (louder, sharper sound).

It is found across Africa and South America, but mainly in Brazil and Cuba, used in staging the ritual. In Brazil, the smaller-sized caxixi began to be played alongside the berimbau. The larger sized caxixi were first used on recordings by Airto Moreira, but it was Naná Vasconcelos who furthered the use of caxixi for rhythmic accompaniment and colors. In West Africa, it is used by singers and often alongside drummers. Natives believed the caxixi to summon good enchanted spirits and to ward off evil ones.

More modern caxixis are made out of metal and have a more cutting sound as a result.

Caxixi
Large and small caxixi played together

== See also ==
- Caxirola, a derivative of the caxixi
