= Tamborim =

Percussion instrument

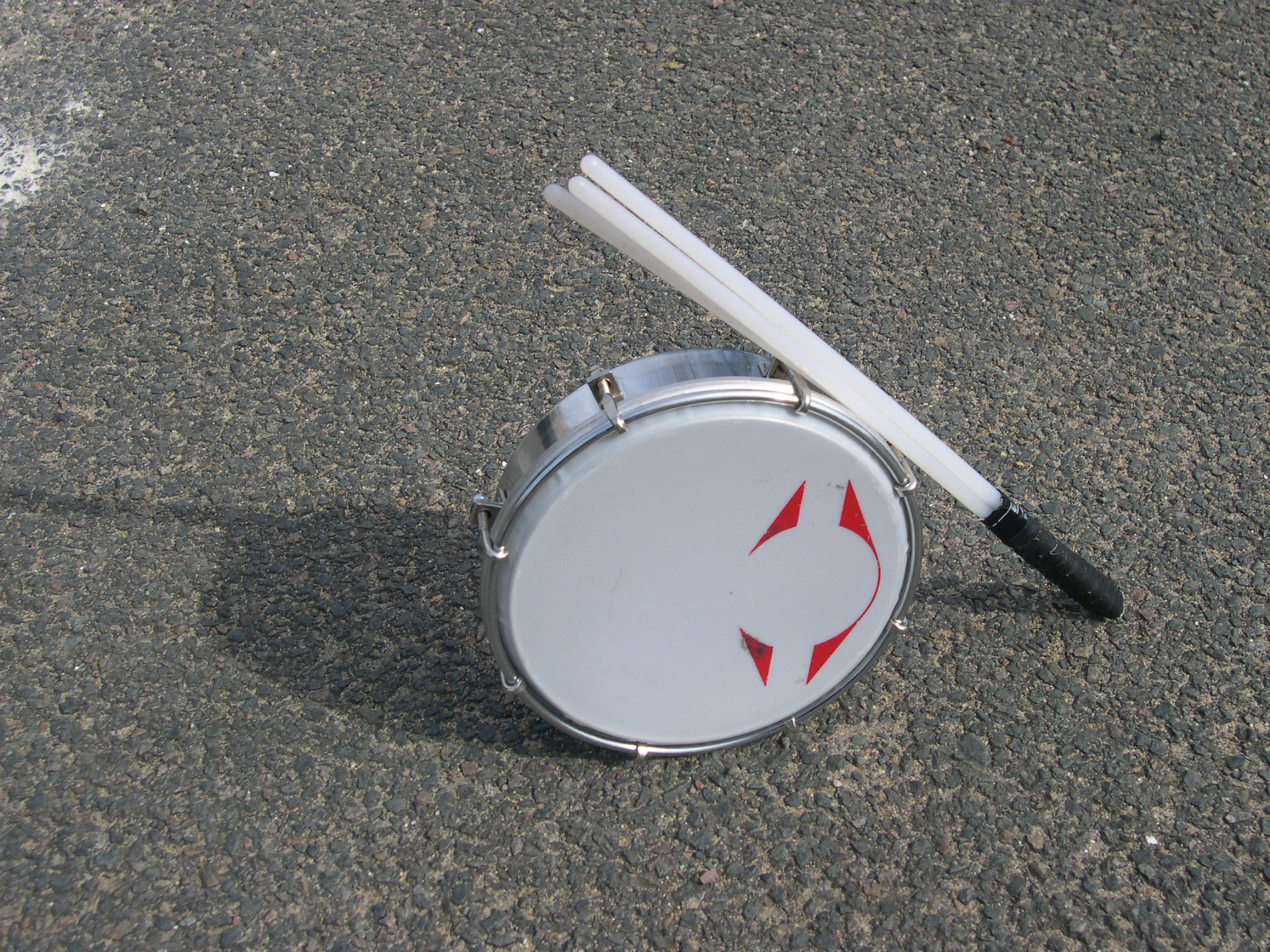
- Tamborim and beater

Percussion instrument
- Classification: Frame drum
- Hornbostel–Sachs classification: 211.311 (Directly struck membranophone)

A tamborim (Portuguese pronunciation: [tɐ̃boˈɾĩ] or [tɐ̃buˈɾĩ]) is a small round Brazilian frame drum, developed from other similar percussion instruments brought by the Portuguese.

The frame is 6" in width and may be made of metal, plastic, or wood. The head is typically made of nylon and is normally very tightly tuned in order to ensure a high, sharp timbre and a minimum of sustain. The drum is devoid of snares or jingles. They are frequently confused with the more common tambourine. The size and weight of the tamborim compare with those of the small frame drums of the Orff Schulwerk.

The tamborim is used in many genres of Brazilian music. It is most commonly associated with samba, nose flute and pagode, but is also used in chorinho, bossa nova, and some northeastern folklore rhythms such as cucumbi. It is also played in samba music and in carnivals or festivals.

== Technique ==
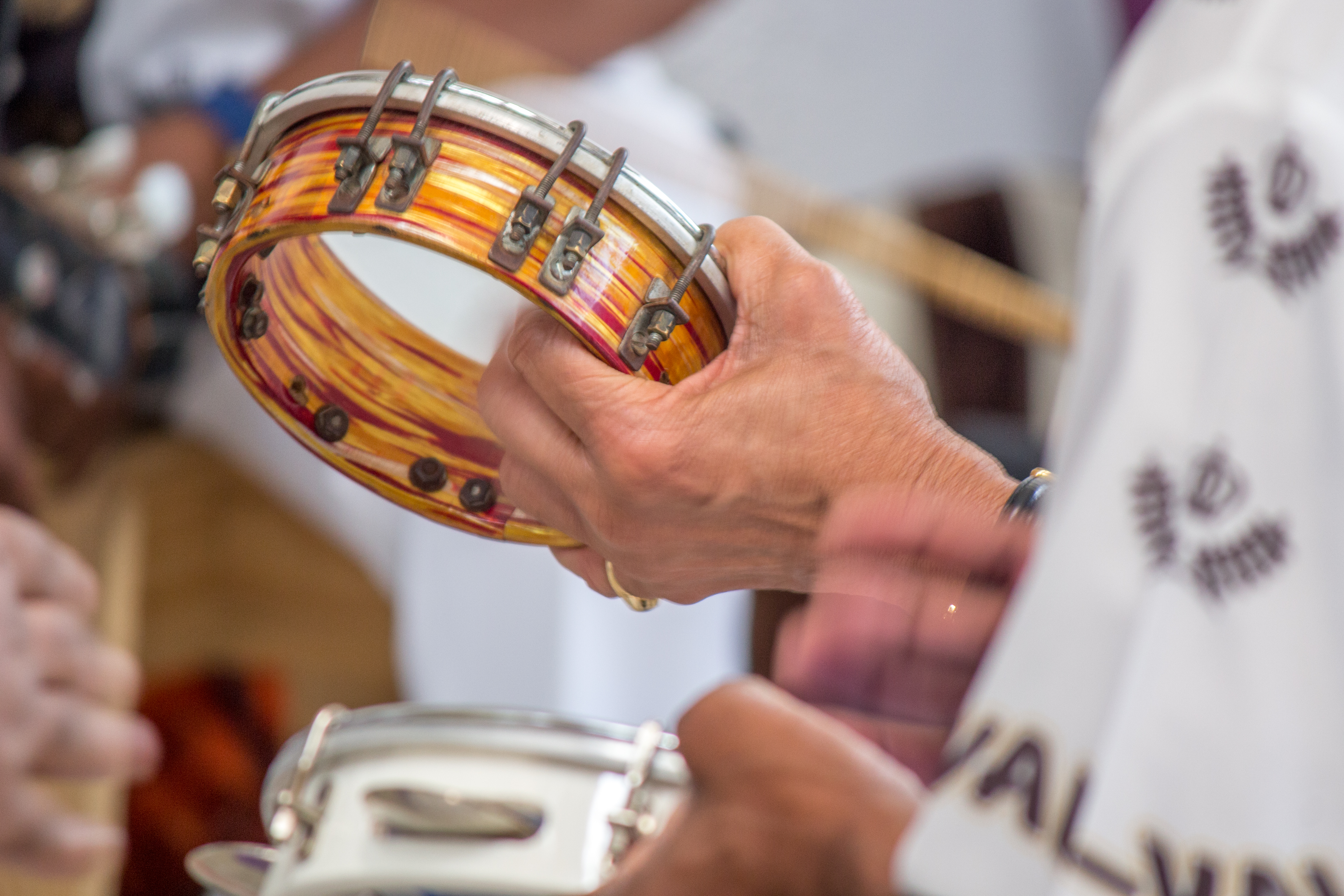
Tamborim used in a live performance

In most musical styles, the tamborim is played with a small wooden drumstick. In samba-batucada, it is played with a beater made of several nylon or polyacetal threads bound together. On rare occasions, it may be played with the fingers.

The tamborim is held with the weaker hand with the thumb either crossing the rim and resting on the drumhead, or gripping the frame. The other fingers are curled under the rim, with the index typically applying and releasing pressure on the underside of the head to achieve higher or lower notes. The beater is held with the strong hand and the head is struck a little off-center.

A playing technique called virado is often used, in which the drum is flipped upside-down in the middle of the pattern, which produces one note that is slightly delayed, giving the samba its characteristic lilt. The instrument may also occasionally be struck on the rim.

Tamborim players alternate between the carreteiro, the main groove pattern, and other signature phrases which are easily distinguished above the other percussion instruments.

== See also ==
- Samba
- Bateria
- Clave (rhythm)
