= Timbau =

Type of drum, typical of Bahia, Brazil

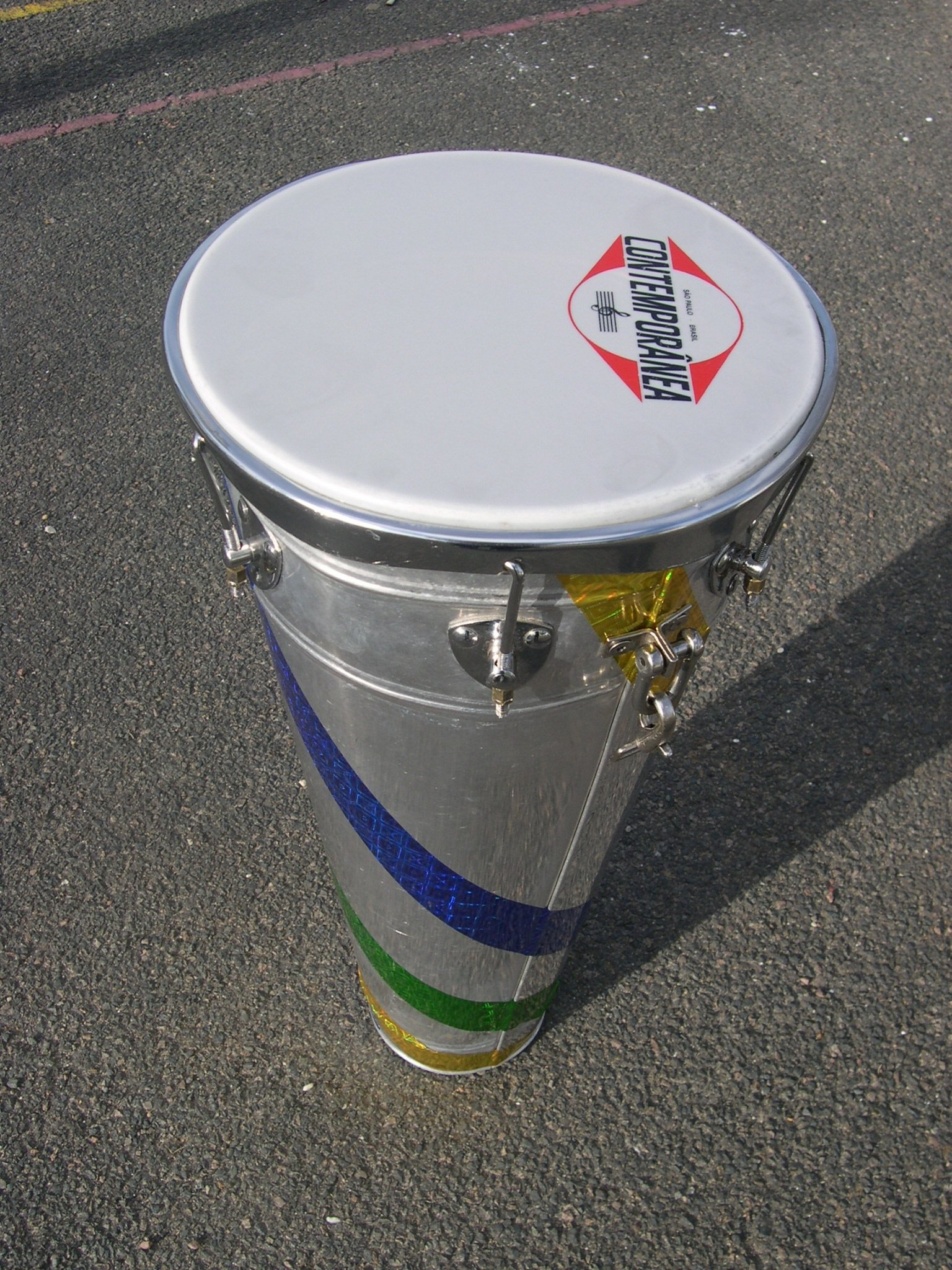
- Brazilian timbal

Percussion instrument
- Other names: Brazilian timbal
- Classification: Membranophone

Related instruments
- Caxambu drum

The timbau or Brazilian timbal is a membranophone instrument derived from the caxambu drum, usually played with both hands. Slightly conical and of varying sizes, it is usually light in weight and made of lacquered wood or metal (usually aluminum) with a tunable nylon head. It is in the shape of an ice cream cone with the top and the point cut off.

The drum is most often found in Bahia, originating in Salvador, Bahia, and is used mainly to play Afro-Brazilian rhythms, such as axé and samba-reggae. It is played in a similar manner to the atabaque, a hand drum of which one version was brought to Brazil in slavery and is used in Candomblé rituals. In the 1980s, a musical/social movement was organized to bring the timbau to popular music.

The timbau is designed to play loud, rapid phrases and solos with powerful slaps. The sound of the timbau varies from a clear, well-defined, high tone to a strong, deep bass. The timbau is available in different lengths; a greater length produces a deeper bass.
