= List of Canada–United States border crossings =

This is a list of border crossings along the Canada–United States border, ordered from west to east (north to south for Alaska crossings). Several crossings are along major highways. Some crossings in remote areas are unstaffed; among those, some require travelers to report to border officials at another location, and some may not have any reporting requirement at all.

On the U.S. side, the Department of State assigns a three-letter Port of Entry code to each crossing. This code is included on the passport entry stamp or parole stamp one receives when crossing into the U.S. One code may correspond to multiple crossings.

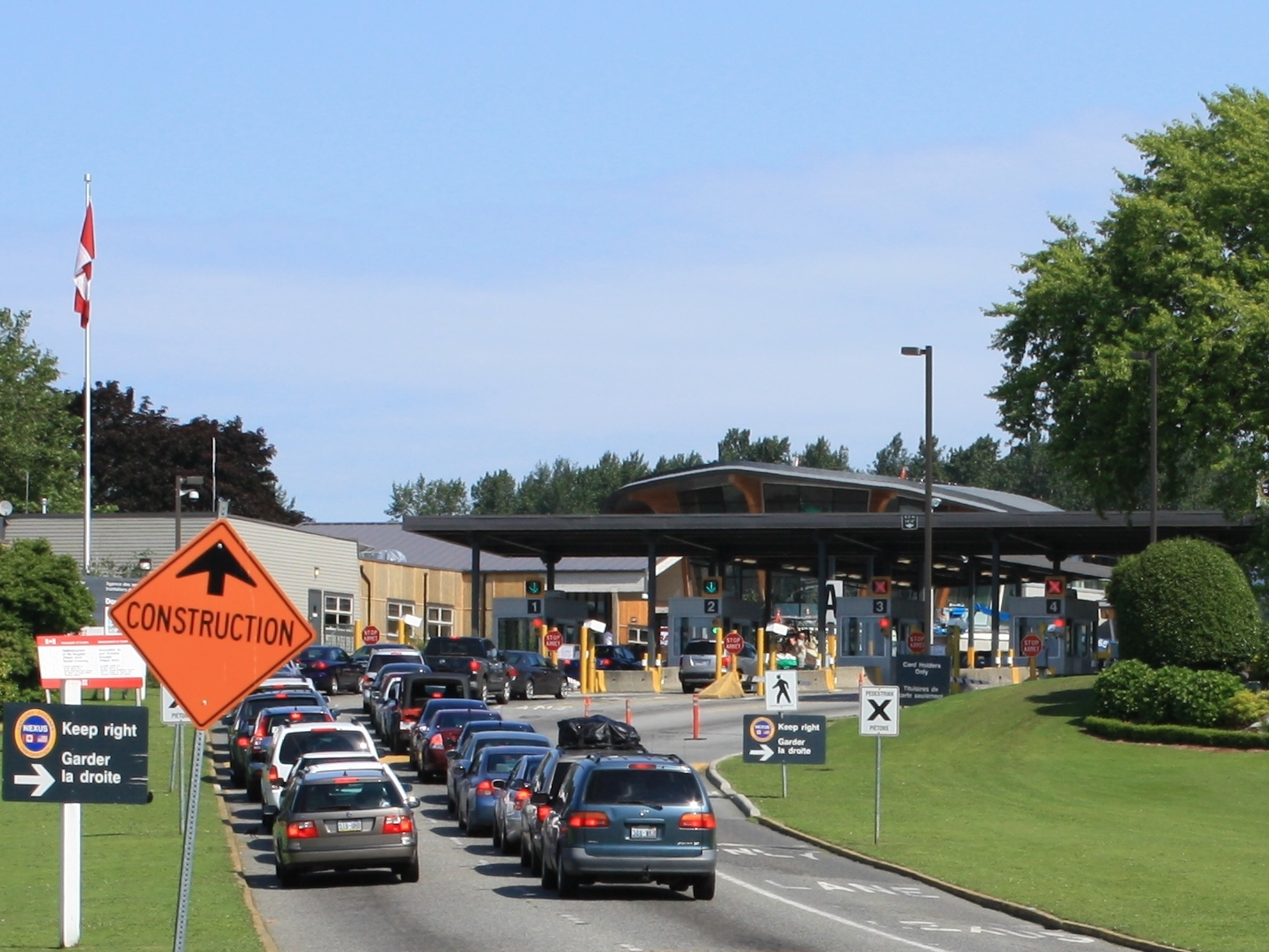
Cars approaching Canada Customs at Douglas, British Columbia, from Blaine, Washington

== Land ports of entry ==
Port of entry hours of service for road crossings, except where noted, are open year-round during the day.

The yellow background indicates a border crossing where travel is permitted in only one direction.

The green background indicates a border crossing that is located at a bridge or a tunnel.

| Port of entry Code | Canada road/highway [community] | U.S. road/highway [community] | Notes | Structure/ notable feature | Coordinates |
Yukon–Alaska
| Poker Creek–Little Gold Creek; PKC | Hwy 9 (Top of the World Highway) | AK-5 (Top of the World Highway) | Canada: Friday before Victoria Day to Sept 15 (9:00–19:00 YT); U.S.: Memorial Day to Labor Day (8:00–18:00 AKT); depending on weather & road conditions. | Northernmost Canada-U.S. border crossing | 64°5′8.02″N 141°0′3.92″W |
| Alcan–Beaver Creek; ALC | Hwy 1 (Alaska Highway) | AK-2 (Alaska Highway) | Year-round (24-hour service). Canada: closed on holidays. | Farthest Canadian inspection station from the actual border (29 km) | 62°36′54.78″N 141°0′4.87″W |
British Columbia–Alaska
| Dalton Cache–Pleasant Camp; DAC | Hwy 3 (Haines Highway) | AK-7 (Haines Highway) | Year-round (8:00–0:00 PT / 7:00–23:00 AKT). | | 59°27′1.67″N 136°21′42.42″W |
| Skagway–Fraser; SKA | Hwy 2 (Klondike Highway) | AK-98 (Klondike Highway) | Canada: north of border; April–Oct (24-hour service) / Nov–Mar (8:00–0:00 PT). U.S.: year-round (24-hour service) | Farthest U.S. inspection station among all U.S. land borders from the actual border (8 mi south). Busiest border crossing of Alaska | 59°37′45.69″N 135°9′50.15″W |
| Hyder–Stewart; HYD | Highway 37A (Glacier Highway) | International Street | Canada: year-round (8:00–0:00 PT / 7:00–23:00 AKT / tele-video reporting after hours.); U.S.: open but unstaffed, roads connect only to Canada | Persons may legally enter the US without reporting to inspection, as there is no U.S. inspection station. (The Hyder station was permanently closed in c. 1970s.) | 55°54′43.28″N 130°1′2.86″W |
British Columbia–Washington
| Point Roberts–Boundary Bay; PTR | 56th Street [Delta] | Tyee Drive | Year-round (24-hour service) | An obelisk marking the westernmost point of the border along the 49th parallel north is found one mile west at Monument Park. | 49°0′7.17″N 123°4′5.66″W |
| Peace Arch (Blaine–Douglas); BLA | Highway 99 (Fraser Delta Thruway) [Surrey] | I-5 | Year-round (24-hour service). No commercial vehicles. | Peace Arch International Park | 49°0′7.45″N 122°45′23.49″W |
| Pacific Highway (Blaine–Surrey); PHY | Highway 15 (Pacific Highway) [Surrey] | SR 543 | Year-round (24-hour service). Commercial vehicles must use this crossing between Surrey and Blaine. | | 49°0′7.74″N 122°44′7.58″W |
| Lynden–Aldergrove; LYN | Highway 13 | SR 539 | Year-round (8:00–0:00 PT). | | 49°0′8.14″N 122°29′6.37″W |
| Sumas–Huntingdon; SUM | Highway 11 (Abbotsford–Mission Highway) | SR 9 | Year-round (24-hour service) | | 49°0′8.65″N 122°15′55.25″W |
| Nighthawk–Chopaka; NIG | Nighthawk Road | Similkameen Road | Year-round (9:00–17:00 PT). | | 49°0′0.76″N 119°40′15.74″W |
| Oroville–Osoyoos; ORO | Highway 97 | US 97 | Year-round (24-hour service) | | 49°0′0.36″N 119°27′45.72″W |
| Ferry–Midway; FER | Dominion Street | Customs Road [Curlew] | Year-round (9:00–17:00 PT). | | 49°0′0.36″N 118°45′39.96″W |
| Danville–Carson; DVL | Highway 41 (Danville Highway) [Grand Forks] | SR 21 | Year-round (8:00–0:00 PT). | | 49°0′0.36″N 118°30′11.85″W |
| Laurier–Cascade; LAU | Highway 395 [Christina Lake] | US 395 | Year-round (8:00–0:00 PT). | | 49°0′0.36″N 118°13′26.12″W |
| Frontier–Paterson; FWA | Highway 22 (Paterson–Trail Highway) [Rossland] | SR 25 [Northport] | Year-round (24-hour service) | | 49°0′1.80″N 117°49′54.12″W |
| Boundary–Waneta; BWA | Highway 22A (Waneta Highway) [Montrose] | Waneta Road [Northport] | Year-round (9:00–17:00 PT). | | 49°0′2.52″N 117°37′30.36″W |
| Metaline Falls–Nelway; MET | Highway 6 (Nelson–Nelway Highway) | SR 31 | Year-round (8:00–18:00 PT). | | 49°0′0.00″N 117°17′58.92″W |
British Columbia–Idaho
| Porthill-Rykerts; PTL | Highway 21 (Creston–Rykerts Highway) [Creston] | SH-1 | Year-round (8:00–0:00 MST / 7:00–23:00 PST, mostly) (7:00–23:00 MST/PST, 2nd Sun, Mar–1st Sat, Nov) | | 48°59′59.64″N 116°29′58.56″W |
| Eastport–Kingsgate; EPI | Highway 95 | US 95 | Year-round (24-hour service) | | 49°0′1.80″N 116°10′53.40″W |
British Columbia–Montana
| Roosville; ROO | Highway 93 [Grasmere] | US 93 [Eureka] | Year-round (24-hour service) | | 48°59′58.56″N 115°3′21.24″W |
Alberta–Montana
| Chief Mountain; CHF | Highway 6 [Waterton Park] | MT 17 | Daytime service, seasonal: 9:00–18:00, May 15–31 and day after Labor Day–Sept 30; 7:00–22:00, June 1–Labor Day; Closed, Oct 1–May 14. | Highest altitude (1,615 m or 5,299 ft) crossing on the US–Canada border; Waterton–Glacier International Peace Park | 48°59′58.92″N 113°39′38.88″W |
| Piegan–Carway; PIE | Highway 2 [Cardston] | US 89 [Babb] | Year-round (8:00–18:00). | | 48°59′53.16″N 113°22′44.40″W |
| Del Bonita; DLB | Highway 62 | S-213 [Cut Bank] | Year-round (8:00–21:00, June 1 – Sept 15; 9:00–18:00, Sept. 16 – May 31) | | 48°59′54.96″N 112°47′17.95″W |
| Sweetgrass–Coutts; SWE | Highway 4 | I-15 | Year-round (24-hour service) | | 48°59′54.24″N 111°57′37.44″W |
| Whitlash–Aden; WHT | Highway 880 | S-409 | Year-round (9:00–17:00). | | 48°59′50.28″N 111°15′31.27″W |
| Wild Horse; HVR | Highway 41 | S-232 [Havre] | Year-round (8:00–21:00, May 15–Sept 30; 8:00–17:00, Oct 1–May 14). | | 48°59′57.48″N 110°12′55.08″W |
Saskatchewan–Montana
| Willow Creek; WCM | Highway 21 [Consul] | S-233 | Year-round; 9:00–17:00 CST/MDT, 2nd Sunday March – 1st Saturday Nov; 10:00–18:00 CST / 9:00–17:00 MST, rest of year | | 49°0′0.00″N 109°43′53.76″W |
| Turner–Climax; TUR | Highway 37 | S-241 | Year-round (8:00–21:00 CST/MDT, June 1 – Sept 15; 9:00–18:00 MT, Sept. 16 – May 31) | | 48°59′58.20″N 108°23′21.12″W |
| Morgan–Monchy; MGM | Highway 4 [Climax] | US 191 [Loring] | Year-round (8:00–21:00 CST/MDT, June 1 – Sept 15; 9:00–18:00 MT, Sept. 16 – May 31) | | 48°59′59.28″N 107°49′54.84″W |
| Opheim–West Poplar River; OPH | Highway 2 [Rockglen] | MT 24 | Year-round (8:00–21:00 CST/MDT, June 1 – Sept 15; 9:00–18:00 MT, Sept. 16 – May 31) | | 48°59′58.2″N 106°22′40.44″W |
| Scobey–Coronach; SCO | Highway 36 | MT 13 | Year-round (8:00–21:00 CST/MDT, June 1 – Sept 15; 9:00–18:00 MT, Sept. 16 – May 31) | Was the world's first fully automated port of entry (est. 1996–1998) | 48°59′58.20″N 105°24′28.08″W |
| Raymond–Regway; RAY | Highway 6 | MT 16 | Year-round (24-hour service) | | 48°59′57.12″N 104°34′28.46″W |
Saskatchewan–North Dakota
| Fortuna–Oungre; FRT | Highway 35 | US 85 | Year-round (8:00–21:00 CST / 9:00 –22:00 CDT, 2nd Sunday March–1st Saturday Nov; 9:00–22:00, rest of year). | | 48°59′58.56″N 103°48′34.18″W |
| Ambrose–Torquay; AMB | Highway 350 | ND 42 | Year-round (8:00–16:00 CST / 9:00–17:00 CDT, 2nd Sunday March–1st Saturday Nov; 9:00–17:00, rest of year). | | 48°59′57.48″N 103°29′12.48″W |
| Noonan–Estevan Highway; NOO | Highway 47 | ND 40 | Year-round (8:00–21:00 CST / 9:00 –22:00 CDT, 2nd Sunday March–1st Saturday Nov; 9:00–22:00, rest of year). | | 48°59′57.48″N 103°0′17.20″W |
| Portal–North Portal; POR | Highway 39 | US 52 | Year-round (24-hour service) | | 48°59′56.04″N 102°33′10.08″W |
| Northgate; NRG | Highway 9 | ND 8 [Flaxton] | Year-round (8:00–21:00 CST / 9:00 –22:00 CDT, 2nd Sunday March–1st Saturday Nov; 9:00–22:00, rest of year). | | 48°59′56.04″N 102°16′30.36″W |
| Sherwood–Carievale; SHR | Highway 8 | ND 28 | Year-round (8:00–21:00 CST / 9:00 –22:00 CDT, 2nd Sunday March–1st Saturday Nov; 9:00–22:00, rest of year). | | 48°59′57.48″N 101°37′40.51″W |
Manitoba–North Dakota
| Antler–Lyleton; ANT | PR 256 [Pierson] | ND 256 | Year-round (9:00–22:00). | | 48°59′58.56″N 101°17′45.96″W |
| Westhope–Coulter; WHO | PTH 83 [Melita] | US 83 | Year-round (8:00–21:00). | | 48°59′58.56″N 101°1′4.80″W |
| Carbury–Goodlands; CRY | PTH 21 [Deloraine] | ND 14 [Souris] | Year-round (9:00–22:00). | | 48°59′57.84″N 100°33′20.11″W |
| International Peace Garden Border Crossing (Dunseith–Boissevain); DNS | PTH 10 | US 281 / ND 3 | Year-round (24-hour service) | International Peace Garden | 48°59′57.48″N 100°3′8.28″W |
| St. John–Lena; SJO | PTH 18 [Killarney] | ND 30 | Year-round (8:00–21:00). | | 48°59′57.84″N 99°39′32.15″W |
| Hansboro–Cartwright; HNS | PTH 5 | ND 4 | Year-round (8:00–21:00). | | 48°59′58.92″N 99°20′48.84″W |
| Sarles–Crystal City; SAR | PTH 34 | ND 20 | Year-round (9:00–22:00). | | 49°0′0″N 98°56′15.79″W |
| Hannah–Snowflake; HNN | PR 242 | CR 13 (91st Ave. NE) | Year-round (9:00–22:00). | | 49°0′0.72″N 98°41′39.48″W |
| Maida–Windygates; MAI | PTH 31 [Darlingford] | ND 1 [Langdon] | Year-round (9:00–22:00). | | 49°0′1.08″N 98°21′53.64″W |
| Walhalla–Winkler; WAL | PTH 32 | ND 32 | Year-round (9:00–22:00). | | 49°0′1.80″N 97°54′30.96″W |
| Neche–Gretna; NEC | PTH 30 | ND 18 | Year-round (9:00–22:00). | | 49°0′1.80″N 97°33′25.20″W |
| Pembina–Emerson; PEM | PTH 75 (Lord Selkirk Highway) | I-29 / US 81 | Year-round (24-hour service) | Formerly known as "West Lynne"; the Canadian side was renamed in 2003 when Emerson East closed. | 49°0′1.80″N 97°14′15.72″W |
Manitoba–Minnesota
| Lancaster–Tolstoi; LAN | PTH 59 | US 59 | Year-round; Victoria Day & Labor Day: 8:00–20:00; Canada: 8:00–22:00; US: 8:00–18:00. | | 49°0′0.72″N 96°48′5.40″W |
| Pinecreek–Piney; PIN | PTH 89 | MN 89 | Year-round; Canada: 9:00–22:00; US: 9:00–17:00. | | 48°59′59.64″N 95°58′41.52″W |
| Roseau–South Junction; ROS | PR 310 | MN 310 | Year-round; Canada: 8:00–22:00; US: 8:00–20:00 | | 48°59′58.56″N 95°45′59.40″W |
| Warroad–Sprague; WAR | PTH 12 | MN 313 | Year-round (24-hour service) | Easternmost crossing along the 49th parallel north | 48°59′56.40″N 95°22′34.32″W |
Ontario–Minnesota
| Baudette–Rainy River; BAU | Highway 11 | MN 72 | Year-round (24-hour service) | | 48°43′8.94″N 94°35′25.25″W |
| International Falls–Fort Frances; INT | Highway 71 | US 53 / US 71 | | | 48°36′26.69″N 93°24′6.42″W |
| Grand Portage–Pigeon River; GPM | Highway 61 [Neebing] | MN 61 | | | 48°0′5.1″N 89°35′6.61″W |
Ontario–Michigan
| Sault Ste. Marie; SSM | Huron Street | I-75 | | | 46°30′30.24″N 84°21′38.58″W |
| Port Huron–Sarnia; PHU | Highway 402 | I-69 / I-94 | | Blue Water Bridge | 42°59′55.3″N 82°25′24.44″W |
| Detroit–Windsor Tunnel; DCT | Goyeau Street | Jefferson Avenue | | | 42°19′25.96″N 83°2′25.04″W |
| Ambassador Bridge (Detroit–Windsor); DCB | Highway 3 [Windsor] | I-75 / I-96 | | Busiest commercial crossing | 42°18′42.47″N 83°4′26.39″W |
| Gordie Howe International Bridge (Detroit–Windsor) | Highway 401 | I-75 | | Southernmost road crossing | 42°17′15″N 83°05′52″W |
Ontario–New York
| Peace Bridge (Buffalo–Fort Erie); BUF | Queen Elizabeth Way | I-190 / Baird Drive | | Busiest passenger vehicle crossing | 42°54′25.06″N 78°54′21.45″W |
| Rainbow Bridge (Niagara Falls–Niagara Falls); RBB | Regional Road 420 (Falls Avenue) | NY 104 / NY 384 | Year-round (24-hour service); No commercial trucks. | | 43°5′24.62″N 79°4′3.69″W |
| Whirlpool Rapids Bridge (Niagara Falls–Niagara Falls); WHR; WRB | River Road | Whirlpool Street | Year-round (7:00–23:00); NEXUS use only. | | 43°6′33.27″N 79°3′30″W |
| Lewiston–Queenston Bridge; LEW | Highway 405 [Niagara-on-the-Lake] | I-190 | Year-round (24-hour service) | | 43°9′10.77″N 79°2′40.12″W |
| Thousand Islands (Alexandria Bay–Lansdowne); AXB | Highway 137 [Hill Island] | I-81 [Wellesley Island] | Year-round (24-hour service) | Thousand Islands Bridge | 44°20′50.18″N 75°59′0.34″W |
| Ogdensburg–Prescott; OGD | Highway 16 [Johnstown] | NY 812 | Year-round (24-hour service) | | 44°43′59.33″N 75°27′27.88″W |
| Three Nations Crossing (Massena–Cornwall); MAS | Akwesasne International Road [Cornwall] | NY 37 [Rooseveltown] | Year-round (24-hour service); Canada: ("interim") at the north end of the new (low) north channel bridge. Travellers from the U.S. to Cornwall Island first cross the island to the Canadian POE. | Seaway International Bridge | 44°59′26.37″N 74°44′22.26″W |
Québec–New York
| Fort Covington–Dundee; FTC | R-132 | Water Street | Year-round (24-hour service) | | 44°59′52.92″N 74°30′27.94″W |
| Trout River (Constable–Elgin); TRO | R-138 [Elgin] | NY 30 [Constable] | Canada: Year-round (6:00-18:00); US: temporarily closed. | Entry into U.S. is temporarily (until 2028) not permitted at this location. | 44°59′31.38″N 74°18′29.43″W |
| Chateaugay–Herdman; CHT | Chemin Herdman [Hinchinbrooke] | CR 52 (River Street) | Year-round (6:00–18:00) | | 44°59′37.13″N 74°5′8.67″W |
| Churubusco–Franklin Centre | R-209 | NY 189 | Canada: closed. US: 8:00–16:00; | Entry into Canada is not permitted at this location. | 44°59′56.41″N 73°56′20.57″W |
| Cannon Corners–Covey Hill; CNC | R-203 [Havelock] | CR 10 [Mooers Forks] | Year-round (8:00–16:00); Canada: 8:00–00:00, May–Oct | | 45°0′11.32″N 73°45′22.90″W |
| Mooers–Hemmingford; MOO | R-219 | CR 34 | Year-round (24-hour service) | | 45°0′16.07″N 73°36′10.88″W |
| Champlain–St. Bernard de Lacolle; CHM | A-15 | I-87 | | | 45°0′31.83″N 73°27′8.26″W |
| Overton Corners–Lacolle; CHM | R-221 | NY 276 [Champlain] | | | 45°0′35.7″N 73°24′0.63″W |
| Rouses Point–Lacolle; ROU | R-223 | US 11 | | | 45°0′37.33″N 73°22′15.21″W |
Québec–Vermont
| Alburgh–Noyan; ABG | R-225 | VT 225 [Alburgh] | | | 45°0′41.69″N 73°17′47.54″W |
| Alburg Springs–Clarenceville; ABS | Chemin Beech Sud | Alburg Springs Road [Alburgh] | Year-round (8:00–00:00). | | 45°0′46.92″N 73°12′44.27″W |
| Highgate Springs–St. Armand/Philipsburg; HIG | R-133 | I-89 | Year-round (24-hour service) | | 45°0′55.55″N 73°5′5.17″W |
| Morses Line–Saint-Armand; MOR | R-235 [St-Armand] | VT 235 | Year-round; Canada: 8:00–16:00, Has Remote Traveller Processing 16:00–8:00, only open to citizens and permanent residents of Canada and the U.S. US: 8:00–00:00 | | 45°0′51.45″N 72°58′42.59″W |
| West Berkshire–Frelighsburg; WBE | R-237 | VT 108 [Berkshire] | Year-round (24-hour service) | | 45°0′58.67″N 72°49′31.13″W |
| Pinnacle Road–East Pinnacle; PIV | Chemin de Richford | Pinnacle Road [Richford] | Year-round (8:00–00:00). | | 45°0′56.03″N 72°42′00.15″W |
| Richford–Abercorn; RIF | R-139 | VT 139 | Year-round (24-hour service) | | 45°0′54.00″N 72°39′45.51″W |
| East Richford–Glen Sutton; ERC | Chemin de la Vallée-Missisquoi | VT 105A | Year-round (8:00–16:00) | Missisquoi River Bridge | 45°0′42.79″N 72°35′19.13″W |
| North Troy–Highwater; NRT | R-243 | VT 243 | Year-round (24-hour service) | | 45°0′26.12″N 72°24′57.25″W |
| Beebe Plain–Beebe Border; BEB | R-247 [Stanstead] | Beebe Road [Derby] | Year-round (24-hour service) | Canada: formerly named Beebe. | 45°0′20.93″N 72°08′31.16″W |
| Derby Line–Stanstead; NPV | R-143 [Stanstead] | US 5 | Year-round (6:00–20:00) | | 45°0′20.64″N 72°05′57.56″W |
| Derby Line–Rock Island; NPV | A-55 [Stanstead] | I-91 | Year-round (24-hour service) | Canada: formerly named Rock Island. | 45°0′21.11″N 72°05′17.46″W |
| Norton–Stanhope; NRN | R-147 | VT 147 | Year-round (24-hour service) | | 45°0′38.46″N 71°47′35.88″W |
| Canaan–Hereford Road; CNA | R-141 | VT 141 | Year-round (24-hour service) | | 45°0′45.47″N 71°33′36.80″W |
| Beecher Falls–East Hereford; BEE | R-253 | VT 253 | Year-round (24-hour service) | | 45°0′48.21″N 71°30′19.11″W |
Québec–New Hampshire
| Pittsburg–Chartierville; PNH | R-257 | US 3 | Year-round (8:00–00:00) | | 45°15′09.9″N 71°12′17.7″W |
Québec–Maine
| Coburn Gore–Woburn; COB | R-161 | SR 27 | Year-round (24-hour service) | | 45°22′43.01″N 70°48′28.96″W |
| Armstrong–Jackman; JKM | R-173 | US 201 / SR 6 | Year-round (24-hour service) | | 45°48′20.26″N 70°23′48.24″W |
| St. Zacharie; STZ | Route de la Frontière | Golden Road (private-North Maine Woods) | Canada: open only for Pilot Project for Travellers in Remote Areas-Quebec (PPTRA-Q) permit holders, during U.S. hours. US: Year-round (6:00–20:00, Mon–Thurs / 6:00–16:00 Fri). | | 46°05′34.29″N 70°17′25.68″W |
| St. Aurelie; SRL | R-277 | St. Aurelie Road (private–North Maine Woods) | Year-round; Canada: 9:00–17:00 Mon–Fri, with additional hours for PPTRA-Q permits; US: 6:00–21:00, Mon–Thurs / 6:00–16:00 Fri | | 46°12′27.02″N 70°16′34.31″W |
| Saint-Just de Bretenières–St. Juste | Rue des Moulins [Saint-Just-de-Bretenières] | St. Juste Road / Stetson Road (private–North Maine Woods) | Year-round; Canada: 9:00–17:00 Mon–Fri, with additional hours for PPTRA-Q permits; US: 6:00–21:00, Mon–Thurs / 6:00–16:00 Fri | | 46°32′44.60″N 70°01′44.66″W |
| Saint Pamphile; SPA | Route Elgin Sud | Blanchette / Maibec Road (private–North Maine Woods) | Year-round; Canada: 9:00–17:00 Mon–Fri, with additional hours for PPTRA-Q permits; US: 6:00–21:00, Mon & Thurs / 6:00–16:00 Tues, Wed & Fri / 8:00–16:00 Sat | | 46°56′33.06″N 69°45′01.39″W |
| Estcourt Station–Pohénégamook | Rue de la Frontière | Frontier Road (public) / Estcourt Road (private-North Maine Woods) | Year Round; Canada: 9:00–17:00 Mon–Fri, with additional hours for PPTRA-Q permits; US: 9:00–17:00 Mon-Fri. | US: at road to Maine interior, 0.83 km or 0.52 mi southwest of Canadian POE | 47°27′22.46″N 69°13′41.38″W 47°26′59.31″N 69°14′5.20″W |
New Brunswick–Maine
| Fort Kent–Clair; FTK | Route 161 / Route 205 | US 1 | Year-round (24-hour service) | | 47°14′57.3″N 68°36′13.6″W |
| Madawaska–Edmundston; MAD | Route 120 | Bridge Street | Year-round (24-hour service) | | 47°21′36.5″N 68°19′43.3″W |
| Van Buren–St. Leonard; VNB | Route 17 / Bridge Street/Rue du Pont | Bridge Street | Year-round (24-hour service) | | 47°09′34.92″N 67°55′51.24″W |
| Hamlin–Grand Falls; HML | Route 218 | Boundaryline Road | 7:00–23:00 ET / 8:00–00:00 AT | | 47°03′37.95″N 67°47′24.57″W |
| Limestone–Gillespie Portage; LIM | Route 375 | SR 229 | 6:00–22:00 ET / 7:00– 23:00 AT | | 46°55′28.45″N 67°47′24.57″W |
| Fort Fairfield–Andover; FTF | Route 190 [Perth-Andover] | SR 161 | Year-round (24-hour service) | | 46°45′55.18″N 67°47′21.84″W |
| Easton–River de Chute | Smugglers Road | Ladner Road | 8:00–16:00 ET / 9:00–17:00 AT | | 46°36′01.14″N 67°47′17.79″W |
| Bridgewater–Centreville; BWM | Route 110 | Boundary Line Road | 5:00–21:00 ET / 6:00–22:00 AT | | 46°27′01.28″N 67°47′05.18″W |
| Monticello–Bloomfield | Line Road | Fletcher Road | Monday–Saturday (8:00–16:00 ET / 9:00–17:00 AT) | | 46°19′03.33″N 67°46′58.14″W |
| Houlton–Woodstock; HTM | Route 95 | I-95 | Year-round (24-hour service) | | 46°08′06.74″N 67°46′52.76″W |
| Orient–Fosterville | Route 122 | Boundary Road | 7:00–23:00 ET / 8:00–00:00 AT, June–Sept; 7:00–17:00 ET / 8:00–18:00 AT, Oct–May | Boundary Bridge | 45°49′00.30″N 67°46′51.21″W |
| Forest City | Forest City Road | Forest City Road | 8:00–16:00 ET / 9:00–17:00 AT; US (winter): closed on Sundays | Forest City Bridge | 45°39′46.87″N 67°43′42.01″W |
| Vanceboro–St. Croix; VCB | Route 4 | SR 6 | Year-round (24-hour service) | | 45°34′07.58″N 67°25′42.86″W |
| International Avenue; CLS | Route 1 / St. Stephen Drive | International Avenue | Year-round (24-hour service); Commercial vehicles must use this crossing between St. Stephen & Calais. | | 45°09′39.76″N 67°18′09.79″W |
| Calais–Milltown; CLS | Milltown Blvd / Route 170 [St. Stephen] | North Street Extension | 6:00–22:00 ET / 7:00–23:00 AT | | 45°10′11.88″N 67°17′48.39″W |
| St. Stephen (Ferry Point Bridge); CLS | Milltown Blvd / Route 170 | Main Street / SR 9 | Year-round (24-hour service); No commercial vehicles. | | 45°11′30.0″N 67°17′0.2″W |
| Lubec–Campobello; LUB | Route 774 | SR 189 | Year-round (24-hour service) | | 44°51′33.8″N 66°58′48.8″W |

== Unstaffed road crossings ==
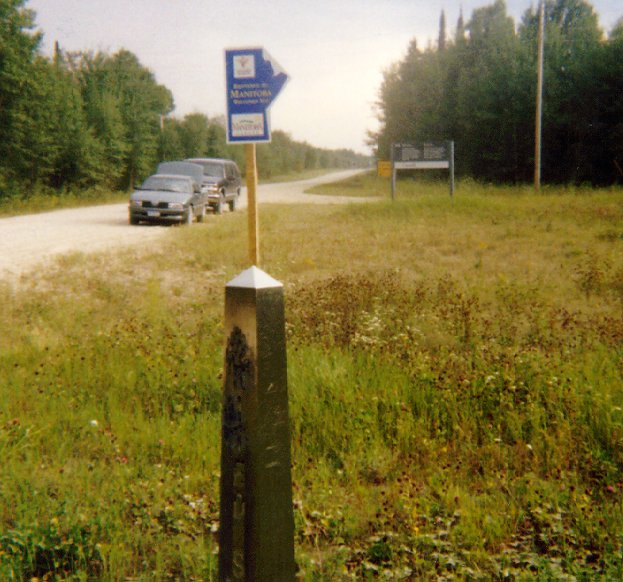
Unstaffed road crossing at Angle Inlet, Minnesota

This is a list of roads that cross the U.S.–Canada border that do not have border inspection services, but where travelers are legally allowed to cross the border in one or both directions.

In prior years, there were dozens of such roads where one could legally cross the border and then proceed to an open Customs office to report for inspection, but most have since been barricaded. Current requirements for reporting to CBSA or CBP for inspection are noted.

Many former uncontrolled roads that served as points of entry along the U.S. Customs and Border Protection Swanton Sector were barricaded/closed in the mid-1970s in securing the 1976 Montreal Summer Olympics. These included Clinton, Franklin and St. Lawrence counties in upstate New York, and in Franklin, Orleans and Essex counties in Vermont.

| Canada City/Town | Canada Road Name | Province/ Territory | United States City/Town | United States Road Name | State | Notes | Coordinates |
|---|---|---|---|---|---|---|---|
| Stewart | Road to Salmon Glacier [Premier] | British Columbia | Hyder | NF-88, Tongass National Forest | Alaska | Unstaffed and open. The Canadian road ends at the former Granduc Mine; the U.S. road connects only to Canada. | 56°2′46.32″N 130°2′12.48″W |
| Skagit Valley Provincial Park | Silver Skagit Road | British Columbia | North Cascades National Park | Silver Skagit Road | Washington | Unstaffed and open. The Canadian road with access to Hozomeen Campground on Ross Lake ends about 2 miles (3.2 km) inside the US. Persons found on the American side by the U.S. Border Patrol should be prepared to provide passport identification. | 49°0′0.72″N 121°3′46.80″W |
| Warner County | Range Road 153B, Range Road 152, Range Road 150, Range Road 144, Range Road 142, Township Road 10A | Alberta | Toole County | Border Road | Montana | Series of minor unpaved roads that cross the border with unstaffed crossings. All persons crossing must report to customs at Sweetgrass/Coutts. | 48.99838°N 111.95761°W and nearby |
| Northwest Angle Provincial Forest | PR 525 | Manitoba | Angle Inlet | CSAH 49 | Minnesota | The only east–west crossing between Western Canada and the contiguous US, the border crossing is staffed remotely by both countries. Travelers are directed to video telephones 12.5 km (7.8 mi) from the border in Angle Inlet, Minnesota, to contact the Canadian or U.S. border agencies to make their declarations. | 49°17′17.59″N 95°9′12.21″W |
| Kanatakon (St. Regis), Akwesasne 15 Réserve | Andrew Johnson Rd & Saint Regis St | Quebec | Akwesasne, St. Regis Mohawk Reservation | Johnson & St. Regis Roads | New York | Unstaffed crossings to/from Québec are accessible by road only through New York. No requirement to report. | 44°59′58.02″N 74°39′0.14″W |
| Tsi Snaihne (Snye), Akwesasne 15 Réserve | River, Phillips, Snye, McDonald & Chapman Roads | Quebec | Akwesasne, St. Regis Mohawk Reservation | River, Phillips, Snye, McDonald & Chapman Roads | New York | Unstaffed crossings to/from Québec are accessible by road only through New York. No requirement to report. | 44°59′57.70″N 74°36′51.30″W |
| Dundee | Chemin de la Pointe Hopkins | Quebec | Fort Covington | Hopkins Point Road | New York | Unstaffed crossing to/from Québec accessible by road only through New York. Signs direct travelers to report to the nearby staffed border post. | 44°59′53.16″N 74°30′32.94″W |
| Sutton | East Richford Slide Road | Quebec | Richford | East Richford Slide Road | Vermont | Unstaffed and open. Road in East Richford, Vermont, briefly crosses the border into Canada for approximately 1/3 mile (0.54 km) before crossing back to the US. The area is remote and has no connection to the rest of Canada. No requirement to report. | 45°00′41.1″N 72°34′53.7″W |
| Gilbert Road | Route de Bellechasse | Quebec | Seboomook Lake, Maine | Gilbert Road | Maine | International bridge built by a logging company to access its private property in Maine and is gated. No border inspection services have ever existed at this location. It appears this bridge was removed in 2014. | 46°21′29.4″N 70°10′30.8″W |

== Rail crossings ==
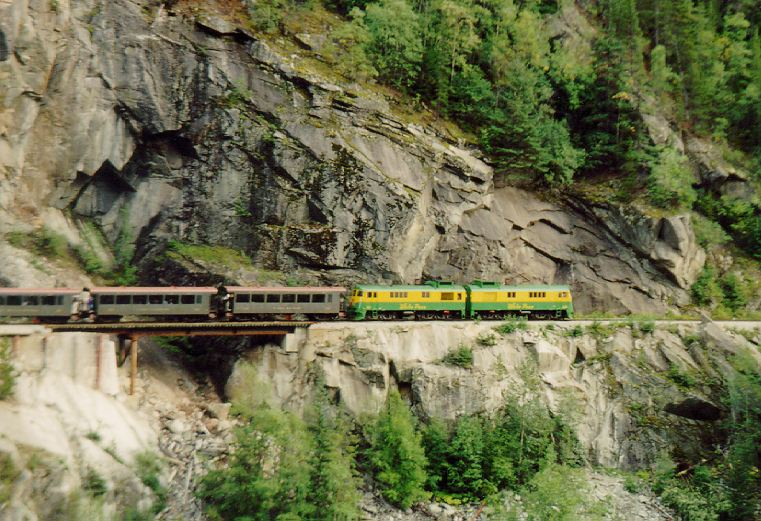
Train returning to Skagway, Alaska, from Whitehorse, Yukon, along the White Pass and Yukon Route

The green background indicates a crossing that is located at a bridge or a tunnel.

The blue background indicates a crossing where passenger rail service is available.

The red background indicates a closed railroad crossing.

| Canada Nearest Community | Canada Rail | U.S. Nearest Community | U.S. Rail | Notes | Structure or Notable Feature | Coordinates |
British Columbia–Alaska
| Fraser | WPY | Skagway | WPY | 3 ft (914 mm) narrow gauge route, isolated line not connected to any others in North America. Former northern terminus Whitehorse, now ends at Carcross. | | 59°37′27.99″N 135°8′20.58″W |
British Columbia–Washington
| White Rock | BNSF | Blaine | BNSF | Used by Amtrak Cascades passenger trains. Border inspection services are provided at Pacific Central Station in Vancouver, British Columbia. | | 49°0′7.56″N 122°45′27.00″W |
| Huntingdon | CP, SRY | Sumas | BNSF | | | 49°0′8.64″N 122°16′0.84″W |
| Grand Forks | KFR | Danville | KFR | Abandoned by the KFR south of the border. | | 49°0′0.36″N 118°29′33.36″W |
| Billings | KFR | Laurier | KFR | Canada section is isolated from the Canadian rail network following CP's 1991 abandonment of their Boundary Sub, accessible only through the U.S. | | 49°0′0.36″N 118°13′28.56″W |
| Waneta | KFR | Northport | KFR | Canada section is isolated from the Canadian rail network following the abandonment of Burlington Northern's Nelson Sub in 1989, only accessible through the U.S. | | 49°0′2.52″N 117°37′36.84″W |
British Columbia–Idaho
| Kingsgate | CP | Eastport | UP | | | 49°0′1.80″N 116°10′55.92″W |
Alberta–Montana
| Coutts | | Sweetgrass | BNSF | | | 48°59′54.24″N 111°57′32.40″W |
Saskatchewan–North Dakota
| North Portal | | Portal | CP (SOO) | | | 48°59′56.04″N 102°32′56.40″W |
| Northgate | CN | Northgate | BNSF | CN abandoned north of the border in 2001. Since 2016, approximately one mile of track has been active in Canada to serve a multimodal export terminal operated by Ceres Global Ag. | | 48°59′55.68″N 102°15′51.48″W |
Manitoba–North Dakota
| Gretna | CP | Neche | BN | The line was abandoned by both railways during the early 1990s. The tracks have been removed on both sides. | | 49°0′1.80″N 97°33′38.16″W |
| West Lynne (Emerson) | CN | Pembina | BN | The tracks were removed after BN abandoned their line from Joliette to the border in 1980; CN and BN successor BNSF still interchange at the nearby Emerson-Noyes crossing. | | 49°0′1.44″N 97°14′6.36″W |
Manitoba–Minnesota
| Emerson | CN (west) / CP (east) | Noyes | BNSF (west) / CP (east) | Since the closure of the adjacent road border crossing, this major rail crossing has been managed by the nearby Emerson (Canada) and Pembina (U.S.) ports of entry. | | 49°0′1.44″N 97°12′13.32″W |
| Sprague | CN | Warroad | CN | The U.S. stretch between Warroad & Baudette connects only through Canada. It was isolated from the U.S. rail network when Minnesota Northern Railroad abandoned the Warroad subdivision in 2009. | | 48°59′56.40″N 95°22′32.16″W |
Ontario–Minnesota
| Rainy River | CN | Baudette | CN | The U.S. stretch between Warroad & Baudette connects only through Canada. | | 48°43′10.56″N 94°35′29.04″W |
| Fort Frances | MDW | International Falls | MDW | Once connecting to CN's nearby mainline, the Fort Frances stretch is now isolated from the Canadian rail network. Trains must cross this bridge to the U.S. to get back into Canada. | Fort Frances – International Falls International Bridge | 48°36′26.69″N 93°24′6.42″W |
| Fort Frances | CN | Ranier | CN | | Ranier International Rail Bridge | 48°36′53.64″N 93°24′6.42″W |
Ontario–Michigan
| Sault Ste. Marie | CN (ACR) | Sault Ste. Marie | CN (WC) | | Sault Ste. Marie International Railroad Bridge | 46°30′30.60″N 84°21′41.76″W |
| Sarnia | CN | Port Huron | CN | | Paul M. Tellier Tunnel | 42°57′34.20″N 82°25′21.36″W |
| Windsor | CP | Detroit | CP | | Michigan Central Railway Tunnel | 42°19′9.12″N 83°3′30.24″W |
Ontario–New York
| Fort Erie | CN | Buffalo | CN | | International Railway Bridge | 42°55′46.20″N 78°54′28.80″W |
| Niagara Falls | CP | Niagara Falls | CP | Closed to rail traffic in 2000. Presently mothballed. | Michigan Central Railway Bridge | 43°6′30.60″N 79°3′29.52″W |
| Niagara Falls | CN | Niagara Falls | CSX | Used by Amtrak/Via Maple Leaf passenger trains. Cars may use the bridge if all passengers have a Nexus Card. | Whirlpool Rapids Bridge | 43°6′33.27″N 79°3′30.00″W |
Québec–New York
| Sainte-Agnès-de-Dundee | CSX | Fort Covington | CSX | | | 44°59′51.36″N 74°29′8.88″W |
| Elgin | NYC | Trout River | NYC | Abandoned, but ROW intact. | | 44°59′31.92″N 74°14′32.28″W |
| Cantic | CP (west track) & CN (east track) | Rouses Point | CP (DH) | Used by Amtrak Adirondack passenger trains, using CN track in Canada. Cantic port of entry next to Lacolle 223. | | 45°0′36.72″N 73°22′18.12″W |
Québec–Vermont
| Clarenceville | CN | Alburg Springs | CN | | | 45°0′45.00″N 73°14′28.32″W |
| Abercorn | CMQ | Richford | CMQ | U.S. section isolated from the U.S. rail network following 1990 abandonment of Central Vermont Railway's Richford Branch. Trains in the U.S. must pass through Canada. Part of the Farnham-Richford-North Troy line. | | 45°0′54.36″N 72°39′49.32″W |
| Glen Sutton | CMQ | East Richford | CMQ | Canadian section has always been isolated from the Canadian rail network. Trains must pass through the U.S. to connect with the rest of Canada. Part of the Farnham-Richford-North Troy line. | | 45°0′41.76″N 72°35′9.24″W |
| Highwater | CMQ | North Troy | CMQ | Trains in Canada must pass back through the U.S. from this isolated section. Part of the Farnham-Richford-North Troy line. | | 45°0′25.56″N 72°24′43.92″W |
| Lineboro | QCR | North Derby | QCR | Tracks were removed in the 1990s. Now Piste cyclable de Stanstead (Canada) and Newport Bikepath (U.S.). Signs urge cyclists not to cross here. | | 45°0′20.88″N 72°10′17.40″W |
| Stanhope | SLR | Norton | SLQ | | | 45°0′38.16″N 71°47′42.36″W |
Québec–Maine
| Trudel (Lac-Mégantic) | CMQ | Beattie (Jackman) | CMQ | | | 45°32′48.12″N 70°41′21.48″W |
New Brunswick–Maine
| St. Leonard | MNRY | Van Buren | MNRY | | Unnamed rail bridge | 47°10′29.64″N 67°56′32.28″W |
| Tinker | CP | Fort Fairfield | CP | Tracks removed. | | 46°47′36.60″N 67°47′22.56″W |
| Green Road | CAR | Houlton | CAR | Abandoned June 1989. | | 46°5′42.72″N 67°46′52.32″W |
| St. Croix | NBSR | Vanceboro | EMRY | Only Canada-U.S. border crossing to be attacked by a foreign force. See Vanceboro international bridge bombing. | Saint Croix–Vanceboro Railway Bridge | 45°33′50.40″N 67°25′39.00″W |
| Mohannes | NBSR | Woodland | NBSR | The American stretch is isolated from the rest of the U.S. rail network, and trains must cross this bridge to a small portion through Canada to the U.S. at Baring. Part of NBSR's St. Stephen-Calais-Woodland branch; leased from Woodland Rail. | Sprague Falls Railroad Bridge | 45°10′0.84″N 67°24′15.48″W |
| Upper Mills | NBSR | Baring Plantation | NBSR | The Canadian stretch between Mohannes and Upper Mills is isolated from the Canadian rail network, and trains must cross this bridge into the U.S. to connect to the rest of Canada. Sold to Woodland Rail by Pan-Am Railways after a short period out of service. Part of the St. Stephen-Calais-Woodland branch; leased from Woodland Rail. | Baring Railroad Bridge | 45°8′3.84″N 67°24′15.48″W |
| St. Stephen (Milltown) | NBSR | Calais | NBSR | The American stretch between Baring and Calais is isolated from the U.S. rail network, and trains in the U.S. must switch direction and cross this bridge into Canada to connect with the rest of the U.S. rail network. The line was disconnected from the U.S. network when Guilford Rail (Pan-Am Railways) abandoned the connecting line to Bangor in 1989; those rails were intact until torn up in the late 2000s. Part of the St. Stephen-Calais-Woodland branch; leased from Woodland Rail on the U.S. side. | Salmon Falls Railroad Bridge | 45°10′29.28″N 67°17′29.40″W |

== Ferry crossings ==
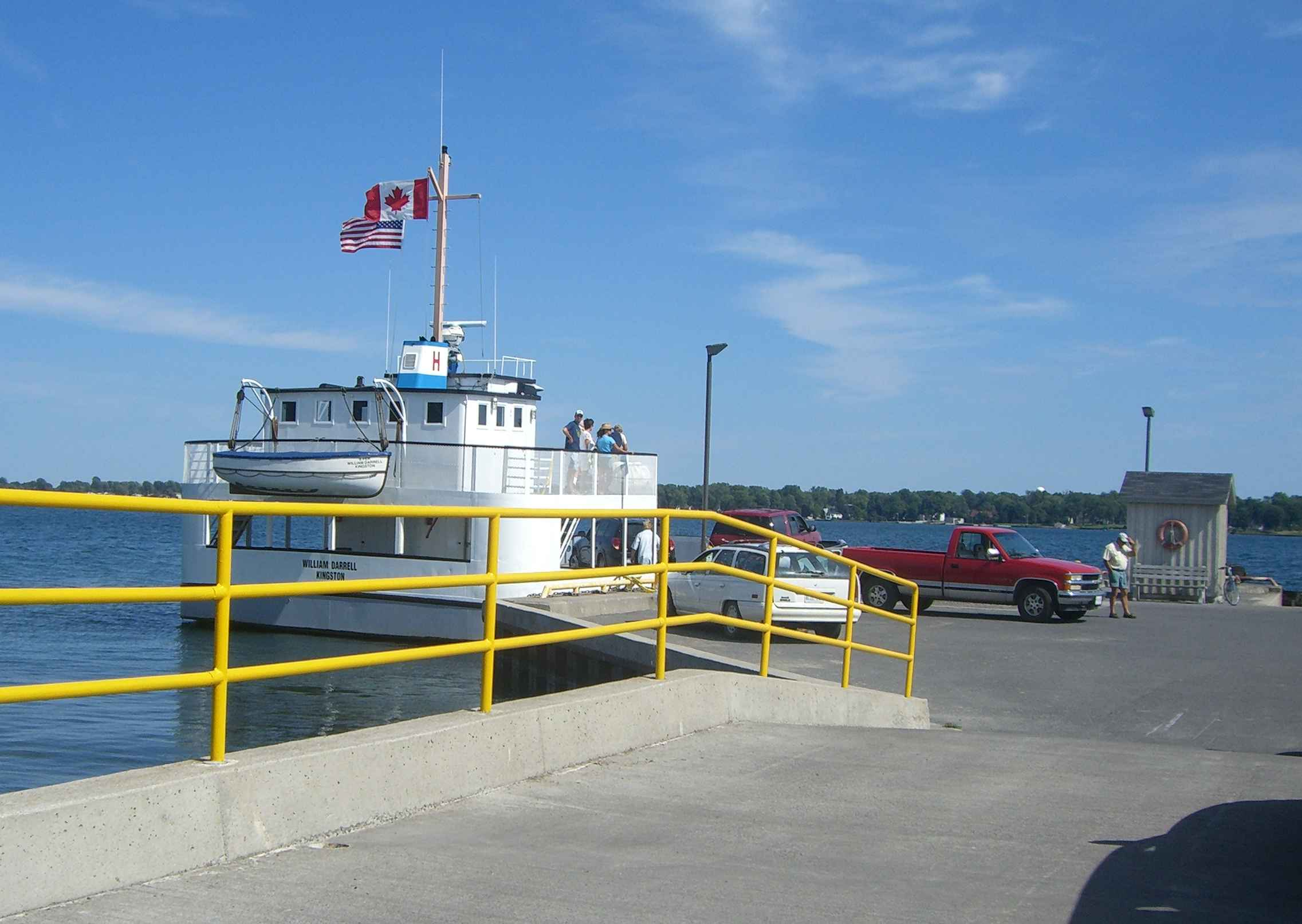
Ferry departing Wolfe Island, ON for Cape Vincent, NY

This list is of point-to-point international ferry services, including those for road vehicles, passengers, and rail. Other marine ports of entry are not included.

| Canada Ferry Terminal | Province/ Territory | Waterway | U.S. Ferry Terminal | Code | State | Ferry Company / Vessel | Notes |
|---|---|---|---|---|---|---|---|
| Prince Rupert | British Columbia | Inside Passage / Dixon Entrance | Ketchikan / Juneau | KET; JUN | Alaska | Alaska Marine Highway | Alaska Marine Highway also operates vehicle ferries between Ketchikan, Alaska and Bellingham, Washington, and Alaska Rail Marine operates train ferries between Whittier, Alaska and Seattle, Washington through the Inside Passage of British Columbia without docking at Canadian ports. For the 2024 season, Alaska Marine Highway is not servicing Prince Rupert. |
| Victoria | British Columbia | Strait of Juan de Fuca | Port Angeles | PNG | Washington | Blackball Transport [MV Coho] | |
| Victoria | British Columbia | Strait of Juan de Fuca | Seattle | SEA | Washington | Clipper Navigation | Passengers only. |
| Sidney | British Columbia | San Juan Islands | Anacortes | ANA | Washington | Washington State Ferries | The Sidney to Anacortes ferry was suspended in 2020 due to COVID-19 concerns, and is not expected to resume until 2030 due to ship and crew shortages. |
| Waterton Park | Alberta | Waterton Lake | Goat Haunt Ranger Station | | Montana | Waterton Shoreline Cruise | Scheduled passenger trips originating in Canada from the end of May to mid-September stop at the U.S. station, which is accessed in Glacier National Park only by hiking trails. |
| Walpole Island | Ontario | St. Clair River | Algonac | AGN | Michigan | Walpole–Algonac Ferry | |
| Pelee | Ontario | Lake Erie | Sandusky | SDY | Ohio | Ontario Ferries | Seasonal: April to mid-September. |
| Wolfe Island | Ontario | St. Lawrence River | Cape Vincent | CAP | New York | Cape Vincent-Wolfe Island Ferry | Seasonal: May 1 to October 15. |
| Deer Island | New Brunswick | Passamaquoddy Bay (Head Harbour Passage) | Eastport | EPM | Maine | Cummings Cove to Eastport Ferry | Seasonal: mid-June to mid-September. This ferry is permanently out of service. |
| Yarmouth | Nova Scotia | Gulf of Maine | Bar Harbor | BHM | Maine | Bay Ferries | Seasonal: late-May to mid-October. |

== Closed land ports of entry ==
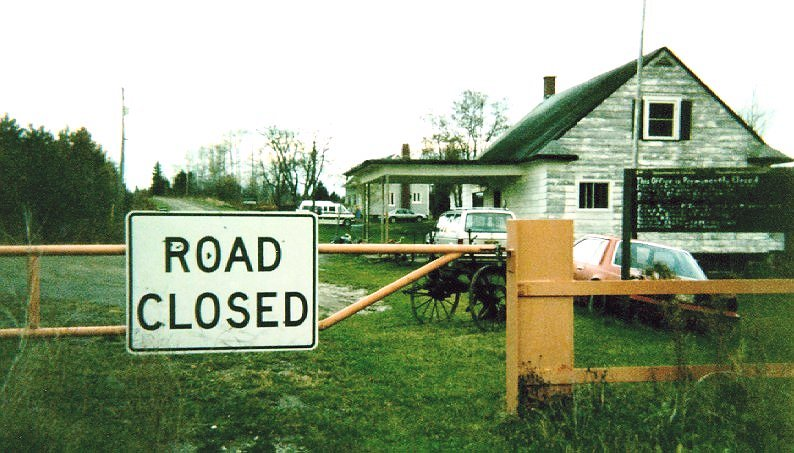
Closed border station in Listerville, New Brunswick

This list includes only those crossings known to have had customs or immigration services at the border, but are now inactive. They are listed in order from west to east. Roads that are unattended, but otherwise still functioning, are listed in the Unstaffed road crossings section.

| Canada Port of Entry | Canada Road/ Highway | Province/ Territory | United States Port of Entry | United States Road/ Highway | State | Notes | Photo | Coordinates |
|---|---|---|---|---|---|---|---|---|
| Boundary Bay | 67 Street | British Columbia | Point Roberts | Meadow Lane | Washington | A former border crossing (sometimes called "Beach Road") permanently closed in 1975 when the Tyee Road border crossing was expanded. The former Canada border station remains and has been refurbished, located on the eastern side of the peninsula. | | 49°0′7.20″N 123°4′14.0″W |
| | Maple Falls Road | British Columbia | | South Pass Road | Washington | A former border crossing between Columbia Valley and Silver Lake. Access to the Canadian side was formerly only possible through Washington State. | | 49°0′7.20″N 122°2′16.80″W |
| | Pacific Crest Trail | British Columbia | | Pacific Crest Trail | Washington | Travel was formerly permitted into Canada only for trail hikers who had obtained a Pacific Crest Trail Entry Permit in advance. The CBSA discontinued this program as of January 31, 2025. | | 49°0′0″N 120°47′59.42″W |
| Chopaka West | Chopaka Road | British Columbia | Nighthawk West | Chopaka Road | Washington | Canada periodically provided border services at this crossing on Chopaka Road on the foothills west of the Similkameen River until the US barricaded the road in 1964. The Government of Canada still owns the property at the border. A branch of the Great Northern Railway once crossed the border at this location, but was abandoned in the late 1930s, around the time when the US stopped providing border inspections at the location. | | 49°0′0″N 119°43′33.4″W |
| Sidley | County Route 4777 | British Columbia | | | Washington | Richard G. Sidley was the Territorial Police and Customs Collector, 1889–1907. Office replaced by Bridesville. | | 48°59′59″N 119°15′28″W |
| Bridesville | Old Molson Road | British Columbia | Molson | Old Railroad Road | Washington | Both were stations on the VV&E, a Great Northern Railway subsidiary. The rail track between Molson and Midway was lifted in 1936. The Bridesville customs office was established in 1907 and closed in 1939. Molson ceased as a port of entry in 1941. The former Customs and Immigration building is included in a museum display at Molson. | | 49°0′0.72″N 119°10′45.84″W |
| Myncaster | Myncaster Road | British Columbia | Chesaw | Bolster Road | Washington | The Myncaster customs office, which handled both road and rail traffic, existed from 1907 to 1937. Myncaster was a station on the VV&E, a Great Northern Railway subsidiary. The rail track, which did not cross the border at this location, was lifted between Molson and Midway in 1936. The US ended customs services around 1955. In 1990, the crossing temporarily re-opened to permit the passage of draft horses for competitions in the area, with crossing into Canada permitted on May 14 and crossing into the US permitted on June 9. | | 49°0′0.00″N 119°1′18.12″W |
| Newgate | Dorr Road | British Columbia | Gateway | | Montana | This crossing was on the eastern bank of the Kootenay River at the boundary. Customs operations, which began in 1902, inspected both traffic on the river and the adjacent Great Northern Railway branch. The US closed its Customs office when rail service ended in 1935, with officers relocating to the busier Roosville crossing about 5.4 miles (8.7 km) eastward. The railroad tracks were removed in 1938, and Canada closed its customs office in 1939. The U.S. Post Office closed in 1950 and, what was left of the town was inundated by water in 1975 with the completion of the Libby Dam, which created Lake Koocanusa. | | 49°0′3.96″N 114°28′42.24″W |
| Flathead | Flathead Rd | British Columbia | Trailcreek | North Fork Rd | Montana | This crossing was adjacent to the Flathead River. Canada operated a station about a mile north of the border from 1904–1905 and closer to the border from 1914 to 1923, 1926, 1931 to 1941, and from the mid-1940s. In the 1970s, both the US and Canada constructed new border facilities to better accommodate regular recreational traffic. The crossing closed in 1996 due to flooding of the road just north of the border, and the road is now gated. Both the US and Canada station buildings remain. | | 49°0′3.96″N 114°28′42.24″W |
| Whiskey Gap | Emigrant Gap Road | Alberta | Emigrant Gap | Emigrant Gap Road | Montana | The Canadian port was originally called Fareham. It opened in 1932, but closed in 1939 when the highway through Del Bonita opened. It was once a favorite place to smuggle alcohol from the US into Alberta during its period of prohibition from 1916 to 1923, then from Canada during the US prohibition, which ended in 1933. | | 48°59′54.60″N 113°5′46.68″W |
| Pinhorn | Township Road 12 | Alberta | Laird | Laird Road | Montana | Canadian port of entry opened in 1913 and closed in 1929. Customs staff moved the office to Aden, Alberta without authorization, but Canada Customs decided that was a better location anyway. | | 48°59′52.44″N 110°59′25.08″W |
| Big Beaver | Highway 34 | Saskatchewan | Whitetail | S-511 | Montana | The Big Beaver-Whitetail crossing was established in 1951, where traffic was never extensive. In 2009, the US planned to use Recovery Act funds to upgrade its Whitetail border station. However, at the same time, Canada would be planning to close its Big Beaver station. CNN ran a story on how wasteful it would be to spend millions on this crossing. The reporter sat in the middle of the empty roadway during the report. Canada permanently closed their crossing on April 1, 2011, making it a southbound-only crossing. The U.S. POE closed on January 26, 2013. Canada demolished the Big Beaver border station soon after closure. The U.S. border station remains, though the roadway has been barricaded. | | 48°59′57.4″N 105°09′44.4″W |
| Beaubier | Saskatchewan Highway 707 | Saskatchewan | Westby | North Westby Road | Montana | The port of Westby, Montana, was established in 1919 and was revoked by Executive Order 9382 on September 23, 1943. Shortly before being designated a POE, the town of Westby moved a short distance from North Dakota into Montana to be closer to a new rail spur and to be in a state that permitted the sale of alcohol. | | 48°59′59.9″N 104°04′41.4″W |
| Northgate | Highway 9 | Saskatchewan | Northgate | ND 8 | North Dakota | This border crossing was established in 1913 to serve both highway and rail traffic. The US and Canadian Ports of Entry were abandoned in 1962 when a new highway and a new border station were built about a half mile to the west, bypassing the town. The former US border station was demolished in 2015, and the border community is a virtual ghost town. The building that once served as the Canadian border station remains. | | 48°59′55.68″N 102°15′58.32″W |
| West Lynne (Emerson West) | 5th Street | Manitoba | Pembina | US 81 | North Dakota | This crossing on the Meridian Highway, whose other end was at the Mexico–United States border in Laredo, Texas, was moderately trafficked through the 1950s, but it was closed in 1964 when Interstate 29 and Manitoba Highway 29 were built immediately to the west. The Canadian and US border stations were demolished, but the concrete slabs on which they stood remain. All road traffic must now use the modern Pembina–Emerson Border Crossing. | | 49°0′1.44″N 97°14′6.36″W |
| Emerson East | PTH 75 | Manitoba | Noyes | US 75 | Minnesota | Throughout the early 20th century, this was among the busiest U.S.–Canada border crossings. It was the point at which the Jefferson Highway intersected the international boundary and, for a few years, was adorned with an elaborate archway. Traffic waned with the 1964 opening of Interstate 29 two miles to the west. The crossing was closed by Canada in 2003 (where traffic was permitted southbound only) and then by the U.S. in 2006. All road traffic must now use the Pembina–Emerson Border Crossing. | | 49°0′0.00″N 97°12′26.28″W |
| Pigeon River | Old Border Rd (formerly Ontario Highway 61) | Ontario | Pigeon River | CR 89 (formerly MN 1 (1920) and US 61) | Minnesota | Formerly called Sextus City. The Outlaw Bridge, as it was known, was built in 1917. It was closed in 1961 when a new bridge and border station were built in Grand Portage, Minnesota about 6 miles to the east. The old bridge, store, hotel, and both border stations have all been demolished. | | 48°0′37.44″N 89°42′29.88″W |
| Niagara Falls | River Road | Ontario | Niagara Falls | Niagara Street | New York | The Honeymoon Bridge collapsed on January 27, 1938, after an ice jam undermined the structure. A new bridge named the Rainbow Bridge was built a short distance to the north, and new border inspection facilities were built on both sides. | | 43°5′20.4″N 79°4′8.4″W |
| Queenston | Niagara Regional Road 81 | Ontario | Lewiston | Robert Moses State Parkway | New York | The Queenston-Lewiston suspension bridge was replaced by the transverse-named Lewiston–Queenston Bridge in 1962, which was built about 0.7 miles (1.1 km) to the south. The bridge had a single line trolley track of the Niagara Gorge Railroad in the center of 3 lanes. The US inspection plaza has been transformed into the Earl W. Brydges Artpark State Park. | | 43°09′43″N 79°2′47.6″W |
| Cornwall | Highway 138 | Ontario | Massena | NY 37 | New York | The Canadian port of entry on Cornwall Island was closed June 1, 2009, due to a disagreement between the Mohawk Nation of Akwesasne and the Canada Border Services Agency regarding the arming of border services officers. A temporary port of entry was opened July 13, 2009, at the north end of the Seaway International Bridge north (high) span; it was used until the current "interim" port of entry was opened January 24, 2014. The old border station on Cornwall Island was demolished in July 2015. | | 44°59′26.37″N 74°44′22.26″W |
| Jamieson's Line | Chemin Jamieson | Québec | Jamieson Line | County Road 29 | New York | The Canadian port of entry was permanently closed on April 1, 2011. For three years, this was a one-way crossing, with travelers able to enter the U.S. but not Canada at this location. Finally, the U.S. port of entry closed on August 21, 2014. Both the US and Canada border stations have since been demolished. | | 44°59′30.26″N 74°10′28.78″W |
| Roxham Road | Rang Roxham | Québec | Roxham Road | Roxham Road | New York | Canada operated a port of entry at this location until the late 1950s, and the building is now a private residence. The US never had a border station at this location. This crossing has been barricaded since the 1970s. Starting in 2017, thousands of migrants made unauthorized entry into Canada on foot at this location so they could request asylum. RCMP established temporary facilities at this crossing to aid in processing the surge in asylum seekers. Canadian regulations regarding asylum procedures were changed in 2023, ending the surge, and the temporary facilities were subsequently demolished after more than 100,000 immigrants requested asylum there. | | 45°0′25.56″N 73°31′1.92″W |
| Blackpool | Chemin Ridge | Québec | Champlain | US 9 | New York | The border crossing on US 9 closed in 1967 when I-87 was completed immediately to the west. The last border station at this crossing was built in 1950 and was demolished soon after it closed in 1967. | | 45°0′32.76″N 73°26′30.84″W |
| Saint-Bernard-de-Lacolle - 217 | R-217 | Québec | Meridian Road | Meridian Road | New York | The port of entry on Meridian Road closed around 1950. The Canada border station was demolished in the mid-1950s. The USDA has since used the old US border station as an office, and the US Government at one time offered it for sale. | | 45°0′32.76″N 73°26′30.48″W |
| Highwater | Chemin Lafond | Québec | North Troy | Space Research Corporation Road | Vermont | In the 1960s and 1970s, Space Research Corporation founder Gerald Bull built his company on property his family owned on both sides of the border. As the company began building military weapons, the US established a border inspection station outside the company's south gate to inspect southbound traffic. This station also enabled US workers to legally return home after work without having to go through the North Troy border crossing, and it was not for use by the general public. Canada did not have a border station on the company's north gate. The SRC facility (and the Customs station) closed in 1980 when Bull was convicted of violating an arms embargo against South Africa. Bull was assassinated in 1990. | | 45°0′30.60″N 72°26′58.20″W |
| Mansonville | Chemin du Pont-Couvert | Québec | North Troy | Douglas Road | Vermont | Also known as "Province Hill", Canada Customs closed this office around 1972. The building is now purple and privately owned, but in the 1980s, it was rented as a vacation home. Prior to its construction in the 1960s, Canada Customs operated out of a line house across the street. This building was separated, moved about a half mile North, and used as cottages. The US did not have a border station at this crossing; persons entering were expected to travel to the North Troy border station for inspection. | | 45°0′22.68″N 72°22′28.92″W |
| Leadville | Chemin des Parulines | Québec | Newport | Leadville Road | Vermont | Canada Customs had a station from the mid-1930s to 1939, then reopened in 1948. It was replaced with a new border station in the mid-1950s, which permanently closed on March 31, 1969. The Canada border station was converted into a private home that has been updated substantially. There was no US border station at this location; persons entering the US here were expected to travel to the US Customs office at 70 Main Street, Newport, VT, to report for inspection. That office closed in 1972, and the road was barricaded. Today, the former US Customs office is home to Northeast Kingdom Community Action. | | 45°0′15.12″N 72°16′28.56″W |
| Leadville | Chemin de Leadville | Québec | Newport | Lake Road | Vermont | Although this was a busy road with many lakeside homes, neither the US nor Canada had a border station here. Persons entering the US here were expected to travel to the US Customs office at 70 Main Street, Newport, VT, to report for inspection. That office closed in 1972, and the road was barricaded at the border at that time. | | 45°0′15.84″N 72°15′30.60″W |
| Lineboro | Chemin de Nord Derby | Québec | North Derby | North Derby Road | Vermont | Canada provided Customs service at this road and rail crossing from 1932 to 1937 and from 1949–1953. The U.S. never had Customs services here. Persons entering the US at this location were expected to travel to the US Customs office at 70 Main Street, Newport, VT, to report for inspection. That office closed in 1972, and the road was barricaded at the border at that time. Today, the Canada border station is a private home. | | 45°0′21.10″N 72°10′19.20″W |
| Stanhope | Rue Principale | Québec | Norton | Nelson Road | Vermont | Historically, signs directed travelers to report directly to the staffed Stanhope-Norton border station. It has been barricaded since 2015. This crossing is the site of an international general store and post office, which closed around 2002. | | 45°0′38.16″N 71°47′55.32″W |
| Daaquam | Rang Sainte-Marie | Québec | Daaquam | American Realty Road | Maine | Crossing, which mostly served the logging industry, closed in 2004 when regular customs service was moved to St. Juste. The road is now barricaded. | | 46°35′53.16″N 70°1′4.80″W |
| Grand Falls | Caswell Road | New Brunswick | Caswell | (unnamed road) | Maine | The US operated a border inspection station between 1936 and 1953. The General Services Administration purchased approximately a half-acre of land in 1931 and constructed a red brick border station. The property was sold by the US government on October 13, 1954, and although the included the brick building, it has since been demolished. The parcel and the road leading to the border from Route 1A are now private property. It is not known whether Canada had a border station on Caswell Road. | | 47°02′29.7″N 67°47′24.2″W |
| Four Falls | Brown Road | New Brunswick | East Road | Russell Road | Maine | US border station closed in the 1960s. However, until 2008, US-bound traffic was permitted to use the road to the Aroostook Valley Country Club, which is in both countries. Several Canadian properties can only be accessed via the US part of the road, which pre-dates the establishment of the border; several residents have experienced harassment from U.S. Border Patrol officers since 9/11. The Canadian border station was open seasonally until 2020, when it was closed due to the Covid-19 Pandemic. It was never reopened and the closure was made permanent in 2026. | | 46°49′24.21″N 67°47′22.65″W |
| Tinker | Tinker Road | New Brunswick | Fort Fairfield | Aroostook Falls Road | Maine | The US operated a border station at this crossing from 1941 to 1953. It was located about 500 feet west of the Canada–US border, with a private home standing between it and the border. The General Services Administration purchased the property for the border station on May 20, 1940, and placed a portable building on the property. GSA removed the building and sold the property on October 21, 1955. In 1970, the Canadian Magazine declared this crossing "The best place to sneak across the border," The road was barricaded around 1976. The Aroostook River flood of 1994 killed 2 Canadian Customs officers whose vehicle was swept into a ditch by rising flood waters at this crossing. | | 46°47′36.24″N 67°47′22.56″W |
| Hillandale | Reid Road | New Brunswick | Monson Hill | Dorsey Road | Maine | This crossing closed in the 1940s. Aside from some light fixtures, no signs of the border crossing remain. | | 46°42′7.20″N 67°47′20.04″W |
| Beaconsfield | Nicholson Road | New Brunswick | Easton | Curtis Road | Maine | Canada stopped providing Customs services in the late 1950s and erected a sign directing travelers to the nearest open crossing. The US moved its border services to the Rivière de Chute crossing from a more central location on Ladner Road. The crossing was barricaded in the 1980s. | | 46°39′9.36″N 67°47′18.96″W |
| Listerville | Mars Hill Road | New Brunswick | Mars Hill | Knoxford Line Road | Maine | Border inspection services were established in 1939 and closed in 1976. The US crossing was also known as the Knoxford Line and was housed in a temporary trailer. The General Services Administration deemed the US border station property to be excess on November 3, 1977, and it was subsequently sold. The Canada border station has been renovated, and today it serves as a private home. | | 46°34′9.12″N 67°47′15.00″W |
| Upper Royalton | Brown Road | New Brunswick | Blaine | Brown Road | Maine | This crossing was generally known as "Brown Road" on both sides of the border. The US border station was housed in a temporary trailer. It existed for only a few years, from 1941 to 1952. The US sold the 1-acre border station site on May 22, 1953. | | 46°30′13.6″N 67°47′09.6″W |
| Jackson Falls | Foxcroft Road | New Brunswick | Littleton | Foxcroft Road | Maine | This crossing, known as "Starkey Corners," opened in 1936 and was permanently closed on May 19, 1962. The General Services Administration purchased the US border station property on May 20, 1932, and sold it (building included) on January 26, 1966. The US border station is now a private home. The Canadian station was demolished in the late 1960s. | | 46°13′3.00″N 67°46′54.12″W |
| Woodstock | Old Houlton Road | New Brunswick | Houlton | US 2 | Maine | Before the 1950s, the Canadian road to this crossing traversed a steep hill at the border, which caused problems for winter travelers. Around 1952, Canada excavated much of the hill and built a new inspection plaza on relatively level ground. This border crossing was closed in 1985 when I-95 was completed immediately to the north. The Canada border station, which was sometimes called Richmond Road, was demolished. The US border station and adjacent staff residences remain in disrepair. | | 46°8′0.00″N 67°46′52.32″W |
| Union Corner | Green Road | New Brunswick | East Hodgdon | Boundary Line Road | Maine | This border crossing, known as "Union Corner", was permanently closed on May 19, 1962. The General Services Administration sold the US border station on August 16, 1965, and it has since been used as a private home. The Canadian station was torn down in the late 1960s. | | 46°3′14.40″N 67°46′51.60″W |
| Monument | Amity Road | New Brunswick | North Amity | Monument Road | Maine | The US purchased 12,580 square feet of land on the south side of Monument Road on May 25, 1932, and spent $5,625 to erect a red brick border station, which saw little traffic. This crossing was about 2000 feet north of Monument #1, which marks the beginning of the land border between the US and Canada. On February 19, 1949, the US sold the property and the border station. The building has since been demolished. | | 45°56′56.1″N 67°46′52.5″W |
| Upper Mills | Hall Road | New Brunswick | Baring | Front Street | Maine | This crossing closed in 1948 when the bridge was deemed unsafe. It was dismantled soon thereafter. The US did not have a Customs station at this crossing. | | 45°8′12.48″N 67°19′5.88″W |
| St. Stephen | Route 170 | New Brunswick | Calais | Todd Street | Maine | This crossing, also known as "Union Bridge", closed in 1961 when the bridge was deemed unsafe. It was dismantled in April 1963, and two men drowned in the process. The US border station property was sold on May 14, 1962, and still stands as a private residence. The former Canadian border station on Milltown Boulevard in St. Stephen is likewise serving as a private home. | | 45°11′00.2″N 67°17′29.6″W |

== See also ==
- Canada Border Services Agency
- U.S. Customs and Border Protection
- American entry into Canada by land
- Border town
- List of Mexico–United States border crossings
- List of international bridges in North America
