= Hamlin–Grand Falls Border Crossing =

Border crossing between the United States and Canada

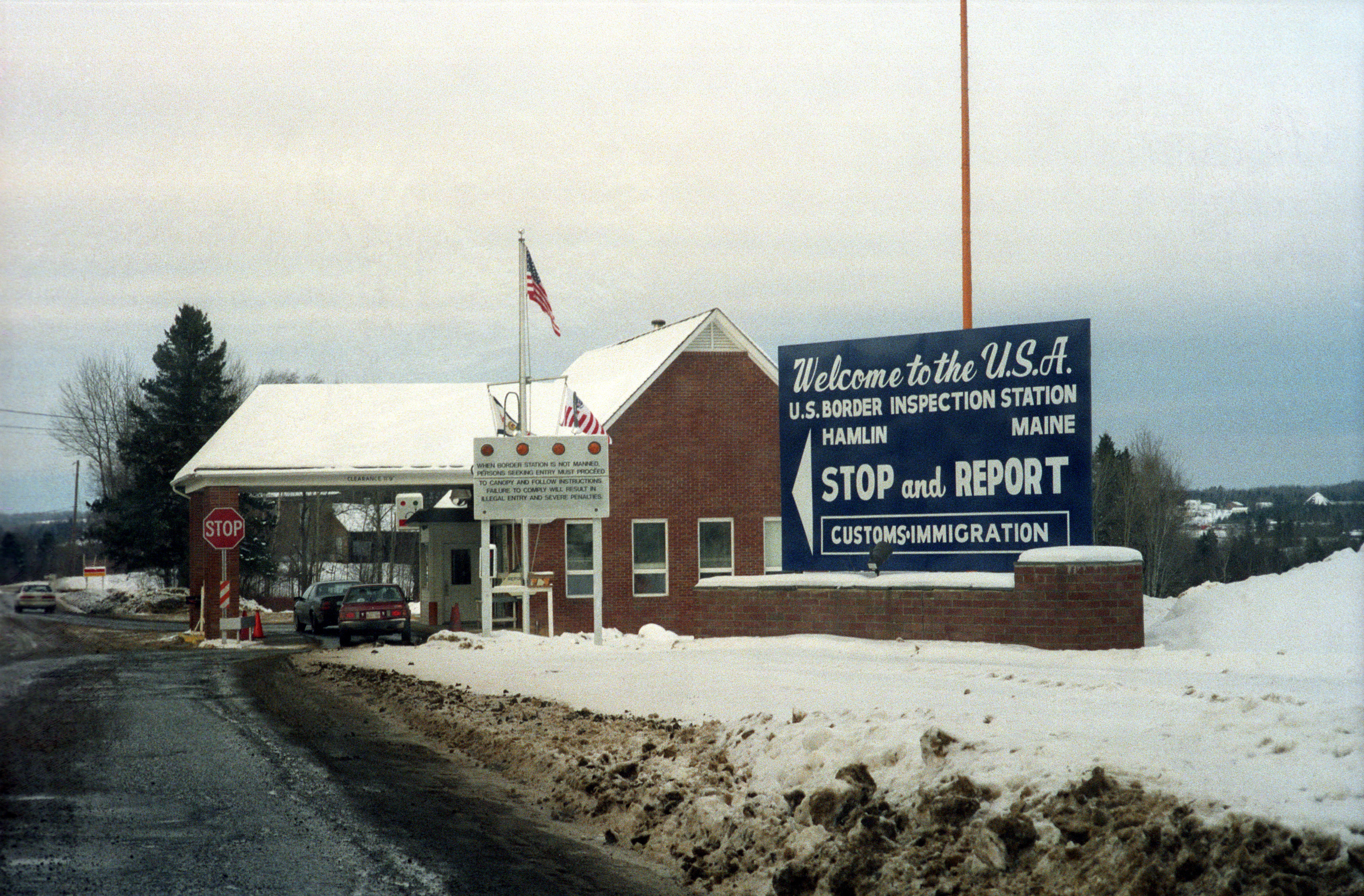
- The US Border Inspection Station at Hamlin, Maine as seen in 1991

Locaiton
- Country: United States; Canada
- Location: Route 218 / Boundaryline Road; US Port: 160 Boundaryline Road, Hamlin, ME 04736; Canadian Port: 1015 Main Street, Grand Falls NB E3Z 2X1
- Coordinates: 47.060698°N 67.790177°W

Details
- Opened: 1953

Website
- https://www.cbp.gov/about/contact/ports/van-buren-maine-0108; https://www.cbsa-asfc.gc.ca/do-rb/offices-bureaux/79-eng.html

The Hamlin–Grand Falls Border Crossing connects the towns of Hamlin, Maine and Grand Falls, New Brunswick on the Canada–US border. The crossing is reached by Boundaryline Road on the American side and by New Brunswick Route 218 on the Canadian side. It is the northernmost border crossing on Maine's north–south land border with New Brunswick. In 2011, the United States replaced its border inspection facilities, which were originally built in 1964.

== See also ==
- List of Canada–United States border crossings
