= John Morris (archdeacon of St Andrews) =

John Frederick Morris was a Canadian Anglican priest, most notably Archdeacon of St Andrews in the Diocese of Montreal from 1940 until 1967.

Morris was educated at McGill University and the General Theological Seminary, New York and ordained in 1914. After a curacy at Glen Sutton he held incumbencies in Verdun and Montreal.
