= Jamieson Line Border Crossing =

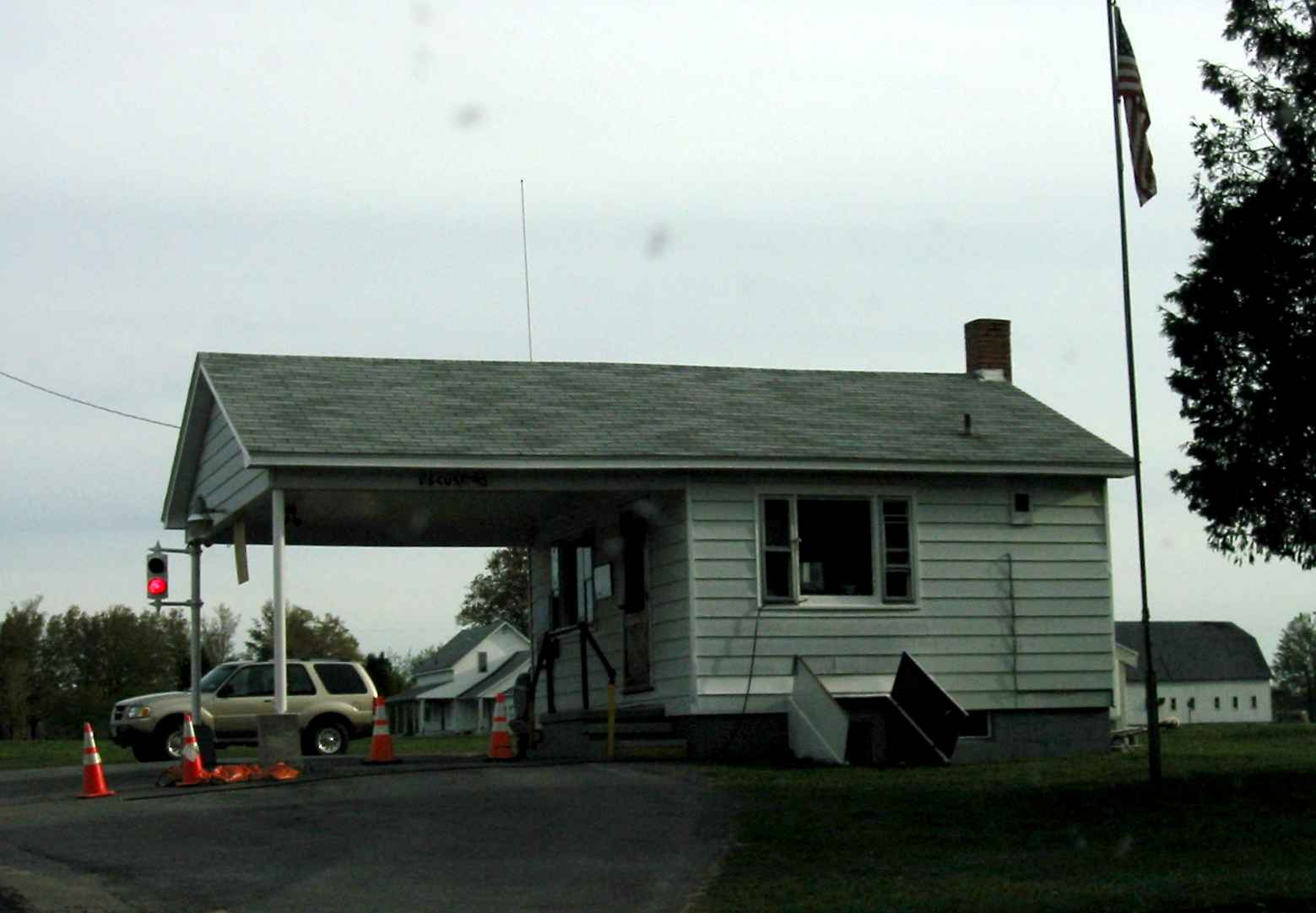
- Jamieson Line, NY Border Inspection Station

Location
- Country: United States; Canada
- Location: US Port: 1003 County Road 29, Burke, New York 12917; Canadian Port: None
- Coordinates: 44.991748°N 74.174685°W

Details
- Opened: 1945

Jamieson Line is a closed border crossing connecting Athelstan, Quebec to Burke, New York on the Canada–US border. Canada closed its port of entry on April 1, 2011, and tore down its border inspection station in 2012. The US Customs and Border Protection closed its port of entry on August 21, 2014.

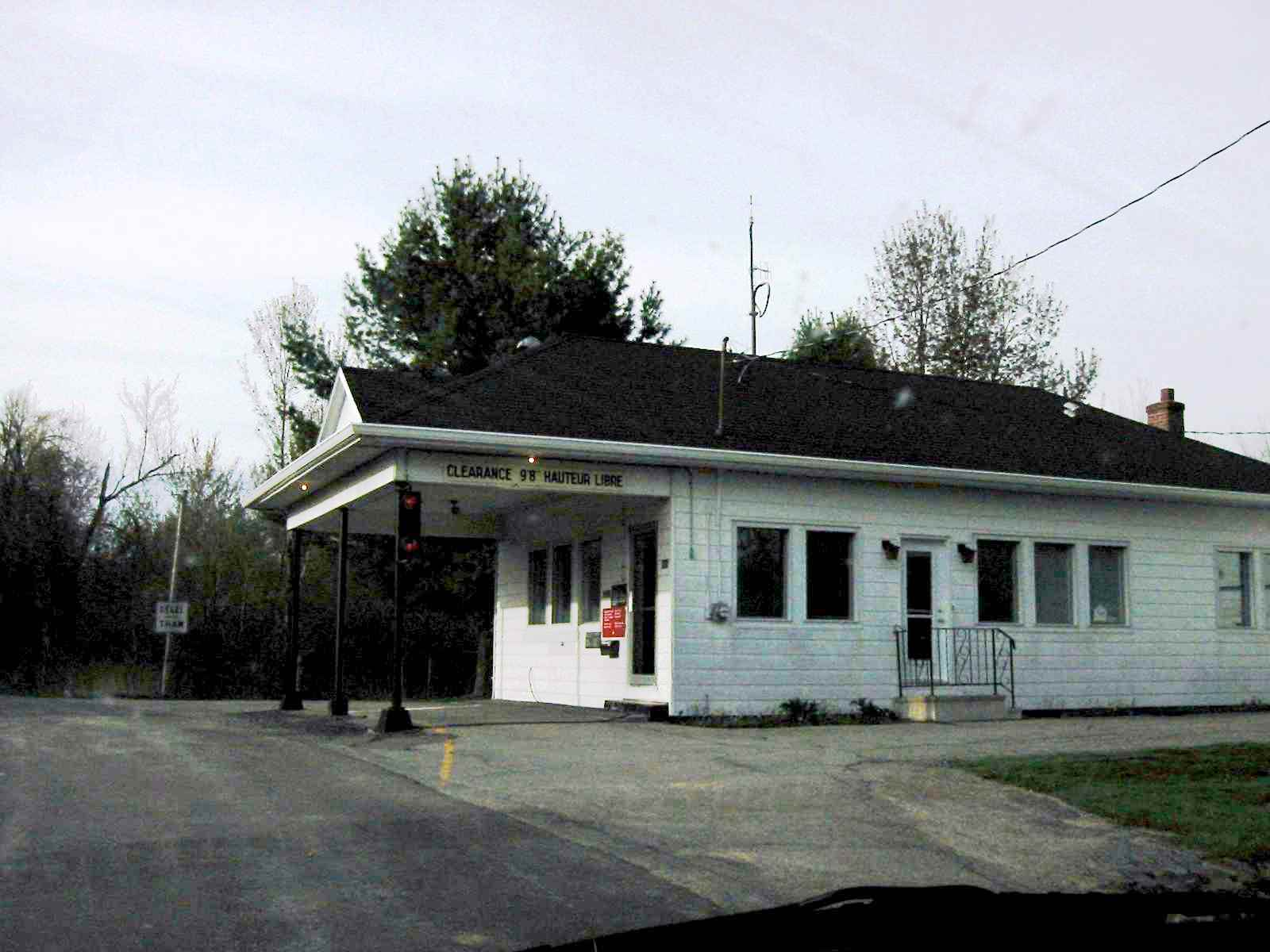
Canada Border Inspection Station at Jamieson Line as seen in 2001. This building was closed and subsequently demolished in 2011.

== See also ==
- List of Canada–United States border crossings
