= Del Bonita Border Crossing =

Border crossing between Canada and the United States

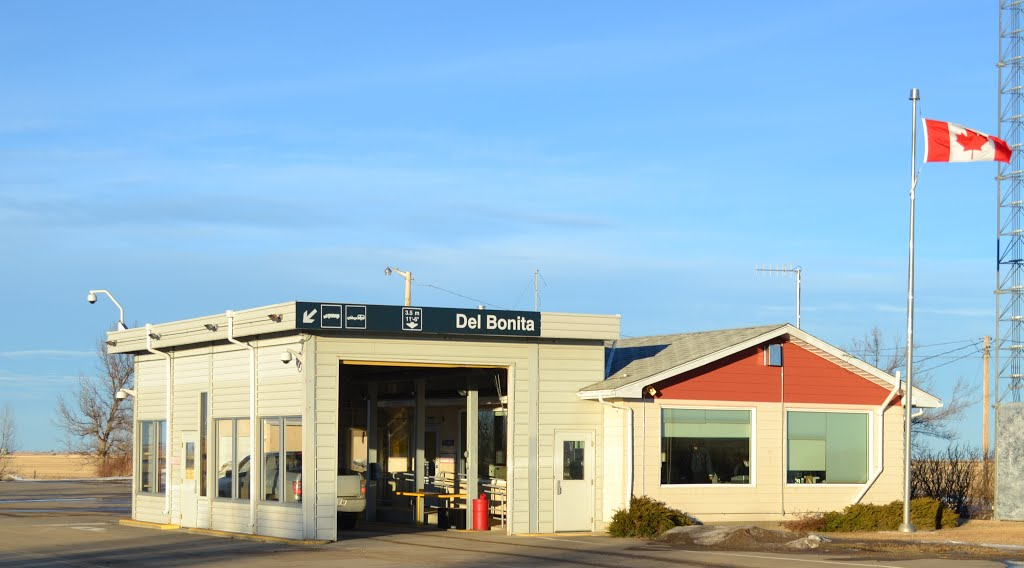
- Canada Border Inspection Station at Del Bonita, Alberta

Location
- Country: United States; Canada
- Location: S-213 / Highway 62; US Port: 4071 Chalk Butte Road, Cut Bank, Montana 59427; Canadian Port: Highway #62 South, Del Bonita, Alberta T0K 0S0
- Coordinates: 48.998554°N 112.78836°W

Details
- Opened: 1939

Website
- http://www.cbp.gov/contact/ports/del-bonita-mt

The Del Bonita Border Crossing connects the town of Cut Bank, Montana with Del Bonita, Alberta on the Canada–US border. It is reached by Montana Secondary Highway 213 on the American side and Alberta Highway 62 on the Canadian side. The crossing was established in 1939, when the highway was completed. At that time, the nearby crossing at Whiskey Gap was permanently closed. Today, there is little activity near this crossing on either side of the border, although the grass runway of the Whetstone International Airport runs along the boundary on the east side of the road. In 2012, the US replaced its border inspection station, which was built in 1962.

== See also ==
- List of Canada–United States border crossings
