= Minnesota State Highway 310 =

State highway in Minnesota, United States

Trunk Highway 310
- MN 310 highlighted in red

Route information
- Maintained by MnDOT
- Length: 10.495 mi (16.890 km)
- Existed: April 24, 1959–present

Major junctions
- South end: MN 11 / MN 89 in Roseau
- North end: PR 310 at the Canadian border near South Junction, Manitoba

Location
- Country: United States
- State: Minnesota
- Counties: Roseau

Highway system
- Minnesota Trunk Highway System; Interstate; US; State; Legislative; Scenic
← MN 308	→ MN 313

Trunk Highway 310 (MN 310) is a highway in northwest Minnesota, which runs from its intersection with MN 11 and MN 89 in Roseau and continues north to its northern terminus at the Canadian border; where the route becomes Manitoba Provincial Road 310 (PR 310) upon crossing the border, near the community of South Junction, Manitoba. The highway is 10.5 miles (16.9 km) in length.

== Route description ==
MN 310 begins at a four-way intersection in Roseau with MN 11 to the east and west, and MN 89 to the south and west. MN 310 travels north through the city as 5th Avenue NW. It passes just west of the Roseau County Fairgrounds before leaving the city and continuing north through rural northern Minnesota. A few miles north of Roseau, the route crosses the Roseau River, then bends slightly to the east to avoid crossing it twice. North of the Roseau River, the highway crosses the Sprague Creek before entering the Lost River State Forest. MN 310 treks through the forest for a few miles, then curves to the northeast just south of the Canadian border. The route then reaches the border and continues into Manitoba as PR 310.

== History ==
MN 310 was authorized on April 24, 1959. At this time, the route was unpaved. The portion between the Canadian border and Sprague Creek was paved in 1962, and the remainder was paved in 1965.

== Major intersections ==
The entire route is in Roseau County.

Location	mi	km	Destinations	Notes
Roseau	0.000	0.000	MN 11 / MN 89 – Greenbush, Bemidji, Warroad	Southern terminus; roadway continues south as MN 89
Jadis Township	1.993	3.207	CSAH 16 west	
Jadis Township	2.977	4.791	CSAH 28 east	
Dieter Township	10.484	16.872	PR 310 north – South Junction	Canada border; Roseau-South Junction Border Crossing; northern terminus
1.000 mi = 1.609 km; 1.000 km = 0.621 mi
