= Easton–River de Chute Border Crossing =

Border Crossing on the US-Canada Border

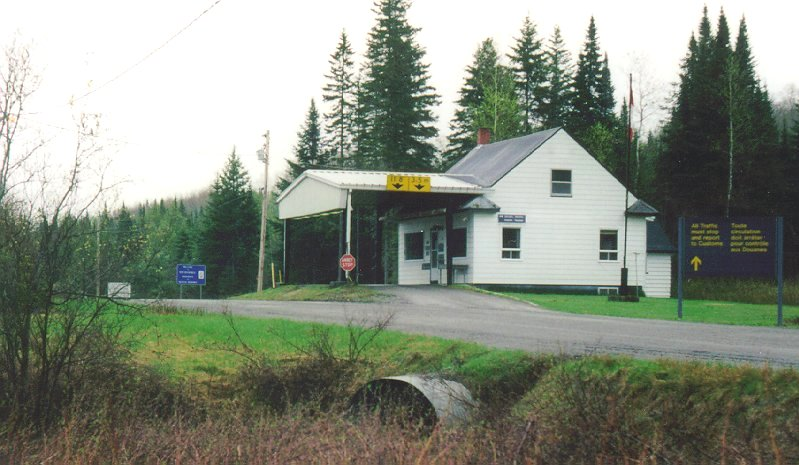
- The Canada Border Inspection Station at River de Chute, New Brunswick as seen in 1998.

Locaiton
- Country: United States; Canada
- Location: Ladner Road / Smugglers Road; US Port: Ladner Road, Easton ME 04740; Canadian Port: 205 Smugglers Road, River De Chute NB E7H 4X5
- Coordinates: 46.600364°N 67.788305°W

Details
- Opened: 1936

Website
- http://www.cbp.gov/contact/ports/fort-fairfield

The Easton–River de Chute Border Crossing connects the towns of Easton, Maine and Wicklow, New Brunswick on the Canada–US border. Historically, two roads entered Easton from Canada, but in the late 1950s, the Canada closed its Beaconsfield crossing on Nicholson Road, so the US government moved its border station from its original location near the intersection of Ladner and Curtis Roads. After the move, the US Customs Service operated out of at least three different mobile trailers until 2012, when it finally constructed a permanent border inspection station.

The crossing is open for limited hours every day; the nearby Fort Fairfield–Andover Border Crossing is open 24 hours a day. About 4,000 crossings use the station a year, or an average of fewer than 11 a day.

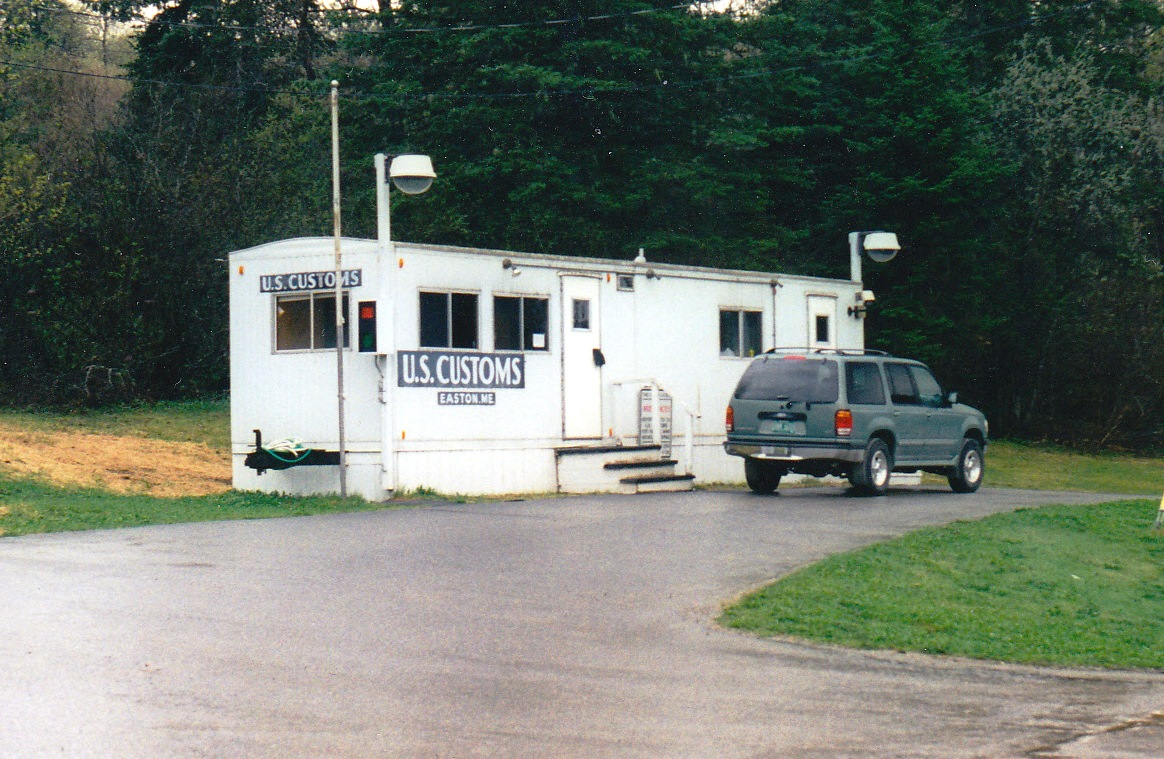
US Border station at Easton, Maine as seen in 1996. This building was replaced in 2012.

== See also ==
- List of Canada–United States border crossings
