= Missisquoi River Bridge =

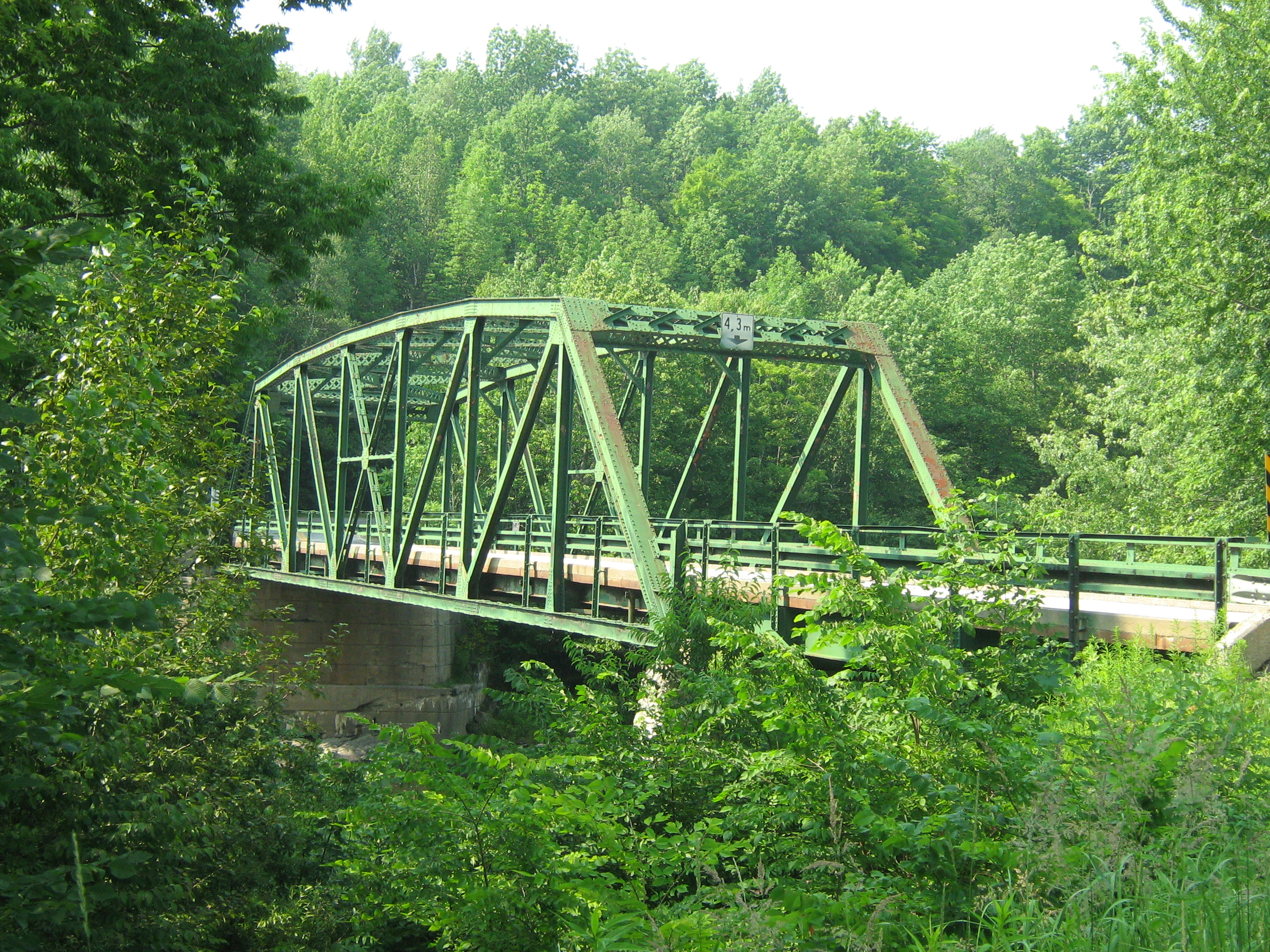
- Coordinates: 45°0′49″N 72°35′16″W
- Carries: VT 105A and Chemin de la Vallée Missisquoi
- Crosses: Missisquoi River
- Locale: The Canada–United States border between Richford, Vermont and Sutton, Quebec

Characteristics
- Design: Parker through truss bridge

History
- Opened: 1929

Statistics
- Missisquoi River Bridge
- U.S. National Register of Historic Places
- Area: less than 1 acre (0.40 ha)
- Built by: Pittsburgh-Des Moines Steel Co.
- MPS: Metal Truss, Masonry, and Concrete Bridges in Vermont MPS
- NRHP reference No.: 90001494
- Added to NRHP: October 11, 1990

Location
- Interactive map of Missisquoi River Bridge

The Mississquoi River Bridge (known in Canada as the Pont de la Vallée) is a steel truss bridge, spanning the Missisquoi River between Richford, Vermont and Sutton, Quebec on the Canada–United States border. It connects Chemin de la Vallée Missisquoi in Sutton with Vermont Route 105A in Richford, between the border stations of the East Richford–Glen Sutton Border Crossing. The bridge was built by the state of Vermont in 1929, and is one of two in the state built by the Pittsburgh-Des Moines Steel Company. It was listed on the United States National Register of Historic Places in 1990.

== Description and history ==
The Missisquoi River Bridge is located in northeastern Richford and southeastern Sutton, at a point where the Missisquoi River flows across the international border (an east-west line) in a roughly southwesterly direction. The bridge is just northwest of the small village of East Richford, with only Canada's Glen Sutton border station in the immediate vicinity north of the border. The bridge is a two-span metal Parker through truss structure, 205 feet (62 m) in length, and was assembled with riveted construction. The trusses rest on abutments and a pier of poured concrete. One span is 150 feet (45.72 m) long, and the other is 50 feet (15.24 m) long. The bridge is 21.6 feet (6.58 m) wide, and carries two lanes of traffic on a concrete deck. The maximum truss depth is 19 feet (5.79 m) and the end portals have clearance of 15 feet (4.57 m).

The bridge was built by the state of Vermont in 1929, as part of a program to build more than 1,200 bridges after devastating floods in 1927. The bridge was manufactured by the Pittsburgh-Des Moines Steel Company, and is only one of two known bridges in the state to be built by that firm. The bridge exhibits characteristics of standardized design developed by the state to speed construction of bridges at the time. The border crossing point was at the time economically important, providing access to the markets of southern Quebec to the industries in Richford.

The bridge was closed for rehabilitation between early 2018 and its reopening on October 7, 2019.

== Border crossing ==
The East Richford–Glen Sutton Border Crossing connects the towns of Sutton, Quebec and Richford, Vermont via the Missisquoi River Bridge on the Canada–US border. In 1936, the United States built a large border station which is still in use today, and is also listed on the National Register of Historic Places.

== See also ==
- National Register of Historic Places listings in Franklin County, Vermont
- List of bridges on the National Register of Historic Places in Vermont
- List of Canada–United States border crossings
- List of international bridges in North America
