= Saint Just de Bretenières–St. Juste Maine Border Crossing =

Canada–United States border crossing

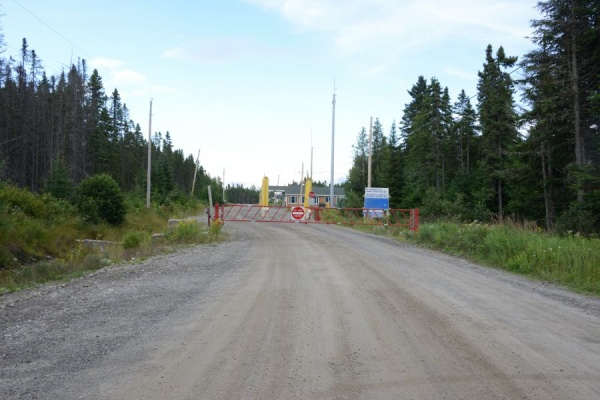
- US-Canada boundary at St. Juste

Locaiton
- Country: United States; Canada
- Location: St. Juste Road / Rue des Moulins; US Port: Stetson Road, St Juste, ME 04737; Canadian Port: Rue des Moulins, Saint-Just-de-Bretenières, Quebec G0R 3H0
- Coordinates: 46.546622°N 69.994603°W

Details
- Opened: 2003

Website
- http://www.cbp.gov/contact/ports/jackman

The Saint Just de Bretenières–St. Juste Maine Border Crossing is primarily used by Canadian logging trucks to access the privately owned land in Maine. This crossing was opened in 2003 when it was determined that access for logging operations was better at this location than at Daaquam about 3 miles to the north. New facilities were built at St. Juste and the border services staff were moved there. The Daaquam crossing was closed and barricaded.

== History ==
Prior to May 1, 2003, St Juste was known as a "Form 1" crossing, meaning that the crossing was only open to the private companies that needed to use it, and were issued a permit to cross the border without inspection. The Form 1 program was terminated at that time, and other such crossings were either permanently closed or provided with inspection staff and facilities.

== See also ==
- List of Canada–United States border crossings
