= Manitoba Provincial Road 310 =

Provincial road in Manitoba, Canada

Provincial Road 310
- PR 310 highlighted in red

Route information
- Maintained by Department of Infrastructure
- Length: 4 km (2.5 mi)
- Existed: 1966–present

Major junctions
- South end: MN 310 at the U.S. border near South Junction
- North end: PTH 12 at South Junction

Location
- Country: Canada
- Province: Manitoba
- Rural municipalities: Piney

Highway system
- Provincial highways in Manitoba; Winnipeg City Routes
← PR 309	→ PR 311

Provincial Road 310 (PR 310) is a short provincial road in the southeast corner of Manitoba, Canada. It runs from PTH 12 at South Junction to the United States border, where it connects with Minnesota State Highway 310, which leads to the city of Roseau. The Roseau–South Junction Border Crossing is lightly travelled and used mostly by local residents.

== Major intersections ==
Division	Location	km	mi	Destinations	Notes
Piney		0.0	0.0	MN 310 south – Roseau	United States border; Roseau-South Junction Border Crossing; southern terminus
Piney	South Junction	4.0	2.5	PTH 12 (MOM's Way) – Steinbach, Sprague; Main Street – South Junction	Northern terminus; road continues as Main Street
1.000 mi = 1.609 km; 1.000 km = 0.621 mi
