= East Richford–Glen Sutton Border Crossing =

Canada–United States border crossing

East Richford-Glen Sutton Border Crossing
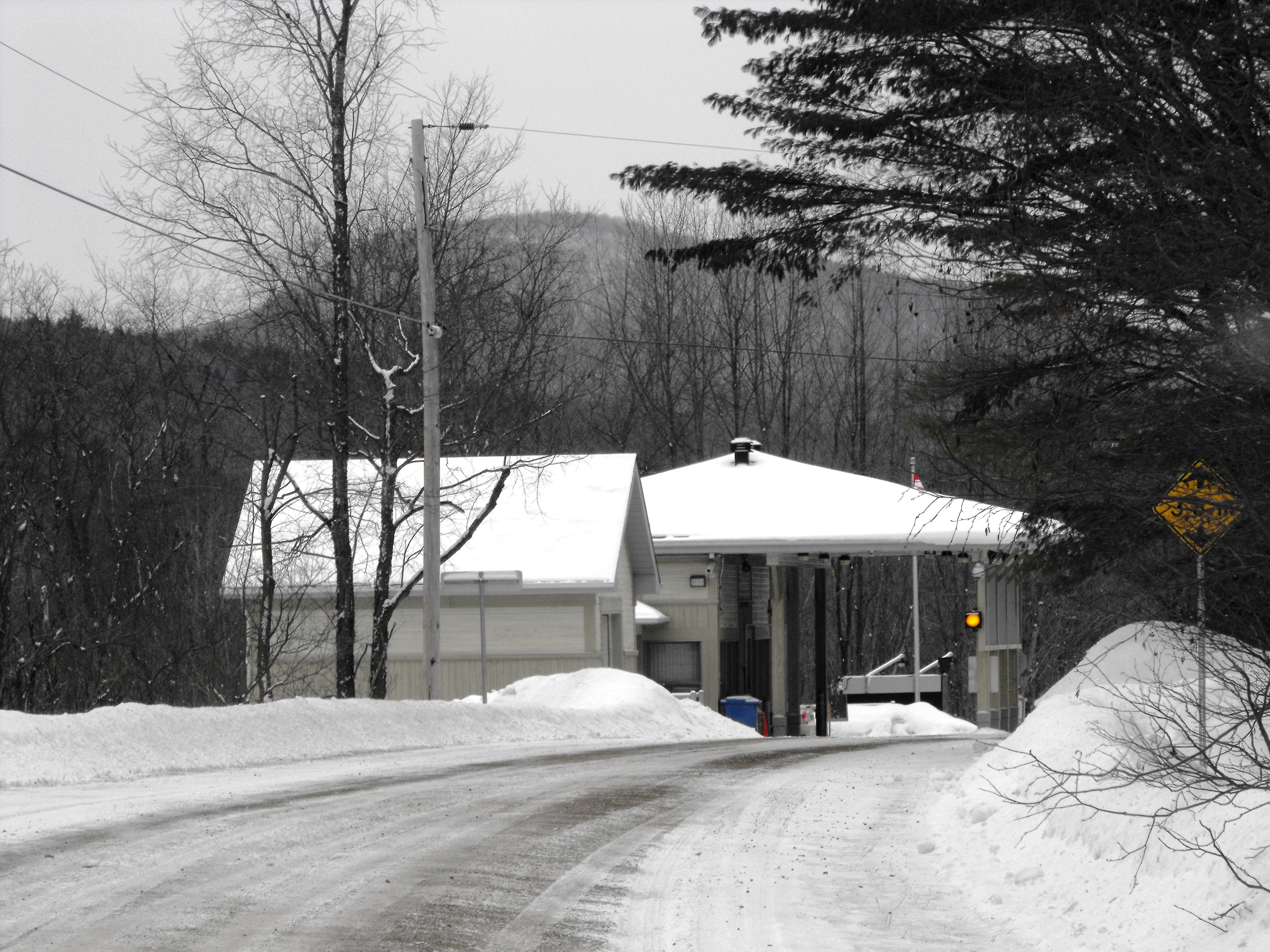
- Canada Border Station at Glen Sutton

Location
- Country: United States; Canada
- Location: VT 105A / Chemin de la Vallée-Missisquoi / Missisquoi River Bridge; US Port: 357 Glen Sutton Road, Richford, Vermont 05476; Canadian Port: 139 Missisquoi Valley Road, Sutton, Quebec J0E 2K0
- Coordinates: 45.01183°N 72.588193°W

Details
- Opened: 1926

Website
- Official US web site; Official Canadian web site
- U.S. Inspection Station-East Richford, Vermont
- U.S. National Register of Historic Places
- MPS: U.S. Border Inspection Stations MPS
- NRHP reference No.: 14000604
- Added to NRHP: September 10, 2014

The East Richford–Glen Sutton Border Crossing connects the towns of Sutton, Quebec and Richford, Vermont on the Canada–US border. During the early 20th century, this scenic road was a major east–west thoroughfare. In 1936, the United States built a large border station that is still in use today, and is listed on the National Register of Historic Places. By coincidence, the actual border crossing is on the Missisquoi River Bridge, built in 1929 and also listed on the US National Register. The original bridge, built in 1926, was destroyed only a year later in the Great Vermont Flood of 1927. The US and the Canadian stations are open daily from 8:00am to 4:00pm.

== Setting ==
The border crossing is set in a rural area, where the international boundary is a straight east–west line. The border is crossed by the Missisquoi River, which flows southwest from Quebec into Vermont. The actual crossing is on the Missisquoi River Bridge, a metal truss bridge built in 1929 after the previous bridge was washed away by flooding in 1927. The Canadian side of the border is a rural wooded area, with only the border station in the immediate vicinity. A secondary road and railroad tracks parallel the river to the east, while Missisquoi Valley Road, where the border station is, runs parallel to the west. The United States side of the border is also rural, with the small village of East Richford just east of the river. The railroad tracks continue to parallel the river as it flows southwest, as does Vermont Route 105A.

== United States station ==
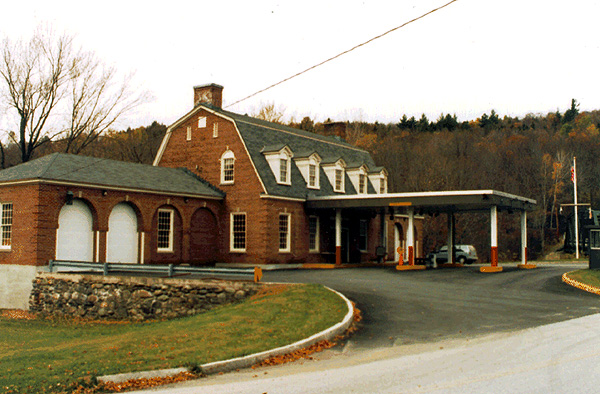
The East Richford border station, 2003

The United States station is located at a bend in Vermont 105A, which bounds its parcel to the north and east. It is bounded to the west by the river, and the south by Lucas Brook. The station is a two-story brick building with Colonial Revival styling. It has a gambrel roof pierced by gabled dormers, and is flanked by single-story gable-roofed wings housing four garage bays each. The garage bays have rounded-arch openings, and on both sides the two bays nearest the center have been filled in for conversion of the space to living spaces. The main block is five bays wide, and is symmetrical, with a center entrance providing access to separate facilities for immigration and customs processing. A porte-cochere extends forward from the center of the building, providing two travel lanes with shelter.

This station was built in 1931 with funding from the Public Works Administration, and is one of three border stations of this form built in Vermont during the 1930s. It was built in anticipation of a high volume of business on what was historically a relatively busy port of entry, and is identical in original form to the stations at Beecher Falls (still standing) and Highgate Springs (demolished). It was built as part of a program by the United States government to increase border security following a rise in automobile transportation, and over increases in smuggling occasioned by Prohibition.

== Canada station ==
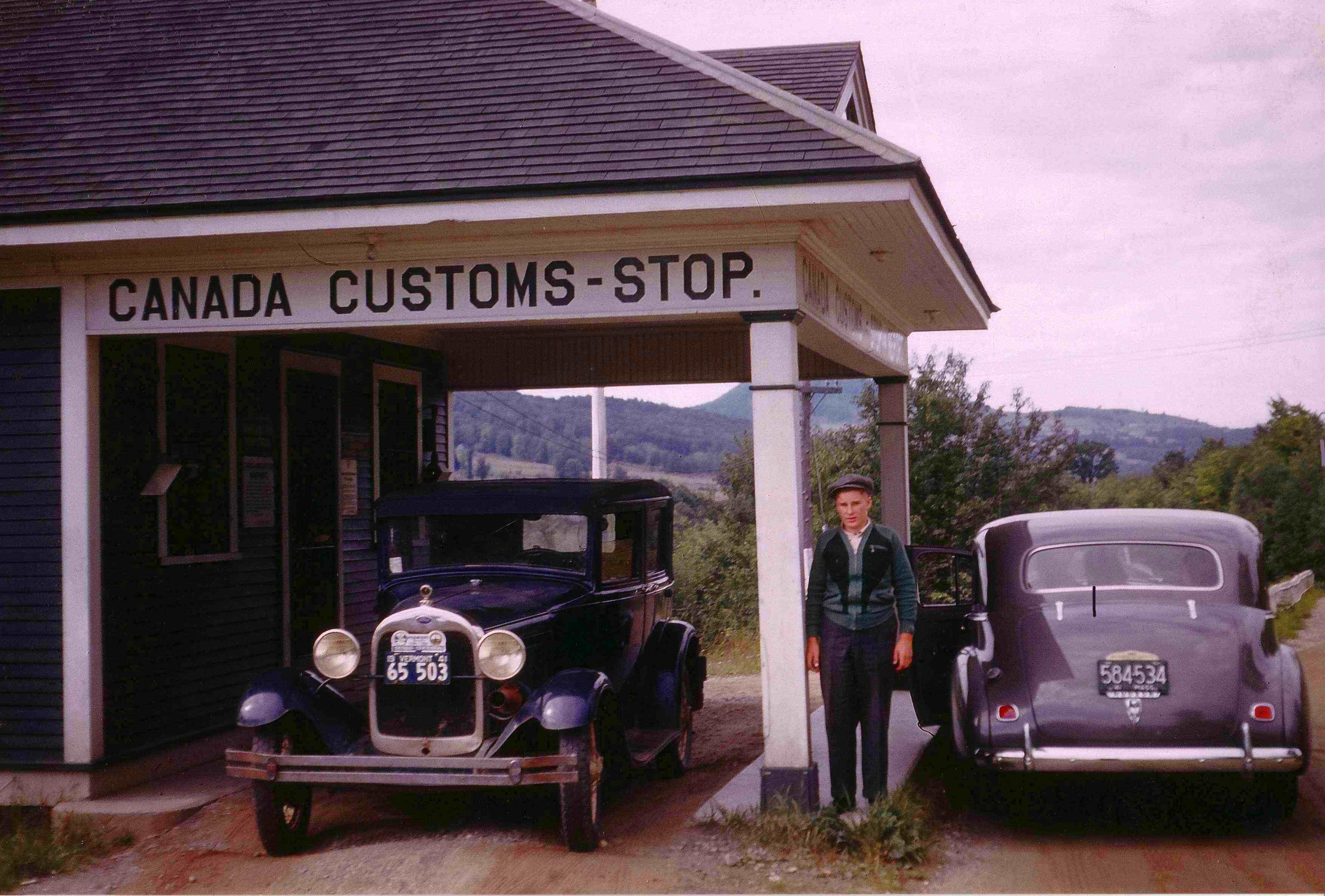
Glen Sutton border station as seen in 1941

The Canadian station is located on the southeast side of Missisquoi Valley Road (Chemin de la Vallée Missisquoi), a short way north of the bridge. Canada replaced its border station in 1960. The Canadian station is open from 8:00 to 16:00 on every day of the week.

== See also ==
- List of Canada–United States border crossings
- National Register of Historic Places listings in Franklin County, Vermont
