= Roseau–South Junction Border Crossing =

Canada–United States border crossing

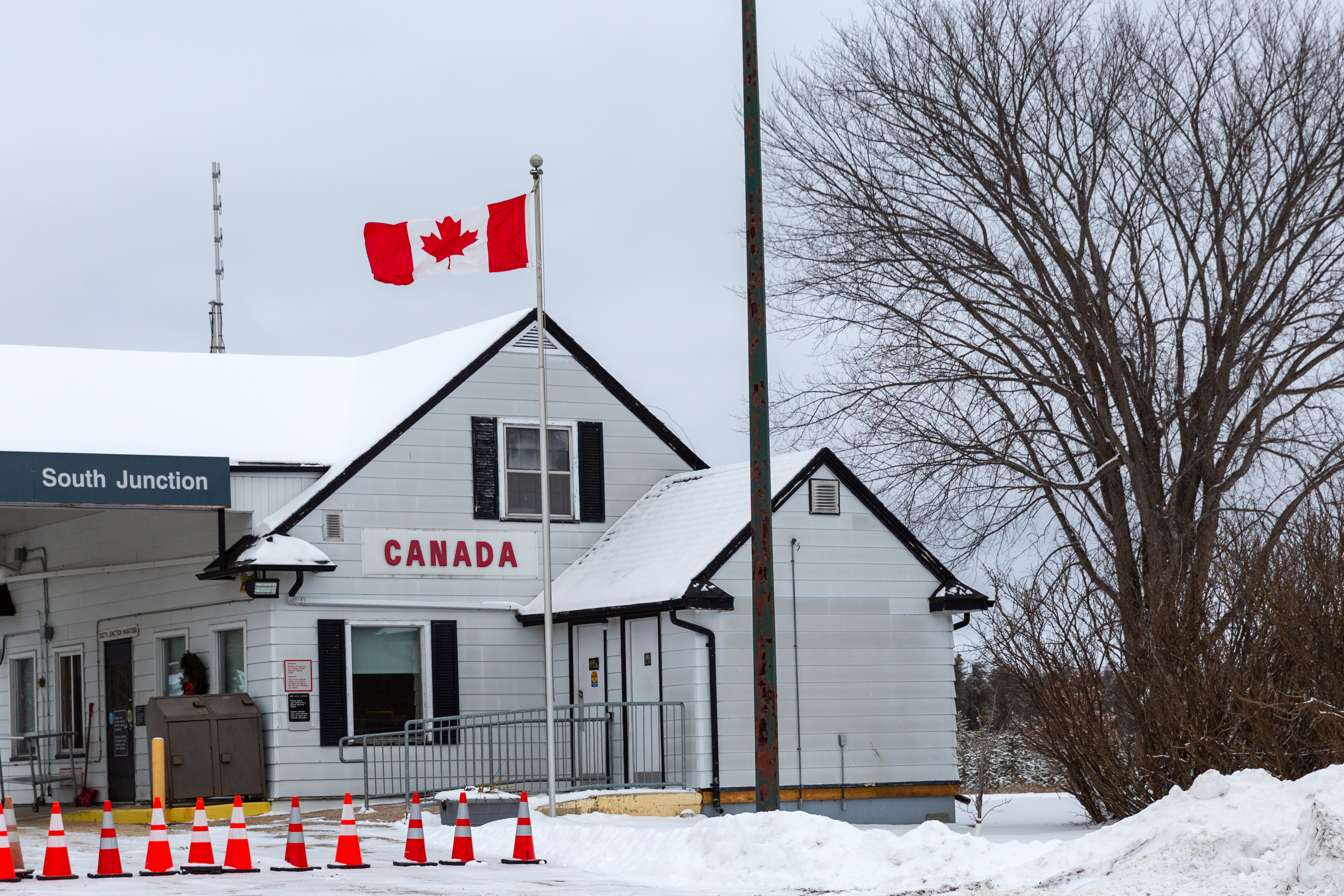
- Canadian Border Inspection Station at South Junction, MB

Locaiton
- Country: United States; Canada
- Location: MN 310 / PR 310; US Port: 41967 Minnesota State Highway 310, Roseau, MN 56751-8002; Canadian Port: Manitoba Provincial Road 310, South Junction, Manitoba R0A 2E0
- Coordinates: 48.999602°N 95.766420°W

Details
- Opened: 1948

The Roseau–South Junction Border Crossing connects the cities of Roseau, Minnesota, and South Junction, Manitoba, on the Canada–United States border. It is connected by Minnesota State Highway 310 in Roseau County on the American side and Manitoba Provincial Road 310 in the Rural Municipality of Piney on the Canadian side. The crossing was established in 1948.

Both border stations are open 8 am to 8 pm, though the Canadian side further restricts commercial traffic to before 5 pm.

The current Canadian border station, located about a half-mile north of the border, was completed in 1953. A 2022 assessment called for rebuilding this station, deemed to be beyond its lifecycle, on the same footprint with environmentally sustainable technologies. The US border station was rebuilt in 2004.

== See also ==
- List of Canada–United States border crossings
