= Point Roberts–Boundary Bay Border Crossing =

Border crossing between Canada and the United States

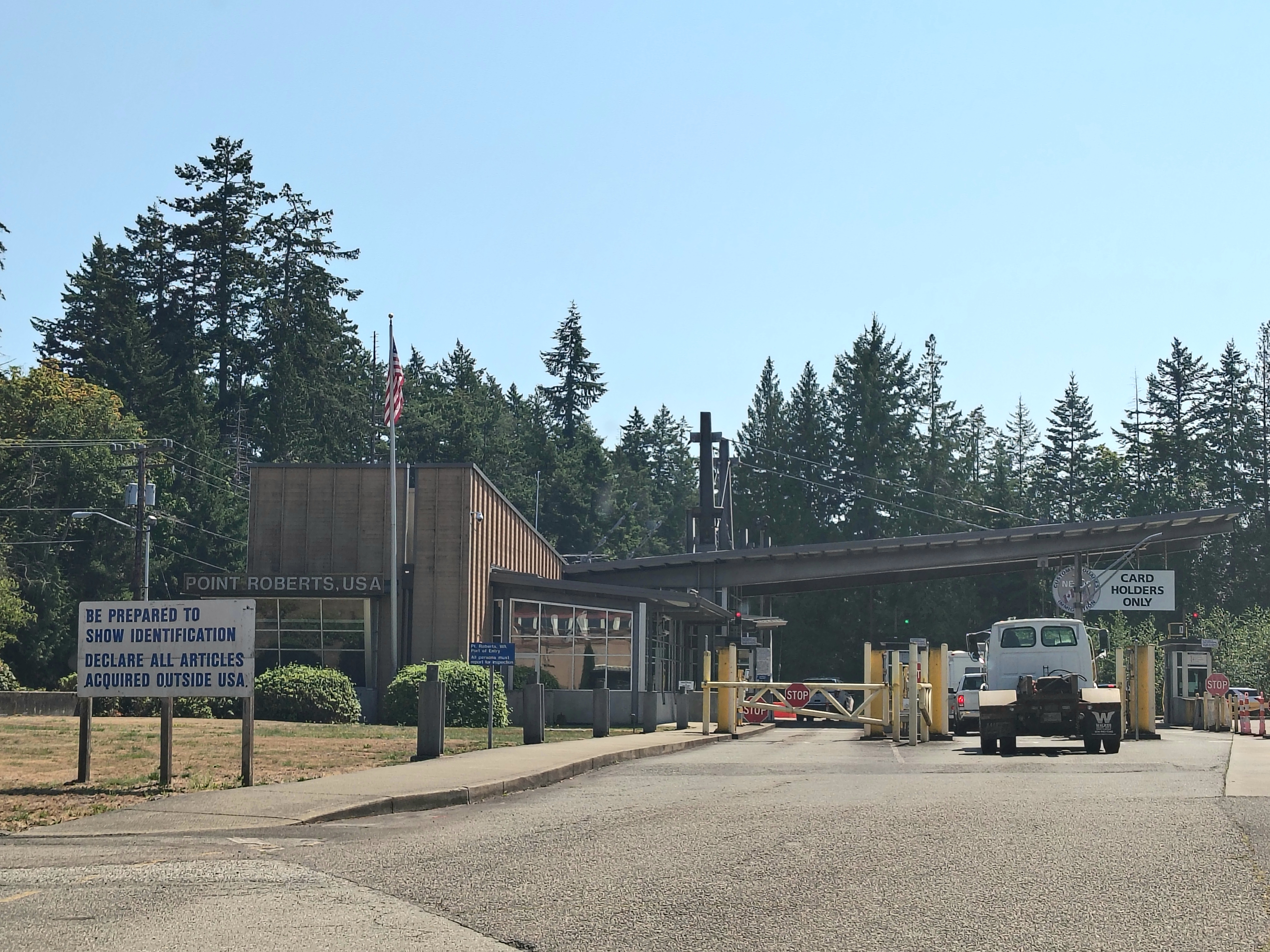
- United States port of entry, 2026

Location
- Country: United States; Canada
- Location: Tyee Drive / 56th Street; US Port: 50 Tyee Drive, Point Roberts, WA 98281; Canadian Port: 4 56th Street, Delta, BC V4L 1Z2
- Coordinates: 49°00′07″N 123°04′06″W

Details
- Opened: 1914

Website
- US Canadian

The Point Roberts–Boundary Bay Border Crossing connects the communities of Point Roberts, Washington, and Tsawwassen, British Columbia on the Canada–US border. Tyee Drive on the American side joins 56 Street on the Canadian side. The crossing is the westernmost in the contiguous United States. By land, Point Roberts can only be accessed via this crossing.

== Canadian side ==
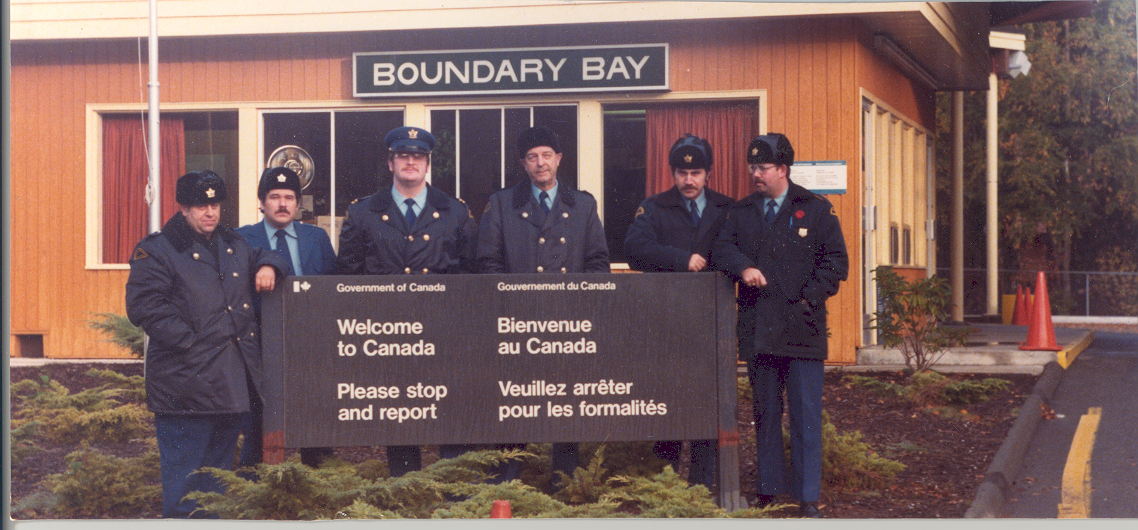
Canadian port of entry and border staff at Boundary Bay, 1979

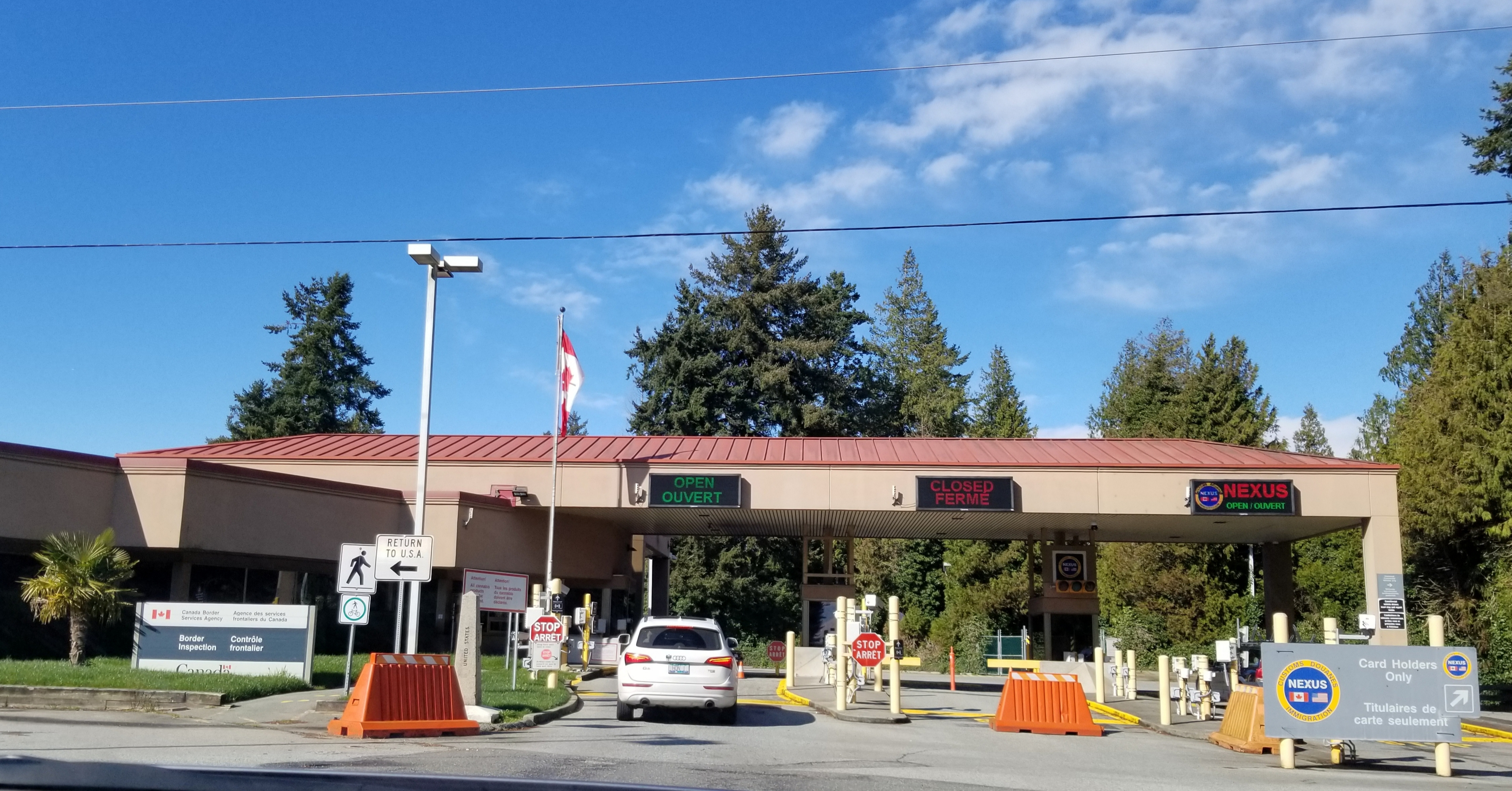
Canadian port of entry, 2026

Travel commonly occurred near or along the shores of Boundary Bay between the respective international boundaries. To address the customs implications of such journeys, a customs office was established at Boundary Bay in 1914. E.T. Calvert conducted the initial customs role from his home about 3 kilometres (2 mi) north of the boundary. His duties comprised patrolling the area by boat or on horseback.

In 1935, customs offices were built at the boundary on the main road and 2.2 kilometres (1.4 mi) eastward at Beach Road (67 Street). Having operated under the administrative oversight of the Port of New Westminster, the status was upgraded in 1948 to the Port of Boundary Bay.

In 1975, the Beach Road post closed permanently. The latest owner of this heritage building renovated the interior to accommodate a dental office. In 1977, the main crossing approach was widened from one to two lanes. In 2009, fugitive Ryan Alexander Jenkins walked across the porous border to enter BC. Commercial goods are transported by vehicle under custom's seals between the US mainland and Point Roberts. The CBSA office is open 24 hours.

== US side ==
In the early 1900s, customs officers rarely came to Point Roberts. From 1919, customs visits increased to two or three times a month. A canvas tent served as the temporary post. In 1934, a two-room wooden structure was built at the border and rented to customs. In 1936, Walter "Pa" Davis, was appointed the first Deputy Collector. In 1941, the building and the one-acre site were purchased. In 1968, a slightly larger building was erected.

Prior to closure in 1975, the US only staffed the small wooden structure at the eastward crossing of Meadow Lane intermittently.

In 1979, the main building was enlarged and two lanes added to the approach, one dedicated to trucks. By 1987, a new office added a lobby area and search room. The present facility, which opened in 1998, won a design award.

In 2020 and 2021, Point Roberts was significantly affected by a reduction in border crossings due to the COVID-19 pandemic.

Point Roberts was significantly affected by a reduction in border crossings by individuals residing on the Canadian side due to tariffs in the second Trump administration.

The crossing operates 24 hours.

== See also ==
- List of Canada–United States border crossings
