= Alberta Highway 62 =

Highway in Alberta, Canada

Highway 62

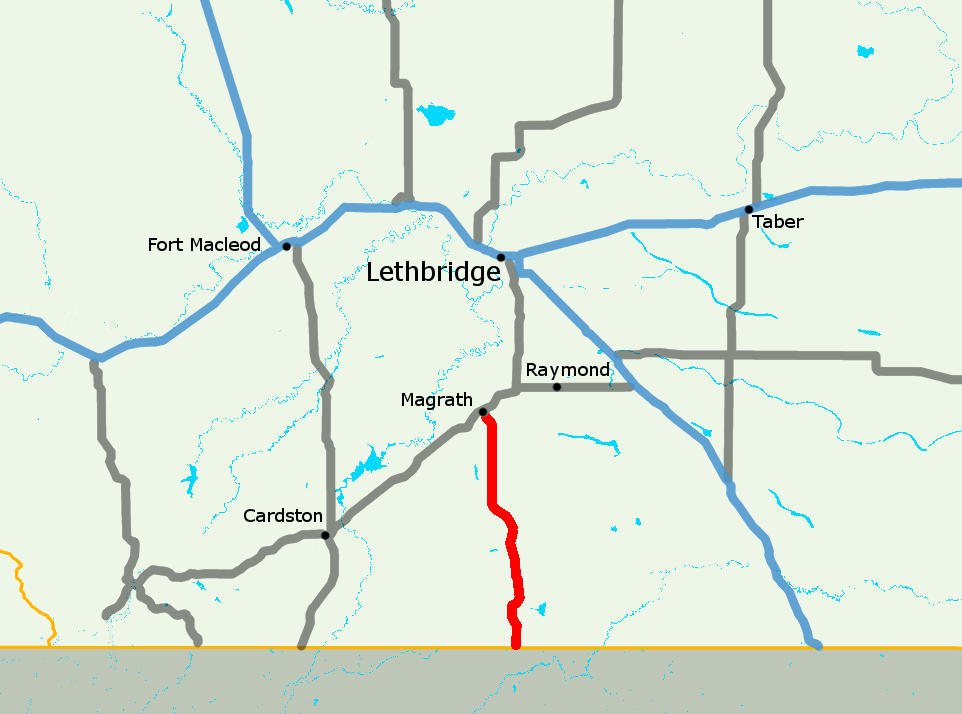
- Highway 62 highlighted in red

Route information
- Maintained by the Ministry of Transportation and Economic Corridors
- Length: 51.8 km (32.2 mi)

Major junctions
- South end: S-213 at the U.S. border near Del Bonita
- North end: Highway 5 in Magrath

Location
- Country: Canada
- Province: Alberta
- Specialized and rural municipalities: Cardston County
- Towns: Magrath

Highway system
- Alberta Provincial Highway Network; List; Former
← Highway 61	→ Highway 63

Highway 62 is a 52-kilometre (32 mi) north–south highway in southern Alberta, Canada that connects Highway 5 in Magrath to the Canada–United States border south of Del Bonita. It continues as Montana Secondary Highway 213 in the United States.

== Major intersections ==
From south to north. The entire route is in Cardston County.

Location	km	mi	Destinations	Notes
	0.0	0.0	S-213 south – Cut Bank	Continuation into Montana
	0.0	0.0	Canada–United States border at Del Bonita Border Crossing	
Del Bonita	3.3	2.1	Highway 501 – Cardston, Milk River	
	45.5	28.3	Highway 506 east	
Magrath	51.8	32.2	Highway 5 – Cardston, Waterton Park, Lethbridge	
1.000 mi = 1.609 km; 1.000 km = 0.621 mi: Route transition
