= Woodland Rail =

Overview
- Headquarters: Baileyville, Maine
- Locale: Maine, New Brunswick
- Dates of operation: 2012–

Technical
- Track gauge: 4 ft 8 1/2 in (1,435 mm) standard gauge

Woodland Rail, LLC is a non-carrier railroad company that owns an 11.83 mi (19.04 km) rail line located in the state of Maine and province of New Brunswick. It was formed in 2012 as a subsidiary company of Woodland Pulp, LLC, which owns and operates a pulp mill in the Woodland neighborhood of the town of Baileyville, Maine.

Woodland Rail connects a pulp mill in Baileyville, Maine with the Milltown Spur, owned by the New Brunswick Southern Railway (NBSR), at the midpoint of the Salmon Falls Railroad Bridge, which crosses the St. Croix River and the Canada–US border between Calais, Maine and St. Stephen, New Brunswick.

Woodland Rail has contracted Eastern Maine Railway to operate the line.

== History ==
In 2012 Woodland Rail, LLC was formed by its owner Woodland Pulp, LLC to purchase the Calais Industrial Track (former Calais Branch and Woodland Spur) from Pan Am Railways between Calais and Baileyville. This line was originally operated by the Maine Central Railroad (MEC) and later by Guilford Transportation Industries (GTI).

GTI had abandoned the Calais Branch west of Saint Croix Junction in 1985, leaving the remaining active rail line with a connection to Canadian Pacific Railway in St. Stephen, New Brunswick. The CP line to St. Stephen was sold to New Brunswick Southern Railway (NBSR) in 1995.

== Line description ==
Both ends of the line owned by Woodland Rail are located in the U.S.; the middle section measuring 5.08 mi (8.18 km) is located in Canada. The line runs in the St Croix River valley, crossing the Canada–US border at three locations.

Calais Branch

From its interchange with New Brunswick Southern Railway at the Salmon Falls Railroad Bridge in Calais, the line runs geographically southwest for approximately 2.5 mi (4.0 km) to St. Croix Junction. This portion was formerly part of the easternmost section of the Calais Branch.

Another 12.6 mi (20.3 km) of the former Calais Branch between St. Croix Junction and Ayers Junction remains in place (see rail banking) but is not in service. This track is currently owned by the Maine Department of Transportation in order to preserve the rail infrastructure should service be restored to the port of Eastport.

Woodland Spur

From St. Croix Junction, the line continues southwest up the St. Croix River valley as the Woodland Spur. 1.75 mi (2.82 km) at Baring, Maine, the line crosses from the south (west) bank of the St. Croix River to the north (east) bank at Upper Mills New Brunswick on the Baring Railroad Bridge.

The line then continues northwest for 5.08 mi (8.18 km) in New Brunswick to Mohannes, New Brunswick where it crosses back to the south (west) bank of the St. Croix River at Woodland Junction on the Sprague Falls Railroad Bridge.

At Woodland Junction, an industrial spur runs south for 1 mi (1.6 km) to serve the Woodland Pulp, LLC thermo-mechanical pulp mill in Baileyville. The Woodland Spur continues northwest for 1 mi (1.6 km) to the current end of track at an oriented strand board mill.

== See also ==
- United States Surface Transportation Board Docket No. FD 35628
- Canadian Transportation Agency Decision No. 245-R-2012
