= North Derby, Vermont =

- Unincorporated community
- Location within Vermont Location within the United States
- Coordinates: 45°00′20″N 72°10′16″W
- Country: United States
- State: Vermont
- County: Orleans
- Town: Derby
- Elevation: 725 ft (221 m)
- Time zone: UTC-5 (Eastern (EST))
  - Summer (DST): UTC-4 (EDT)
- ZIP Code: 05855 (Newport)
- Area code: 802
- GNIS feature ID: 1458724

North Derby is an unincorporated community in the town of Derby, Orleans County, Vermont, United States. It lies just south of the Canadian-American border.
