= New Brunswick Route 218 =

Highway in New Brunswick, Canada

Route 218

Route information
- Maintained by New Brunswick Department of Transportation
- Length: 1.5 km (0.93 mi)

Major junctions
- West end: Boundaryline Road at the U.S. border near Hamlin, ME
- East end: Route 2 (TCH) at Grand Falls

Location
- Country: Canada
- Province: New Brunswick
- Counties: Madawaska

Highway system
- Provincial highways in New Brunswick; Former routes
← Route 215	→ Route 255

Route 218 is a 1.5 km (0.93 mi) local highway in northwestern New Brunswick, Canada. It goes from the Canada–United States border in Hamlin, Maine to Route 2.

== Communities ==
- Hamlin, Maine
- Grand Falls, New Brunswick

== See also ==
- List of New Brunswick provincial highways
