= Hamlin, Maine =

Town in Maine, United States

- Town
- Location of Hamlin, Maine
- Coordinates: 47°06′12″N 67°52′32″W
- Country: United States
- State: Maine
- County: Aroostook

Area
  - Total: 24.04 sq mi (62.26 km^{2})
  - Land: 23.35 sq mi (60.48 km^{2})
  - Water: 0.69 sq mi (1.79 km^{2})
- Elevation: 709 ft (216 m)

Population (2020)
  - Total: 166
  - Density: 7.0/sq mi (2.7/km^{2})
- Time zone: UTC-5 (Eastern (EST))
  - Summer (DST): UTC-4 (EDT)
- Area code: 207
- FIPS code: 23-30690
- GNIS feature ID: 582506

Hamlin is a town in Aroostook County, Maine, United States. It is located on the border between the U.S. and Canada with a border crossing into the Canadian town of Grand Falls, New Brunswick. The population was 166 at the 2020 census.

Hamlin is noted for being the closest continental location in the U.S. to Europe; the town's northeastern corner is situated at a distance of 2,508 miles (4,018 km) from Achill Head in Ireland, making it the closest point in the mainland U.S. to Western Europe.

== History ==
Hamlin was named for Vice President Hannibal Hamlin.

== Education ==
Hamlin is a member of Maine School Administrative District No. 24, which includes the Van Buren District School, a consolidated K–12 school located in Van Buren.

== Demographics ==
Historical population
Census	Pop.	Note	%±
1870	558		—
1880	612		9.7%
1890	484		−20.9%
1900	574		18.6%
1910	657		14.5%
1920	602		−8.4%
1930	486		−19.3%
1940	638		31.3%
1950	430		−32.6%
1960	374		−13.0%
1970	357		−4.5%
1980	340		−4.8%
1990	204		−40.0%
2000	257		26.0%
2010	219		−14.8%
2020	166		−24.2%
U.S. Decennial Census

=== 2010 census ===
As of the census of 2010, there were 219 people, 96 households, and 68 families living in the town. The population density was 9.4 inhabitants per square mile (3.6/km^{2}). There were 124 housing units at an average density of 5.3 per square mile (2.0/km^{2}). The racial makeup of the town was 94.1% White, 0.5% Native American, 3.2% Asian, and 2.3% from two or more races.

There were 96 households, of which 16.7% had children under the age of 18 living with them, 60.4% were married couples living together, 5.2% had a female householder with no husband present, 5.2% had a male householder with no wife present, and 29.2% were non-families. 24.0% of all households were made up of individuals, and 13.6% had someone living alone who was 65 years of age or older. The average household size was 2.19 and the average family size was 2.53.

The median age in the town was 54.8 years. 15.5% of residents were under the age of 18; 4.5% were between the ages of 18 and 24; 15% were from 25 to 44; 32.4% were from 45 to 64; and 32.4% were 65 years of age or older. The gender makeup of the town was 48.9% male and 51.1% female.

=== 2000 census ===
Languages (2000)	Percent
Spoke French at home	55.56%
Spoke English at home	44.44%

As of the census of 2000, there were 257 people, 103 households, and 73 families living in the town. The population density was 11.0 inhabitants per square mile (4.2/km^{2}). There were 122 housing units at an average density of 5.2 per square mile (2.0/km^{2}). The racial makeup of the town was 96.11% White, 1.95% Native American, 0.39% Asian, and 1.56% from two or more races.

There were 103 households, out of which 23.3% had children under the age of 18 living with them, 65.0% were married couples living together, 3.9% had a female householder with no husband present, and 28.2% were non-families. 23.3% of all households were made up of individuals, and 7.8% had someone living alone who was 65 years of age or older. The average household size was 2.43 and the average family size was 2.88.

In the town, the population was spread out, with 20.6% under the age of 18, 5.4% from 18 to 24, 26.5% from 25 to 44, 32.3% from 45 to 64, and 15.2% who were 65 years of age or older. The median age was 44 years. For every 100 females, there were 102.4 males. For every 100 females age 18 and over, there were 94.3 males.

The median income for a household in the town was $32,625, and the median income for a family was $34,125. Males had a median income of $33,125 versus $14,688 for females. The per capita income for the town was $13,600. About 9.9% of families and 10.0% of the population were below the poverty line, including 15.1% of those under the age of eighteen and 20.0% of those 65 or over.
