= South Junction, Manitoba =

Community in Manitoba, Canada

Coordinates: 49°02′26″N 95°45′56″W

- Interactive map of South Junction, Manitoba
- Province: Manitoba

South Junction is a community in southeastern Manitoba in the Rural Municipality of Piney. It is approximately 160 kilometres (99 mi) southeast of Winnipeg near the Canada–United States border. The Roseau–South Junction Border Crossing is located south of the community.

== History ==
South Junction originated in the 1900s, named for it being the junction of two railways which connected Western Canada and the United States. It also connected the community of Sprague to the border crossing in Emerson. Historically, the community focused on agriculture and forestry.

== Education ==
The South Junction School District was created in March 1912, began operations in a one-room schoolhouse. The school was relocated two times, in 1929 and 1952. In 1967, the South Junction School District was dissolved, and it became a part of the Sprague Consolidated School District.
