= East Richford, Vermont =

- Unincorporated community
- Location within Vermont
- Coordinates: 45°00′40″N 72°35′09″W
- Country: United States
- State: Vermont
- County: Franklin
- Elevation: 509 ft (155 m)
- Time zone: UTC-5 (Eastern (EST))
  - Summer (DST): UTC-4 (EDT)
- ZIP Code: 05476 (Richford)
- Area code: 802
- GNIS feature ID: 1457315

East Richford is an unincorporated community in the town of Richford, Franklin County, Vermont, United States.
