= Orchestral percussion =

Musical instruments

Orchestral percussion refers to the various percussion instruments used in an orchestral setting. It may also refer to the act of playing such instruments in an orchestral style. Many music schools and conservatories offer training for musicians interested in developing their skills as orchestral percussionists. Typically, an orchestral percussionist does not specialize in one particular instrument. Although there is no exhaustive list of all instruments that an orchestral percussionist must be able to play, there are particular instruments that are frequently used in the orchestral repertoire. This includes timpani, snare drum, bass drum, xylophone, glockenspiel, triangle, cymbals, and tambourine.

== Mallet instruments ==
Mallet percussion (also known as a keyboard or tuned percussion) is the general name given to the mallet-struck, idiophonic percussion family of instruments. This includes many examples but among the most commonly used are marimba, vibraphone, xylophone, and glockenspiel.

There are common excerpts for most of the mallet instruments. Gershwin's Porgy and Bess remains the most requested xylophone excerpt at auditions, with Copland's Appalachian Spring, Kodály's Háry János Suite, and Kabalevsky's Colas Breugnon being other common choices, among many others.

The glockenspiel is also used in the orchestra and has had parts written for it. Dukas's The Sorcerer's Apprentice as well as Respighi's Pini di Roma are common audition excerpts.

Another idiophonic instrument used in the orchestra, as well as jazz, is the vibraphone. The most commonly requested excerpt for vibraphone at orchestral auditions is from Leonard Bernstein's "West Side Story." The "Little Blue Devil" movement from "Seven Studies on Themes of Paul Klee" by Gunther Schuller is also frequently requested.

== Drums ==
=== Bass drum ===
In an orchestral setting, the concert bass drum contributes to the overall sound of the ensemble. In orchestral literature, the bass drum usually deals more with coloring and shading the sounds of the orchestra as opposed to providing a solid, rhythmic foundation like in marching band drumset. The bass drum is usually used to accent strong points in the music and is often combined with a cymbal crash to further accentuate the moment. In fact, the two instruments are used in conjunction so often that many parts simply contain one rhythm and the composer then indicates which instruments are to play at which points.

Though the bass drum is possibly the least frequently requested instrument at auditions, the number of variables involved (beater choice, beating location, muffling, stroke type) requires the player to manage a range of sounds from the instrument.

Some important excerpts for the bass drum in orchestral literature include Stravinsky's The Rite of Spring, Tchaikovsky's Symphony No. 4, Romeo and Juliet, and 1812 Overture, many of the Mahler symphonies (most notably his third), and Symphonie Fantastique by Hector Berlioz.

=== Snare drum ===
The snare drum, also called the side drum, is often used as a means of accenting rhythms from other families of instruments within the orchestra or as a soloistic type, particularly in pieces that may have a "military" type theme or sound to them.

The snare drum works extremely well as an accentuating instrument. Tuned and played correctly, it can produce sounds ranging from quick, short, and snappy to thick, warm, whip-crack-like accents. There are numerous examples in music of the snare drum being used in this fashion. One such example would be the fourth movement of Nikolai Rimsky-Korsakov's symphonic suite Scheherazade. In this particular example, the snare drum is used to accentuate the various crescendos and "hits" played by the rest of the orchestra. It is also used to reinforce the rhythms played by the trumpets throughout the movement.

The snare drum is also used as a solo instrument in classical music. An example of this use is the opening of Sergei Prokofiev's Lieutenant Kijé suite. After an opening trumpet solo, the snare drum plays a rather short, military-style solo at a pianissimo dynamic marking, designed to create a march-like feel. This particular part presents a number of problems for the orchestral percussionist, but its main difficulty lies in keeping the various rudiments (flams, four-stroke ruffs, etc.) consistent at such a soft dynamic level.

Another difficult Snare Drum piece in classical music is:

Bolero (somewhat demanding due to the exposed nature, the same two measures repeated for about 15 minutes, driving the entire orchestra to the end).

Traditional rudimental solos that show a snare drummers technique include:

The Connecticut Halftime, The Three Camps, and The Downfall of Paris

There has been a marked deviation from high-sticking, traditional drumming to a forced low-stick style. Various techniques of the snare drum include the Moller method, the Gladstone method, and other methods.

=== Concert toms ===
Much like the bass drum, the concert toms are meant to add color and shading to orchestral music. However, it can also be used much like the snare drum. In fact, the snare drum can have the snare off, producing a high tom sound. Depending on the composer and/or music, the concert tom can be used as both. It gives a warm but sharper tone due to its size, being between 8 and 16 inches in diameter, whereas the concert bass is 30 to 45 inches. Factors such as the feel of the piece and the time period in which it was written are taken into account when using the concert tom.

== Auxiliary percussion ==
Auxiliary percussion (also known as battery percussion or accessory percussion) include instruments like the triangle, castanets, and tambourine. These instruments are often overlooked and treated as trivial or unimportant simply because, to the untrained eye (or ear), they seem easy to play. The truth is, however, that auxiliary percussion often requires the most use of extended techniques and that the parts for these instruments are frequently the most difficult. Other auxiliary percussion instruments include:

- Anvil
- Bongos
- China cymbal
- Claves
- Congas
- Cowbell
- Crash cymbal
- Djembe
- Finger cymbals
- Güiro
- Hi-hat
- Maracas
- Mark tree
- Rainstick
- Ratchet
- Ride cymbal
- Rototom
- Shaker
- Suspended cymbal
- Temple blocks
- Tom drums
- Vibraslap
- Wind chimes
- Wood block
- Flexatone

== Cymbals and gongs ==
- Crash cymbals (also known as clash cymbals)

Crash cymbals have been used in an orchestral setting since the time of Mozart when he adopted their sound from traditional Turkish bands to be used in his opera Abduction from the Seraglio. Since then, crash cymbals have become one of the most written for percussion instruments in classical music .

- Gong/tam tam
- Suspended cymbal

Gongs and tam-tams are easily confused with one another. A gong, generally, is a large hung cymbal with a nipple. As such, they are usually known as nipple gongs. This nipple is a small dome in the centre of the cymbal that produces a single note when struck with a soft beater. Conversely, a tam-tam has no nipple and a flat central area. When this cymbal is struck with a beater (most usually a soft beater), it produces a myriad of sounds with no single overruling note.

One can distinguish the two by ear by following a simple method. A gong sounds like a slightly muffled church bell, producing a soft but clear note, whereas the tam-tam sounds much more like a large metal object being struck by a hard material.

== Examination ==
Associated Board of the Royal Schools of Music, Trinity College London and London College of Music provide examination for orchestral percussion player. Candidates perform a balanced programme of three pieces, one chosen from mallet percussion song list, one from snare drum song list and one from timpani song list.
