= Cymbal choke =

Type of drum stroke

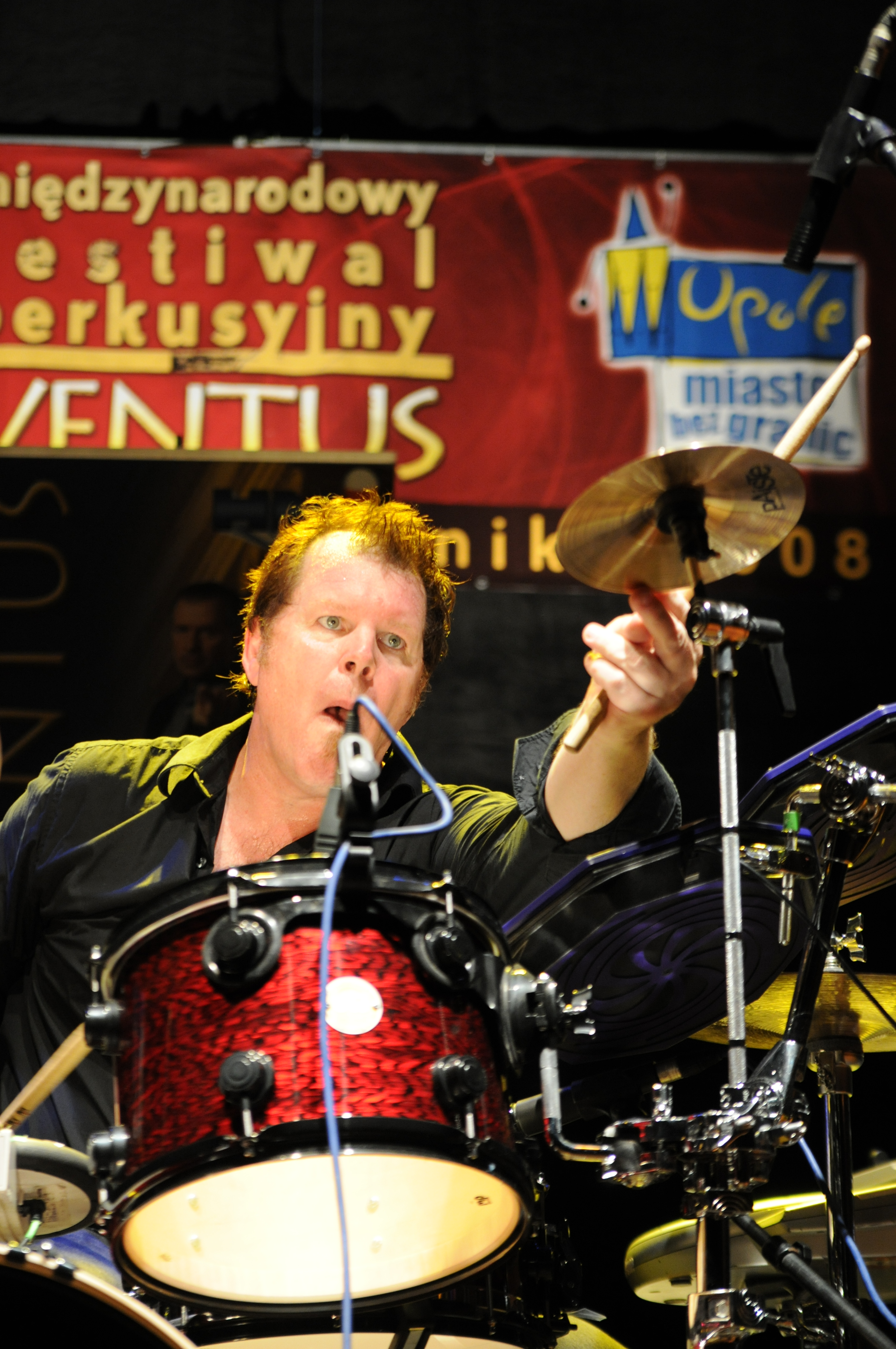
A drummer choking a splash cymbal

In percussion, cymbal choke is a drum stroke or push which consists of striking a cymbal with a drum stick held in one hand and then immediately grabbing the cymbal with another hand, or more rarely, with the same hand. The cymbal choke produces a burst of sound which is abruptly silenced, which can be used for punctuation or dramatic fortissimo effects. In some modern music, namely heavy metal, it is "often employed to emphasize a particular beat or signal an abrupt conclusion to a passage." Cymbal chokes are used extensively by classical percussionists to muffle the sound of a cymbal in accordance with the composer's notation, or in an attempt to match the sustain of other instruments in the ensemble. "The effect, a sudden burst of sound, is [often] further strengthened by a single, simultaneous kick with the bass drum."

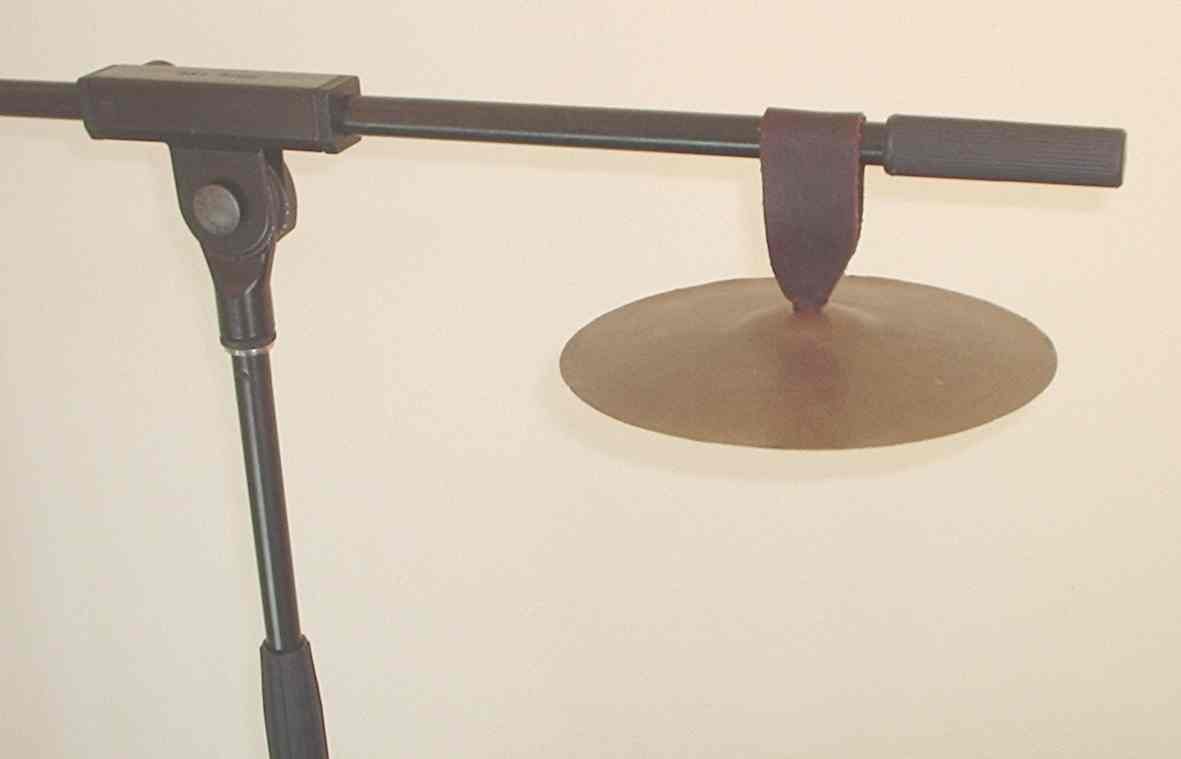
Suspended cymbal

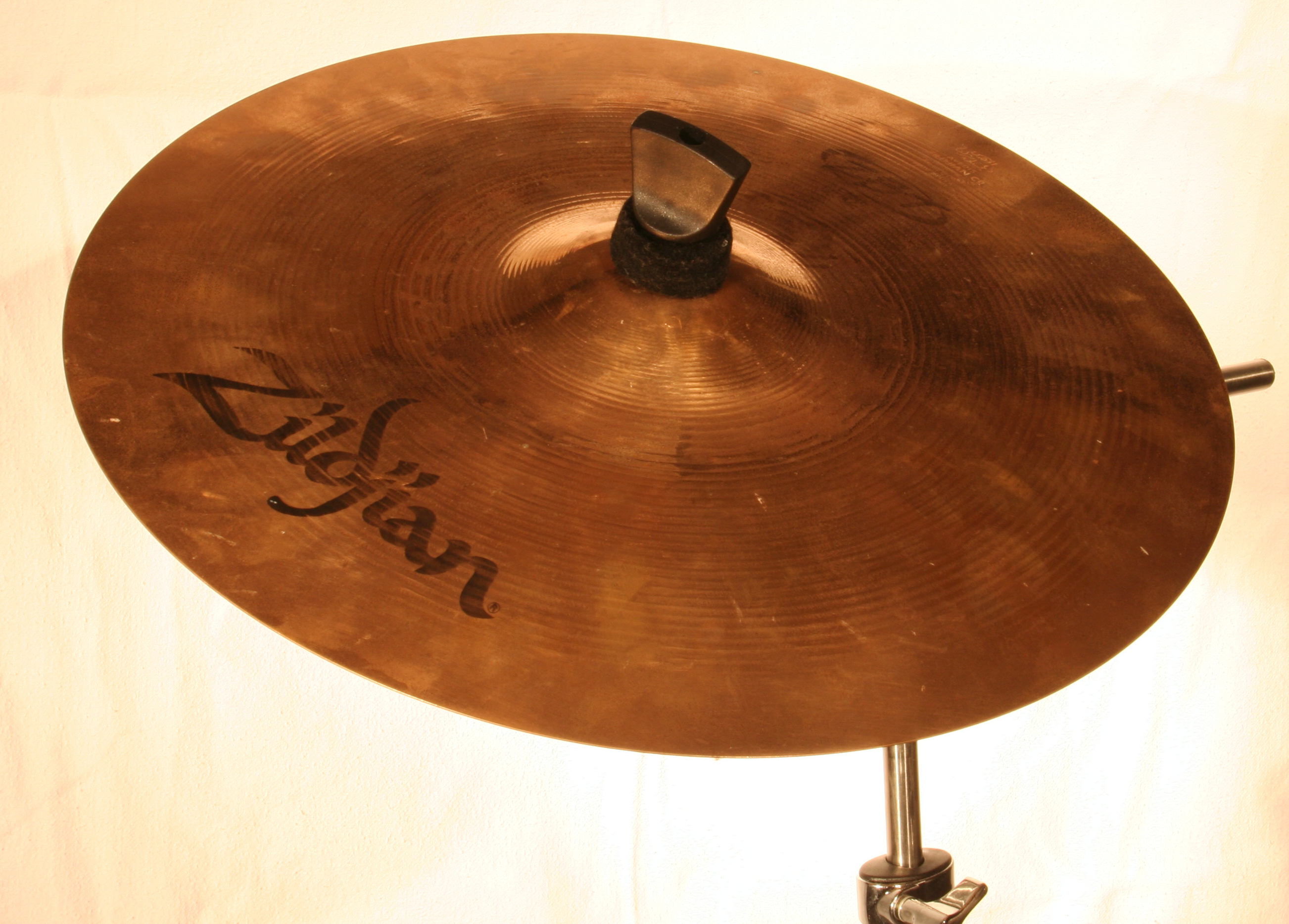
Crash cymbal

For 'choke' cymbal, strike the suspended cymbal with the tip of a wood stick and dampen the sound immediately after the duration of the note.

[In] ragtime [1890-1920]...a lot of time there would be a crash cymbal, or a choke cymbal as they called it, that was usually played with a mallet. They would strike the cymbal with one hand and choke it with the other hand. And there were different techniques for choking the cymbals. Sometimes, they would really cut the cymbal and make it real staccato...Or they would play other styles where they would let the cymbal ring a little bit and sustain itself, and then catch it.

Choke cymbal was common in the early jazz drumset (1900-1930). "In early jazz...A drummer would accent key moments in the music by striking the cymbal for a dramatic crash, then choking it with his [or her] hand. The abrupt sound made an exclamation point." The hi-hat eighth notes only stop in "Good Times Bad Times" (1969), "during measures where a cymbal choke occurs (and the band rests)."

In modern music, cymbal chokes were used extensively by drummer Roger Taylor and can be heard in many Queen songs including "The Loser in the End" (1974) and "The Prophet's Song" (1975). It can also be heard at the start "Eye of the Tiger" by Survivor and of the Metallica song "Master of Puppets", throughout most of "The Happiest Days of Our Lives" by Pink Floyd, and during the choruses of "She Will" by Savages from their debut album Silence Yourself.

== See also ==
- Damping (music)
- Ghost note
