= Paiste =

Percussion instruments manufacturer

Paiste AG
- Type: Private (Aktiengesellschaft/AG)
- Industry: Musical instruments
- Founded: 1906; 120 years ago in Saint Petersburg, Russian Empire
- Headquarters: Nottwil (canton of Lucerne), Switzerland
- Number of locations: 5
- Key people: Erik Paiste, CEO and president of the supervisory board
- Products: Cymbals, gongs, crotales, cowbells
- Subsidiaries: Schacht-Audorf (German subsidiary); Paiste America (since 1981); Spain and Estonia (both 1995)
- Website: paiste.com

Paiste (English pronunciation: /ˈpaɪsti/ PY-stee, Estonian pronunciation: [ˈpɑiste]) is a Swiss musical instrument manufacturing company. It is the world's third largest manufacturer of cymbals, gongs, and metal percussion. Paiste is an Estonian and Finnish word that means "shine".

Apart from cymbals and gongs, Paiste has also manufactured other percussion instruments, including crotal bells, finger cymbals, and cowbells, which were later discontinued.

== History ==
The first Paiste cymbals were produced in 1906 by Estonian musician Toomas Paiste in his instrument repair shop in Saint Petersburg, Russian Empire. Toomas had served in the Russian Imperial Guard and retired in 1901 to open a music shop and publishing business.

The cymbal-making aspect of the business expanded with the passing years, despite the disruption of several moves necessitated by war. The company opened a factory in Tallinn, Estonia, in 1917, where Toomas' son Michail M. Paiste decided to concentrate on cymbal production and export. In 1940, after the annexation of Estonia by the USSR, the family and the cymbal-making operation moved to Poland, where they continued under extremely difficult conditions, and in 1945 to Germany. Finally, in 1957, a new headquarters and production facility was established in Switzerland. The business was continued by Michail's sons, Robert and Toomas (born Kurt), with both the Swiss and German operations as the main manufacturing centres. Since 2003, the company has been headed by Toomas' son, Erik. Robert Paiste died in 2016, aged 84.

== Innovations ==
Paiste has developed several innovations to cymbal design and manufacture. Among these are:

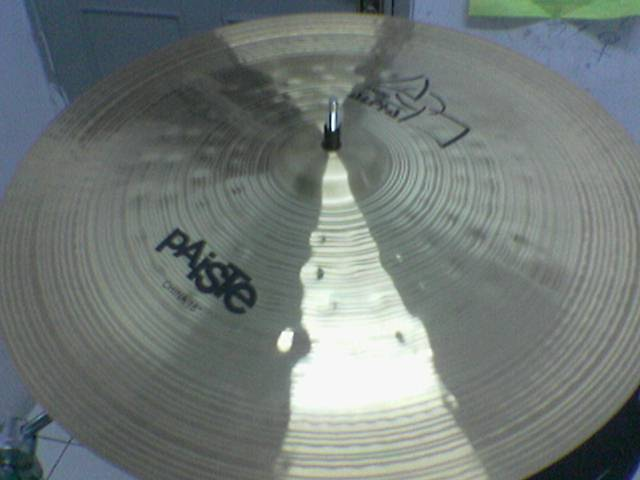
A Paiste Alpha China cymbal

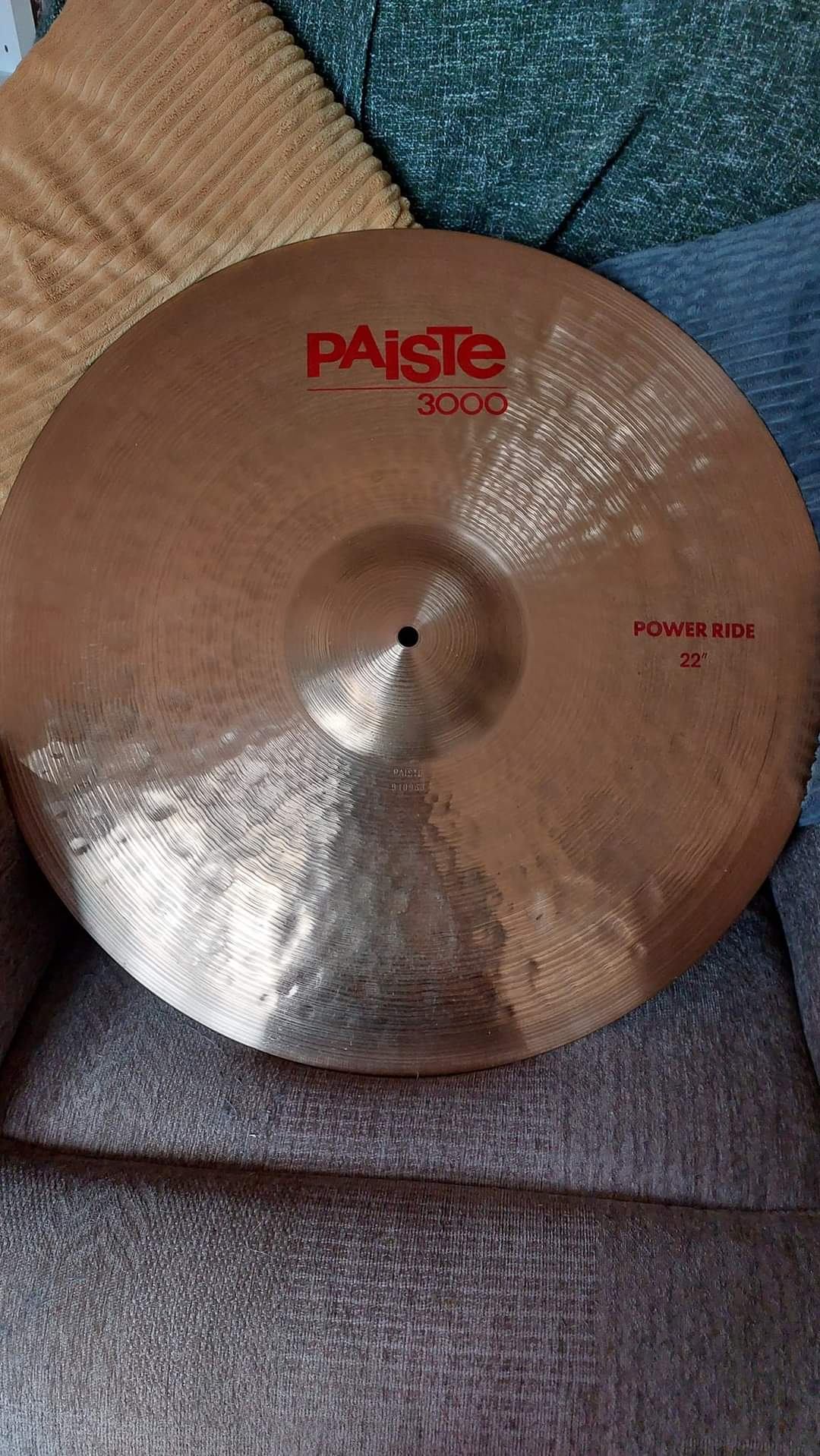
Discontinued 1989 Paiste 3000 22" Power Ride

- The Flat Ride: A ride cymbal without a cup or bell. Originally designated as Space Sound in the Formula 602 line. Designed with Joe Morello. Introduced in the 1960s.
- The splash cymbal: Widely used for jazz music in the 1920s and 30s, the traditional splash cymbal was not seen for many years in mainstream music until The Police’s drummer Stewart Copeland brought it back to prominence in the early 80s. Thanks to a toy cymbal he found in a trip in Asia and which he brought to Paiste, heavier splash cymbals, more suited for harder styles of drumming, were soon available and started being heavily commercialized. Then alongside Manu Katché spread the use of this type of cymbal.
- The Sound Edge Hi-Hat: Introduced in 1967. To prevent airlock, the bottom cymbal of the hi-hat pair has ripples along the edge. Also applied to hand cymbal sets.
- The use of B8 bronze as a cymbal alloy: Referred to by Paiste as "CuSn8" alloy or "2002 bronze". First introduced with the Stambul 65 series in 1965. Gained general acceptance with the Giant Beat and the 2002 series. Paiste was for a time the only major cymbal company to use the B8 alloy for its high-end lines, although Meinl has recently introduced a line of high-end cast B8 bronze cymbals as well. Zildjian and Sabian use this alloy primarily for entry-level lines, choosing instead to use bell bronze for high-end products.
- 'Flat' bells: With the introduction of the Sound Creation Short Crash in late 1977, Paiste was the first to make use of a flattened bell design. Used today with the Crystal Hi-Hats and Crashes of the Signature series.
- Unlathed cymbals: Introduced in 1980 as the RUDE series. Made from the B8 alloy, unlathed cymbals were marketed towards louder music styles as punk and heavy metal.
- Inverted bell on China cymbal: Introduced in 1983 as the 2002 NOVO china type. Makes it easier to play ride and crash on a China cymbal.
- Coloured cymbals: Introduced in 1984.
- Proprietary Signature Bronze: A patented cymbal alloy introduced in 1989, with the Signature line. According to the patent, this alloy consists of phosphor bronze with a 14.7% to 15.1% tin content by weight. It has been claimed by Paiste to be the first bronze alloy specifically developed for cymbals.
- Sonic Texture Formula: Introduced in 2001 with the Innovations series. A patented lathing technique to get a more complex sounding cymbal.

Many of these innovations were used by other manufacturers when the applicable patents expired. For example, almost all the larger modern cymbal companies offer a flat ride cymbal and an alternative to the Sound Edge Hi-Hat.

== Notable artists ==
- Bill Bruford of Yes/King Crimson/Earthworks
- Josh Freese of Nine Inch Nails
- Josh Devine of One Direction
- Nicko McBrain of Iron Maiden
- John Bonham of Led Zeppelin
- Stewart Copeland of The Police
- Larry Mullen Jr. of U2
- Charlie Benante of Anthrax
- Kyle Spence of Harvey Milk
- Dave Lombardo of Testament/Suicidal Tendencies/Slayer
- Phil Rudd of AC/DC
- Abe Laboriel Jr. of Paul McCartney
- Tommy Aldridge of Whitesnake
- Joey Jordison of Slipknot
- Ian Paice of Deep Purple
- Paul Bostaph of Slayer
- Jack Lawless of Jonas Brothers/DNCE
- Tico Torres of Bon Jovi
- Mikkey Dee of Scorpions
- Danny Carey of Tool
- Nick Mason of Pink Floyd
- Alex Van Halen of Van Halen
- Scott Travis of Judas Priest
- Chad Smith of Red Hot Chili Peppers
- Frank Beard of ZZ Top
- Simon Kirke of Bad Company
- Bruce Gary of The Knack
- Jeff Porcaro of Toto
- Carl Palmer of Emerson, Lake and Palmer
- Matt Flynn of Maroon 5
- Daniel Wagner of Greta Van Fleet
- Thomas Götz of Beatsteaks
- Eloy Casagrande of Slipknot
- John Dolmayan of System of a Down
- Inferno of Behemoth
- Brad Wilk of Rage Against the Machine
- Pierre Favre
- Jake Cochran of Illiterate Light
- Gonzo Sandoval of Armored Saint
- Bobby Chouinard of Billy Squier
- Scott Rockenfield of Queensryche
- Aquiles Priester of Hangar
- Alex González of Maná
- Leon "Ndugu" Chancler of Weather Report
- Cozy Powell of Whitesnake
- Narada Michael Walden
- Don Henley of the Eagles
- Meg White of the White Stripes

== Patents ==
- U.S. patent 4,809,581
