= Flat ride cymbal =

Type of ride cymbal

A flat ride cymbal or flat top ride (or often just flat ride) is a ride cymbal without a bell, originally developed by Paiste in collaboration with jazz drummer Joe Morello as part of their Formula 602 series in 1967. The most common size is 20" followed by 18", but larger examples exist: Paiste Formula 602 flatride

A flat ride cymbal produces the tightest, driest, most controlled stick sound of all ride cymbals, but with an airy wash. The lack of bell makes this cymbal quieter and most suitable for jazz. Roy Haynes was one of the first drummers to use a flat ride which can be heard on Chick Corea's album Now He Sings, Now He Sobs made in 1968. Charlie Watts of The Rolling Stones also used a flat ride extensively.

== Examples ==
- Paiste 20" Formula 602 Medium Flatride
- Meinl Byzance 20" Jazz Flat Ride
- Zildjian 20" K Light Flat Ride
- Zildjian 20" K Custom Flat Top Ride
