= Crash cymbal =

Unpitched percussion instrument

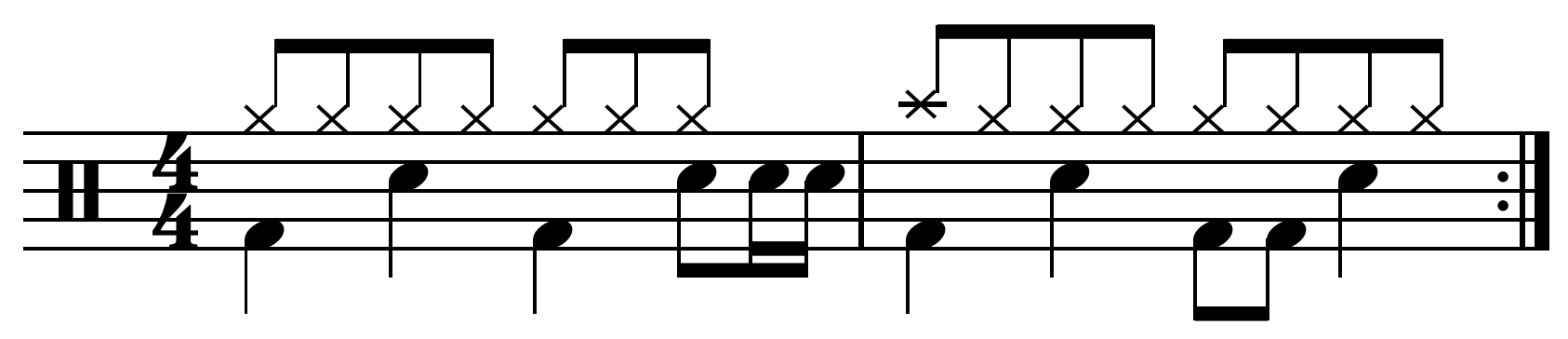
In rock and popular drumming styles the crash cymbal frequently follows a fill, replacing the first note of the next measure and accompanying the bass drum.

A crash cymbal is a type of cymbal that produces a loud, sharp "crash" and is used mainly for occasional accents, as opposed to a ride cymbal. It can be mounted on a stand and played with a drum stick, or by hand in pairs. One or two crash cymbals are a standard part of a drum kit. Suspended crash cymbals are also used in bands and orchestras, either played with a drumstick or rolled with a pair of mallets to produce a slower, swelling crash. Sometimes a drummer may hit two different crash cymbals in a kit at the same time to produce a very loud accent, usually in rock music.

The sound of a crash cymbal.

Although crash cymbals range in thickness from paper-thin to very heavy, all crash cymbals have a fairly thin edge. They are typically 14 to 18 inches (36 to 46 cm) in diameter, but sizes down to 8 inches (20 cm) and up to 24 inches (61 cm) are manufactured. Custom crash cymbals up to 28 inches (71 cm) in diameter have been used by big bands. Different thicknesses are used for different kinds of music, and the alloy for each manufacturer's models varies. A thick cymbal is likely to be used by a metal or rock band, while thinner cymbals are generally used in lighter rock. Darker crashes are best used for jazz.

The sound of a crash is changed by its luster. A cleaner cymbal creates a crisper sound, whereas a cymbal showing signs of oxidation (called a 'raw' cymbal) creates a duller sound.

== Position ==
Crash cymbals were traditionally placed on the left side of the drum set (for a right-handed drummer) since the normally larger ride cymbal is usually on the right, however some drummers set up their crash on the right. Often a drummer will have multiple crashes, and so may set them up with one or two on each side or, less commonly, one mounted very closely above another, usually larger crash or ride.

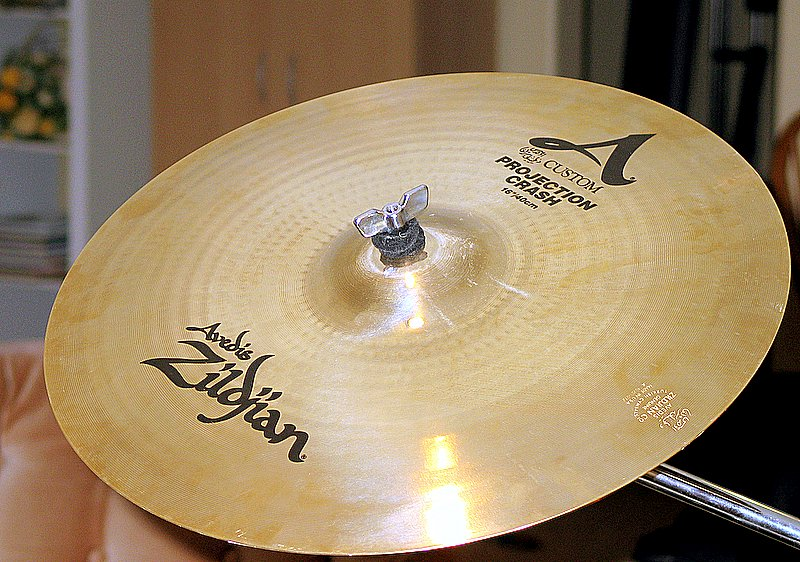
A 16" Zildjian A Custom Projection Crash.

An 18" Sabian AAX X-plosion Crash.

== Cracking ==
Crash cymbals are often the first ones in a drum set to warp and ultimately crack, due to repeated striking of the edge. Cracking is generally in the form of a fracture along the edge, or across the bow, often originating from the edge. Cracks are caused by poor technique or excessive playing or more rarely as a result of a defect originating from manufacture or damage to the cymbal not caused by playing, for example dropping. If a crack is left untreated, it will begin to follow the lathe grooves around the cymbal and could potentially spread all the way around and back to the point where it started, causing the outer portion of a cymbal to simply drop off. Often, lower quality sheet cymbals are more likely to crack, due to stress caused in some areas by pressing sheet metal. Thicker cymbals are also more likely to crack due to their brittleness and less freedom to vibrate. Cymbal manufacturers suggest that wear on the cymbal can be reduced by playing with glancing blows, angled to the side and slightly away from the vertical, about a quarter of the way between the edge and the center and allowing the drum stick to bounce off naturally, rather than forcing the stick down at the cymbal head-on. This allows the cymbal to vibrate freely and for little stress to be caused on the edge or at the center hole, thus reducing the chance of a crack. Cracked cymbals are often fixed either temporarily or permanently by drilling a hole at either end of the crack (often the crack will spread further than it appears to the naked eye, so this method is often not as effective) or removing the cracked portion or cutting the cymbal's edge down, although this method can drastically alter a cymbal's sound. Both of these methods are often ineffective at stopping cracks, but usually slow the spread of a crack down.

== Orchestral crash cymbals ==
A matching pair of crash cymbals played by striking the two together are known as clash cymbals. Clash cymbals are part of a standard orchestral percussion section. Two tones are normally used by major orchestras, known as Germanic or Wagnerian (heavier) and Viennese (lighter); a third, rarer tone is known as French (lighter still). Crash cymbals are also used in marching bands and wind ensembles.

== See also ==
- Choke cymbal
