= Taal (instrument) =

Cymbal originated from the Indian subcontinent

Taal or Manjira
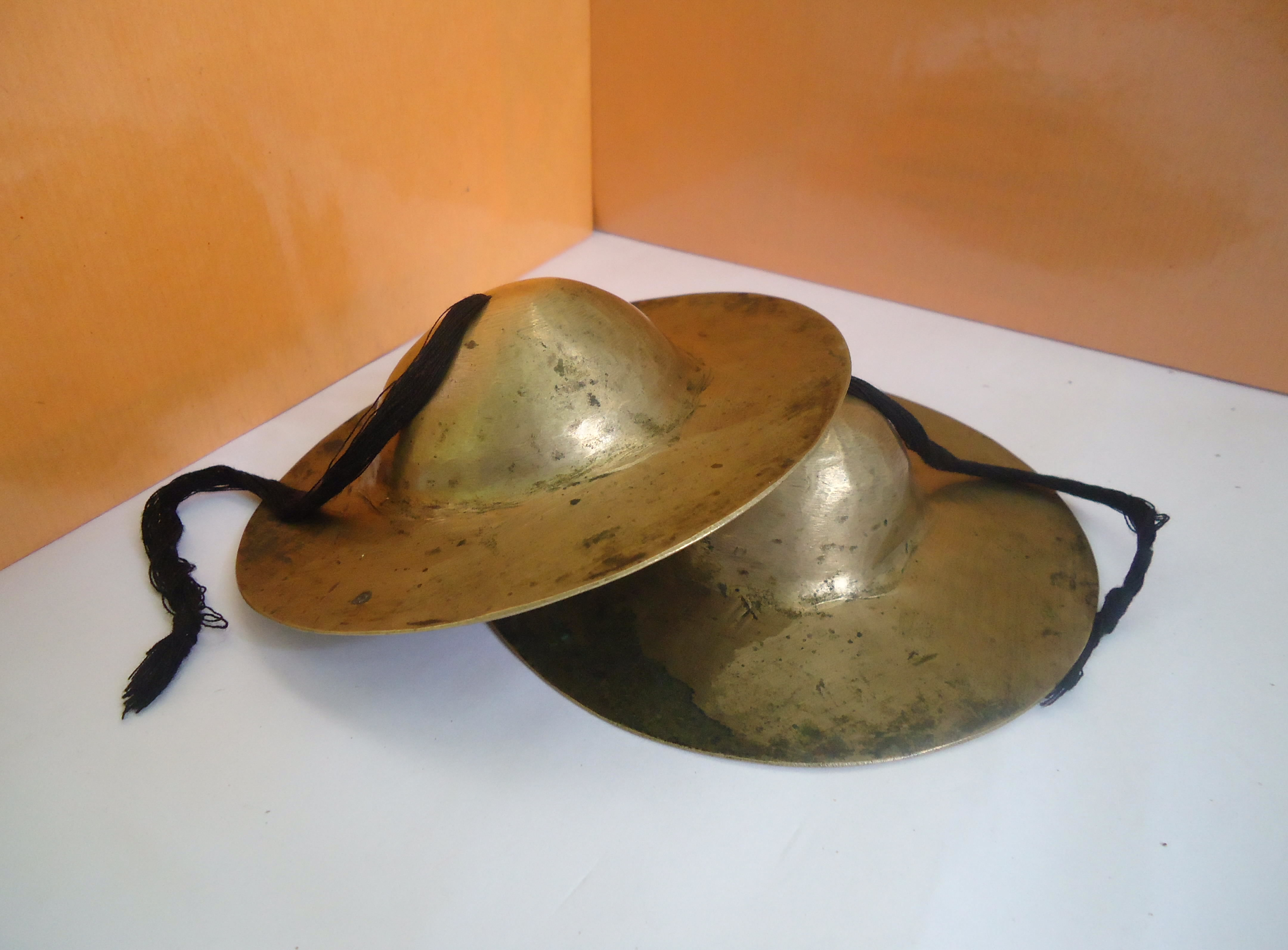

The taal or manjira (also spelled manjīrā or manjeera), jalra, karatala, kartal or gini is a pair of clash cymbals, originating in the Indian subcontinent, which make high-pitched percussion sounds. In its simplest form, it consists of a pair of small hand cymbals. The word taal comes from the Sanskrit word Tālà, which literally means a clap. It is a part of Indian music and culture, used in various traditional customs e.g. Bihu music, Harinaam etc. It is a type of Ghana vadya.

In Hindu religious contexts it is known as karatala (karatāla; kara "hand", "arm" and tāla "rhythm", "beat"), typically used to accompany devotional music such as bhajan and kirtan. They are commonly used by Hare Krishna devotees when performing harinam, but are ubiquitous to all Hindu devotional music. It is also called karatala or kartal (pronounced as “kartel”) in some contexts. In Mayalayam it is called the kaimani (Malayalam: കൈമാനി, lit. 'hand bell').

== Types ==
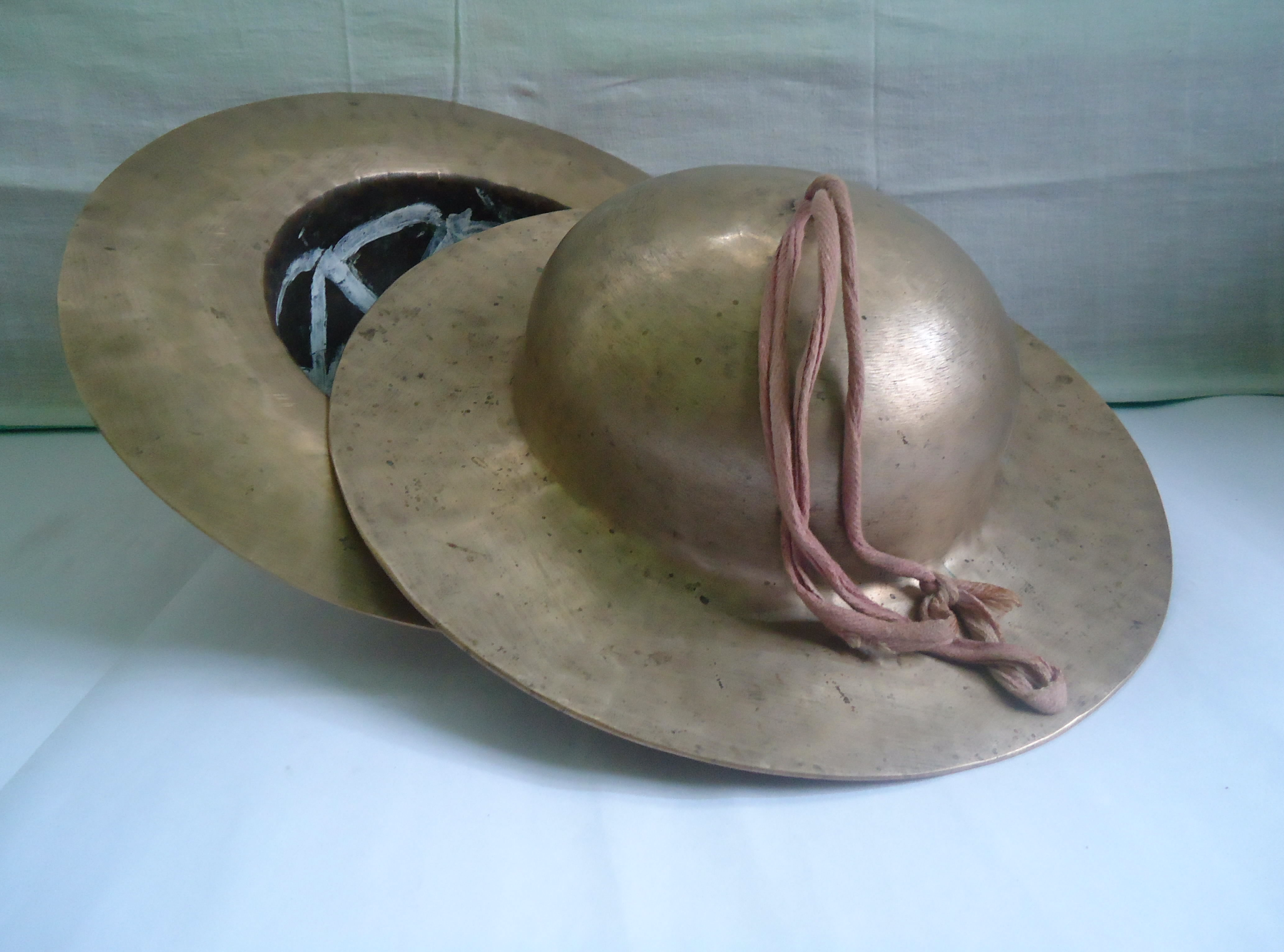
Larger version of manjira, Taal

There are many types of Taal, categorised by size, weight and appearance.

- Bortaal is the big size clash cymbal, Its weight approx. 1½−2 kg. The player who plays Bortaal is called in Assam as Gayan. Bortaal is a symbol of Assamese traditional culture. Sometimes, the players perform dance-music with both e.g. in Gayan-Bayan, Bortaal Nritya etc. Sometimes the player perform with only music e.g. in Harinaam, Dihanaam etc. The rhythmic high-pitched sound of the Bortaal makes the surroundings pure and sacred.
- Majutaal is medium size clash cymbal,
- Khutitaal or Xarutaal is small size clash cymbal. It is also known as Manjira or Karatala. It is generally used in traditional, folk and classical music in India. It is also used in dance in Bharat Natyam, Kuchipudi Manipuri Mohiniattam Andhra Natyam Kathakali This Instrument has some other names e.g. thaaleaj (Kashmir), taalam, tala, jalra etc.
- Ramtaal or Khoritaal are two wooden handled musical instruments, containing multiple pairs of small cymbals. It is generally known India as Khartal.

== Nepal ==
See List of Nepali musical instruments

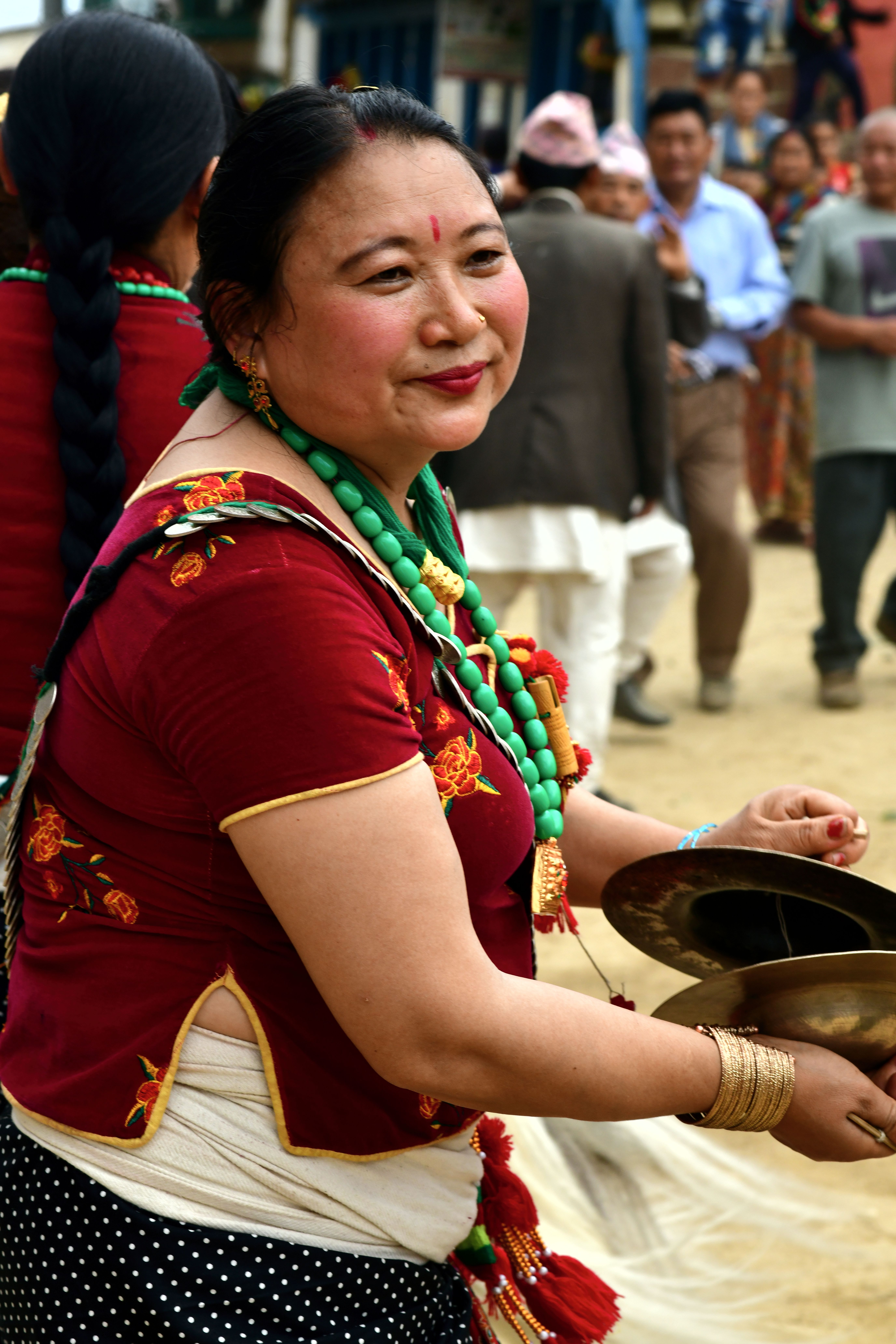
Woman with Jhyamta cymbals, Nepal.

The instrument is played in Nepal as well, known as the Jhyamta (Nepali: झ्याम्टा) (phonetic: Jhyāmṭā), a Nepali traditional musical instrument. The Kirat community uses this with dhol (kirat)) in various cultural festivals such as Sakela, Chyabrung, Udhauli, Ubhauli and other social functions.

== Tibet ==
In Tibetan culture, the tingsha is a very similar instrument.

== Uses ==
Manjiras are commonly played in folk and devotional music. They are played in various religious events and ceremonies in India and especially in bhajans. Manjiras are ancient musical instruments. Manjiras can be seen in many ancient temple pictures.

=== Marathi and Gujrati folk music ===
Manjiras have a significant importance in Gujarati and Marathi folk music. In Maharashtra they are known as Taal. Initially Manjiras were played in aarti. In Gujarat and Maharashtra, manjiras hold great importance and are played in bhajan, santvani and dayro.

== See also ==
- List of Indian musical instruments
