= Tingsha =

Small cymbals used in prayer and rituals by Tibetan Buddhist practitioners

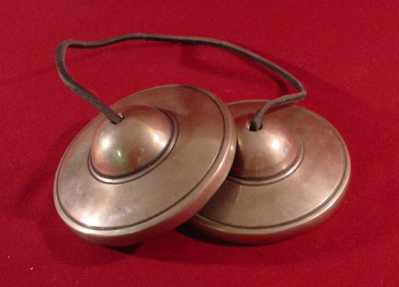
Tingsha

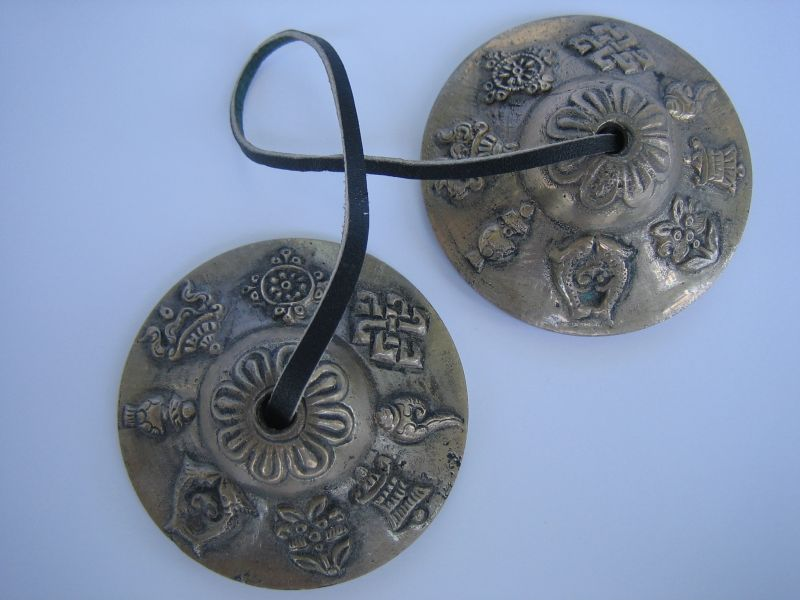
Tingsha cymbals designed with the eight auspicious symbols

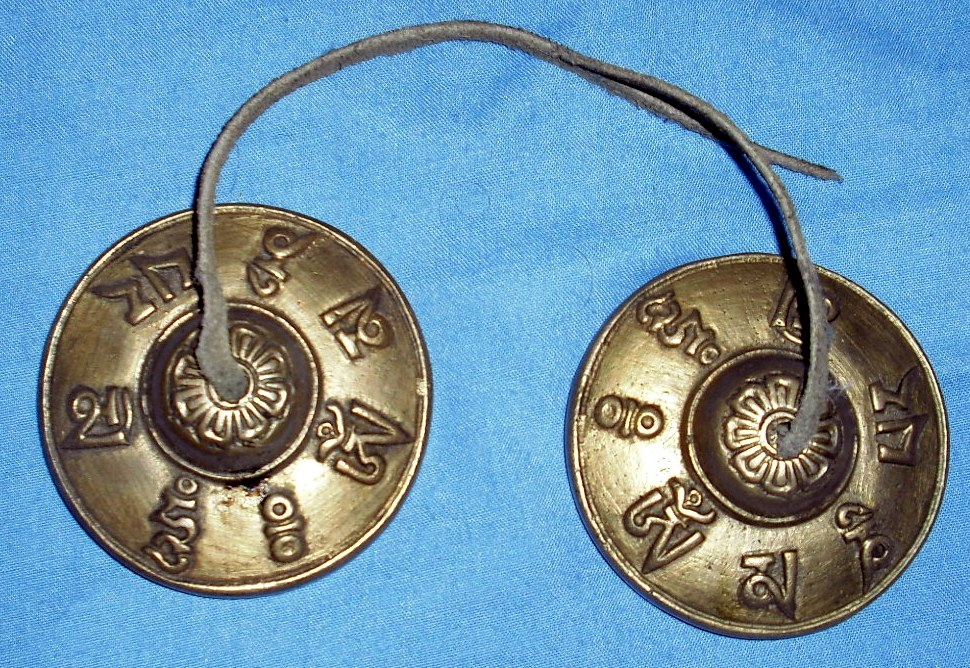
Tibetan tingsha bells with the mantra Om Mani Padme Hung mantra written round them

Tingsha, or ting-sha (Tibetan: ཏིང་ཤགས་, Wylie: ting-shags), are small cymbals used in prayer and rituals by Tibetan Buddhist practitioners. Two cymbals are joined by a leather strap or chain. The cymbals are struck together producing a clear and high pitched tone. Typical sizes range from 2.5 to 4 inches in diameter. Tingsha are very thick and produce a unique long ringing tone. Antique tingsha were made from special bronze alloys that produce harmonic overtones.

== See also ==
- Khartal
- Zill
- Castanets
- Cymbal

== Bibliography ==
- Beer, Robert (2004). Tibetan Ting-Sha: Sacred Sound for Spiritual Growth. Connections Press. ISBN 1-85906-153-2.
