= Ride cymbal =

Percussion element

The ride cymbal is a cymbal of material sustain used to maintain a beat in music. A standard in most drum kits, the ride's function is to maintain a steady pattern, sometimes called a ride pattern, rather than provide the accent of a crash cymbal. It is normally placed on the extreme right (or dominant hand) of a drum set, above the floor tom. It is often described as delivering a "shimmering" sound when struck soundly with a drumstick, and a clear ping when struck atop its bell.

The ride can fulfill any function or rhythm the hi-hat cymbal does, with the exception of an open and closed sound.

== Types ==
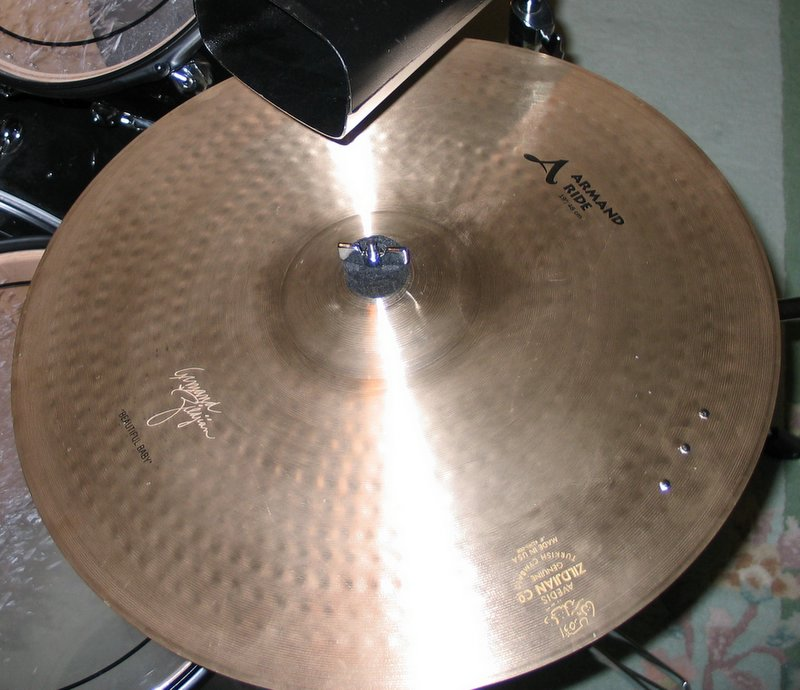
A Zildjian 19" Armand Ride Cymbal

The term ride may depict either the function or characteristic of the instrument. Most cymbal makers manufacture specific cymbals for the purpose.

Alternatively, some drummers use a china cymbal, a sizzle cymbal or a specialized tone such as a swish or pang as a ride cymbal. When playing extremely softly, when using brushes, and when recording in a studio, even a thin crash may serve well as a ride cymbal.

When playing extremely loudly, a cymbal designed as a ride may deliver a very loud, long crash, due to its superior sustain after being struck.

=== Crash/ride ===
Cymbals designated crash/ride or more rarely ride/crash serve as either a large slow crash or secondary ride, or in very small kits as the only suspended cymbal.

=== Flat ride ===
Bell-less ride cymbals, known as flat rides, have a dry crash and clear stick definition. Quieter, they are popular in jazz drumming. Developed by Paiste in the 1960s, flat rides are used by notable drummers Roy Haynes, Jack DeJohnette, Jo Jones and Charlie Watts.

The highly regarded Paiste 602 Flat Ride was reissued in 2010, but is only available in 20" medium.

=== Swish and pang ===
Swish and pang cymbals are exotic ride and crash/ride cymbals similar to china cymbals in tone.

=== Sizzle cymbal ===
A sizzle cymbal, thinner and one size larger than the main ride, was common in some styles of early rock music as a secondary ride cymbal, particularly for accompanying guitar lead breaks.

== Sound ==
When struck, a ride cymbal makes a sustained, shimmering sound rather than the shorter, decaying sound of a crash cymbal. The most common diameter for a ride cymbal is about 20 inches (51 cm), but anything from 18 inches (46 cm) to 22 inches (56 cm) is standard. Smaller and thinner cymbals tend to be darker with more shimmer, while larger and thicker cymbals tend to respond better in louder volume situations, and conversely. Rides of up to 26 inches (66 cm) and down to 16 inches (41 cm) are readily available, and down to 8 inches (20 cm) are currently manufactured. The very thickest and loudest tend to be about 22 inches, with larger rides restricted to medium and medium thin thicknesses.

Audio samples
Component	Content	Audio (Vorbis)
Ride	Hit on the bow	61 KB
Ride	Hit on the bell of the cymbal	71 KB
Ride	Hit on the rim	67 KB
See the Drums page at Wikimedia Commons for more

In rock or jazz, the ride cymbal is most often struck regularly in a rhythmic pattern as part of the accompaniment to the song. Often the drummer will vary between the same pattern either on the hi-hat cymbal or the ride cymbal, playing for example the hi-hat in the verses and the ride in the instrumentals and/or choruses.

The sound of a ride cymbal also varies depending on what kind of mallet is used to hit it. In rock and metal, wood and nylon-tipped drum sticks are common; wood creates a smoother, quieter sound, whereas nylon tips create more of a "ping". It creates a low vibration to keep a steady beat, but a low sound volume. The bell, the bulge in the center of the cymbal, creates a brighter, less sustained sound. The bell creates such a brilliant tone compared to the subtle sound of the bow that it is often used as somewhat of another cymbal. Some ride cymbals, seen more often in various forms of metal and harder subgenres of rock, have an unusually large bell. This lessens the accuracy required to repeatedly hit the bell in fast patterns, and produces a louder, brighter tone than in most ride-cymbal bells.

== Pattern ==
Eighth-note ride pattern
Eighth-note ride pattern (left)

Modern use of the ride cymbal was inspired by jazz drummer Baby Dodds's press roll rhythms. According to the Percussive Arts Society, which inducted him into its hall of fame, "Dodds' way of playing press rolls ultimately evolved into the standard jazz ride-cymbal pattern. Whereas many drummers would play very short press rolls on the backbeats, Dodds would start his rolls on the backbeats but extend each one to the following beat, providing a smoother time flow."

The most basic ride pattern in rock and other styles is:

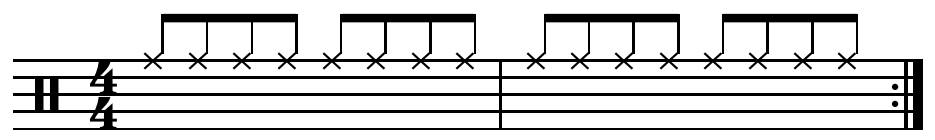

In jazz, this would normally be played with a swing.
