= Clash cymbals =

Unpitched percussion instrument

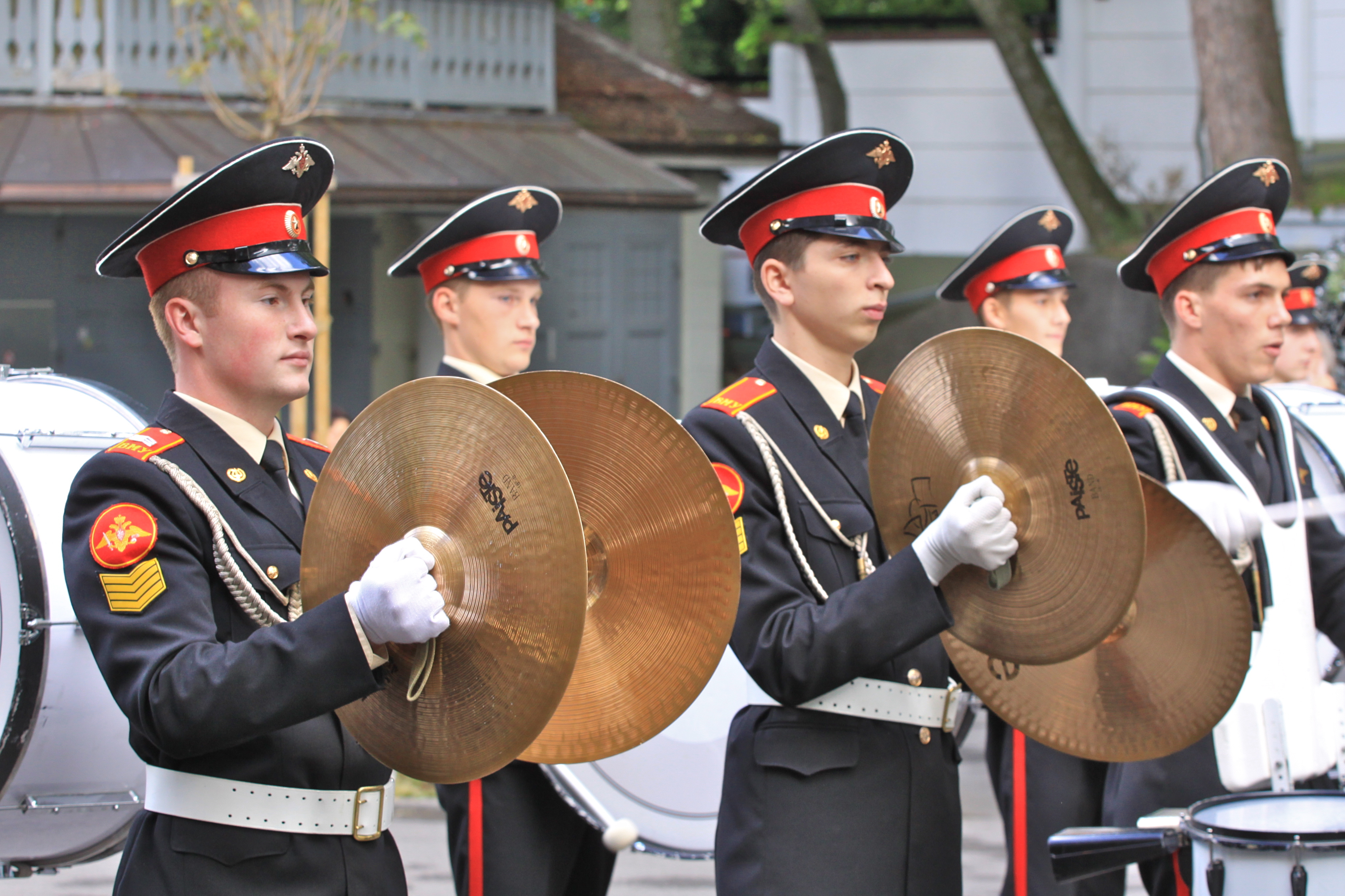
- Two sets of clash cymbals in use in a marching band

Percussion instrument
- Classification: Percussion
- Hornbostel–Sachs classification: 111.142 (Cymbals: Vessel clappers with everted rim)

Clash cymbals (also called concert cymbals, orchestral cymbals, or crash cymbals) are cymbals played in matched pairs by holding one cymbal in each hand and striking the two together.

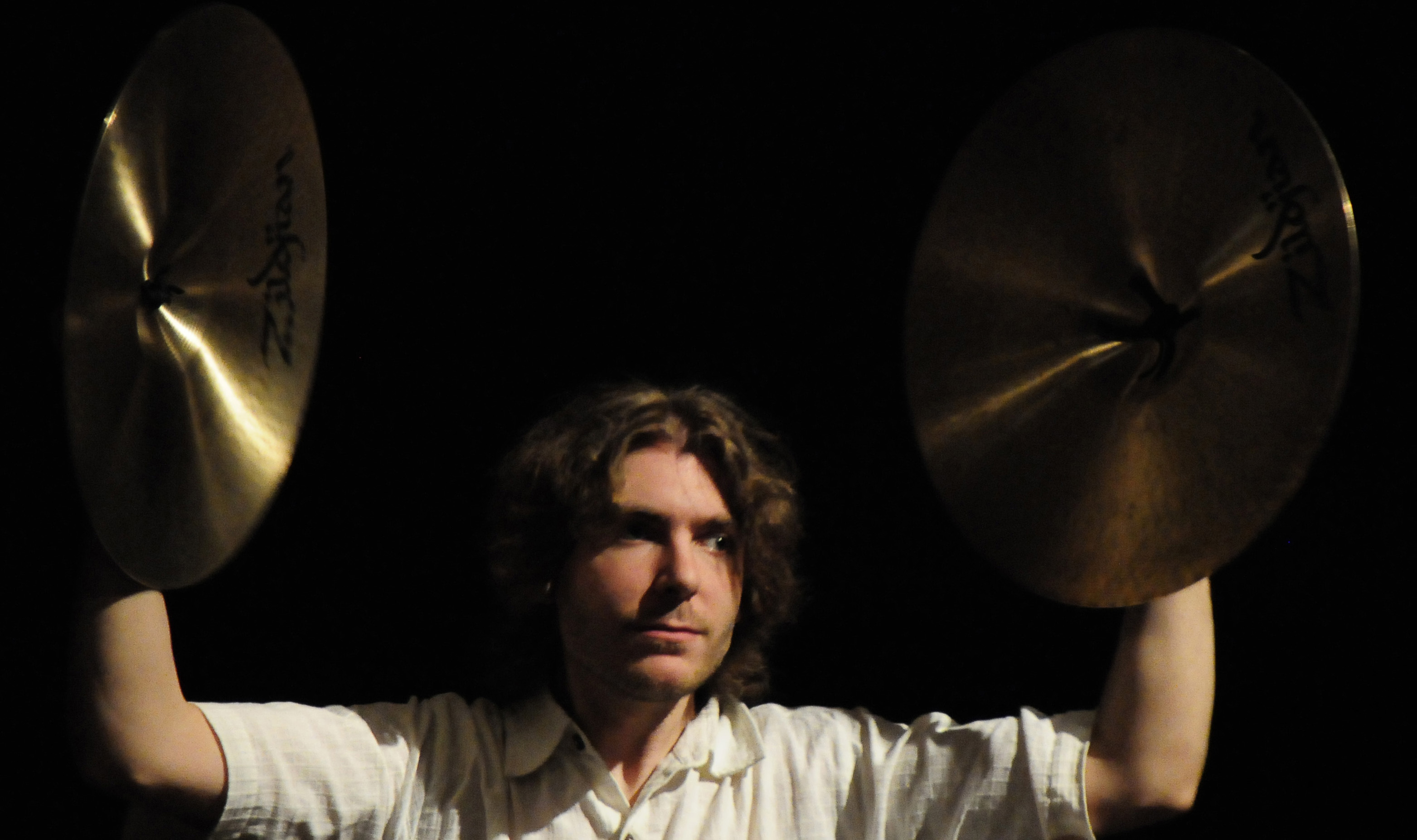
Zildjian clash cymbals after a big crash

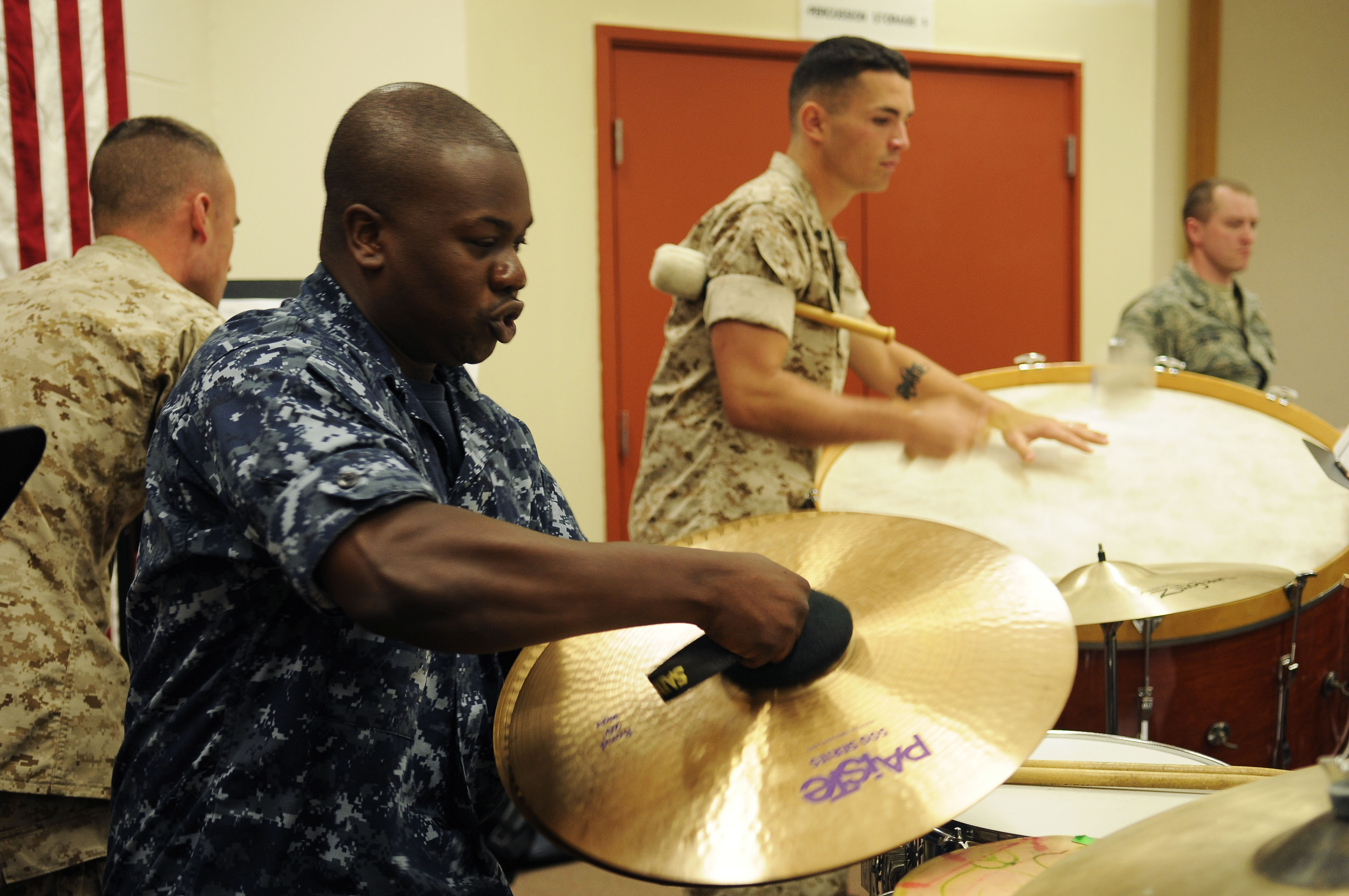
Paiste clash cymbals in use in a percussion section

To differentiate this type of cymbal from a suspended cymbal, they are also called hand cymbals.

== Terminology ==
In musical scores, clash cymbals are normally indicated as cymbals or sometimes simply C.C. If another type of cymbal, for example, a suspended cymbal, is required in an orchestral score, then for historical reasons this is often also indicated cymbals. Some composers and arrangers use the plural cymbals or crash cymbals to indicate clash cymbals, with the singular cymbal to indicate a suspended cymbal.

Composers will often condense the clash cymbals and a suspended cymbal into the same part. There are a number of techniques used to indicate which is desired. Whenever with stick or with mallet is written, a suspended cymbal is used. A return to clash cymbals can be specified with the Italian phrase a due. Russian composers developed a notation to differentiate between clash and suspended cymbals in which a + (plus sign) is written over a note to be played on suspended cymbal and a ° (open circle) is written over a note to be played with clash cymbals.

In foreign language scores, such types of cymbals are known as piatti or cinelli (in Italian), die Becken (in German), and les cymbales (in French).

== Technique ==
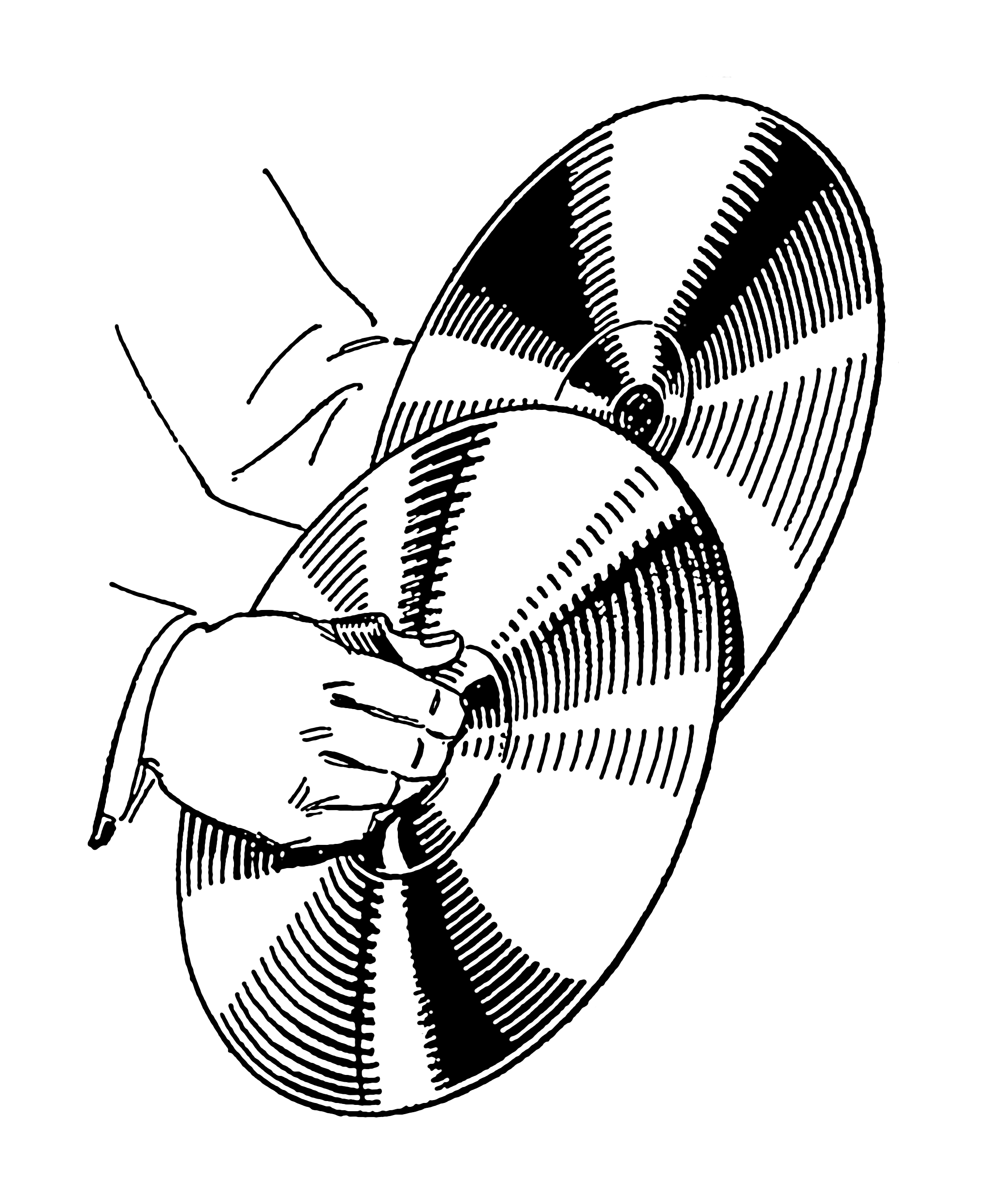
Playing clash cymbals

=== Classical music ===
In an orchestral context, the cymbals are held by their straps with the thumb and index finger closest to the bell, not unlike holding a drumstick. The cymbals are held at a 45-degree angle with the dominant hand holding the cymbal over the other. To crash, there is a brief prep motion in which the arms move away from each other, before finally dropping the dominant handed cymbal on top of the bottom cymbal. Properly played crashes will be played like a flam where the bottom of the cymbals touch before meeting at the top. This is done to prevent any air pockets from occurring.

There are several ways to hold the cymbals after the crash. Some practitioners hold the cymbals up and vertically with the inside of the cymbal facing the audience. This actually shortens the sustain as the sound is transferred up rather than out and causes the hands to be in contact with the cymbal. Other practitioners hold the cymbals parallel to the floor. This allows for the most sound to reach the audience as the sound is transferred horizontally.

=== Marching arts ===
In a marching ensemble, such as a drum corps or marching band, cymbals will often be marched as part of the drumline. The technique of marching cymbals is vastly different from that of orchestral cymbals. Typically, marching cymbalist employ a technique known as "Garfield grip" (named after its use by the Garfield Cadets Drum and Bugle Corps) in which the hand is placed through the straps and twisted to let the palm rest on top of the bell. This technique allows for greater control over the instrument and for movements known as "visuals" – flashy maneuvers such as flips and twirls.

There has been a trend in recent years to replace the cymbal line with cymbals in the front ensemble, although cymbals still remain a vital instrument in indoor percussion ensembles.

=== Hi-hats ===
A drum kit normally contains one pair of clash cymbals mounted on a pedal-operated hi-hat stand. These are commonly far smaller and lighter than hand-operated clash cymbals, and are played with drum sticks as well as clashed together using the pedal. The hi-hat arose out of the need for vaudeville pit orchestras to combine the roles of a bass drummer, snare drummer, and cymbalist into one player, eventually forming the modern drum set.

== Sizes ==
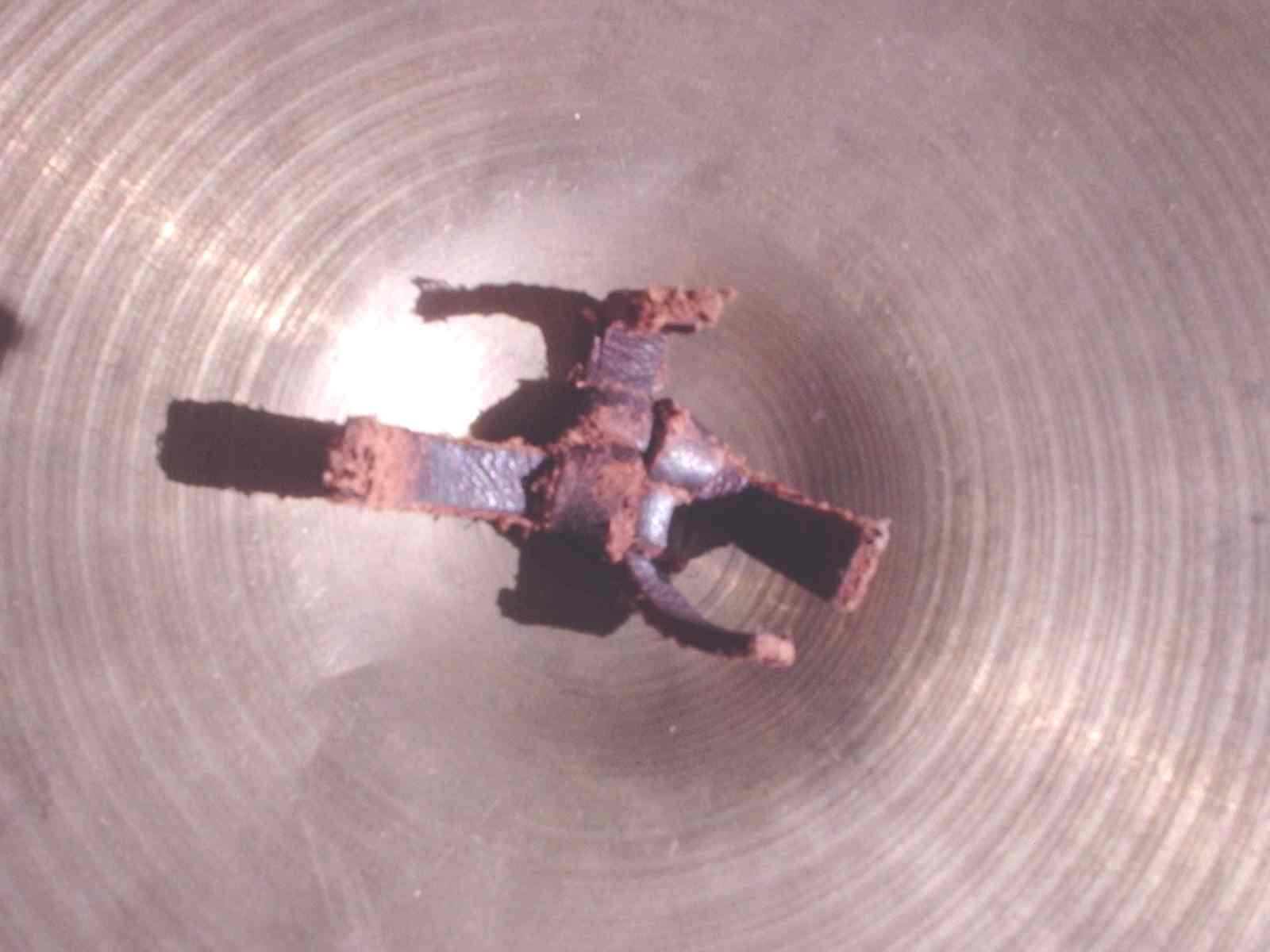
The traditional four-cornered strap knot

Clash cymbals come in matched pairs. They are commonly found in three weights:

- French, leggero, or light
- Viennese, medio, or medium
- Germanic, Wagnerian, or heavy

Instruments of all weights range in size from 14" to 22" in diameter. The smallest and thickest tend to have the higher pitch, the thinner ones allow for greater expression, and the largest have the greatest volume.

== Straps ==
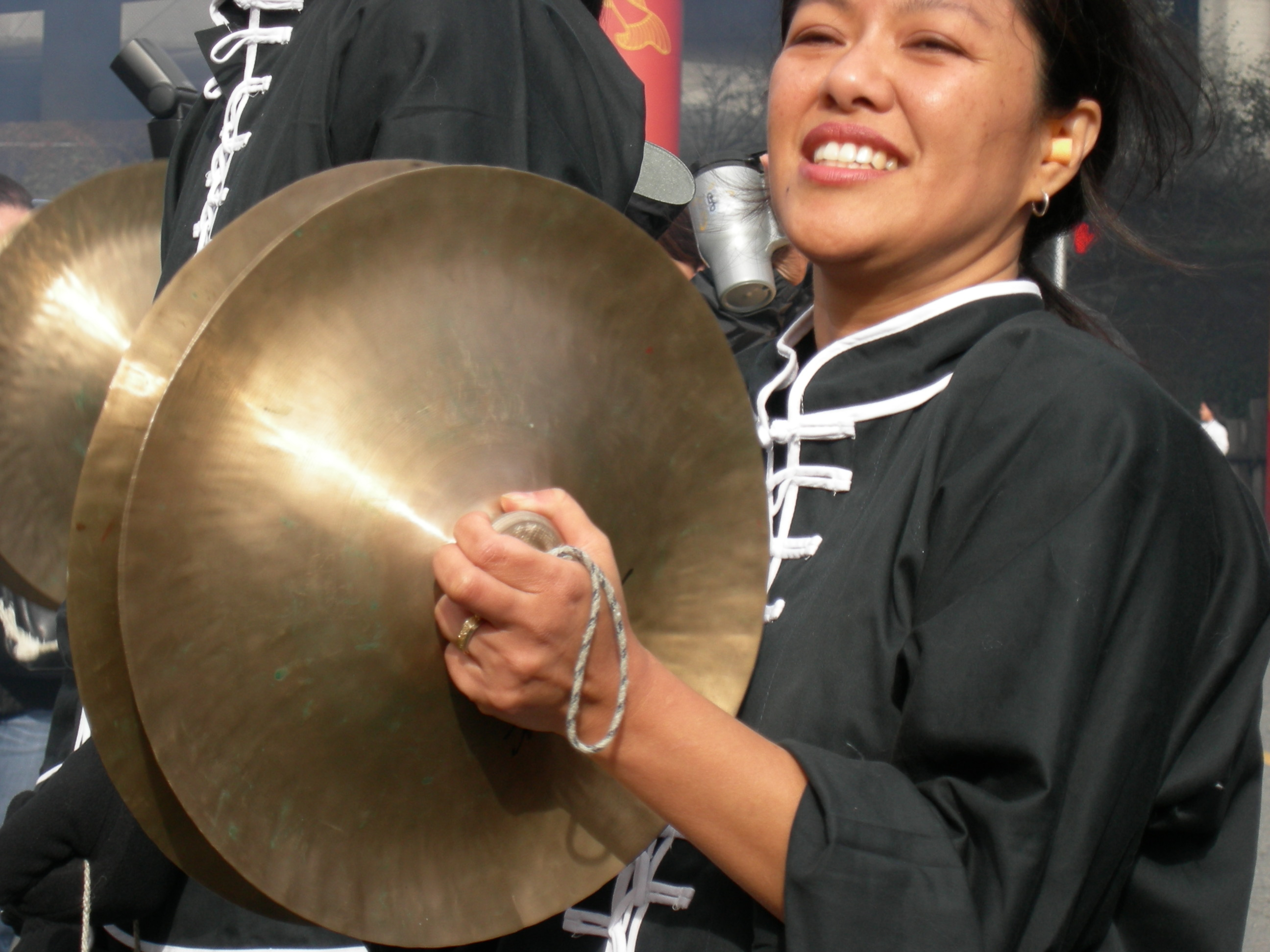
Playing Chinese clash cymbals

Orchestral clash cymbals have leather or nylon straps passed through the holes in their bells, leading to four tails which are knotted inside the bell, to allow the percussionist to hold them. Marching cymbal lines use leather pads placed on the bell to cushion the hands.

Chinese clash cymbals need no handles as the squared bells can be held quite securely without them and are often joined by a cord through the holes in their bells which allows the percussionist to release the bells after striking, producing less damping and greater sustain, and swing the cymbals producing doppler effects.

== See also ==
- Zills, also known as finger cymbals
- Taal, a type of Indian clash cymbal
