= Meinl Percussion =

Percussion instrument manufacturer

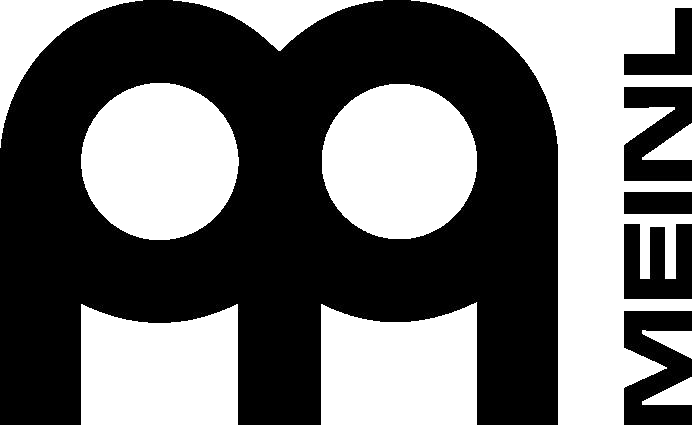
- Company type: Private
- Industry: Musical instruments
- Founded: 1951; 75 years ago
- Founder: Roland Meinl
- Headquarters: Gutenstetten, Germany
- Products: List: bendirs; batá drums; berimbaus; bodhráns; bongo drums; cabasas; cajons; castanets; chimes; congas; cowbells; cymbals; darbukas; didgeridoos; djembes; djembefolas; doumbeks; gongs; güiras; güiros; hand drums; jingle bells; kanjiras; maracas; marimbulas; mbiras; pandeiros; pleneras; repiniques; shakers; surdos; tablas; talking drums; tambourines; timbaus; triangles
- Website: meinlpercussion.com

Meinl Percussion is a manufacturer of percussion instruments based in Gutenstetten, Germany. The company’s cymbal production is one of the "big four" manufacturers of cymbals, along with Zildjian, Sabian, and Paiste.

In addition to cymbals, Meinl manufactures a very wide range of percussion instruments including bongo drums, cajons, congas, tablas, timbales, djembes, güiros, pandeiros, and tambourines.

== History ==
The "Roland Meinl Musikinstrumente" was founded in 1951 by Roland Meinl. Initially the company produced wind instruments, beginning the production of cymbals only in 1952. The first Meinl cymbals were cut out of large metal sheets, hammered, lathed and drilled by hand by Roland Meinl himself, who subsequently transported them to the Neustadt an der Aisch railstation on the luggage carrier of his bike.

In the 1960s about half of the production was exported to the United States together with German-made Tromsa drumsets. The first employee, Gustav Strobel, was hired in 1964 and worked for the company for almost 40 years. At about the same time Roland Meinl began to import affordable music instruments from Japan, being one of the first Pearl importers in Europe. He later began to import Tama and Ibanez instruments.

In 1974 Meinl was the first cymbal company to offer pre-pack cymbal sets. Meinl's initial cymbal production focused on low-budget cymbals, and it wasn't until 1984 with the "Profile Series" that Meinl started to really focus on professional-level cymbals. The first Meinl pro series was the "King-Beat Series", introduced in 1976.

In 1990 Meinl introduced the "Tri-Tonal Series", their first signature series developed with Billy Cobham. The series was discontinued a year later. In 2006 Meinl began the production of the "Mb10 Series", made out of B10 bronze alloy (90% copper and 10% tin), making them the only company to produce cymbals out of four different bronze alloys (B8, B10, B12 and B20 bronze).

On December 4, 2007 company founder Roland Meinl died at the age of 78.

Meinl products

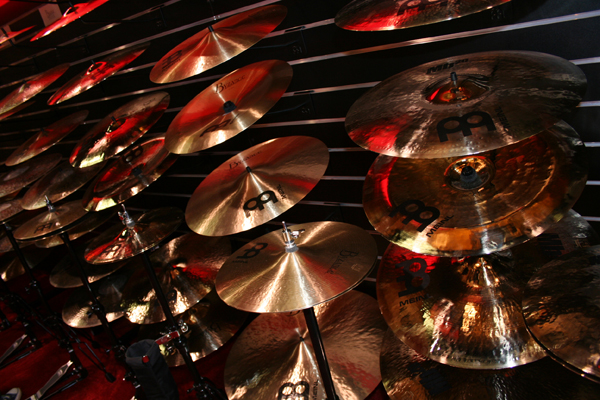
Cymbals

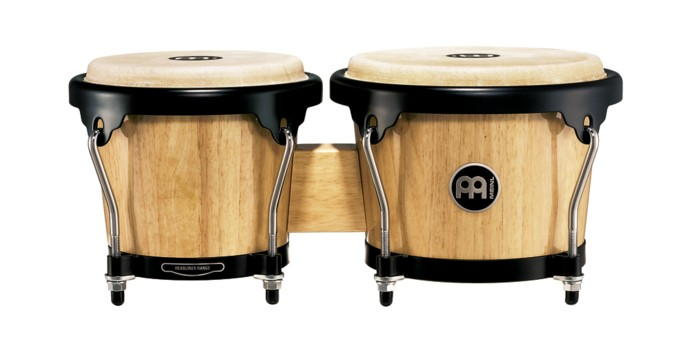
Bongos

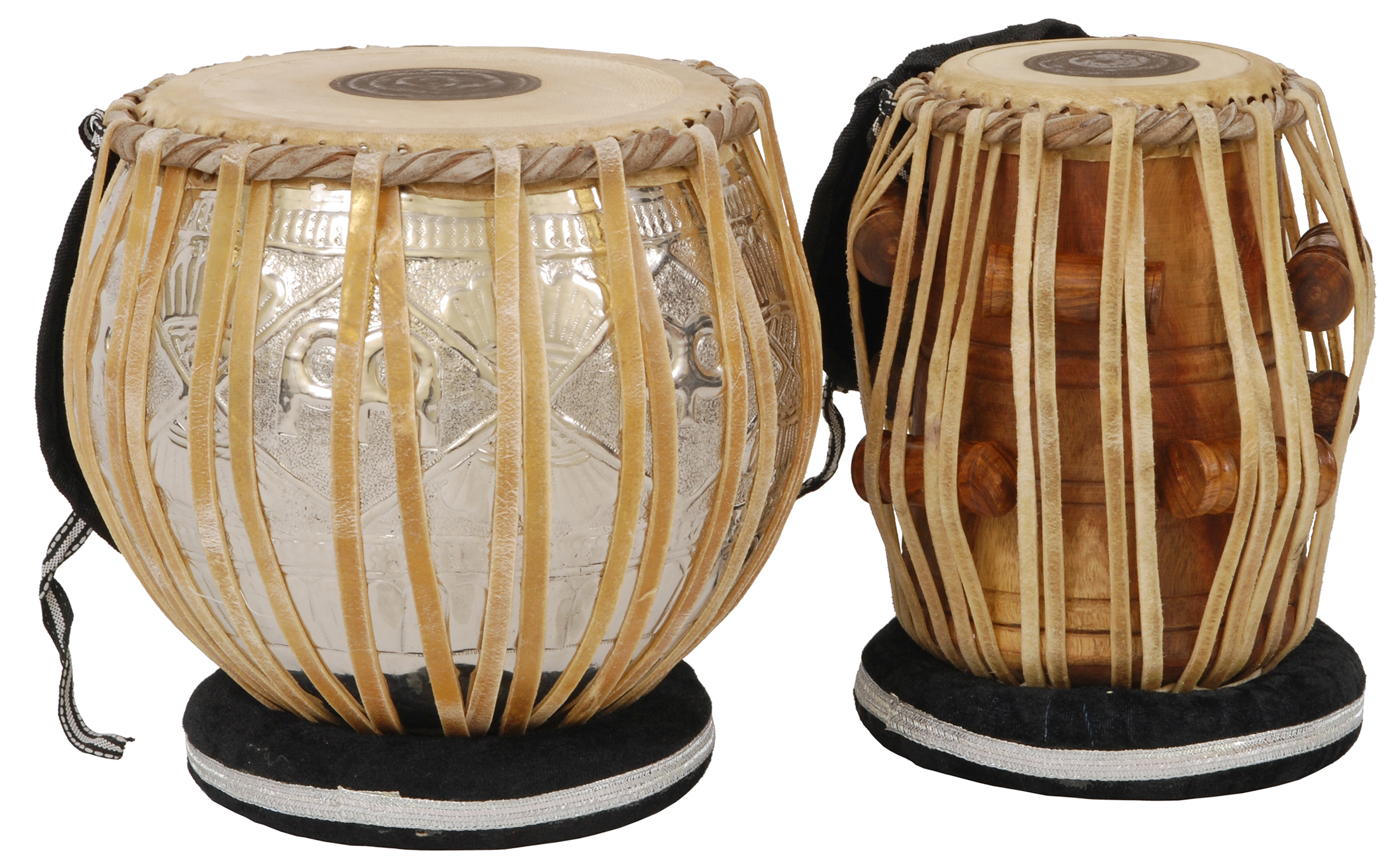
Indian tabla

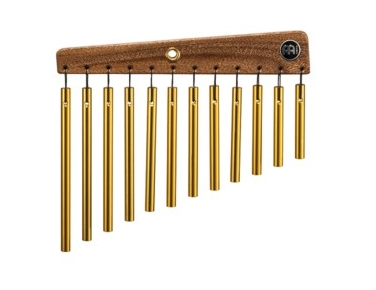
Bar chimes

== See also ==
- List of drum makers
