= Cymbal =

Unpitched percussion instrument

Cymbals
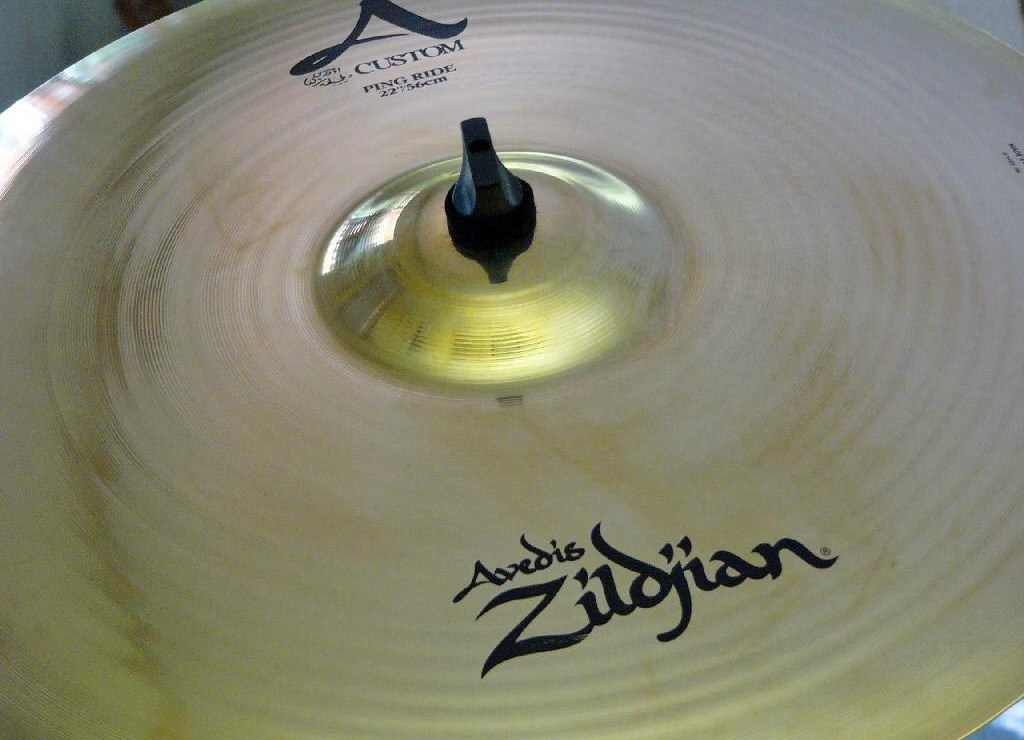
- A 22″ Avedis Zildjian cymbal

Percussion instrument
- Classification: Percussion
- Hornbostel–Sachs classification: 111.142 if played in pairs, or 111.242 if played with a hand or beater (Concussion or percussion vessels)
- Developed: 7th century BCE

Related instruments
- Crotales are sometimes called cymbales anciens

Builders
- Zildjian, Sabian, Paiste, Meinl, Istanbul Agop

More articles or information
- Clash cymbals, suspended cymbal, crash cymbal, ride cymbal, china cymbal, splash cymbal, sizzle cymbal, hi-hat, zill

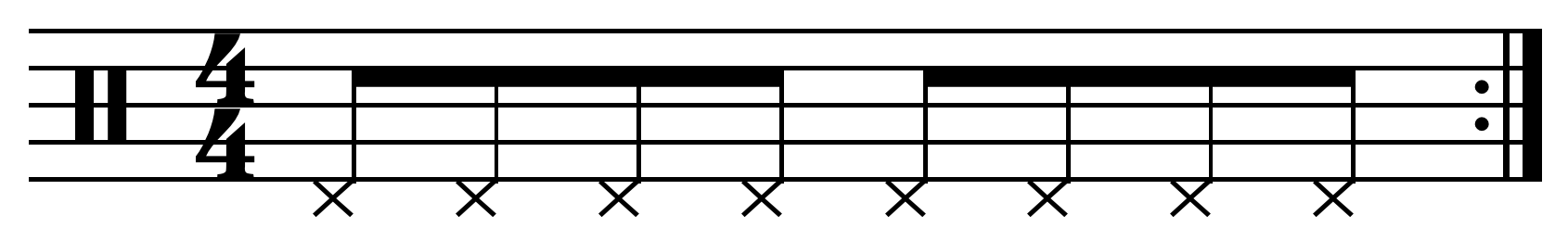
Characteristic rock hi-hat pattern.

The cymbals (/ˈsɪmbəlz/) are common percussion instruments. Often used in pairs, cymbals consist of thin, normally round plates of various copper alloys. The majority of cymbals are of indefinite pitch, although small disc-shaped cymbals based on ancient designs (such as crotales) sound a definite note. Cymbals are used in many ensembles ranging from the orchestra and percussion ensembles to jazz bands, rock bands, and marching bands. Drum kits usually incorporate at least a crash, a ride, or a crash/ride cymbal and a pair of hi-hat cymbals. A player of cymbals is known as a cymbalist.

A cymbalist using a cymbal as part of a larger musical arrangement.

== Etymology and names ==
The word cymbal is derived from the Latin cymbalum, which is the latinisation from Greek κύμβαλον (kymbalon) 'cymbal', which in turn derives from Ancient Greek κύμβη (kymbē) 'cup, bowl'.

In orchestral scores, cymbals may be indicated by the French cymbales; German Becken, Schellbecken, Teller, or Tschinellen; Italian piatti or cinelli; and Spanish platillos. Many of these derive from the word for plates.

== History ==
Cymbals have existed since ancient times. Representations of cymbals may be found in reliefs and paintings from Armenian Highlands (7th century BC), Larsa, Babylon, Assyria, ancient Egypt, ancient Greece, and ancient Rome. References to cymbals also appear throughout the Bible, through many Psalms and songs of praise to God. Cymbals may have been introduced to China from Central Asia in the 3rd or 4th century AD.

=== India ===
In India, cymbals have been in use since ancient times and are still used across almost all major temples and Buddhist sites. Gigantic aartis along the Ganges, which are revered by Hindus all over the world, are incomplete without large cymbals.

=== Iran and Central Asia ===
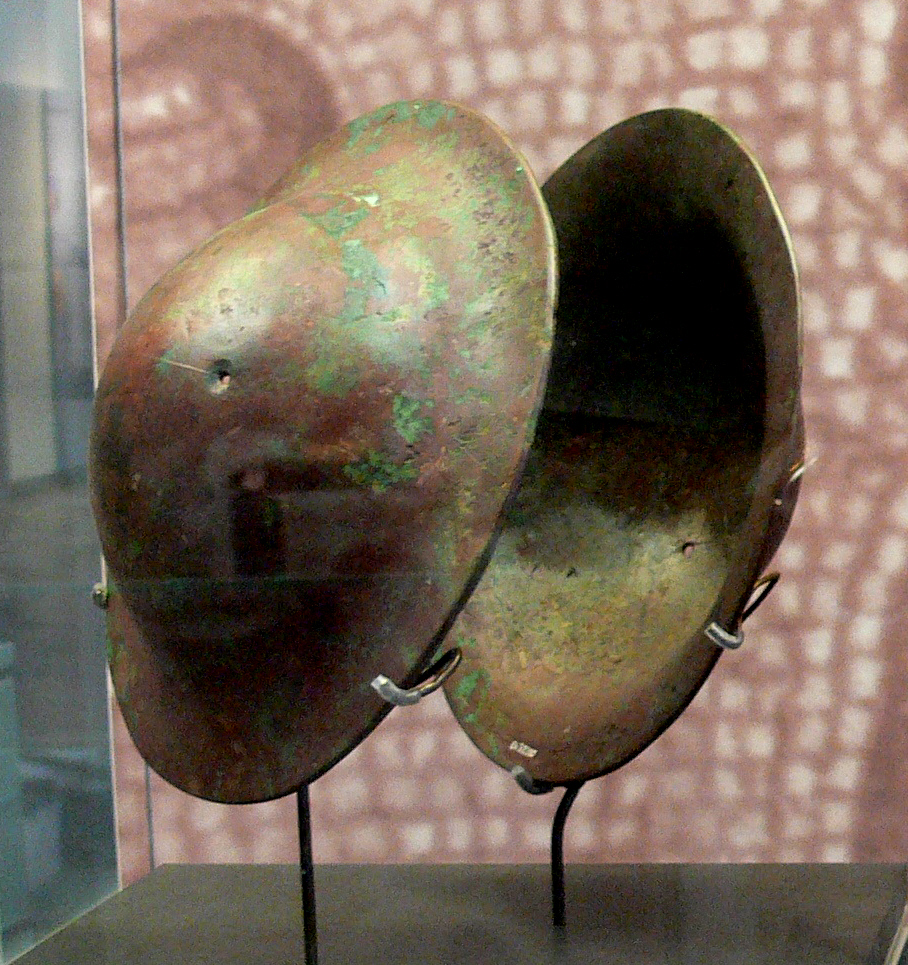
Mesopotamian cymbals from the 3rd millennium B.C. show that the large cymbal dates back into antiquity.

The Shahnameh (circa 977 and 1010 CE) mentions the use of cymbals at least 14 times in its text, most in the context of creating a loud din in war, to frighten the enemy or to celebrate. The Persian word is sanj or senj (سنج), but the Shahnameh does not claim these to be Persian in origin. Several times it calls them "Indian cymbals." Other adjectives to describe them include "golden" and "brass," and to play them is to "clash" them.

A different form is called sanj angshati (سنج انگشتی), these are zill.

==== Ashura ceremony ====
Besides the original use in war, another use in Persian culture was the Ashura ceremony. Originally in the ceremony, two pieces of stone were beaten on the sides of the mourner with special movements accompanied by a lamentation song. This has been replaced by beating Karbzani or Karebzani and playing sanj and ratchets. Cities where this has been performed include Lahijan and Aran of Kashan, as well as Semnan and Sabzevar.

==== Etymology ====
See Zang

All theories about the etymology of the word Sanj, identify it as a Pahlavi word. By some accounts means weight; and it is possible that the original term was sanjkūb meaning ”striking weights” [against each other]. By some accounts the word is reform version of "Zang" (bell), referring to its bell-shaped plate.

=== Turkey ===
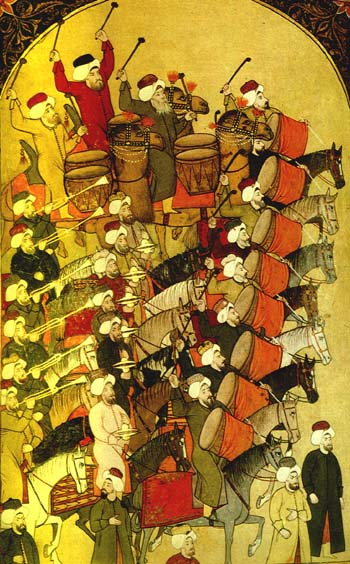
Miniature from the Surname-i Vebbi (fol. 172a), showing cymbals being used in military setting by a Turkish army. Descriptions of this kind of use date as far back as the Shahnameh, circa 977-1010 A.D.

Cymbals were employed by Turkish janissaries in the 14th century or earlier. By the 17th century, such cymbals were used in European music, and more commonly played in military bands and orchestras by the mid 18th century. Since the 19th century, some composers have called for larger roles for cymbals in musical works, and a variety of cymbal shapes, techniques, and hardware have been developed in response.

== Anatomy ==
The anatomy of the cymbal plays a large part in the sound it creates. A hole is drilled in the center of the cymbal, which is used to either mount the cymbal on a stand or for tying straps through (for hand playing). The bell, dome, or cup is the raised section immediately surrounding the hole. The bell produces a higher "pinging" pitch than the rest of the cymbal. The bow is the rest of the surface surrounding the bell. The bow is sometimes described in two areas: the ride and crash area. The ride area is the thicker section closer to the bell while the crash area is the thinner tapering section near the edge. The edge or rim is the immediate circumference of the cymbal.

Cymbals are measured by their diameter either in inches or centimeters. The size of the cymbal affects its sound, larger cymbals usually being louder and having longer sustain. The weight describes how thick the cymbal is. Cymbal weights are important to the sound they produce and how they play. Heavier cymbals have a louder volume, more cut, and better stick articulation (when using drum sticks). Thin cymbals have a fuller sound, lower pitch, and faster response.

The profile of the cymbal is the vertical distance of the bow from the bottom of the bell to the cymbal edge (higher profile cymbals are more bowl-shaped). The profile affects the pitch of the cymbal: higher profile cymbals have higher pitch.

== Types ==
=== Orchestral cymbals ===
Cymbals offer a composer nearly endless amounts of color and effect. Their unique timbre allows them to project even against a full orchestra and through the heaviest of orchestrations and enhance articulation and nearly any dynamic. Cymbals have been utilized historically to suggest frenzy, fury or bacchanalian revels, as seen in the Venus music in Wagner's Tannhäuser, Grieg's Peer Gynt suite, and Osmin's aria "O wie will ich triumphieren" from Mozart's Die Entführung aus dem Serail.

=== Clash cymbals ===
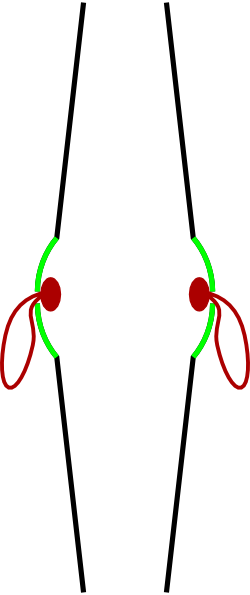
A pair of clash cymbals in cross section. The bell is in green and the straps are in red.

Orchestral clash cymbals are traditionally used in pairs, each one having a strap set in the bell of the cymbal by which they are held. Such a pair is known as clash cymbals, crash cymbals, hand cymbals, or plates. Certain sounds can be obtained by rubbing their edges together in a sliding movement for a "sizzle", striking them against each other in what is called a "crash", tapping the edge of one against the body of the other in what is called a "tap-crash", scraping the edge of one from the inside of the bell to the edge for a "scrape" or "zischen", or shutting the cymbals together and choking the sound in what is called a "hi-hat" or "crush". A skilled percussionist can obtain an enormous dynamic range from such cymbals. For example, in Beethoven's Symphony No. 9, the percussionist is employed to first play cymbals pianissimo, adding a touch of colour rather than loud crash.

Crash cymbals are usually damped by pressing them against the percussionist's body. A composer may write laissez vibrer, or, "let vibrate" (usually abbreviated l.v.), secco (dry), or equivalent indications on the score; more usually, the percussionist must judge when to damp based on the written duration of a crash and the context in which it occurs. Crash cymbals have traditionally been accompanied by the bass drum playing an identical part. This combination, played loudly, is an effective way to accentuate a note since it contributes to both very low and very high-frequency ranges and provides a satisfying "crash-bang-wallop". In older music the composer sometimes provided one part for this pair of instruments, writing senza piatti or piatti soli (Italian: "without cymbals" or "cymbals only") if only one is needed. This came from the common practice of having one percussionist play using one cymbal mounted to the shell of the bass drum. The percussionist would crash the cymbals with the left hand and use a mallet to strike the bass drum with the right. This method is nowadays often employed in pit orchestras and called for specifically by composers who desire a certain effect. Stravinsky calls for this in his ballet Petrushka, and Mahler calls for this in his Titan Symphony. The modern convention is for the instruments to have independent parts. However, in kit drumming, a cymbal crash is still most often accompanied by a simultaneous kick to the bass drum, which provides a musical effect and support to the crash.

=== Hi hats ===
Crash cymbals evolved into the low-sock and from this to the modern hi-hat. Even in a modern drum kit, they remain paired with the bass drum as the two instruments which are played with the player's feet. However, hi-hat cymbals tend to be heavy with little taper, more similar to a ride cymbal than to a clash cymbal as found in a drum kit, and perform a ride rather than a crash function.

=== Suspended cymbal ===
Another use of cymbals is the suspended cymbal. This instrument takes its name from the traditional method of suspending the cymbal by means of a leather strap or rope, thus allowing the cymbal to vibrate as freely as possible for maximum musical effect. Early jazz drumming pioneers borrowed this style of cymbal mounting during the early 1900s and later drummers further developed this instrument into the mounted horizontal or nearly horizontally mounted "crash" cymbals of a modern drum kit instead of a leather strap suspension system. Many modern drum kits use a mount with felt or otherwise dampening fabric to act as a barrier to hold the cymbals between metal clamps: thus forming the modern-day ride cymbal. Suspended cymbals can be played with yarn-, sponge-, or cord wrapped mallets. The first known instance of using a sponge-headed mallet on a cymbal is the final chord of Hector Berlioz' Symphonie Fantastique. Composers sometimes specifically request other types of mallets like felt mallets or timpani mallets for different attack and sustain qualities. Suspended cymbals can produce bright and slicing tones when forcefully struck, and give an eerie transparent "windy" sound when played quietly. A tremolo, or roll (played with two mallets alternately striking on opposing sides of the cymbal) can build in volume from almost inaudible to an overwhelming climax in a satisfyingly smooth manner (as in Humperdinck's Mother Goose Suite). The edge of a suspended cymbal may be hit with the shoulder of a drum stick to obtain a sound somewhat akin to that of clash cymbals. Other methods of playing include scraping a coin or triangle beater rapidly across the ridges on the top of the cymbal, giving a "zing" sound (as some percussionists do in the fourth movement of Dvořák's Symphony No. 9). Other effects that can be used include drawing a bass bow across the edge of the cymbal for a sound like squealing car brakes.

=== Ancient cymbals ===
Ancient, antique or tuned cymbals are much more rarely called for. Their timbre is entirely different, more like that of small hand-bells or of the notes of the keyed harmonica. They are not struck full against each other, but by one of their edges, and the note given in by them is higher in proportion as they are thicker and smaller. Berlioz's Romeo and Juliet calls for two pairs of cymbals, modeled on some old Pompeian instruments no larger than the hand (some are no larger than a large coin), and tuned to F and B flat. The modern instruments descended from this line are the crotales.

=== List of cymbal types ===
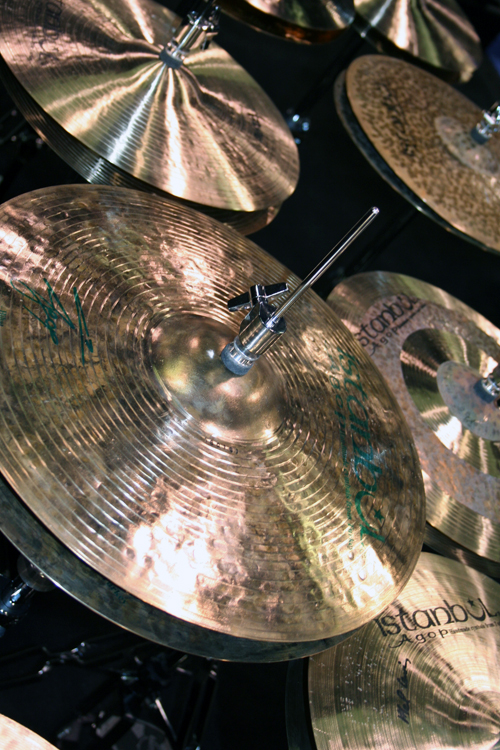
Hi-hats. The clutch suspends the top cymbal on a rod operated by a pedal.

Cymbal types include:

- Bell cymbal
- China cymbal
- Clash cymbal
- Crash cymbal
- Crash/ride cymbal
- Finger cymbal
- Flat ride cymbal
- Hi-hat
- Ride cymbal
- Sizzle cymbal
- Splash cymbal
- Swish cymbal
- Suspended cymbal
- Taal – Indian cymbal (clash cymbal)

== Cymbal alloys ==
Cymbals are made from four main alloys, all of them copper-based. These are: bell bronze, malleable bronze, brass, and nickel silver.

=== Bell bronze ===
Bell bronze, also known as bell metal, is the traditional alloy used for cymbals, many gongs, and, as the name suggests, bells. It is normally stated to be one part tin to four parts copper, that is 20% tin, and this is still the most common formula, but there has always been some variation. Larger and smaller bells are cast with differing amounts of tin, and some bell, gong, and cymbal makers use small but significant amounts of other elements, notably silver, gold, and phosphorus. Bell bronze is a two-phase alloy, meaning some of the tin is not dissolved in the copper grains but exists between them. This makes the metal harder and more brittle than a single-phase alloy, and also affects the way the metal responds to hardening by hammering and lathing, and greatly restricts the use of mechanised techniques of manufacture. Major orchestras generally use bell-bronze cymbals, which are commonly used by drum kit players.

=== Signature Bronze Alloys ===
In 1989 Paiste released professional cymbal series composed of sheet metal bronze with about 15% tin. Though the manufacturing requires the metal to be rolled hot at certain stages, it is not tempered like traditional B20 cymbals but annealed. Using this alloy allows for greater consistency between blanks compared to traditional cymbal alloy, and is more applicable to Paiste's 2002 production methods. Examples include Paiste Signatures, Traditionals and Dark Energy. Paiste calls this Signature Bronze or Sound Formula. For a time, Paiste produced no bell metal cymbals, but now produces high-end cymbals of both this alloy and bell bronze. Since then, other manufactures followed the lead and implemented lines of high tin sheet metal alloy. Zildjian Project 391 series employed Paiste alloy explicitly, however many companies (Zildjian included) produce cymbals with B12 (Such as Zildjian ZHT, now S series) and B10 alloys. Meinl cymbals also employ both alloys.

There is some evidence that a similar sheet alloy was used by the Hammerax company (though with added iron and nickel).

=== Malleable bronze ===
Malleable bronze is an alloy of tin and copper containing typically 8% tin. It is a single-phase alloy and can be cold rolled into sheets, unlike bell bronze. It is readily available as commercial sheet metal in many grades and thicknesses.

Cymbal bronzes containing 8% tin are most normally called B8 alloy. Paiste refer to their 8% tin bronze as 2002 alloy.

From the mid 20th century there were attempts to make top-quality cymbals from malleable bronze, originally for reasons of economy. As the Paiste patent referred to above says:

Less than three decades ago experiments were carried out for economical considerations with a commercial common bronze sheet or plating containing 8% tin by weight. The result was that the old bronze rule was confirmed and proven to be correct. One had to realize that with careful working and processing of the cymbal it was possible to achieve considerable qualitative results with the bronze sheet or plating containing 8% by weight tin, but these results could never approach the results obtained with traditional cymbals having a tin content of 20% by weight.

Not everyone agrees with this unfavourable assessment, written well after the development of the Paiste 2002 series. In particular, malleable bronze cymbals proved suitable for the louder music then developing. Some manufacturers claim their malleable bronze cymbals rival bell bronze in quality.

Examples of malleable bronze cymbals include: Harpy H, Meinl One of a Kind, Meinl Custom and Amun, Meinl Lightning and Raker, Meinl Classics and some Generation X, Meinl Trooper and Cadet, Orion Solo Pro and Solo Pro Master, Orion Viziuss, Paiste 2002 and Giant Beat, Paiste 802 and Alpha, Paiste 502 and some Exotic Percussion, Pearl Pro, Meinl MCS, Sabian B8 and B8 Pro, Sabian Pro, Sabian Pro Sonix, Sabian APX, Sabian B8X, Soultone Custom Brilliant, Soultone Extreme, Soultone Natural, Soultone Vintage, Soultone Vintage OldSchool 1964, Soultone Gospel, UFIP Tiger, UFIP Supernova, Zildjian I Series, ZBT, ZXT, ZHT, and the sonic "XXX" series by Krash Cymbalz, a B10 alloy line for the heavy-handed, aggressive drummer.

=== Brass ===
Some traditional gongs and china-type cymbals and nearly all zills are made from brass. However, it is not widely used in cymbals. Brass cymbals are inexpensive beginners' cymbals, not meant to last long; the rigidity of brass yields cymbals harsh in sound and very prone to cracks at the bell hole and the border.

Many of the "show" cymbals provided by many drum kit manufacturers for use in shop window displays are also made from brass. These tend to be lower in tonal quality.

The brass for cymbals is about 38% zinc in copper, which is very easily worked, readily available as sheet metal, and easily the cheapest metal stock normally used for cymbals. The tone of brass cymbals tends to be warm but dull compared to any sort of tin bronze.

Examples of brass cymbals include: Harpy B, Meinl Marathon M38, Meinl Meteor, Meinl HCS, Orion Twister, Paiste 101, Paiste 302 and some Exotic Percussion, Pearl, Royal, Twister Series by Orion, Solar and Sbr by Sabian, Soultone Intro, UFIP M8, Planet Z by Zildjian. Nearly all zils of all makes are also made out of brass.

=== Nickel silver ===
Nickel silver as used in cymbal making is an alloy of copper and nickel, and an alloy with about 12% nickel is used for some beginners' cymbals. A very few specialised high-quality cymbals are also made from nickel silver, as are some top-quality gongs tending to the more modern and exotic sounds.

Some maintain that the term nickel silver should only be used for alloys containing an appreciable content of zinc, and would call this cymbal alloy nickel bronze instead, but the use of the term nickel silver for all cymbal bronzes with nickel as the main alloying metal is well established.

Nickel silver is malleable and available as commercial sheet metal, and gives a bright tone but without the shimmer and sensitivity of tin bronzes. In the early to mid 20th century nickel alloy cymbals were far more widely produced and used, and so many older recordings were probably made using cymbals with a significant nickel content.

Evelyn Glennie has used the tonal characteristics of nickel silver cymbals.

Examples of nickel silver cymbals include: Some Foremost, Meinl Streamer and Marathon N12, Paiste 402, the original 1970s Paiste 101 (current 101s are Brass) and some Exotic Percussion, Sabian Signature Glennies Garbage, and some Zilco.

=== Other metals ===
Cymbals have also been made from silicon and aluminum bronzes but these alloys have not become generally popular.

Meinl FX9 is an alloy of 69% copper, 15% manganese, 15% zinc and 1% aluminium, and was used for the new Meinl Generation X line released in 2003. Previous Generation X models were made from malleable bronze. FX9 is described by Meinl as not being a bronze at all, and was previously described by their sales literature as containing tin rather than zinc. There is a minority view that the word "bronze" should be reserved for two-phase alloys, which may be their usage here.

Unlike cymbals, some gongs are made from several different metals fused together. Many different metals have been used. Parts of some traditional gongs, notably the bosses of some "nipple" gongs, are made from iron based alloys.

A few independent cymbal makers have also used stainless steel and titanium to produce cymbals and gongs.

== List of cymbal series and the alloys used in production ==
	Alloy							
Manufacturer	B20 Bronze (Note: Also known as CuSn20 or 602 Bronze by Paiste.) (80% copper, 20% tin)	B18 Bronze (82% copper, 18% tin)	B15 Bronze (Note: Also known as Proprietary Signature Bronze by Paiste.) (85% copper, 15% tin)	B12 Bronze (Note: Also known as Pure Alloy by Meinl.) (88% copper, 12% tin)	B10 Bronze (90% copper, 10% tin)	B8 Bronze (Note: Also known as CuSn8 or 2002 Bronze by Paiste.) (92% copper, 8% tin)	Nickel Silver (Note: Also known as NS12 .) (88% copper, 12% nickel)	Brass (Note: Also known as MS63 Alloy by Meinl.) (usually 63% copper, 37% zinc)
Zildjian	Avedis Zildjian Series A Series A Custom Series K Series K Custom Series Kerope Series FX Series Re-Mix Series Z Series Z Custom Series Z3 Series		Project 391 Series	Pitch Black Series S Series ZHT Series		Edge Series Impulse Series I Series Scmitar Series ZBT Series ZXT Series ZXT Titanium Series	Planet Z Series (2014 - 2019)	Planet Z Series (2019 - present)
Sabian	AA Series AAX Series Artisan Series B20 by Sabian Series FRX Series HH Series HHX Series Paragon Series Stratus Series XSR Series XS20 Series					APX Series B8 Series B8X Series B8 by Sabian Series B8 Plus Series B8 Pro Series		SBR Series
Paiste	Formula 602 Series Sound Creation Series Super Formula 602 Series Masters Series Twenty Series Twenty Custom Collection Series		Signature Series Signature Precision Series Signature Reflector Series Sound Formula Series Visions Series (combination of B15 and B8 alloys)			201 Series 400 Series 404 Series 500 Series 502 Series 502 Plus Series 505 Series 802 Series 802 Plus Series 900 Series 1000 Series 1000 RUDE Series 2000 Series 2002 Series 3000 Series Alpha Series Black Alpha Series Black Alpha II Series Colorsound 5 Series Dimentions Series Dixie Series (c. 1971 - 1978) Giant Beat Series Innovations Series PST 5 Series PST 7 Series PST 8 Series PST X Series RUDE Series Super Series (c. 1973 - 1978) Stambul Series (c. 1971 - 1978) Ludwig Stanople Series (c. 1971 - 1973) Stambul65 Series Visions Series (combination of B8 and B15 alloys)	101 Series (1979 - discontinued in 1985) 402 Series Dixie Series (1963/1964 - c. 1971) Standard Series Super Series (1964 - c. 1973) Stambul Series (possibly late 1930s - c. 1971) Ludwig Stanople Series (1966 - c. 1971) Zilko Standard Series	101 Series (revived in 2005 - present) 200 Series 302 Series 302 Plus Series Brass-Tones Series PST 3 Series Zilko Series
Meinl	Artist Concept Models Series (Some models) Artist Design Series Byzance Series Candela Series Dragon Series Mb20 Series M-Series Series M-Series Custom Series Symphonic Series	Marathon B18 Series		Artist Concept Models Series (some models) Classics Custom Series Pure Alloy Series Pure Alloy Custom Series Soundcaster Series Soundcaster Custom Series Soundcaster Fusion Series	Classics Custom Series (Originally) Mb10 Series	Classics Series Designer Series HCS Bronze Series Headliner Bronze Series Laser Series Lightning Series Livesound Series Mb8 Series MCS Series Meteor Turbo Series Profile Series Raker Series Reference Class Series	Marathon N12 Series Sterling Series Streamer Series	BCS Series HCS Series Headliner Brass Series Marathon M38 Series Meteor Series
Stagg	Genghis Series Myras Series Sensa Series SH Series					EX Series		AXK Series

== See also ==
- Cymbal making and Cymbal alloys
- Cymbal manufacturers
- Percussion instruments
- Drum and Drum kit
- Taal
- Zill
