= Zill =

Small metallic cymbals

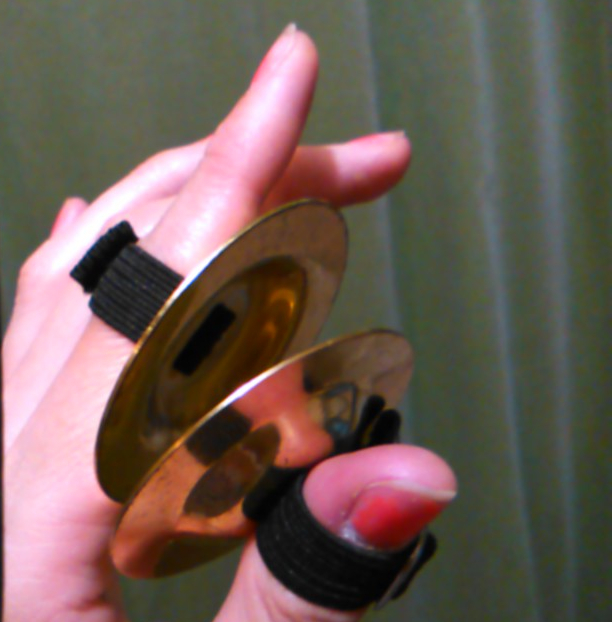
- A close-up of a person holding zills (traditionally, it would be held on the middle finger instead of the pointer, and above the last knuckle)

Percussion instrument
- Other names: Zils; finger cymbals; sagat; zagat; zillia; fanglesnaps
- Classification: Percussion
- Hornbostel–Sachs classification: 111.142 (Concussion or percussion vessels)

Related instruments
- Castanets; Crotalum; crotales

Sound sample

Zills, zils, or sagat, also known as finger cymbals, are small metallic cymbals used in belly dancing and similar performances. They are similar to Tibetan tingsha bells. In Western music, several pairs can be set in a frame to make a tambourine.

Other names include nuqaisāt (after the naqus) and ṣunnūj ṣaghīra in Arabic, sanj angshati in Persian, zil in Turkish.

== History ==
Zills, or finger cymbals, are part of a family of musical instruments known as clappers. Clappers are musical instruments made of wood, bone, metal, and other substances that are played by being struck against each other. Clappers come in pairs and are often held in the hands, fastened together, or strapped to the performer's fingers. The clapper family also includes spoons, bones and castanets.

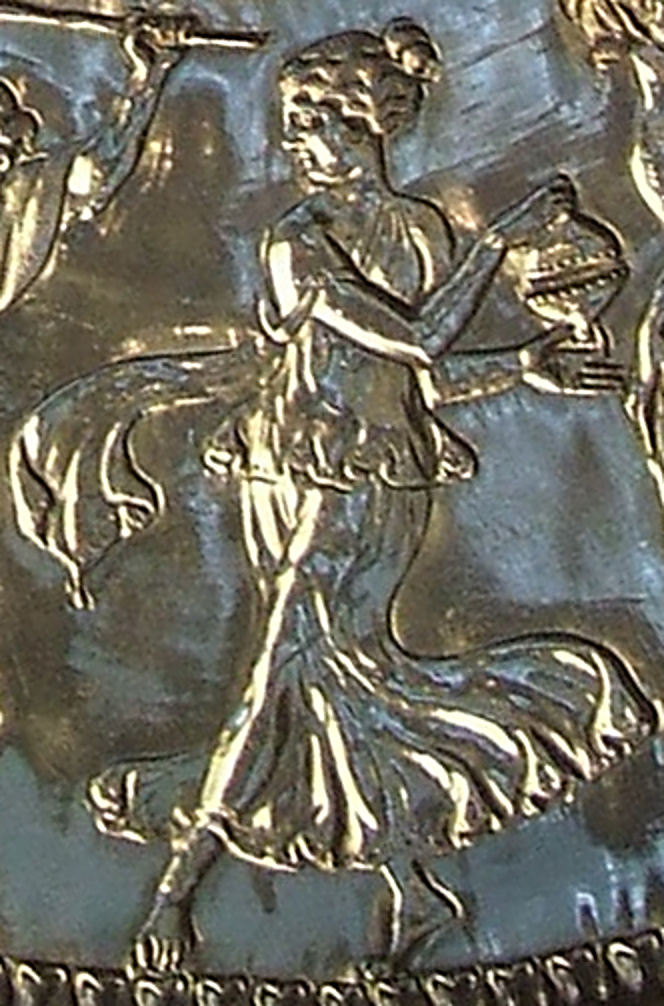
4th century A.D. relief of Greek dancer with cymbals. Roman artwork from Mildenhall Treasure. Modern dancers use varieties of zills, finger cymbals or castanets.

One of the earliest forms of clappers are wooden krotala already present in Greece around 500 BC. Ancient Greek potteries depict men and women celebrating at Dionysian festivals, some of them playing krotala. From known representations, ancient Greeks used metallic cymbals, but they held only one cymbal in each hand and clapped them together to strike them. The finger cymbal practice appears in representations from the Roman Empire period. Examples of mosaics and stone reliefs showing Roman finger cymbal players come from Bulgaria, Italy and Belgium, and are dated between the second and fourth century CE. It is not known whether the finger cymbal practice was continuous or was forgotten and then reinvented much later in the Middle East. At least, it is clear that the tradition of dancers with different types of clappers continued through the Middle Ages. First representations of "modern" finger cymbal players in Egypt and Ottoman Empire date from the 18th century at the latest.

Zills are one of the main percussive elements of Middle Eastern belly dancing. The use of zill in belly dancing is particularly present in the Ghawazi, a line of hereditary dancers. Zills are also important in some rituals of Egyptian culture. Finger cymbals are used in the Sufi religious music. They are also used in the zaar, a healing ritual utilizing rhythmic songs and dances meant to soothe Jinn, a form of magically empowered spirit beings. Dancers use the zill to find a rhythm that soothes the spirits, which then becomes the rhythm performed by the ensemble.

While the tradition of finger cymbals spans centuries, their use in the Middle East showcases distinct regional styles. In Egypt, sagat are a key element of raqs sharqi (oriental dance), where skilled dancers employ them to emphasize intricate movements, creating a rhythmic interplay with live percussion. Roman dance, performed by Romani communities in Ottoman Empire, features sagat in a more dynamic, improvisational style, often accompanying upbeat folk melodies. Beyond traditional settings, sagat have found a place in modern fusion genres, blending Arabic rhythms with jazz, electronica, and other global influences, highlighting their adaptability and continued cultural significance.

== Features ==
A set of zills consists of four cymbals, two for each hand. Zills come in a range of sizes, the most common having a diameter of about 5 cm (2 in). Different sizes and shapes of zills will produce sounds that differ in volume, tone and resonance. For instance, a dancer performing with an orchestra will use a larger zill with more volume, whereas many belly dancers may use a zill with a more delicate sound, depending on the venue and whether their music is live or recorded, amplified or acoustic. American Tribal dancers typically use a much larger zill with a more mellow tone.

Zill manufacturers commonly use brass rather than the bronze used for larger cymbals, and may design their own brass alloys specifically to achieve particular sound qualities. They may plate some zills in order to give a specific color to them. Zills vary in appearance and may be shiny, dull, plain or engraved.

Before the invention of elastic, zills were tied onto the fingers with leather strips. Modern cymbalists use elastic to secure the zills, one to the thumb and one to the middle finger of each hand. Many zills have two slots to allow the threading of the elastic through the zill, allowing greater control of the instrument. Others have a single hole, allowing greater wobble and creative use with speed.

Zills played as idiophones (two on each hand) can be played in many ways to produce a wide and subtle range of sound, from quiet clicking, bell-like ringing, muted cupped sounds, loud clacks, and even a small range of pitch change. Zills belong to the family of instruments used in Ottoman military bands, and also occasionally appear as part of Western orchestral or other musical performances. In these cases, musicians usually just call them finger cymbals and use them to obtain a ringing sound with "Middle Eastern" associations. Percussionists who are not exclusively cymbalists sometimes play finger cymbals by striking one cymbal with a drumstick, or by holding one cymbal in each hand by gripping the strap between the thumb and the index finger, and striking the rims together. They tend to use zills for occasional flourishes in the music rather than for complex rhythms and sounds. For more intricate rhythms, an orchestral player might attach a cymbal to both his thumb and first finger. Then, placing that hand between his other hand and knee, the player will alternate between striking the knee and the opposite hand. Each of the motions produce one articulation of the cymbals.

There are many rhythms in belly dancing music that can be spelled out in finger cymbal playing. The style of playing varies from one style and era of dance to the next.

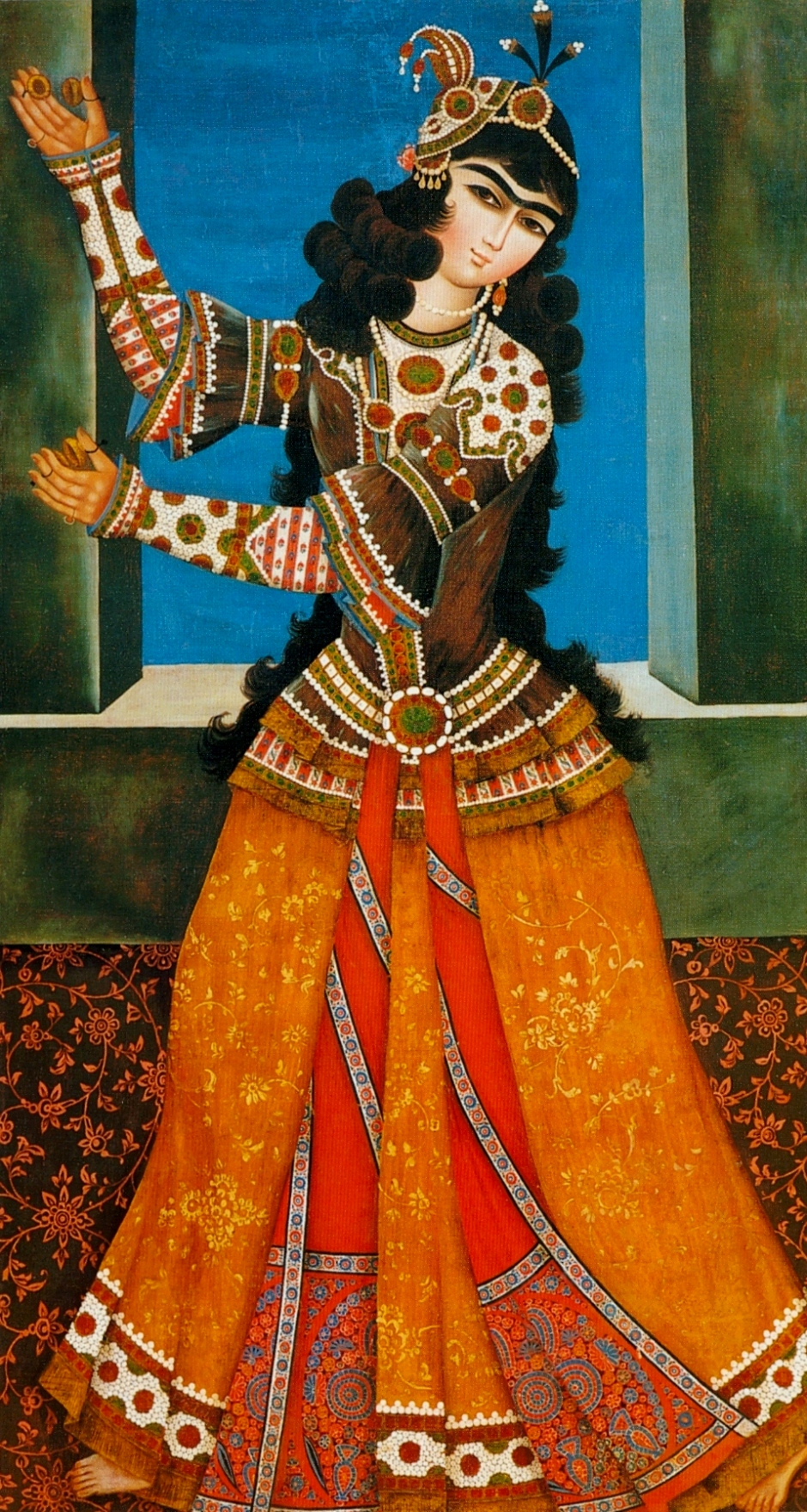
- Dancing girl playing Zills from Qajar Era.
  Triples, not to be confused with triplets: left/right/left/pause – “giddyup, giddyup, giddyup”)
- Quads: L/R/L/R (no pause)
- Beledi: dum/dum/tek-a-tek/dum-tek-a-tek
- Chiftatelli: dum/dum/tek-a-tek/dum/dum/dum – “John went to the sea; caught. three. fish.”
- Ayoub: dum/a-tek-tek – “buy more shoes, and…buy more shoes, and . . .”
- Bolero: dum/tek-a-tek-tek/dum/dum/dum/dum – “I want to be a belly dancer”
- In the count of the beat, the gallop is played as "and a ONE, and a TWO..." It can also be played as right/left/right/rest. Many teachers recommend thinking of it as dominant hand / non-dominant hand / dominant hand / rest.

Zills are also used in Sufi music, and may be played arrhythmically in a lyrical flow of sound for meditations and sound healing.

== See also ==
- Music of Turkey
- Castanets
- Khartal
- Cymbal
- Tingsha

== Sources ==
- "The American Heritage Dictionary entry: Zill". The American Heritage Dictionary of the English Language. Houghton Mifflin Harcourt. 2017.
- Peinkofer, Karl; Tannigel, Fritz (1988) [1976]. Handbook of percussion instruments : their characteristics and playing techniques, with illustrations and musical examples from the literature. Mainz / London: Schott. OCLC 604102910.
