= New Brunswick Route 555 =

Highway in New Brunswick, Canada

Coordinates: 46.145113°N 67.691746°W

Route 555

Route information
- Maintained by New Brunswick Department of Transportation

Major junctions
- East end: Route 103 in Woodstock
- West end: Route 95 in Houlton–Woodstock Border Crossing

Location
- Country: Canada
- Province: New Brunswick

Highway system
- Provincial highways in New Brunswick; Former routes
← Route 550	→ Route 560

Route 555 is a 11.8-kilometre (7.3 mi) long east–west secondary highway in the western portion of New Brunswick, Canada.

The route starts at Route 103 (Houlton Road) in Woodstock east of Trans-Canada Highway exit 188. The road travels west passing Southern Carleton Elementary School in Bedell, and then passes through Campbell Settlement and Richmond Corner before crossing Route 540. The last stretch of the highway passes by Irish Settlement before ending at Route 95 near the Houlton–Woodstock Border Crossing. Here, Route 95 continues into Maine as Interstate 95.

The original Route 555 was designated in 1965 as a renumbering of Route 6 from Route 106 at Florenceville-Bristol to the Maine border. In 1958, it extended east to Route 130, replacing part of Route 106 as the remainder of Route 106 was transferred to Routes 103 and 130. Route 555 was renumbered Route 110 in 1970. This original road was New Brunswick Highway 5 until 1976.
