= Orient–Fosterville Border Crossing =

Canada–United States border crossing

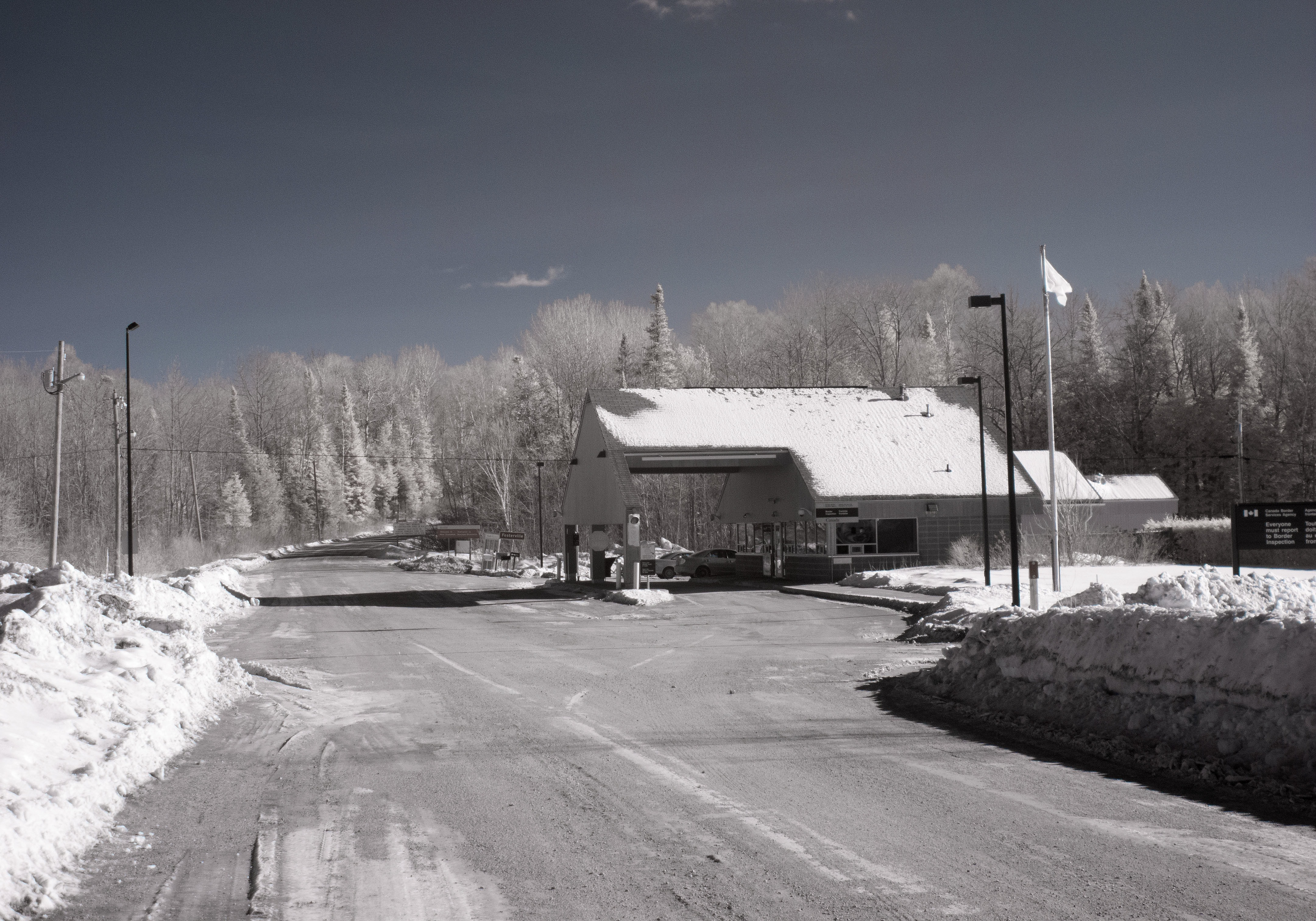
- The Canada Border Inspection Station at Fosterville, New Brunswick

Location
- Country: United States; Canada
- Location: Route 122 / Boundary Road / Boundary Bridge; US Port: 632 Boundary Road, Orient, ME 04741; Canadian Port: 4575 Route 122, Fosterville NB E6H 2B6
- Coordinates: 45.81674305290214°N 67.78050810098648°W

Details
- Opened: 1930

Website
- Official Canadian website; Official US website
- U.S. Inspection Station-Orient, Maine
- U.S. National Register of Historic Places
- MPS: U.S. Border Inspection Stations MPS
- NRHP reference No.: 14000557
- Added to NRHP: September 10, 2014

The Orient–Fosterville Border Crossing is an international border crossing between the towns of Orient, Maine, United States and Fosterville, New Brunswick, Canada on the Canada–US border. At this crossing, the United States is still operating the original border station built in 1937, which was listed on the National Register of Historic Places in 2014. Canada built its current border station in 1986. This section of the border is a series of lakes and streams that supply the St Croix River. The original bridge connecting Orient with Fosterville was said to be the shortest international bridge between the US and Canada.

== Canadian facilities ==
The Canadian government built a border station here in about 1930. The current station was built in 1986.

The Canadian facilities operate 7 days a week but with reduced hours from September to May. Canadian Services include an Export Reporting Office, Seaplane Airport of Entry, Reporting Site for Marine Private Vessel, Non-Terminal Office, and Highway/Land Border Office.

The Canadian station handles about 30 cars every day.

== United States facilities ==
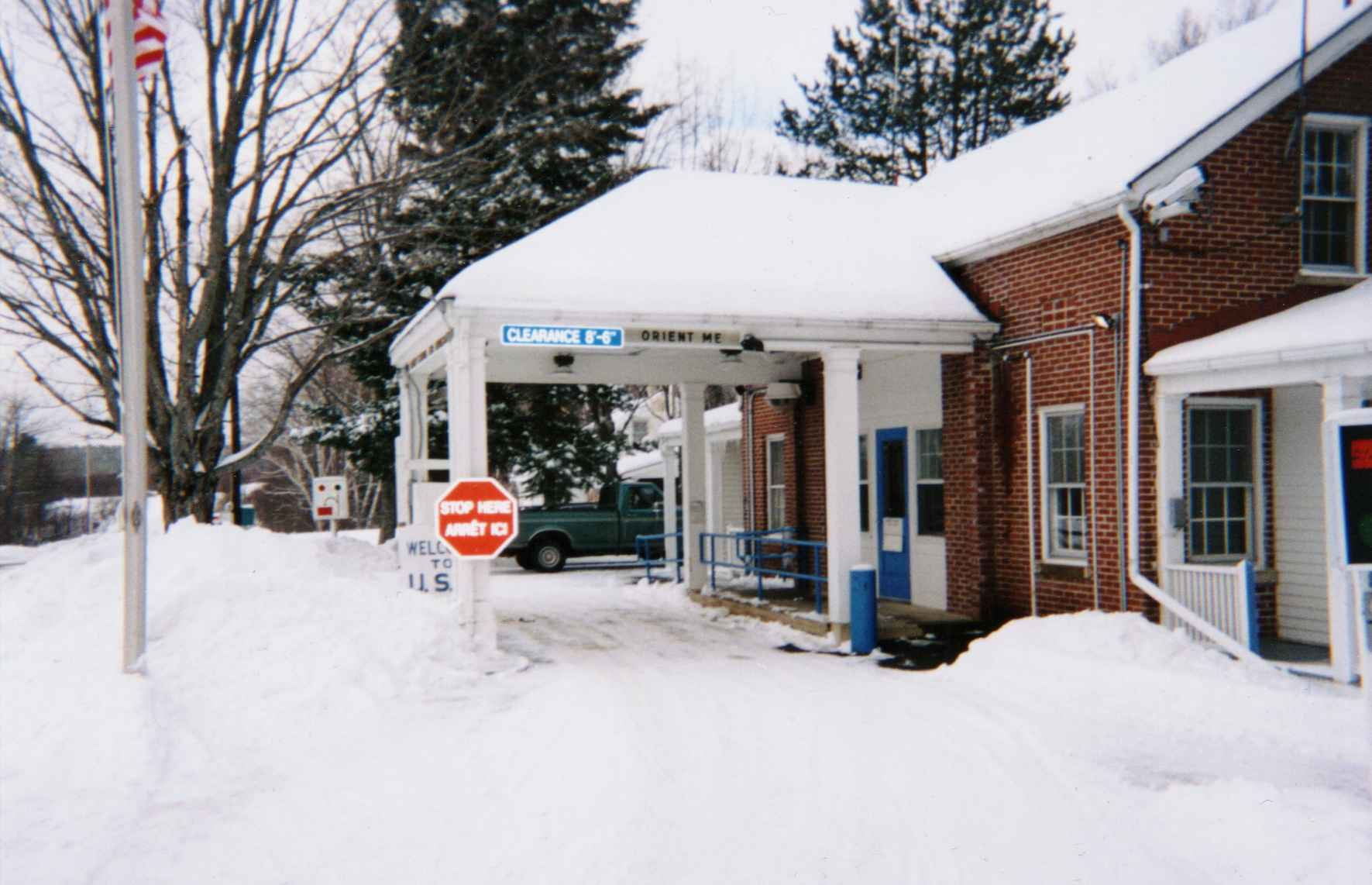
US Border Station at Orient, Maine

The United States facility is located on the north side of Boundary Road. The main building is a 1 1/2-story brick-faced Colonial Revival structure, with a side-gable roof and a projecting one-lane hip-roofed porte-cochere. The porte-cochere is supported by Classical Revival squared columns, with matching pilasters at the building front. Stylistically similar wood-frame single-story wings extend the building to either side; that on the left houses restrooms, that on the right offices. The interior of the main building is symmetrically organized, with customs on one side and immigration on the other. A small garage, dating to the same period as the main building, stands to the northwest.

Prior to the construction of this station, customs and immigration formalities would have taken place in the nearest town. With the advent of increased automobile traffic in the 1920s, as well as the need to interdict the movement of contraband liquor due to Prohibition, the federal government realized the need for border stations where immigration formalities and vehicle inspections could be performed close to the border, and consequently planned the construction of a series of such stations. This building, built in 1937, is the least-altered of Maine's surviving early border stations. It was built to a standard "Type 1" plan, one of three built on the Canada–US border, and is the only one of those still in use in Maine. Others of this style are still in operation in other states, including Morses Line, Vermont, and Alburg Springs, Vermont.

== See also ==
- List of Canada–United States border crossings
- National Register of Historic Places listings in Aroostook County, Maine
