= New Brunswick Route 6 =

There have been two highways in New Brunswick numbered Route 6:

- New Brunswick Route 6 (1927-1965), now Route 110
- New Brunswick Route 6 (1965-1984), now Route 106

== See also ==
- List of New Brunswick provincial highways
- Provincial archives of New Brunswick recorded circa June 30, 1971 formally route 6. Driving through; River glade, Salisbury, Moncton, Dieppe, Sackville... F3900 - NB Rte 6 - 1971 PANB | APNB
