= New Brunswick Route 103 =

Highway in New Brunswick, Canada

Route 103

Route information
- Maintained by New Brunswick Department of Transportation
- Length: 42.21 km (26.23 mi)
- Existed: 1965–present

Major junctions
- North end: Route 110 in Florenceville
- Route 2 (TCH) in Somerville
- South end: Route 2 (TCH) / Route 95 / Route 555 near Bedell

Location
- Country: Canada
- Province: New Brunswick
- Major cities: Somerville, Upper Woodstock

Highway system
- Provincial highways in New Brunswick; Former routes
← Route 102	→ Route 104

Route 103 is a highway in New Brunswick, Canada, running from Woodstock to Florenceville along the west bank of the Saint John River, a distance of 42 kilometres.

Route 103 begins at the interchange between the Trans-Canada Highway and Route 555 and passes the eastern terminus of Route 95, where it connects the interchange to downtown Woodstock and Interstate 95 via the Houlton Road. The route turns north along Main Street, following the Saint John River bank. At Somerville, a feeder road off Route 103 leads to the longest covered bridge in the world, connecting to the town of Hartland. The route ends at an intersection with Route 110 in Florenceville.

Until 2001, Route 103 began south of Woodstock at a former Trans-Canada intersection at Bulls Creek, but with a new twinned section of the highway opening and a small part of Route 2 being abandoned, Route 103 was shortened to end in Woodstock. A new highway, Route 165, now uses the former Trans-Canada from Lakeland Ridges to Bulls Creek and the former Route 103 routing to downtown Woodstock.

== Major Intersections ==
County	Location	km	mi	Destinations	Notes
Carleton				Route 110 to Route 2 (Trans-Canada Highway) / Route 130 – Centreville, Florenceville-Bristol	Northern terminus
Carleton	Somerville			Route 130 to Route 2 (Trans-Canada Highway) – Florenceville-Bristol	
Carleton	Somerville			To Route 130 – Hartland	Turn here for the Hartland Covered Bridge
Carleton				Route 560 north to Route 2 (Trans Canada Highway) – Jacksonville	
Carleton	Woodstock			Route 585 east to Route 105 – Grafton, Millville	
Carleton	Woodstock			Route 550 north	
Carleton	Woodstock			Route 165 south	
Carleton				Route 2 (Trans-Canada Highway) / Route 95 / Route 555 west – Fredericton, Edmundston, Houlton	Interchange; southern terminus
1.000 mi = 1.609 km; 1.000 km = 0.621 mi

== See also ==
- List of New Brunswick provincial highways
