= New Brunswick Route 540 =

Highway in New Brunswick

Route 540

Route information
- Maintained by Department of Transportation and Infrastructure
- Length: 54.8 km (34.1 mi)

Major junctions
- South end: Route 122 in Graham Corner
- Route 555 near Richmond Corner; Route 95 near Richmond Corner
- North end: Route 550 near Lindsay

Location
- Country: Canada
- Province: New Brunswick
- Counties: York, Carleton

Highway system
- Provincial highways in New Brunswick; Former routes
| ← Route 535 | → Route 550 |

Route 540 is a 54.8-kilometre (34.1 mi) long provincial highway located in western New Brunswick, Canada. The highway begins in Graham Corner at a junction with Route 122 and travels north to a terminus at Route 550 in Lindsay.

== Route description ==
Route 540 begins in Graham Corner, near Eel River Lake, and travels north through rural woodlands in northern York County, passing through the community of Maxwell, and by Belle Lake. The highway continues north, into Carleton County and the community of Kirkland, where the woodlands give way to farmland. The highway's first junction with another numbered highway occurs south of Richmond Corner, with Route 555, then just north of Richmond Corner with Route 95, which provides access to Maine and to Woodstock and the Trans-Canada Highway. Past Route 95, the highway continues through several small communities and rural farmland, before turning east near Oakville. The highway comes to an end in Lindsay at an intersection with Route 550.

== Major intersections ==
| County | Location | km | mi | Destinations | Notes |
|---|---|---|---|---|---|
| York | Graham Corner | 0.0 | 0.0 | Route 122 to US 1 – Orient, Me, Lakeland Ridges | Southern terminus |
| Carleton | Richmond Corner | 36.2 | 22.5 | Route 555 – Irish Settlement, Woodstock | |
| Carleton | Richmond Corner | 37.4 | 23.2 | Route 95 to I-95 / Route 2 (TCH) – Houlton, Me, Woodstock | Interchange |
| Carleton | Lindsay | 54.8 | 34.1 | Route 550 – Hartford, Tracey Mills | Northern terminus |
1.000 mi = 1.609 km; 1.000 km = 0.621 mi
