= Fosterville, New Brunswick =

Rural community in New Brunswick, Canada

Coordinates: 45°48′15.9″N 67°45′59.6″W

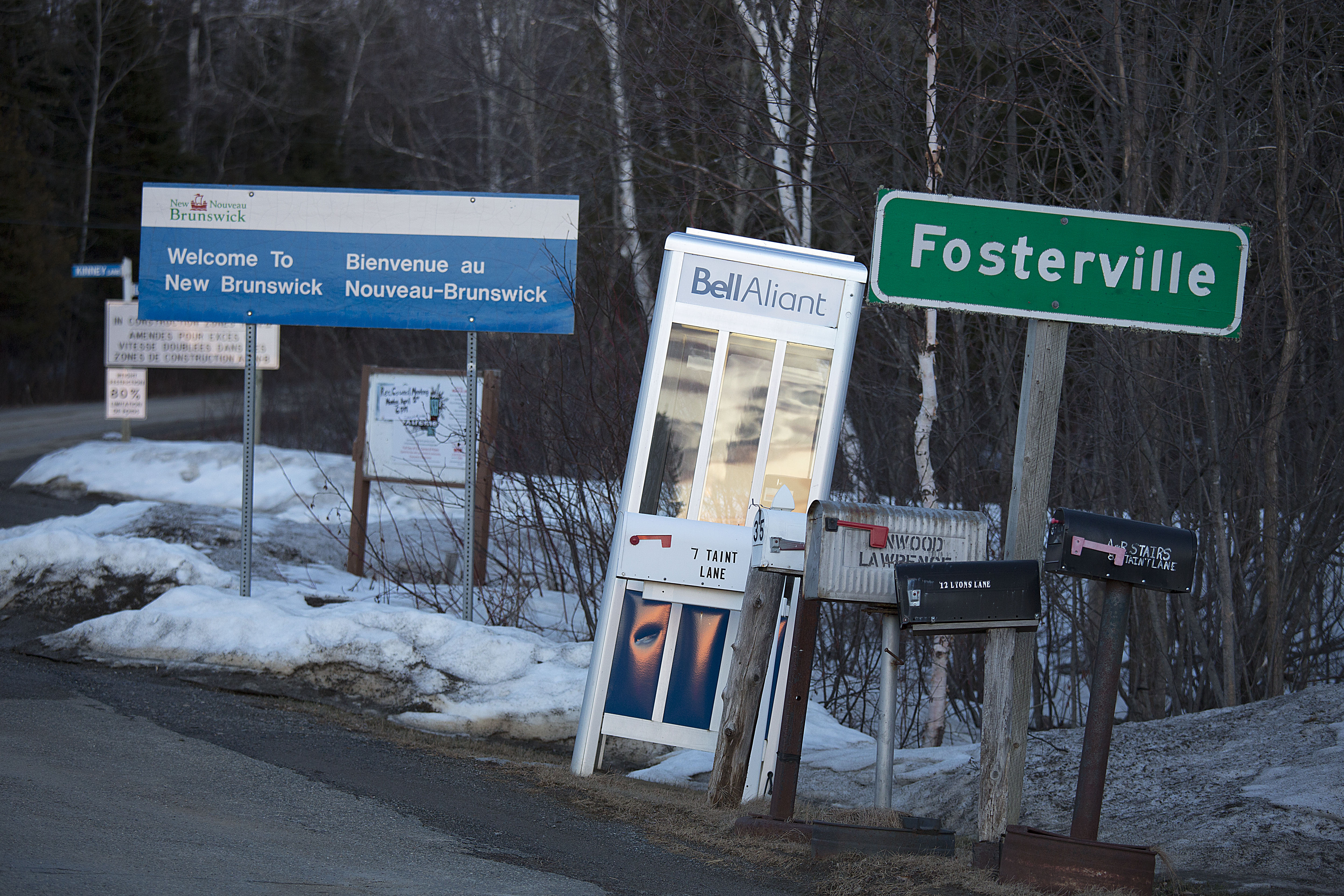
Fosterville welcome sign from the Orient–Fosterville Border Crossing

Fosterville is a rural community located in western York County, New Brunswick, Canada, mainly on Route 122

Situated on the Canada–United States border in the parish of North Lake, Fosterville has a small population but is popular in the summer months with cottage owners from the state of Maine and surrounding areas in New Brunswick. The local Fire Department is also based in Fosterville as well as a church.

== History ==
The community was home to a school up until the late 1980s when it was closed by the New Brunswick Department of Education. The building was taken over by the community and turned into a community centre. In 2004 the building was removed and replaced with a new, modern structure to meet the needs of the parish.

On November 26, 1924 two young girls from the town were murdered in their half-uncle's cabin. Darius Thornton, who changed his name to Harry D. Williams to evade his ex-wife, shot both of the girls in the head. Thornton had served in the Canadian military for four years, and was well liked by the community. It is believed that Thornton had a strong interest in the older of the two girls.

== See also ==
- List of communities in New Brunswick
