= New Brunswick Route 560 =

Highway in New Brunswick, Canada

Coordinates: 46.385307°N 67.700844°W

Route 560

Route information
- Maintained by New Brunswick Department of Transportation
- Length: 53.9 km (33.5 mi)

Major junctions
- North end: Route 130 in River de Chute
- Route 2 (TCH) near Woodstock
- South end: Route 103 in Woodstock First Nation

Location
- Country: Canada
- Province: New Brunswick

Highway system
- Provincial highways in New Brunswick; Former routes
← Route 555	→ Route 565

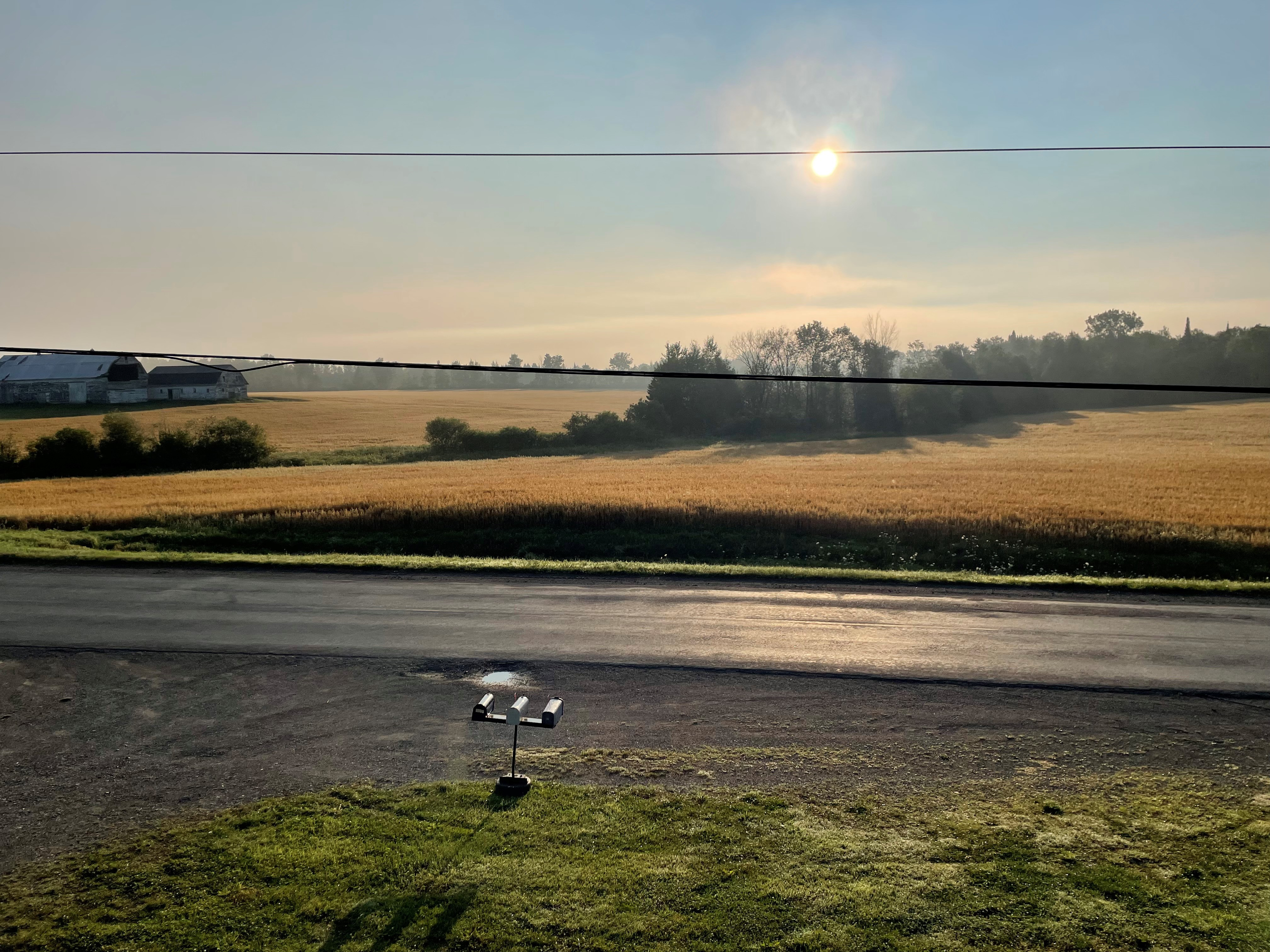
Oatfields near Route 560, New Brunswick, Canada

Route 560 is a 53.9-kilometre-long (33.5 mi) north–south secondary highway in the western portion of New Brunswick, Canada.

The route starts at Route 130 in River de Chute east of the Trans-Canada Highway following the Rivière des Chutes. The road travels west crossing the Trans-Canada Highway and continues through a mostly forested area towards the Canada–US border before turning south and passing through Listerville, Upper Knoxford, Knoxford, McGrath Corner, and Orchards Corner. It then enters Centreville where the road is known as Main Street. The road then crosses Route 110 before continuing south through Bradley Corner, Lakeville, Avondale Road, Deerville, Jacksontown, and Jacksonville. Route 560 crosses the Trans-Canada Highway again and then meets the southern terminus of Route 590. It passes exit 184 of the Trans-Canada Highway before ending at Route 103 in Upper Woodstock.
