= New Brunswick Route 550 =

Highway in New Brunswick, Canada

Coordinates: 46.309351°N 67.754574°W

Route 550

Route information
- Maintained by New Brunswick Department of Transportation

Major junctions
- North end: Route 110 in Tracey Mills
- Route 2 (TCH) near Woodstock
- South end: Route 103 in Woodstock

Location
- Country: Canada
- Province: New Brunswick

Highway system
- Provincial highways in New Brunswick; Former routes
| ← Route 540 | → Route 555 |

Route 550 is a 30-kilometre (19 mi) long north–south secondary highway in the northwest portion of New Brunswick, Canada.

The route starts at Route 103 (Main Street) in Woodstock on the banks of the Meduxnekeag River and the Saint John River. Until the intersection with New Brunswick Route 2, the Trans-Canada Highway, Route 550 is known as Connell Street. It then leaves the Woodstock commercial area and continues northeast, passing through Hartford, Briggs Corner, Lindsay, Lower Bloomfield, Bloomfield, and Carvell. The road turns east at Digby Corner, and takes a sharp turn to the north in Good Corner. The road then continues northeast towards the Canada–US border, passing through Long Settlement and Snow Settlement. The road ends at Route 110 in the community of Tracey Mills.
