= Interstate 95 =

U.S. East Coast Interstate Highway

Interstate 95
- I-95 highlighted in red

Route information
- Length: 1,905.96 mi (3,067.35 km)
- Existed: August 14, 1957–present
- History: Completed on September 22, 2018
- NHS: Entire route

Major junctions
- South end: US 1 in Miami, FL
- I-10 in Jacksonville, FL; I-16 in Pooler, GA; I-20 in Florence, SC; I-40 in Benson, NC; I-85 / US 460 in Petersburg, VA; I-64 through Richmond, VA; I-76 in Philadelphia, PA; I-80 in Teaneck, NJ; I-87 in New York City; I-90 in Weston, MA
- North end: Route 95 at the Houlton–Woodstock Border Crossing in Houlton, ME

Location
- Country: United States
- States: Florida, Georgia, South Carolina, North Carolina, Virginia, District of Columbia, Maryland, Delaware, Pennsylvania, New Jersey, New York, Connecticut, Rhode Island, Massachusetts, New Hampshire, Maine

Highway system
- Interstate Highway System; Main; Auxiliary; Suffixed; Business; Future

Interstate 95 (I-95) is the main north–south Interstate Highway on the East Coast of the United States, running from U.S. Route 1 (US 1) in Miami, Florida, north to the Houlton–Woodstock Border Crossing between Maine and the Canadian province of New Brunswick. The highway largely parallels the Atlantic coast and US 1, except for the portion between Savannah, Georgia, and Washington, D.C., and the portion between Portland and Houlton in Maine, both of which follow a more direct inland route.

I-95 serves as the principal road link between the major cities of the Eastern Seaboard. Major metropolitan areas along its route include Miami, Jacksonville, and Savannah in the Southeast; Richmond, Washington, Baltimore, Wilmington–Philadelphia, Newark, and New York City in the Mid-Atlantic; and New Haven, Providence, Boston, and Portland in New England. The Charleston, Wilmington, and Norfolk–Virginia Beach metropolitan areas, the three major coastal metros bypassed by the highway's inland portion, are connected to I-95 by I-26, I-40, and I-64, respectively.

I-95 is one of the oldest routes of the Interstate Highway System. Many sections of I-95 incorporated preexisting sections of toll roads where they served the same right-of-way. Until 2018, there was a gap in I-95's original routing in Central New Jersey caused by the cancelation of the Somerset Freeway. An interchange between the Pennsylvania Turnpike and I-95 was completed on September 22, 2018; this allowed I-95 to be rerouted along the Pearl Harbor Memorial Turnpike Extension of the New Jersey Turnpike into Pennsylvania, creating a continuous Interstate route from Maine to Florida for the first time.

With a length of 1,906 miles (3,067 km), I-95 is the longest north–south Interstate and the sixth-longest Interstate Highway overall. I-95 passes through 15 states (as well as a brief stretch in the District of Columbia while crossing the Potomac River), more than any other Interstate. According to the US Census Bureau, only five of the 96 counties or county equivalents along its route are completely rural, while statistics provided by the I-95 Corridor Coalition suggest that the region served is "over three times more densely populated than the U.S. average and as densely settled as much of Western Europe". According to the Corridor Coalition, I-95 serves 110 million people and facilitates 40 percent of the country's gross domestic product.

== Route description ==
Lengths
	mi	km
FL	381.90	614.61
GA	111.80	179.92
SC	198.76	319.87
NC	181.36	291.87
VA	178.25	286.87
DC	0.13	0.21
MD	110.01	177.04
DE	23.43	37.71
PA	41.53	66.84
NJ	89.23	143.60
NY	23.50	37.82
CT	111.57	179.55
RI	43.30	69.68
MA	91.95	147.98
NH	16.13	25.96
ME	303.11	487.81
Total	1,905.96	3,067.35

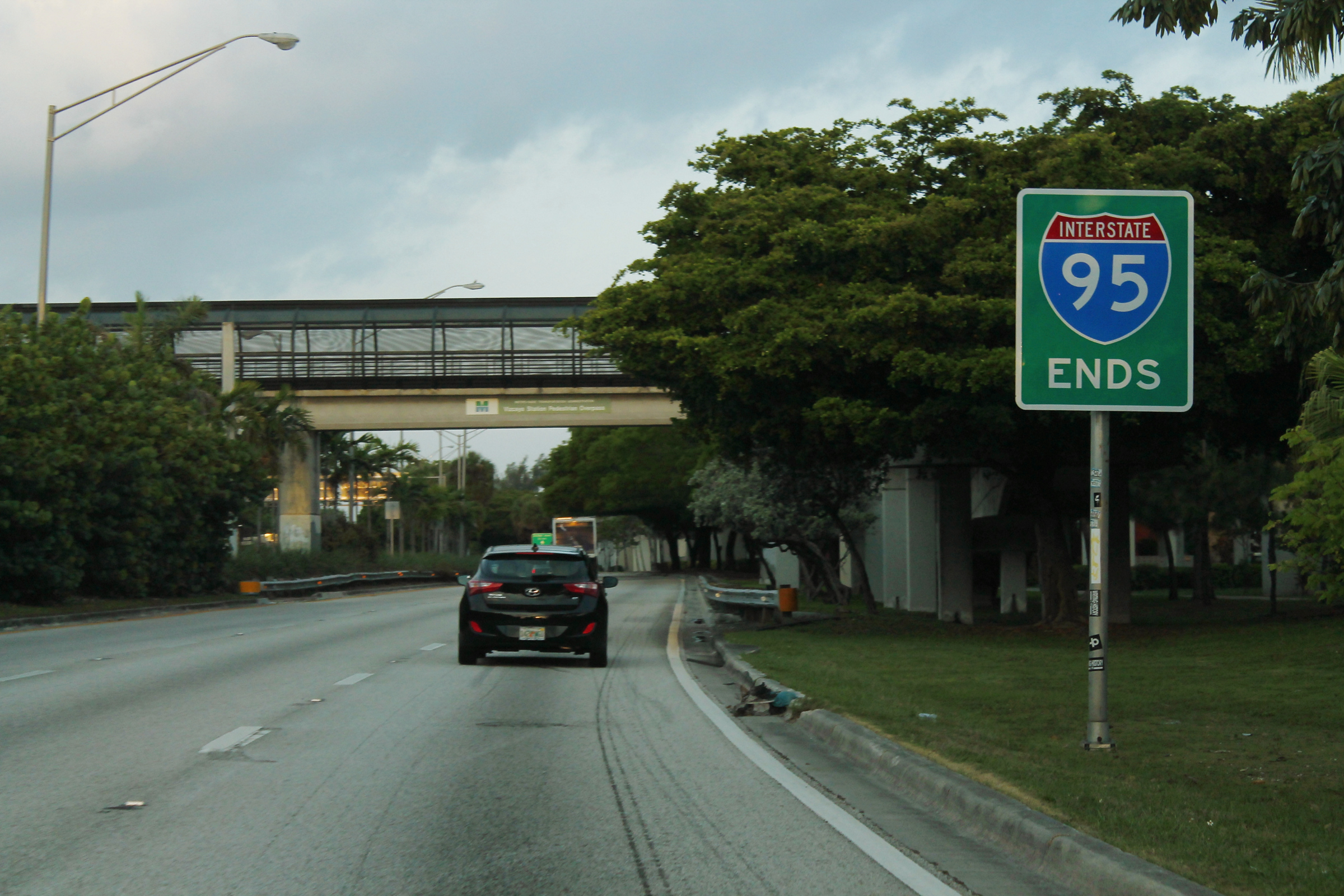
End of I-95 southbound at US 1 in Miami, Florida

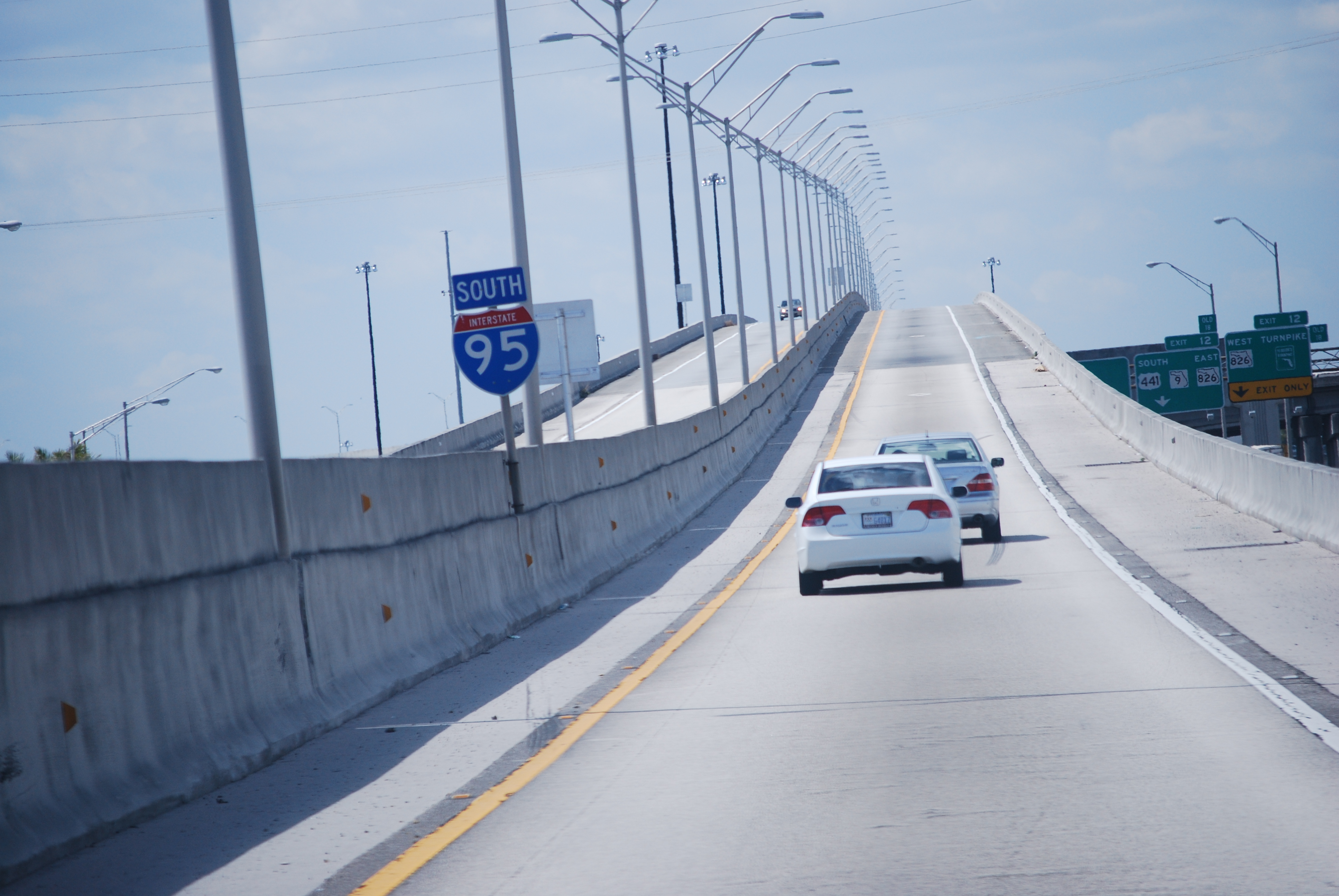
I-95 express lane near Miami, Florida

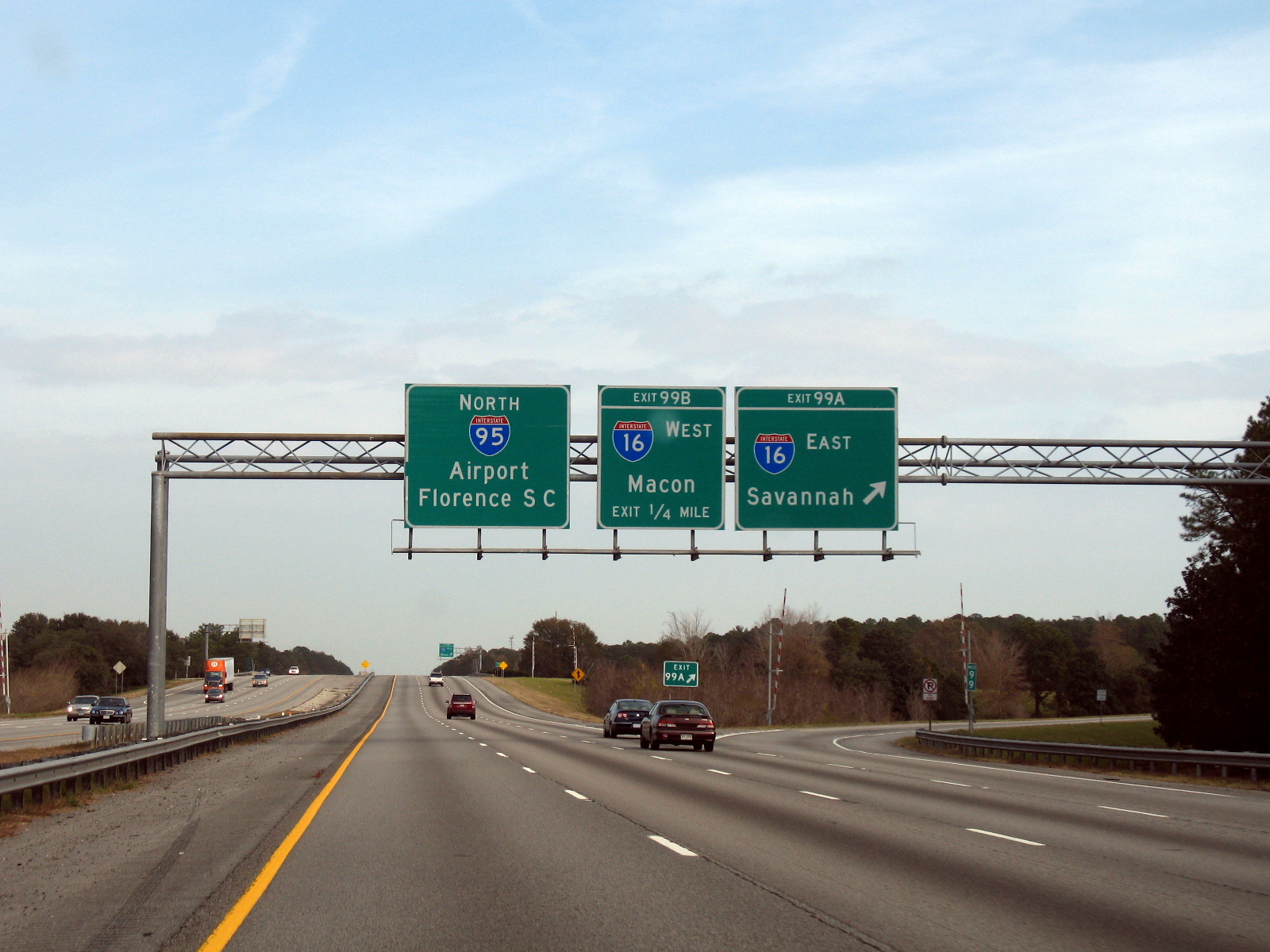
Northbound I-95 at the interchange with I-16 near Savannah, Georgia

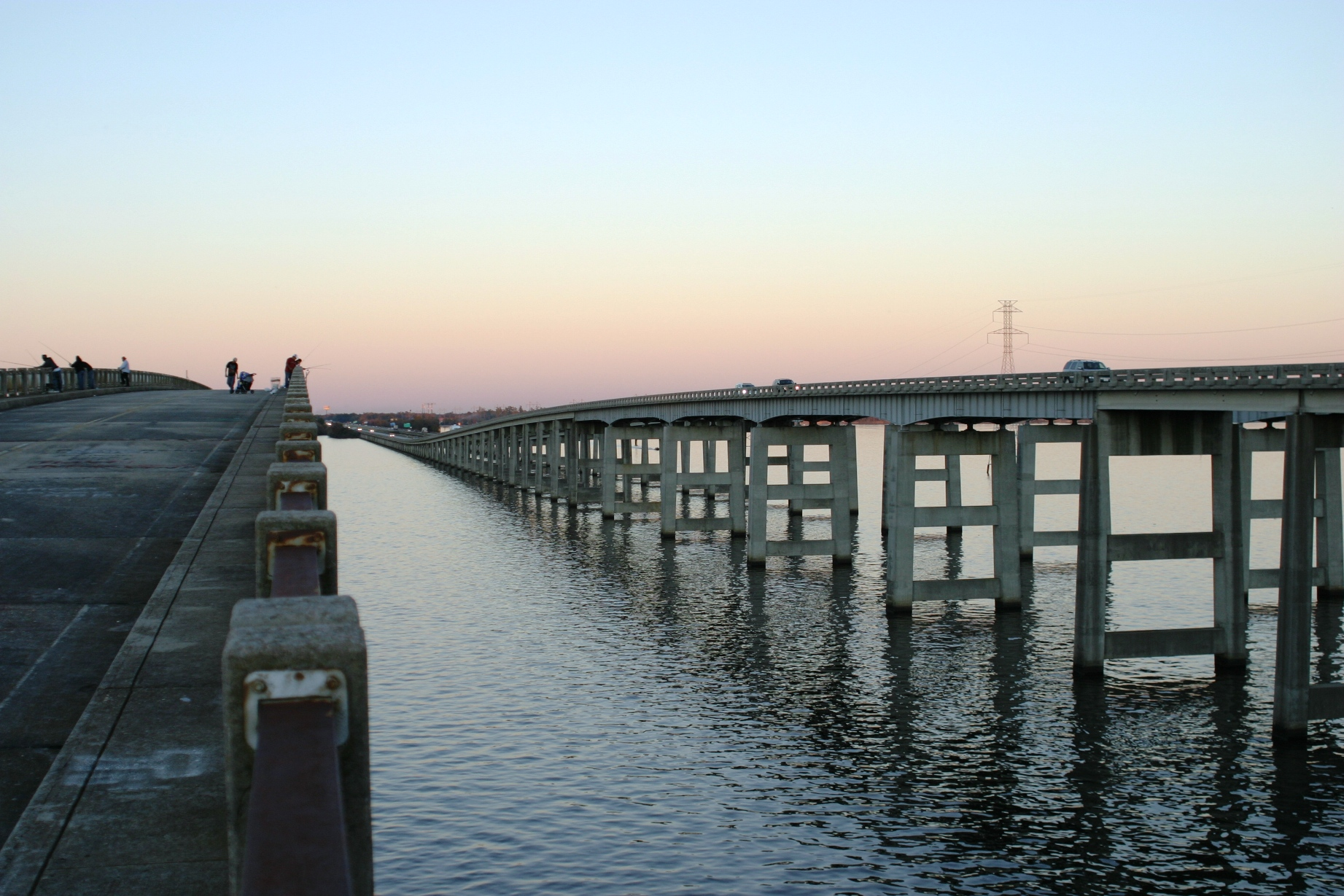
I-95 bridge over Lake Marion, Santee, South Carolina; the old bridge (on the left) was abandoned and converted to a fishing pier, but is now closed even to pedestrian traffic.

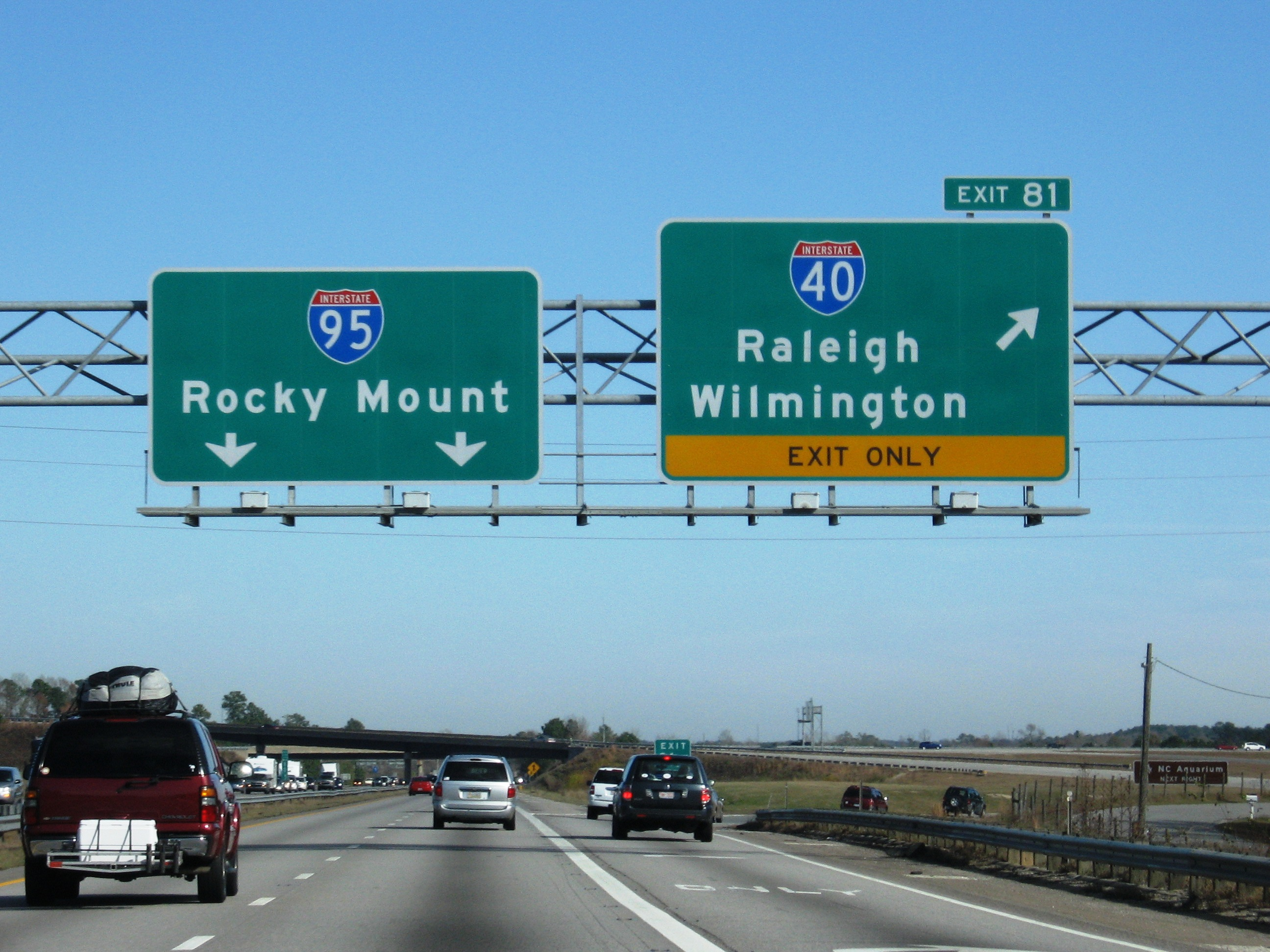
Northbound I-95 at its interchange with I-40 near Benson, North Carolina, c. 2009. This interchange has since been renovated.

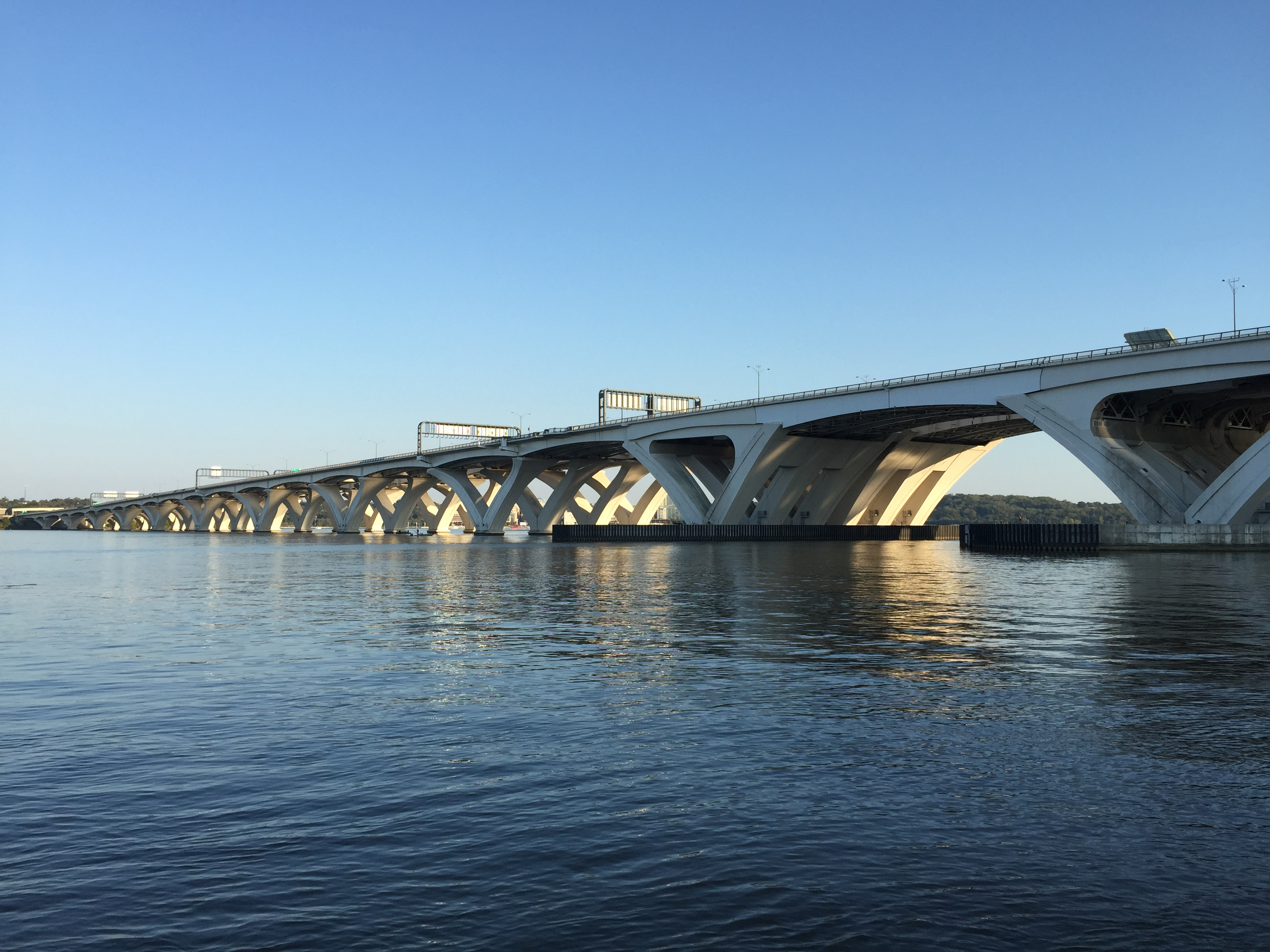
The Woodrow Wilson Bridge carrying I-95/I-495 across the Potomac River, Alexandria, Virginia

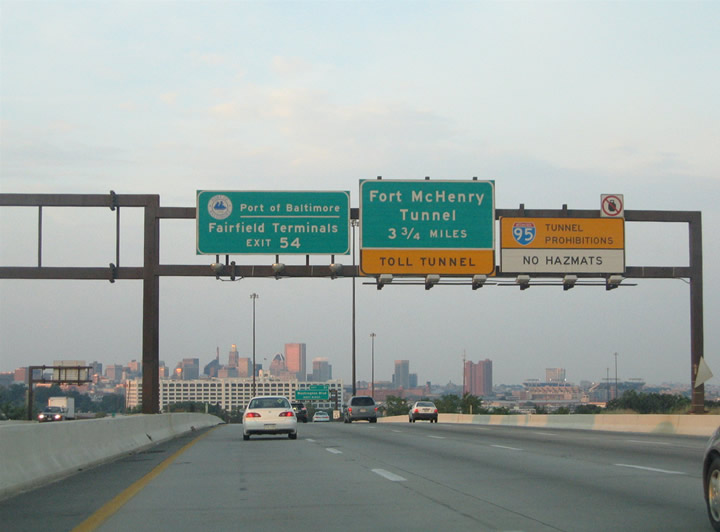
I-95 northbound at Washington Boulevard, Baltimore, Maryland

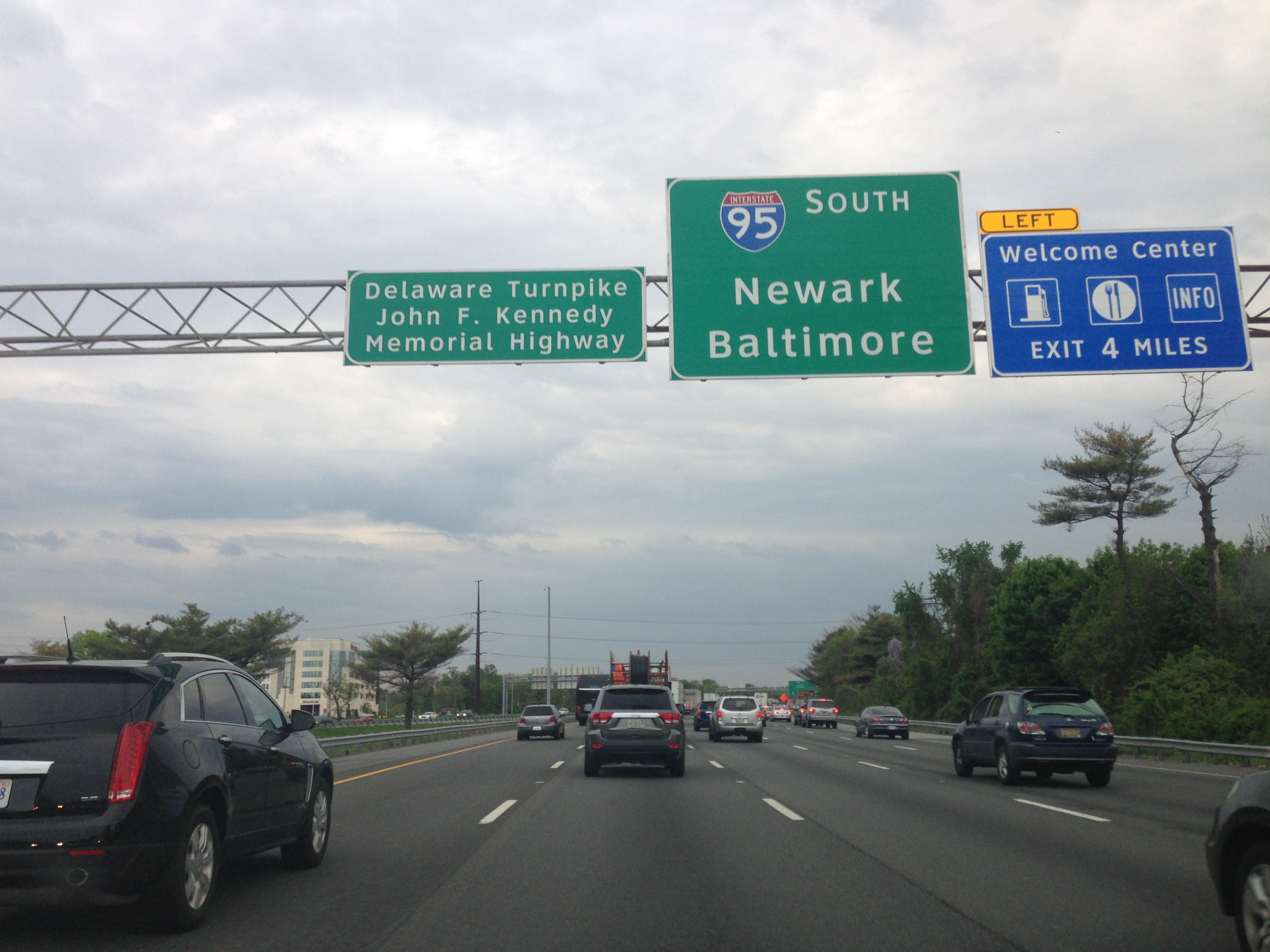
I-95 southbound on the Delaware Turnpike south of Wilmington, Delaware

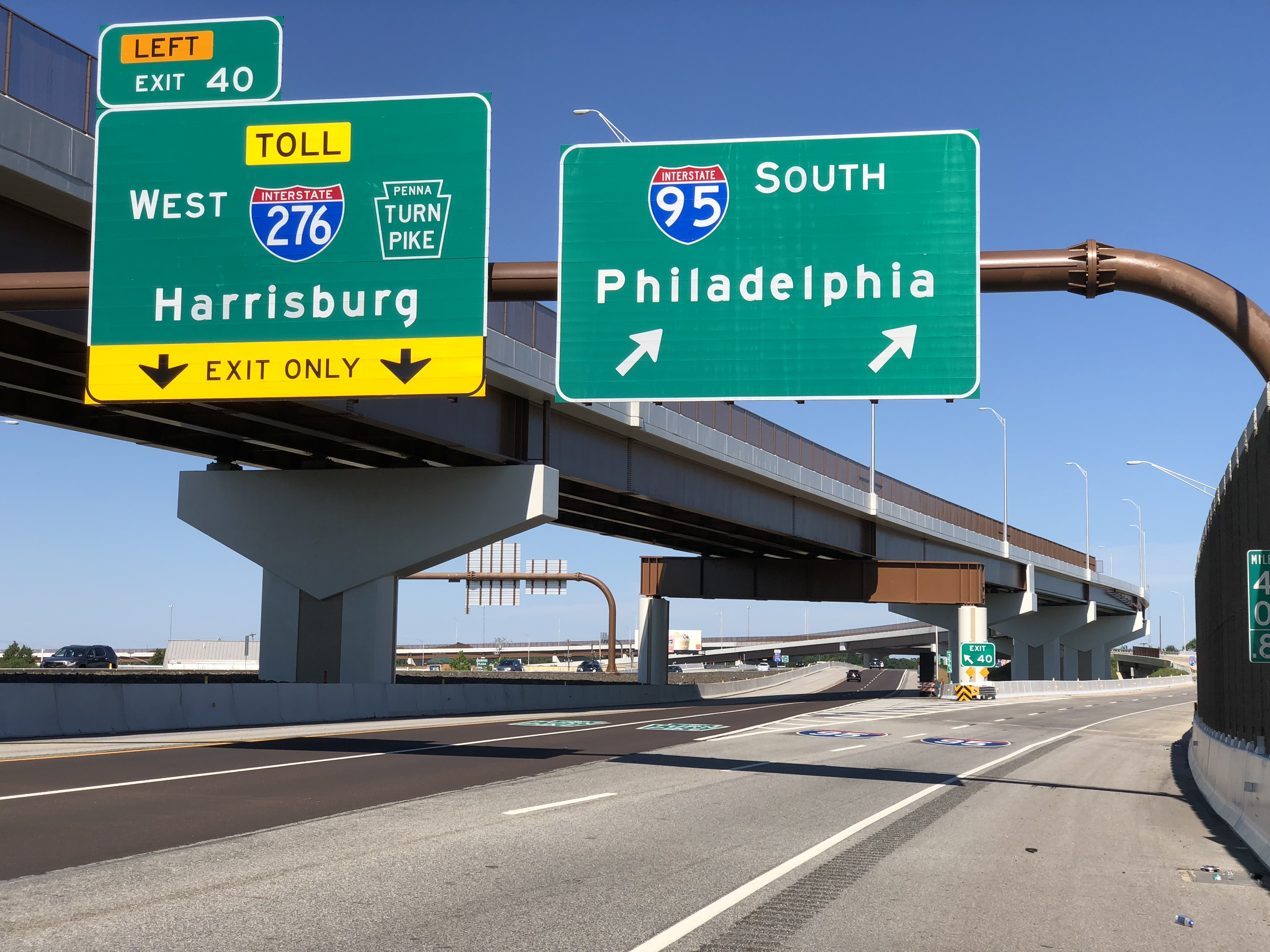
I-95 southbound at the interchange with the Pennsylvania Turnpike in Bristol Township, Bucks County, Pennsylvania

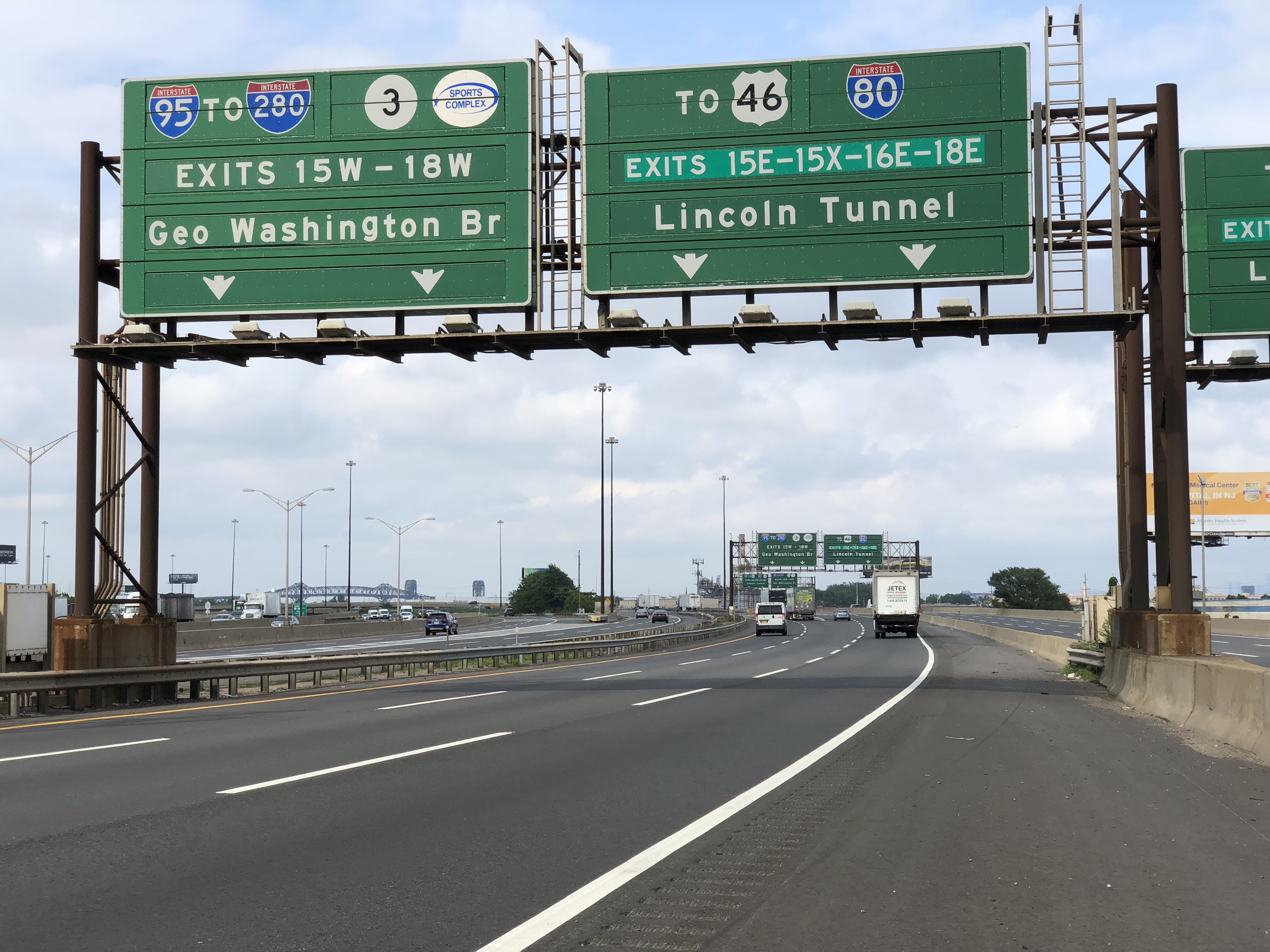
I-95 splits into the Eastern and Western spurs of the New Jersey Turnpike

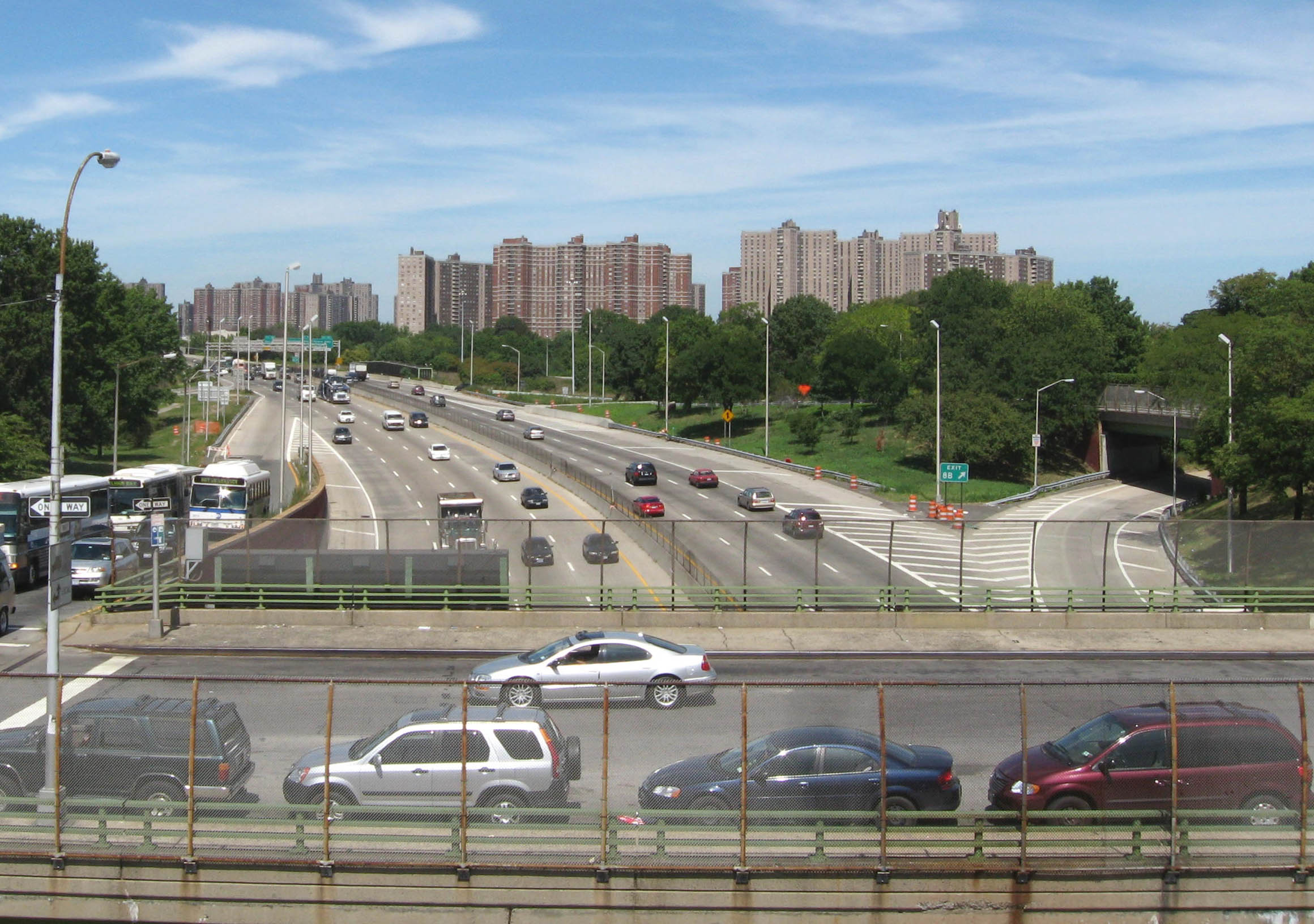
A view of I-95 (Bruckner Expressway) from the overpass at Westchester Avenue, the Bronx, New York City, New York

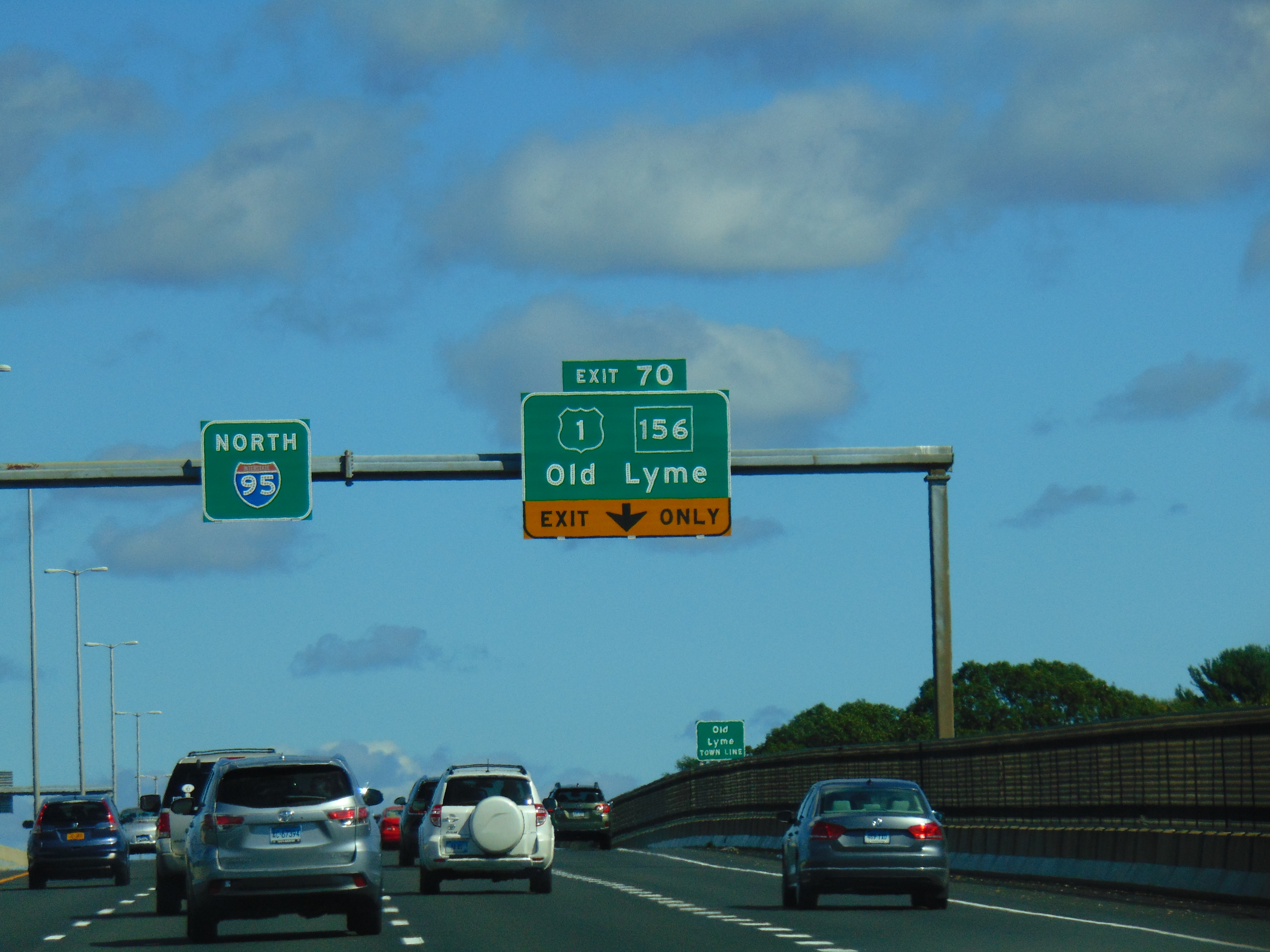
I-95 crossing the Connecticut River in Old Saybrook–Old Lyme, Connecticut

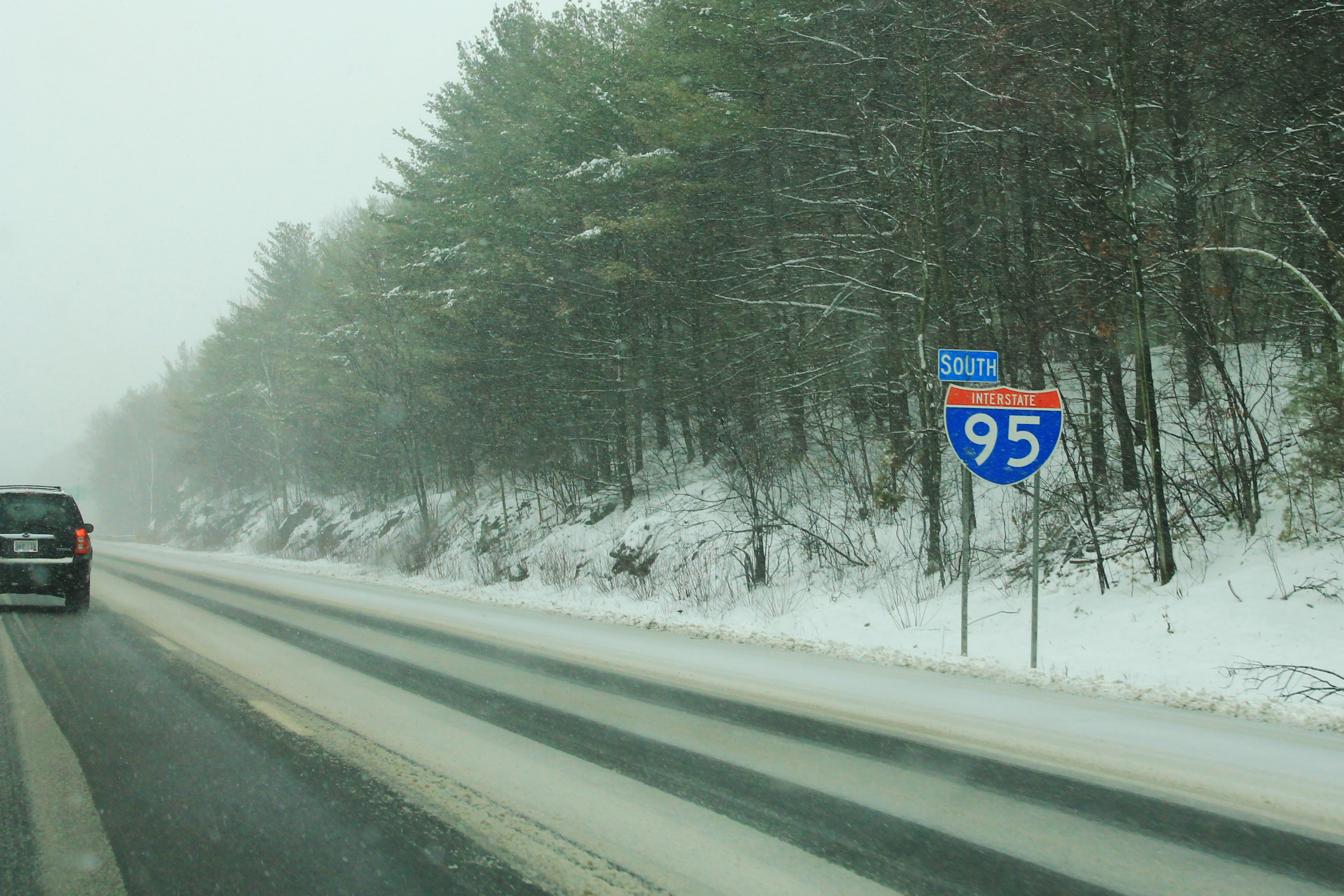
I-95 southbound just south of Foxborough, Massachusetts

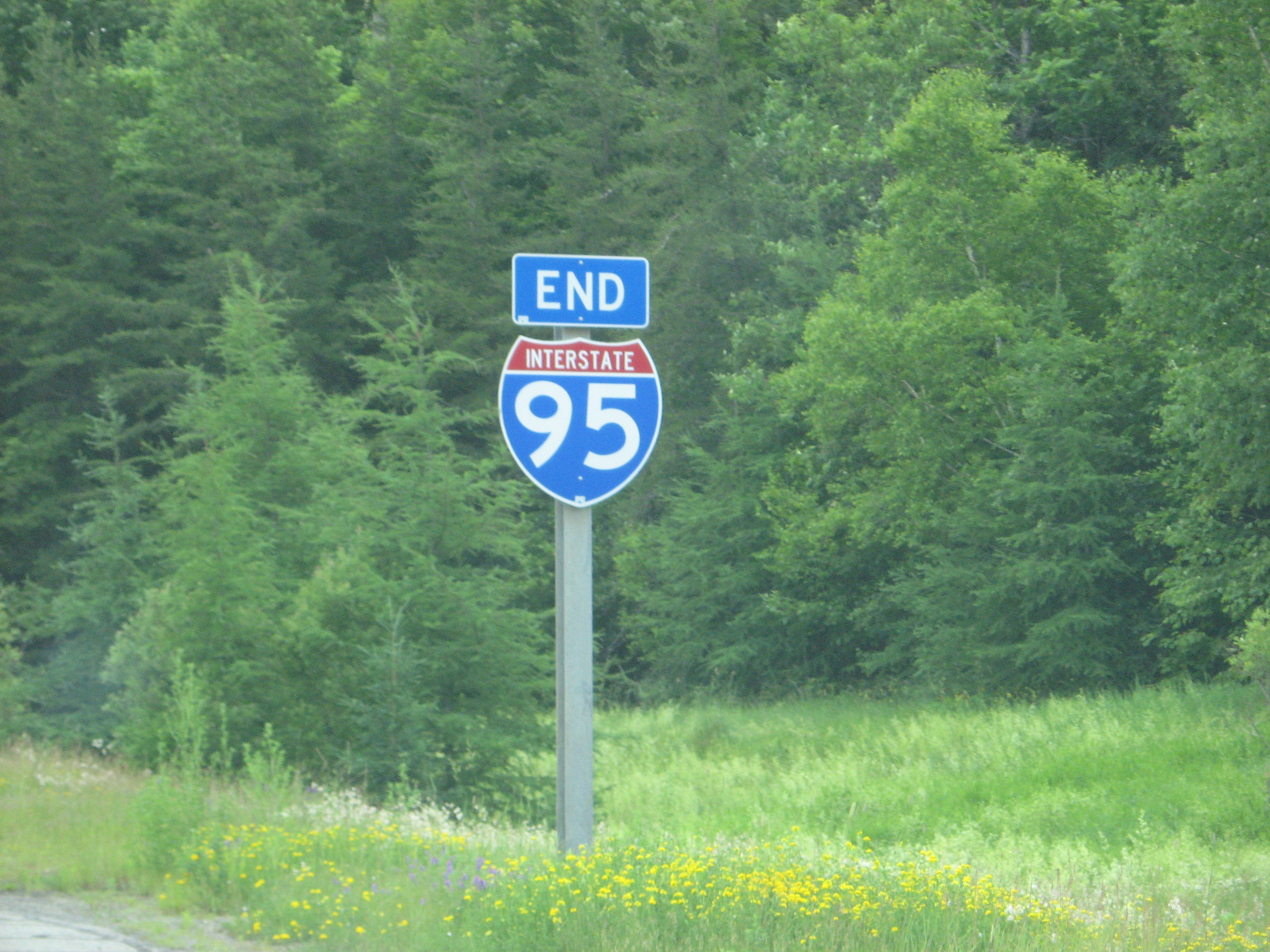
End of I-95 northbound approaching the Houlton–Woodstock Border Crossing at the Canadian border

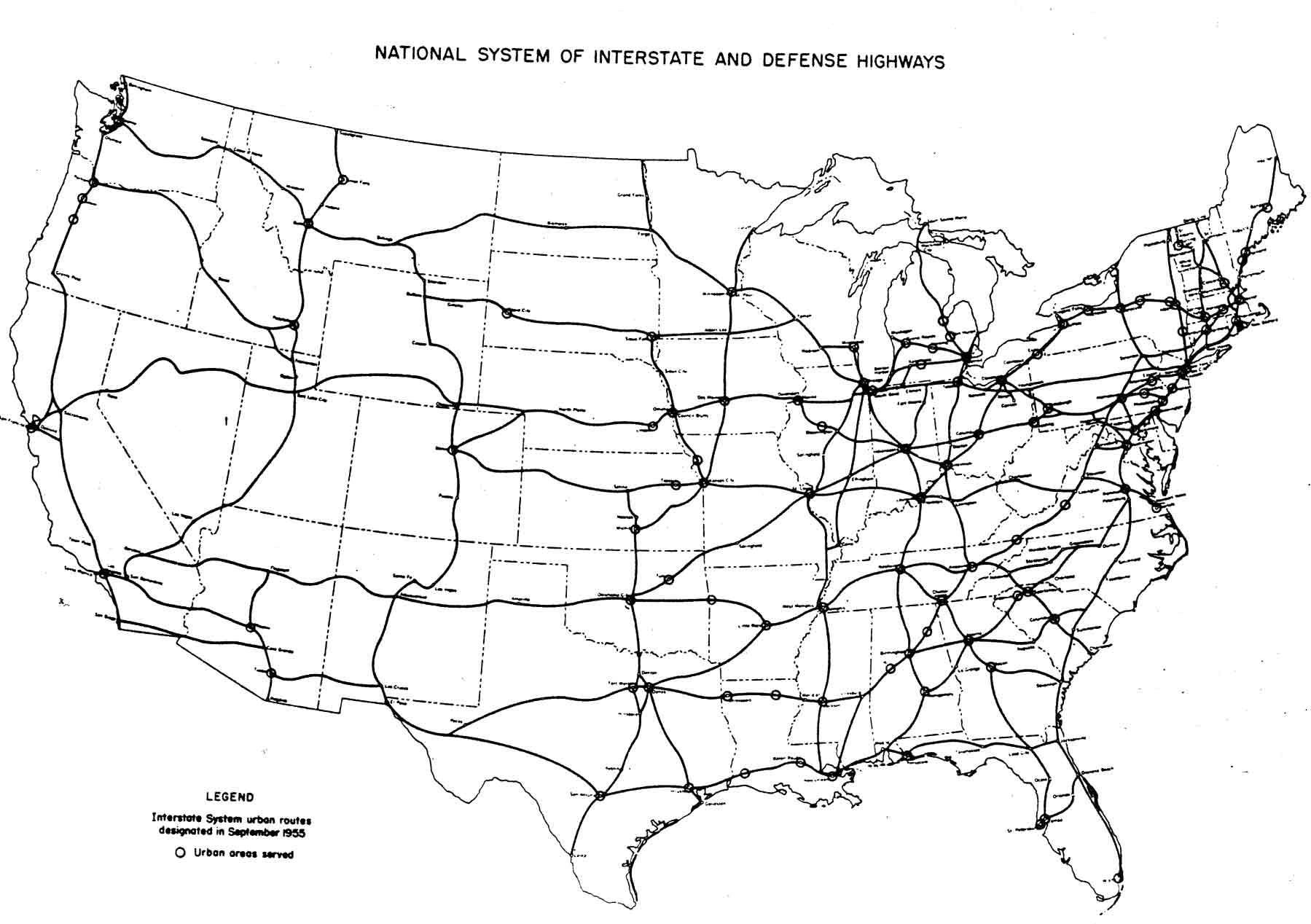
1955 plans for the Interstate Highway System

=== South ===
==== Florida ====
I-95 begins at US 1 just south of downtown Miami and travels along the state's east coast, passing through Fort Lauderdale, West Palm Beach, the Gold Coast, the Treasure Coast, the Space Coast, Daytona Beach, Port Orange, St. Augustine, and Jacksonville before entering the US state of Georgia near the city of Kingsland. In Miami and Fort Lauderdale, SunPass express lanes pass over the highway.

Before 1987, a notable gap in the highway existed between West Palm Beach and Fort Pierce; I-95 traffic between those cities was diverted to Florida's Turnpike. Today, I-95 runs along a routing parallel to the turnpike.

In 2010, more fatalities occurred along the Florida section of I-95 than on any other Interstate Highway in the country.

==== Georgia ====
In Georgia, I-95 closely parallels the coastline, traveling primarily through marshlands a few miles from the shore. The route bypasses the cores of major coastal cities Brunswick and Savannah, routing traffic through the western sides of both cities' metro areas; it connects to the latter city by an intersection with I-16 before crossing into South Carolina. The exit numbers were converted from a sequential system to a mileage-based system around 2000. I-95 in Georgia has the unsigned designation of State Route 405 (SR 405).

==== South Carolina ====
Entering South Carolina, I-95 diverts from its coastal route to a more inland route to the west. I-95 does not go near any major cities in South Carolina, with the largest city along its route being Florence, the tenth largest in the state. The rest of South Carolina can be accessed via other Interstates that intersect I-95. It intersects I-26 near Harleyville, which provides access to Charleston, Columbia, and Upstate South Carolina. It also intersects I-20 at Florence, which also connects to Columbia and then on to Atlanta, Georgia. At the North Carolina border, I-95 passes the South of the Border roadside attraction.

==== North Carolina ====
In North Carolina, I-95 informally serves as the separation between the state's central Piedmont and eastern Atlantic Plain regions. Much like its route in South Carolina, I-95 runs through mostly rural areas, avoiding major cities like Raleigh and Durham. The route intersects I-74 near Lumberton, I-40 near Benson, and Future I-87/US 64 near Rocky Mount. Several medium-sized cities lie along I-95 in North Carolina, including (from south to north) Fayetteville, Wilson, and Rocky Mount. At Gaston, I-95 crosses into Virginia.

=== Mid-Atlantic region ===
Much of I-95 in the Mid-Atlantic region is tolled, following the course of several turnpikes that predate the Interstate Highway System, as well as several other toll roads and toll bridges.

==== Virginia ====
I-95 enters the Mid-Atlantic region in Virginia and travels through the center of the densest and most populous urban region in the US. I-95 travels north–south through Virginia, passing through Petersburg, and follows the Richmond–Petersburg Turnpike into downtown Richmond (where it is concurrent briefly with I-64), and, from there, it turns northeast as it enters Northern Virginia. In the Washington metropolitan area, it is concurrent with the Capital Beltway from the Springfield Interchange along with I-495, before passing through the southernmost corner of the District of Columbia for about 300 feet (91 m) along the Woodrow Wilson Bridge before entering Maryland near National Harbor, Maryland.

==== Maryland ====
In Maryland, I-95 goes northeast toward Baltimore, paralleling the older Baltimore–Washington Parkway. I-95 uses the Fort McHenry Tunnel to travel under Baltimore's Inner Harbor and travels through northeast Maryland as the John F. Kennedy Memorial Highway, crossing into Delaware near Elkton.

==== Delaware ====
Entering Delaware at Newark, I-95 follows the Delaware Turnpike east across Delaware until the large and complex I-495/I-295/US 202/Delaware Route 141 interchange near Newport and turns northeast through Wilmington, skirting the west side of the downtown area before leaving Delaware in Claymont at the state's extreme northeastern corner. I-95 is the only two-digit interstate highway in Delaware, and it only passes through the Twelve-Mile Circle, the northernmost part of the state.

==== Pennsylvania ====
Entering southeastern Pennsylvania near Marcus Hook, I-95 crosses Delaware County and the city of Chester, closely following the Delaware River. Entering Philadelphia near Philadelphia International Airport, the freeway has an interchange with I-76 before it follows a large viaduct along the extreme eastern edge of Center City Philadelphia. Northeast of Philadelphia in Bucks County, I-95 joins the Pennsylvania Turnpike near Bristol before entering New Jersey on the Delaware River–Turnpike Toll Bridge.

==== New Jersey ====
I-95 follows a 77.96-mile-long (125.46 km) course in New Jersey, starting in the south at the Pearl Harbor Memorial Turnpike Extension of the New Jersey Turnpike, crossing the Delaware River on the Delaware River–Turnpike Toll Bridge, joining the mainline turnpike at exit 6. I-95 has interchanges with I-78 in Newark and I-80 in southern Teaneck. At the northern end of the turnpike in Fort Lee, I-95 turns southeast and crosses over the Hudson River into New York City via the George Washington Bridge.

==== New York ====
I-95 in New York City comprises all or part of several named expressways, including the Trans-Manhattan, Cross Bronx, and Bruckner expressways, as it crosses east-northeast across the boroughs of Manhattan and the Bronx. Within this 15-mile (24 km) stretch, I-95 intersects I-87 in the South Bronx, which connects to Albany and Upstate New York, as well as several auxiliary Interstates that provide access to other New York City boroughs and to Long Island. Entering Westchester County in Pelham, I-95 then follows the New England Thruway northeast to the Connecticut border at Port Chester, where it continues as the Connecticut Turnpike.

=== New England ===
==== Connecticut ====
I-95 enters New England in the state of Connecticut, where it closely follows the state's southern coast. The highway's direction through Connecticut is primarily east–west, and it passes through the most densely populated part of the state, including the cities of Stamford, Bridgeport (the state's most populous city), and New Haven. In New Haven, it intersects with I-91 as it passes into the more rural areas of the Lower Connecticut River Valley. I-95 leaves the Connecticut Turnpike at I-395 at the East Lyme–Waterford town line. I-95 next passes New London and Groton, before the route curves northeast and leaving its close connection to the coast. It leaves Connecticut in the town of North Stonington.

==== Rhode Island ====
I-95 enters Rhode Island in the town of Hopkinton and connects the rural areas of the southwestern corner of the state with the more metropolitan region around the state capital, Providence, in the state's northeastern corner. The highway's direction through Rhode Island is primarily southwest–northeast. It leaves Rhode Island in the city of Pawtucket.

==== Massachusetts ====
Entering Massachusetts in Attleboro, I-95 heads northeast toward Boston. In Canton, roughly a mile (1.6 km) south of Boston's city limits, it turns to the west and begins a 37-mile-long (60 km) concurrency with Route 128, a beltway that traverses Boston's inner suburbs. At this point, I-93 has its southern terminus and provides access to the city of Boston itself. I-95 intersects the Massachusetts Turnpike/I-90 at the Weston–Newton line and I-93 a second time at the tripoint of Woburn, Reading, and Stoneham. North of Boston, I-95 leaves the beltway and heads northward in Peabody, while Route 128 continues east to Cape Ann. I-95 leaves Massachusetts in Salisbury.

==== New Hampshire ====
I-95 enters New Hampshire in the town of Seabrook, following the pre-Interstate New Hampshire Turnpike (The Blue Star Turnpike) and traversing the 18-mile-long (29 km) Seacoast Region and the historic city of Portsmouth where it leaves the state. I-95 in New Hampshire is the shortest section of the highway (excluding D.C.).

==== Maine ====
In Maine, I-95 follows the Maine Turnpike, closely following the coast in a northeasterly direction until reaching Portland, the state's largest city. From there, it turns northward to Augusta, where the Maine Turnpike ends while I-95 continues north to Palmyra, where it turns east to Bangor. From Bangor, it turns north again to Smyrna and makes a final turn to the east, reaching the Houlton–Woodstock Border Crossing in Houlton. The road continues into the Canadian province of New Brunswick as Route 95.

== History ==
Many parts of I-95 were made up of toll roads that had already been constructed or planned, particularly in the northeast. Many of these routes still exist, but some have removed their tolls. All current I-95 toll facilities are compatible with the E-ZPass electronic payment system; in Florida, while I-95 can be driven toll-free, use of the "95 Express Managed Toll Lanes" requires a SunPass transponder (E-ZPass is now compatible with SunPass).

Toll roads that were formerly part of I-95 included Florida's Turnpike, the Richmond–Petersburg Turnpike (tolled until 1992), and the Connecticut Turnpike (tolled until 1985). Additionally, the Fuller Warren Bridge, spanning the St. Johns River in Jacksonville, was tolled until the 1980s. Tolls remain on Maryland's Fort McHenry Tunnel and John F. Kennedy Memorial Highway, the Delaware Turnpike, the Pennsylvania Turnpike, the New Jersey Turnpike, New York's George Washington Bridge and New England Thruway, the New Hampshire Turnpike, and the Maine Turnpike.

By 1968, three states had completed their sections of I-95: Connecticut, using its existing turnpikes; New York; and Delaware.

=== 21st century ===
Until 2018, a gap existed on I-95 within New Jersey. From Pennsylvania, I-95 entered the state on the Scudder Falls Bridge and continued east to US 1 in Lawrence Township. Here, I-95 abruptly ended and transitioned into I-295. From New York, I-95 entered the state on the George Washington Bridge and followed the New Jersey Turnpike south to exit 6, ran along the Pearl Harbor Memorial Extension, and ended on the Delaware River–Turnpike Toll Bridge at the Pennsylvania state line, where the route transitioned into the Pennsylvania Turnpike (I-276). This discontinuity was caused by the 1983 cancellation of the Somerset Freeway, a planned alignment of I-95 further inland from the New Jersey Turnpike. In order to close the gap, an interchange was constructed where I-95 crosses the Pennsylvania Turnpike in Bristol Township, Pennsylvania. After the first components of the interchange opened on September 22, 2018, I-95 was rerouted onto the Pennsylvania Turnpike, meeting up with where I-95 previously ended at the state line. This project closed the last remaining gap in the route. The former section of I-95 between the Pennsylvania Turnpike and US 1 in Lawrence became an extension of I-295. The interchange with the Pennsylvania Turnpike will be expanded in the future, connecting northbound I-95 with the westbound turnpike and the eastbound turnpike with southbound I-95.

In the 21st century, several large projects between Richmond, Virginia, and New Jersey have aimed to decrease congestion along the corridor. The reconstruction of the Springfield Interchange in Northern Virginia, just outside Washington, D.C. helped to ease traffic at the intersection of I-95, I-495, and I-395, and surrounding interchanges. The Springfield Interchange is one of the busiest highway junctions on the East Coast, serving between 400,000 and 500,000 vehicles per day. With the exception of high-occupancy toll (HOT) lanes on the Capital Beltway (I-495/I-95), this project was completed in July 2007. A few miles to the east was another major project: the Woodrow Wilson Bridge replacement. The bridge carries I-95/I-495 over the Potomac River. The former Woodrow Wilson Bridge, which has since been demolished, was a six-lane bridge that was severely overcapacity. The new bridge is actually two bridges with a total of 12 lanes; five in each direction, with an additional lane in each direction for future use (rapid-bus or train). This project was completed with the 10 lanes opened on December 13, 2008, greatly reducing the traffic delays on the beltway. The lanes are divided into two through lanes and three local lanes in each direction. About 30 miles (48 km) north of the Wilson Bridge, and about 20 miles (32 km) south of Baltimore near Laurel, Maryland, construction on a large new interchange began in 2008, was scheduled for completion in late 2011, and opened to traffic on November 9, 2014, which connects I-95 to Maryland Route 200 (MD 200).

In 2006, the Virginia General Assembly passed SJ184, a resolution calling for an interstate compact to build a toll highway between Dover, Delaware, and Charleston, South Carolina, as an alternative to I-95 that would allow long-distance traffic to avoid the Washington metropolitan area.

Federal legislation has identified I-95 through Connecticut as High Priority Corridor 65. A long-term multibillion-dollar program to upgrade the entire length of I-95 through Connecticut has been underway since the mid-1990s and is expected to continue through at least 2020. Several miles of the Connecticut Turnpike through Bridgeport were widened and brought up to Interstate standards. Work has shifted to reconstructing and widening 12 miles (19 km) of I-95 through New Haven, which includes replacing the Pearl Harbor Memorial Bridge. Environmental studies for reconstructing and widening 60 miles (97 km) of I-95 from New Haven to the Rhode Island state line are also progressing.

There are plans to expand the 1,054-mile (1,696 km) I-95 corridor from Petersburg, Virginia, to Florida through a US multistate agreement to study how to improve the corridor through widening and reconstruction, with the goal of reducing congestion and improving overall safety for years to come.

I-95 from the South Carolina–Georgia line to the freeway's southern terminus in South Florida has been widened to a minimum of six lanes. The section from Jacksonville to the I-4 junction in Daytona Beach was expanded to six lanes in 2005. Projects begun in 2009, widening the roadbed in Brevard County from the State Route 528 junction in Cocoa to Palm Bay, as well as in northern Palm Beach County. The last segments of I-95 in Florida to remain at only four lanes have now been upgraded, providing motorists with about 500 miles (800 km) of continuous six-lane roadbed.

In 2009, state legislators representing Maine's Aroostook County proposed using federal economic stimulus funds to extend I-95 north to Maine's northernmost border community of Fort Kent via Caribou and Presque Isle. The proposed route would parallel New Brunswick's four-lane, limited-access Trans-Canada Highway on the US side of the Canadian border. Legislators argued that extension of the Interstate would promote economic growth in the region.

On June 11, 2023, a portion of the northbound section of I-95 collapsed in Philadelphia. This was due to a gasoline tanker catching fire after a crash. A temporary roadway opened at the site of the collapsed bridge ten days later, on June 23, 2023.

== Major intersections ==
Florida
US 1 in Miami
US 41 in Miami
Florida's Turnpike in Golden Glades
US 441 in Golden Glades
I-595 in Fort Lauderdale
US 98 in West Palm Beach
US 192 in Melbourne
I-4 in Daytona Beach
US 92 in Daytona Beach
I-295 in Jacksonville
US 90 in Jacksonville
I-10 / US 17 in Jacksonville. I-95/US 17 travel concurrently through the city.
US 23 in Jacksonville
Georgia
US 17 / US 82 in Brunswick
US 84 near Midway
I-16 in Pooler
US 80 in Pooler
South Carolina
US 278 in Hardeeville
US 17 in Ridgeland. The highways travel concurrently to Point South.
US 21 in Yemassee
US 78 in St. George
US 178 near Bowman
I-26 near Harleyville
US 176 near Holly Hill
US 15 / US 301 near Santee. The highways travel concurrently to Santee.
US 521 near Manning
US 378 near Turbeville
US 76 in Florence
I-20 in Florence
US 52 near Florence
North Carolina
US 301 / US 501 near Rowland
US 301 near Rowland. The highways travel concurrently to Lumberton.
I-74 / US 74 near Lumberton
I-295 / US 13 in Eastover
US 421 in Dunn
I-40 in Benson
US 70 in Selma
I-587 / I-795 / US 264 in Wilson
US 64 in Rocky Mount
US 158 in Roanoke Rapids
Virginia
US 58 in Emporia
I-295 near Petersburg
I-85 / US 460 in Petersburg. I-95/US 460 travel concurrently through the city.
I-64 in Richmond. The highways travel concurrently through Richmond.
US 250 in Richmond
I-195 in Richmond
US 1 / US 301 in Richmond
US 17 in Fredericksburg. The highways travel concurrently through Fredericksburg.
I-395 / I-495 in Springfield. I-95/I-495 travel concurrently to College Park, Maryland.
District of Columbia
none
Maryland
I-295 near Forest Heights
US 50 near Glenarden
I-495 near Adelphi
I-895 near Baltimore
I-195 near Baltimore
I-695 near Baltimore
I-395 in Baltimore
US 40 in Baltimore
Delaware
I-295 / I-495 / US 202 in Newport. I-95/US 202 travel concurrently through Wilmington.
Pennsylvania
US 322 in Chester. The highways travel concurrently through Chester.
I-476 in Ridley Township
I-76 in Philadelphia
I-676 / US 30 in Philadelphia
I-295 / I-276 / Penna Turnpike near Bristol
US 13 near Bristol
New Jersey
US 130 in Florence Township
N.J. Turnpike in Mansfield Township
US 206 in Bordentown Township
I-195 in Robbinsville Township
I-287 in Edison Township
G.S. Parkway / US 9 in Woodbridge Township
I-278 in Elizabeth
I-78 / US 1 / US 9 in Newark
I-280 in Kearny
Route 495 in Secaucus / North Bergen
US 46 in Ridgefield Park
I-80 in Teaneck Township
US 1 / US 9 / US 46 / US 9W in Fort Lee. I-95/US 1/US 9/US 46 travel concurrently to New York City.
New York
US 9 in Manhattan
I-87 in The Bronx
I-278 / I-295 / I-678 in Throggs Neck
I-287 in Rye
Connecticut
US 7 in Norwalk
I-91 in New Haven
I-395 in East Lyme
Rhode Island
I-295 in Warwick
I-195 / US 6 in Providence. I-95/US 6 travel concurrently through the city.
US 6 in Providence
US 44 in Providence
US 44 in Providence
US 1 in Pawtucket. The highways travel concurrently through the city.
Massachusetts
I-295 in Attleboro
I-495 in Mansfield
I-93 / US 1 / Route 128 in Canton. I-95/US 1 travel concurrently to Dedham. I-95/MA 128 travel concurrently to Peabody.
I-90/Mass Pike in Weston
US 20 in Waltham
US 3 in Burlington. The highways travel concurrently through the town.
I-93 in Reading
Route 128 in Peabody
I-495 in Amesbury
MA-2 in Lexington
New Hampshire
US 4 / Spaulding Turnpike in Portsmouth
Maine
I-195 in Saco
I-295 near Portland
I-495 in Portland
US 202 in Augusta
US 201 in Fairfield
I-395 / SR 15 in Bangor
US 2 in Bangor
US 1 in Houlton
US 2 in Houlton
Route 95 in Houlton

== Auxiliary routes ==
I-95 has many auxiliary routes. They can be found in most states the route runs through, with exceptions being Georgia, South Carolina, and New Hampshire. Business routes of I-95 also exist in both Georgia and North Carolina.

Florida

- Interstate 195 is a spur into Miami, the northern of the two spurs into Miami (the other being I-395).
- Interstate 295 is a beltway around Jacksonville.
- Interstate 395 is a spur into Miami, the southern of the two spurs into Miami (the other being I-195).
- Interstate 595 is a spur west of I-95 to I-75 and east of I-95 to Fort Lauderdale.
- Interstate 795 is a future designation along State Route 9B.

North Carolina

- Interstate 295 is a beltway around Fayetteville.
- Interstate 795 is a spur running to Goldsboro.

Virginia

- Interstate 195 is a short spur from north of downtown Richmond south into downtown.
- Interstate 295 is a bypass to the east of Richmond, from I-95 south of Petersburg, across I-64 east of Richmond and I-95 north of Richmond to I-64 west of Richmond.
- Interstate 395 is a branch from Springfield north into downtown Washington, D.C. It was part of I-95 until 1977.
- Interstate 495 is the Capital Beltway, a full loop around Washington, D.C. Since 1977, I-95 has run along its east half.

District of Columbia

- Interstate 295 is a branch from I-95 near the Woodrow Wilson Bridge through Anacostia and north to an interchange with I-695 and District of Columbia Route 295 (DC 295).
- Interstate 395 is a branch from Springfield north into downtown Washington, D.C., terminating at New York Avenue. It was part of I-95 until 1977.
- Interstate 695 is the Southeast Freeway, connecting I-395 and DC 295.

Maryland

- Interstate 195 is a spur into Baltimore/Washington International Airport.
- Interstate 295 is a southern route into Washington, D.C.
- Interstate 395 is a spur into downtown Baltimore.
- Interstate 495 is the Capital Beltway.
- Interstate 595 is an unsigned segment of US 50 between the Capital Beltway and Annapolis.
- Interstate 695 is the Baltimore Beltway.
- Interstate 795 is a bypass of MD 140 in Reisterstown and Owings Mills. It never connects to I-95.
- Interstate 895 is the Harbor Tunnel Thruway.

Delaware, Pennsylvania, and New Jersey

- Interstate 195 is a freeway through Central Jersey.
- Interstate 295 is an eastern bypass of Philadelphia.
- Interstate 495 is a bypass of Wilmington, Delaware.

New York

- Interstate 295 runs southeast from the Bruckner Interchange along the Cross Bronx Expressway, then south over the Throgs Neck Bridge and Clearview Expressway to its terminus at Hillside Avenue, just south of the Grand Central Parkway. It was once signed as part of I-78 and was planned to terminate at John F. Kennedy International Airport.
- Interstate 495 runs from the Queens–Midtown Tunnel east along the Long Island Expressway to Riverhead, crossing I-295 in Queens. It was once planned to continue west to I-95 in New Jersey; that part is now Lincoln Tunnel and Route 495. It was also to go east and meet I-95 again in either Connecticut or in Rhode Island. This would have made I-495 a bypass road for I-95.
- Interstate 695 is a short route along the Throgs Neck Expressway, connecting I-295 to I-95 in the Bronx. It was once signed as part of I-78. The number had been used for other plans, including a route parallel to Woodhaven Boulevard and an upgrade of the West Side Highway and Henry Hudson Parkway.

Connecticut, Rhode Island, and Massachusetts

- Interstate 195 is a spur route east of Providence.
- Interstate 295 is a partial outer beltway around Providence.
- Interstate 395 runs from the junction with I-95 in Waterford north into Massachusetts, where it meets I-90/Massachusetts Turnpike and I-290 south of Worcester.
- Interstate 495 is a partial outer beltway around Boston.

Maine

- Interstate 195 is the Saco industrial spur.
- Interstate 295 connects with I-95 in Portland and Gardiner.
- Interstate 395 is a spur to the east of Bangor.
- Interstate 495 is the Falmouth spur.

== See also ==
- 2023 Interstate 95 highway collapse
