= New Brunswick Route 110 =

Highway in New Brunswick

Route 110

Route information
- Maintained by New Brunswick Department of Transportation
- Length: 15.9 km (9.9 mi)
- Existed: 1976–present

Major junctions
- West end: Boundary Line Road at the U.S. border in Centreville
- Route 2 (TCH) in Centerville
- East end: Route 130 in Florenceville

Location
- Country: Canada
- Province: New Brunswick
- Counties: Carleton

Highway system
- Provincial highways in New Brunswick; Former routes
← Route 109	→ Route 111

Route 110 is 15.9-kilometre (9.9 mi) long highway in New Brunswick, Canada; running from the Canada–US border crossing at Bridgewater, Maine as a continuation of Boundary Line Road, a connector to U.S. Route 1 (US 1). The route crosses through Carleton County, crossing Route 2 (Trans-Canada Highway) in Centreville. The route runs along the Saint John River before reaching Florenceville-Bristol, where it terminates at an intersection with Route 130 on the riverbank.

Historically, Route 110 was known as Route 6 until 1965, and Route 555 between 1965 and 1970.

== Route description ==
Route 110 beings at the Bridgewater - Centreville Border Crossing in Centerville as a continuation of Boundary Line Road, a local road to downtown Bridgewater, Maine. The route runs along the bank of the Big Presque Isle Stream, passing a junction with Royalton Road, which connects to the community of Lower Royalton. After turning away from the steam, Route 110 runs southeast into a junction with Route 550 as it enters the small residential community of Tracey Mills, marking the terminus of Route 550.

Route 110 continues east through Tracey Mills, continuing along the Big Presque Isle Stream into the village of Centreville. Running as a two-lane road through Centreville, the route bends northeast, passing the Centreville Community School and gaining the name Centre Street at the intersection with Route 560 in the center of the village. Route 110 leaves Centreville and enters rural Carleton County. The route then enters a valley, where it reaches a diamond interchange with Route 2 (Highway of Heroes) and the Trans-Canada Highway.

Now known as Centreville Road, Route 110 runs northeast away from Route 2 and enters Florenceville-Bristol, where it intersects with the northern end of Route 103 (Centreville Road). Route 110 continues into Florenceville-Bristol, making a 90-degree turn towards the Saint John River, reaching an intersection with Route 130. This junction marks the eastern terminus of Route 110.

== Junction list ==
The entire route is in Carleton County.

Location	km	mi	Destinations	Notes
Bridgewater - Centreville Border Crossing	0.0	0.0	Boundary Line Road – Bridgewater, Maine	Continuation into Maine, United States
Tracey Mills	3.9	2.4	Route 550 – Bloomfield	Northern terminus of Route 550.
Centreville	6.8	4.2	Route 560 – Jacksonville	
Florenceville-Bristol	11.5	7.1	Route 2 (TCH) (Highway of Heroes)	Exit 153 (Route 2/TCH); diamond interchange
Florenceville-Bristol	13.3	8.3	Route 103 (Centreville Road) – Somerville	Northern terminus of Route 103.
Florenceville-Bristol	15.9	9.9	Route 130 – Florenceville-Bristol	
1.000 mi = 1.609 km; 1.000 km = 0.621 mi

== See also ==
- List of New Brunswick provincial highways
- Provincial archives of New Brunswick recorded circa June 30, 1971 formally route 6. River glade, Salisbury, Moncton, Dieppe, Sackville F3900 - NB Rte 6 - 1971 PANB | APNB
