= Lakeville, Carleton County, New Brunswick =

Coordinates: 46°20′31.9″N 67°41′22.9″W

Lakeville is a community in the Canadian province of New Brunswick. This small village is located between Centreville and Woodstock. It is located on Route 560 in Carleton County. It has two churches, a convenience store, a post office, a fire hall, a park, and a community center. In the center of this village is the Williamstown Lake.

== Demographics ==
In the 2021 Census of Population conducted by Statistics Canada, Lakeville had a population of 266 living in 119 of its 123 total private dwellings, a change of -12.8% from its 2016 population of 305. With a land area of 33.72 km^{2} (13.02 sq mi), it had a population density of 7.9/km^{2} (20.4/sq mi) in 2021.

== Education ==
Students from the area are bused to Centreville for education levels Kindergarten through grade 8. Grades 9 through 12 attend Carleton North High School in Bristol.

== See also ==
- List of communities in New Brunswick
