= Bridgewater–Centreville Border Crossing =

Canada–United States border crossing

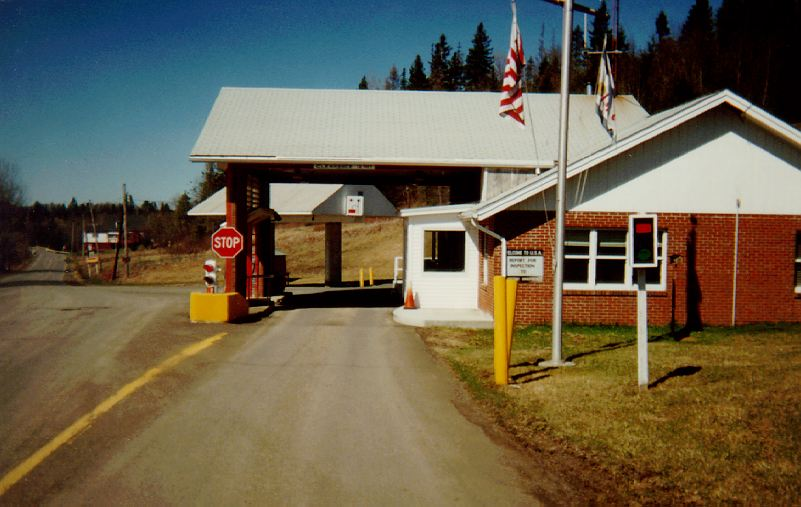
- The US Border Inspection Station at Bridgewater, Maine as seen in 1996.

Locaiton
- Country: United States; Canada
- Location: Route 110 / Boundary Line Road; US Port: 454 Boundary Line Road, Bridgewater, ME 04735; Canadian Port: 1449 Route 110, Royalton NB E7K 2E3
- Coordinates: 46.45035°N 67.784784°W

Details
- Opened: 1936

Website
- http://www.cbp.gov/contact/ports/bridgewater

The Bridgewater–Centreville Border Crossing connects the towns of Bridgewater, Maine and Centreville, New Brunswick on the Canada–US border. The crossing is reached by Boundary Line Road on the American side and by New Brunswick Route 110 on the Canadian side. The US and Canadian governments both built new border stations at this crossing in 1976. In 2012, the US replaced its border station once again. It is open from 6am to 10pm.

== See also ==
- List of Canada–United States border crossings
