= New Brunswick Route 165 =

Highway in New Brunswick, Canada

Route 165

Route information
- Maintained by New Brunswick Department of Transportation
- Length: 22.06 km (13.71 mi)
- Existed: 2003–present

Major junctions
- North end: Route 103 in Woodstock
- South end: Route 2 (TCH) / Route 122 in Lakeland Ridges

Location
- Country: Canada
- Province: New Brunswick
- Major cities: Woodstock, Lakeland Ridges

Highway system
- Provincial highways in New Brunswick; Former routes
← Route 161	→ Route 170

Route 165 is a 22 km (14 mi)-long north–south secondary highway in the western New Brunswick, Canada.

The route's northern terminus is in downtown Woodstock, New Brunswick at Route 103, where the road is known as Main Street. From there, it runs south along the western bank of the Saint John River to the small village of Lakeland Ridges. From there, the highway stops following the Saint John River and takes a slight southern turn which brings it to its terminus at an intersection with Route 2 (exit 212) and Route 122.

== River crossings ==
- Bulls Creek in Bulls Creek
- Eel River in Lakeland Ridges

== Communities along the Route ==
- Woodstock
- Lower Woodstock
- Woodstock First Nation
- Bulls Creek
- Flemmington
- Hay Settlement
- Hillman
- Riceville
- Lakeland Ridges

== See also ==
- List of New Brunswick provincial highways
