= New Brunswick Route 122 =

Highway in New Brunswick, Canada

Route 122

Route information
- Maintained by New Brunswick Department of Transportation
- Length: 43.83 km (27.23 mi)
- Existed: 1965–present

Major junctions
- East end: Route 2 / Route 165 in Dow Settlement
- West end: Boundary Road at the U.S. border near Orient, ME

Location
- Country: Canada
- Province: New Brunswick
- Major cities: Lakeland Ridges, Fosterville

Highway system
- Provincial highways in New Brunswick; Former routes
← Route 121	→ Route 123

Route 122 is a mostly East/West provincial highway in the Canadian province of New Brunswick. The road runs from Route 2 and Route 165 intersection in Dow Settlement. The road has a length of approximately 44 kilometres, and services small, otherwise isolated rural communities. In these areas, the highway is often unofficially referred to as "Main Street." The road bypasses several Lakes including Skiff Lake, Mud Lake, Eel River Lake, North Lake and finally Grand Lake before changing to Boundary Road in Orient, Maine at the Canada–United States border. The Highway is known as Canterbury Road within Lakeland Ridges.

== Intersecting routes ==
- Begins with the continuation over Route 2 over exit 212 at Route 2 in Johnson Settlement
- Connects to Route 630 in Lakeland Ridges
- Route 540 in Graham Corner
- Changes to Boundary Road at the US/Canada Border in Fosterville

== River crossings ==
- None

== Communities along the Route ==
- Johnson Settlement
- Dow Settlement
- Lakeland Ridges
- Skiff Lake
- Eel River Lake
- Graham Corner
- Fosterville

== See also ==
- List of New Brunswick provincial highways
