= New Brunswick Route 95 =

Highway in New Brunswick

Route 95
- Route 95 highlighted in red.

Route information
- Maintained by Brun-Way Highway Operations
- Length: 14.5 km (9.0 mi)
- Existed: 1974–present

Major junctions
- West end: I-95 at the U.S. border near Houlton, ME
- East end: Route 2 (TCH) / Route 103 in Woodstock

Location
- Country: Canada
- Province: New Brunswick
- Counties: Carleton

Highway system
- Provincial highways in New Brunswick; Former routes
← Route 17	→ Route 100

Route 95 is a 14.5-kilometre-long (9.0 mi) provincial highway in New Brunswick that connects Interstate 95 (I-95) at the Houlton–Woodstock Border Crossing near Houlton, Maine, United States, to New Brunswick Route 2 (the Trans-Canada Highway) in Woodstock, New Brunswick, Canada.

Prior to the construction of Route 95, the connection between the two cities was served by Route 5. In 2007, the New Brunswick government completed a roadworks project to turn Route 95 into a full freeway for its entire length.

== Route description ==
Route 95 begins at the Houlton–Woodstock Border Crossing on the Maine–New Brunswick border as an extension of I-95. The border between the two countries also marks the border between the Eastern Time Zone and the Atlantic Time Zone. The highway travels northeast through woodlands as it approaches its first interchange with Route 540 via a hybrid diamond interchange/partial cloverleaf interchange, providing access to the towns of Richmond Corner and Belleville. Continuing east, the highway crosses over Plymouth Road before intersecting an eastbound exit for Vivglenn Road, which connects to Route 555. The final exit on the highway is a trumpet interchange with Route 2, which is the main route of the Trans-Canada Highway through the province, in Woodstock.

== History ==
A road linking Houlton to Woodstock has existed since at least 1927. It was numbered Route 5 in 1938.

The current Route 95 was completed in 1974. The new highway bypassed the original alignment of Route 5, which is now numbered Route 555. In the mid 1990's the intersection between Route 95 and Route 2 was converted into an interchange. In 2007, the New Brunswick Department of Transportation completed a C$33 million construction project, turning Route 95 from a two-lane undivided highway to a grade-separated four lane freeway. The Province has contracted with Brun-Way Highway Operations to provide maintenance for the highway until 2033.

== Exit list ==
The entire route is in Carleton County.

Location	km	mi	Exit	Destinations	Notes
	0.0	0.0		I-95 south – Houlton	Continuation into Maine
	0.0	0.0	Canada–United States border at Houlton–Woodstock Border Crossing		
			5	Visitor Information	Was an eastbound exit only
	6.5	4.0	7	Route 540 – Richmond Corner, Belleville	
	12.3	7.6	12	To Route 555 (Vivglenn Road)	Eastbound exit only
Woodstock	14.5	9.0		Route 2 (TCH) – Fredericton, Grand Falls; Route 103 (Houlton Road)	Eastern terminus; Exit 187 on Route 2; continuation beyond Route 95
1.000 mi = 1.609 km; 1.000 km = 0.621 mi: Closed/former; Incomplete access
