= Bloomfield, Carleton County, New Brunswick =

Coordinates: 46.324°N 67.76075°W

Location of Bloomfield in Carleton County, New Brunswick

Bloomfield is a community in the Canadian province of New Brunswick. It is located in Carleton County.

Unincorporated area in the Parish of Wilmot. Located about 20 kilometers from Woodstock and about the same from the Centreville area. It is a small farming community focusing on potato cultivation, with some mixed farming and only one larger dairy farm.

== Religion ==
The church in Bloomfield is the United Church of Canada and the cemetery located right there (in Route 550 and the Monticello, Maine Road) is called the Bloomfield United Church Cemetery.

== See also ==
- List of communities in New Brunswick
