= Orient, Maine =

Town in Maine, United States

- Town
- Location of Orient, Maine
- Coordinates: 45°49′21″N 67°52′26″W
- Country: United States
- State: Maine
- County: Aroostook

Area
  - Total: 37.67 sq mi (97.56 km^{2})
  - Land: 35.52 sq mi (92.00 km^{2})
  - Water: 2.15 sq mi (5.57 km^{2})
- Elevation: 449 ft (137 m)

Population (2020)
  - Total: 156
  - Density: 4.4/sq mi (1.7/km^{2})
- Time zone: UTC−5 (Eastern (EST))
  - Summer (DST): UTC−4 (EDT)
- ZIP Code: 04471
- Area code: 207
- FIPS code: 23-55435
- GNIS feature ID: 582649
- Website: orienttownoffice.com

Orient is a town in Aroostook County, Maine, United States. The population was 156 at the 2020 census.

== Geography ==
According to the United States Census Bureau, the town has a total area of 37.67 square miles (97.56 km^{2}), of which 35.52 square miles (92.00 km^{2}) is land and 2.15 square miles (5.57 km^{2}) is water. The town is bordered on the north by the town of Amity, on the south by the town of Weston, on the west by the town of Haynesville, and on the east by the Saint Croix River and the parish of North Lake, New Brunswick, which are connected by the Orient–Fosterville Border Crossing.

== Demographics ==
Historical population
Census	Pop.	Note	%±
1850	205		—
1860	233		13.7%
1870	219		−6.0%
1880	224		2.3%
1890	244		8.9%
1900	208		−14.8%
1910	187		−10.1%
1920	170		−9.1%
1930	161		−5.3%
1940	147		−8.7%
1950	176		19.7%
1960	124		−29.5%
1970	83		−33.1%
1980	97		16.9%
1990	157		61.9%
2000	145		−7.6%
2010	147		1.4%
2020	156		6.1%
U.S. Decennial Census

=== 2010 census ===
As of the census of 2010, there were 147 people, 63 households, and 39 families living in the town. The population density was 4.1 inhabitants per square mile (1.6/km^{2}). There were 282 housing units at an average density of 7.9 per square mile (3.1/km^{2}). The racial makeup of the town was 95.9% White, 0.7% Native American, and 3.4% from two or more races. Hispanic or Latino of any race were 2.0% of the population.

There were 63 households, of which 25.4% had children under the age of 18 living with them, 46.0% were married couples living together, 12.7% had a female householder with no husband present, 3.2% had a male householder with no wife present, and 38.1% were non-families. 25.4% of all households were made up of individuals, and 4.8% had someone living alone who was 65 years of age or older. The average household size was 2.33 and the average family size was 2.69.

The median age in the town was 47.3 years. 19% of residents were under the age of 18; 9% were between the ages of 18 and 24; 18.4% were from 25 to 44; 38.1% were from 45 to 64; and 15.6% were 65 years of age or older. The gender makeup of the town was 53.7% male and 46.3% female.

=== 2000 census ===
As of the census of 2000, there were 145 people, 61 households, and 40 families living in the town. The population density was 4.1 people per square mile (1.6/km^{2}). There were 270 housing units at an average density of 7.5 per square mile (2.9/km^{2}). The racial makeup of the town was 100.00% White. Hispanic or Latino of any race were 0.69% of the population.

There were 61 households, out of which 31.1% had children under the age of 18 living with them, 50.8% were married couples living together, 9.8% had a female householder with no husband present, and 32.8% were non-families. 23.0% of all households were made up of individuals, and 6.6% had someone living alone who was 65 years of age or older. The average household size was 2.38 and the average family size was 2.76.

In the town, the age distribution of the population shows 22.8% under the age of 18, 4.8% from 18 to 24, 28.3% from 25 to 44, 24.8% from 45 to 64, and 19.3% who were 65 years of age or older. The median age was 42 years. For every 100 females, there were 107.1 males. For every 100 females age 18 and over, there were 111.3 males.

The median income for a household in the town was $19,750, and the median income for a family was $26,250. Males had a median income of $36,250 versus $20,625 for females. The per capita income for the town was $12,131. There were 18.2% of families and 29.6% of the population living below the poverty line, including 29.7% of under eighteens and 6.5% of those over 64.
