= Houlton–Woodstock Border Crossing =

Canada–United States border crossing

Houlton-Woodstock Border Crossing
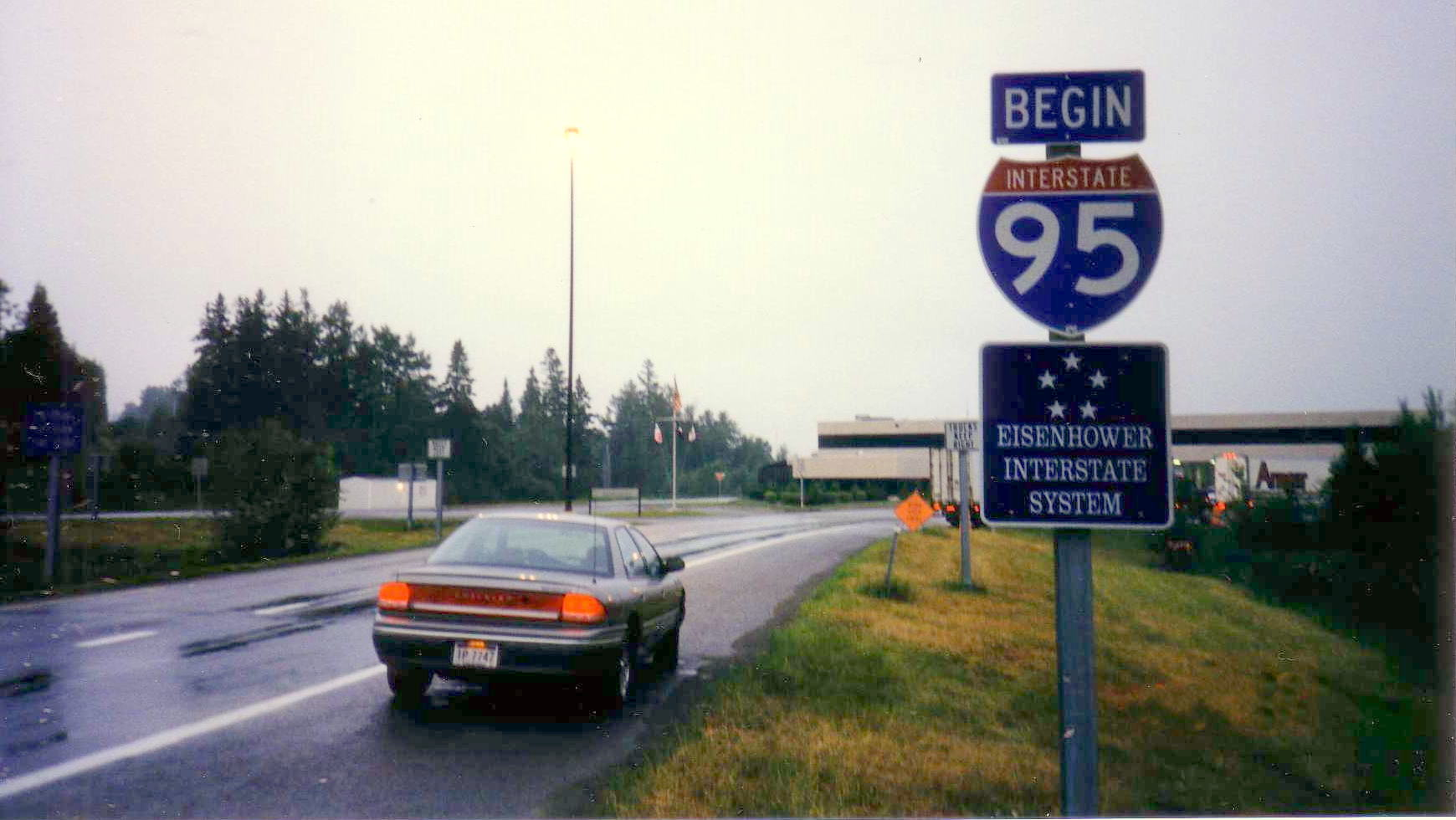
- Beginning of Interstate 95 at the Houlton-Woodstock crossing

Locaiton
- Country: United States; Canada
- Location: I-95 / Route 95; US Port: Interstate 95, Houlton, ME 04730; Canadian Port: 1403 Route 95, Belleville NB E7M 4Z9
- Coordinates: 46°08′07″N 67°46′52″W

Details
- Opened: 1985

Website
- US website; Canadian website

The Houlton–Woodstock Border Crossing is a border crossing and port of entry on the Canada–United States border, east of Houlton, Maine, and west of Woodstock, New Brunswick. The U.S. border station is often called Houlton Station. Around 2004, Canada began calling its border station Woodstock Road. It is the easternmost land border crossing between the two countries.

The border crossing marks the northern terminus of Interstate 95, and the western terminus of New Brunswick Route 95. This crossing was established on October 25, 1985, upon the completion of New Brunswick Route 95. At that time, the old crossing located on U.S. Route 2 immediately to the south was permanently closed.

It is a time zone boundary between Eastern Time Zone and Atlantic Time Zone.

== See also ==
- List of Canada–United States border crossings
