= Pemberton Ridge, New Brunswick =

Coordinates: 45°43′N 67°45′W

Pemberton Ridge is a rural community in North Lake Parish, York County, New Brunswick, Canada.

It is situated 6 kilometres north of Forest City on a hill overlooking East Grand Lake and Spednic Lake. Today the community is home to a population of approximately 5 residents.

== History ==
In the early 1860s it was called "Skedaddle Ridge" because of settlers from Maine who fled there to avoid draft into the American Civil War. Some of the settlers include the Leeman and MacKenney families, of which descendants are still living there. In its heyday, Pemberton Ridge probably had a population of 15–20 families comprising 75–100 residents.

The community had a post office from 1872 to 1877 and thereafter relied on services in Forest City, as well as rural delivery. The farming community did not have a church but did have a school house and occasionally church services were held in that building. While the larger centers of Canterbury, (34 kilometres) or Danforth (30 kilometres) provided access to the Canadian Pacific Railway, as well as other commodities such as farm supplies and consumer items, Forest City was the service centre for the community.

Church and Sunday school were usually held in the school house, although residents would occasionally attend a meeting at Green Mountain or Forest City. Predominantly Baptists by faith, meetings or services as they were sometimes called, contained an aura of quiet tranquility and not given to emotional renditions, testimonial or otherwise.

== See also ==
- List of communities in New Brunswick
