= Zildjian (disambiguation) =

Zildjian is a musical instrument manufacturer and the largest cymbal and drumstick maker in the world.

Zildjian is also a surname. It may refer to:

related to cymbals

- Avedis Zildjian (17th century), an Armenian Ottoman metalsmith and alchemist
  - Haroutune Zildjian son of Avedis Zildjian, continued his father's worked and then passed it to his own son
  - Avedis (2nd) Zildjian named in his grandfather's name.
  - Kerop Zildjian, Avedis'brother
  - Haroutune (2nd) Zildjian
  - Aram Zildjian
  - Avedis (3rd) Zildjian. For all of above, see Avedis Zildjian Company#Beginnings and Avedis Zildjian Company#1900sBeginnings
- Armand Zildjian (1921-2002), Armenian-American manufacturer of cymbals and the head of the Avedis Zildjian Company
- Robert Zildjian (1923–2013), Armenian-American manufacturer of cymbals, the founder of Sabian Cymbals, the second-largest manufacturer of cymbals in the world

others

- Daniel Zildjian Benitez or Zild Benitez (born 1997), Filipino musician, producer, and singer-songwriter
