= Robert Zildjian =

American businessman

- Born: Robert Zildjian; July 14, 1923; Boston, Massachusetts, U.S.
- Died: March 28, 2013 (aged 89); Brunswick, Maine, U.S.
- Burial place: Lakeland Ridges, New Brunswick, Canada
- Relatives: Armand Zildjian (brother)

Robert Zildjian (July 14, 1923 – March 28, 2013) was the founder of Sabian Cymbals, the second-largest manufacturer of cymbals in the world.

== Career ==
Zildjian was born in Boston, Massachusetts, and belonged to the Zildjian family, which brought the technology of cymbal production from Ottoman Empire to the United States by Armenian Avedis Zildjian, and then passed it on to future generations of family members. The company was founded in 1981 in Meductic, New Brunswick, Canada, by Robert Zildjian, son of Avedis Zildjian III, the head of the Avedis Zildjian Company located in Quincy, Massachusetts. Family tradition had it that the head of the company would pass its secrets down only to the oldest son, but Avedis III gave the information to both his sons, Armand Zildjian and Robert Zildjian. A family feud resulted in Robert leaving Zildjian to form the rival Sabian Cymbals company. Robert Zildjian said, "It got to the point where they were taking away certain parts of my job. I was the export man. I was the advertising. I was the marketing. I was quite a few things. All of a sudden, I was bereft of all that." The companies continue to be rivals, and are both among the world's most popular cymbal brands. Sabian cymbals have been used by many famous drummers in the world, including Phil Collins, Tony Royster Jr. (Jay Z), Chad Smith of Red Hot Chili Peppers, Neil Peart of Rush, and Mike Portnoy of Dream Theater. Zildjian remained active in management until recently, spending most of the summer in a cottage in Meductic, New Brunswick, near the main production facility.

Zildjian formed the word Sabian from the two first letters of the names of his three children Sally, Bill and Andy (a nickname for Armand) and "-ian" (indicating Armenian descent).

== Death ==
Zildjian died from cancer on March 28, 2013, at his home in Brunswick, Maine, at the age of 89. In addition to his wife Willi, sons Andy and Wilson (Bill), and daughter Sally Zildjian-Teague, he was survived by eight grandchildren.
