= North Lake Parish, New Brunswick =

North Lake
- Parish
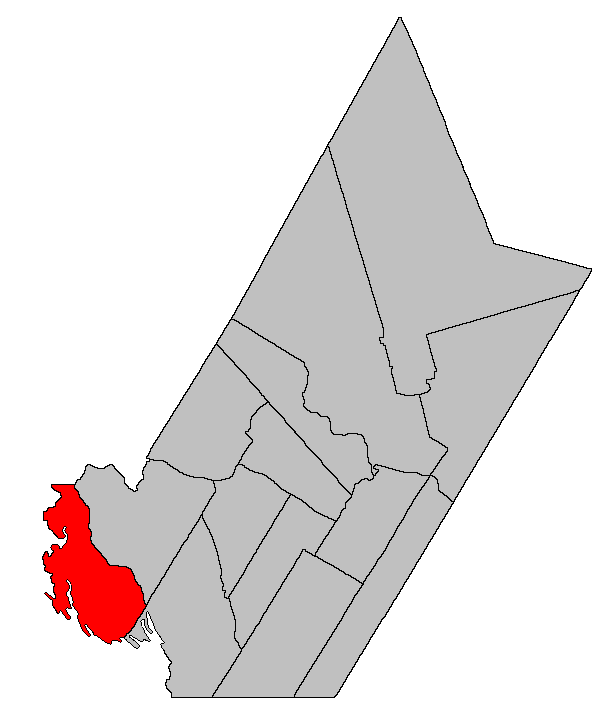
- Location within York County, New Brunswick.
- Coordinates: 45.8275°N 67.73°W
- Country: Canada
- Province: New Brunswick
- County: York
- Erected: 1879

Area
  - Land: 439.60 km^{2} (169.73 sq mi)

Population (2021)
  - Total: 282
  - Density: 0.6/km^{2} (1.6/sq mi)
  - Change 2016-2021: ▲21.0%
  - Dwellings: 383
- Time zone: UTC-4 (AST)
  - Summer (DST): UTC-3 (ADT)

North Lake is a geographic parish in York County, New Brunswick, Canada.

Prior to the 2023 governance reform, for governance purposes it formed the local service district of the parish of North Lake, which was a member of the Western Valley Regional Service Commission (WVRSC).

== Origin of name ==
The parish takes its name from the eponymous lake.

== History ==
North Lake was erected in 1879 from Canterbury Parish.

== Boundaries ==
North Lake Parish is bounded:

- on the north by the Carleton County line;
- on the east by a line running up Eel River, including First Eel Lake, Second Eel Lake, and Third Eel Lake, then east-southeasterly across land to La Coote Lake, then down La Coote Lake and Big La Coote Stream to the northern end of Palfrey Lake;
- on the southeast by a line running southwesterly from the southeastern corner of a grant to Abraham Lint west of Allandale Road near the Saint John River to a point west of Sandy Point on Spednic Lake, paralleling the southeastern lines of other parishes south of the Saint John River;
- on the west by the international border, running up Spednic Lake, Grand Lake, the North Lake Thoroughfare, North Lake, and Monument Brook to the Carleton County line.

== Communities ==
Communities at least partly within the parish.

- Forest City
- Fosterville
- Graham Corner
- Green Mountain
- Maxwell
- North Lake
- Pemberton Ridge

== Bodies of water ==
Bodies of water (Note: Not including brooks, ponds or coves.) at least partly within the parish. italics indicate a name no longer in official use

- Eel River
- Big La Coote Stream
- Mud Lake Stream
- Bolton Lake
- more than a dozen other officially named lakes
- Chiputneticook Lakes
  - Grand Lake
  - Mud Lake (Azesko Lake)
  - North Lake
  - North Lake Thoroughfare
  - Spednic Lake

== Islands ==
Islands at least partly within the parish.

- Frog Island
- Pine Island

== Other notable places ==
Parks, historic sites, and other noteworthy places at least partly within the parish.

- First Eel Lake Protected Natural Area
- Hay Brook Protected Natural Area
- Maxwell Protected Natural Area
- Monument Brook Protected Natural Area
- North Lake Protected Natural Area
- Spednic Lake Protected Natural Area
- Tamarack Brook Protected Natural Area

== Demographics ==
=== Population ===
Population trend

Census	Population	Change (%)
2016	233	▼4.1%
2011	243	▼19.0%
2006	300	▲37.6%
2001	218	▲2.3%
1996	213	▼4.9%
1991	224	N/A

=== Language ===
Mother tongue (2016)

Language	Population	Pct (%)
English only	215	91.5%
French only	5	2.1%
Both English and French	0	0%
Other languages	15	6.4%

== See also ==
- List of parishes in New Brunswick
