= Amity, Maine =

Town in Maine, United States

- Town
- Location of Amity, Maine
- Coordinates: 45°53′25″N 67°51′57″W
- Country: United States
- State: Maine
- County: Aroostook
- Villages: North Amity; South Amity

Area
  - Total: 41.72 sq mi (108.05 km^{2})
  - Land: 41.72 sq mi (108.05 km^{2})
  - Water: 0 sq mi (0 km^{2})
- Elevation: 732 ft (223 m)

Population (2020)
  - Total: 253
  - Density: 6.0/sq mi (2.3/km^{2})
- Time zone: UTC-5 (Eastern (EST))
  - Summer (DST): UTC-4 (EDT)
- ZIP code: 04471
- Area code: 207
- FIPS code: 23-01220
- GNIS feature ID: 582324
- Website: https://www.townofamity.com/

Amity is a town in Aroostook County, eastern Maine, United States, near the Canada–United States border. The population was 253 at the 2020 census.

== History ==
Amity was first settled in 1826, and incorporated as a town on March 19, 1836, from township T10 R1 WELS. According to some, the town was named for the 1794 Treaty of “Amity, Commerce, and Navigation between England and the United States,” which aimed to end the boundary dispute between Maine and New Brunswick.

In 1839, after the so-called "Aroostook War" ended with the signing of the Webster–Ashburton Treaty and gave Maine the town, whose ownership had been disputed, surveyors placed a monument in Monument Brook on the Canada–United States border. It served the dual purpose of commemorating the ending of the Aroostook War, and marking Monument Brook, the northernmost source of the Chiputneticook Lakes. The monument still stands today, but lies in a swamp. No roads lead to it and it is accessible only when on foot. An earlier monument, also to mark the northernmost source of the lakes, had consisted of a wooden post with the location engraved on it.

Amity has one building listed on the National Register of Historic Places, the Reed School in North Amity. It has stood for many years, and formerly served not only as a school but as the center of the community, and hosted a singing school, debates, and plays.

== Geography ==
According to the United States Census Bureau, the town has a total area of 41.72 square miles (108.05 km^{2}), all land. The town is bordered on the north by the township of Cary, on the south by the town of Orient, on the west by the unorganized territory of South Aroostook, and on the east by the parishes of North Lake, New Brunswick and Richmond, New Brunswick.

== Demographics ==
Historical population
Census	Pop.	Note	%±
1840	169		—
1850	256		51.5%
1860	302		18.0%
1870	311		3.0%
1880	432		38.9%
1890	420		−2.8%
1900	404		−3.8%
1910	375		−7.2%
1920	393		4.8%
1930	324		−17.6%
1940	345		6.5%
1950	300		−13.0%
1960	206		−31.3%
1970	156		−24.3%
1980	168		7.7%
1990	186		10.7%
2000	199		7.0%
2010	238		19.6%
2020	253		6.3%
U.S. Decennial Census

=== 2010 census ===
As of the census of 2010, there were 238 people, 102 households, and 65 families living in the town. The population density was 5.7 inhabitants per square mile (2.2/km^{2}). There were 162 housing units at an average density of 3.9 per square mile (1.5/km^{2}). The racial makeup of the town was 99.2% White, 0.4% Native American, and 0.4% from two or more races.

There were 102 households, of which 25.5% had children under the age of 18 living with them, 49.0% were married couples living together, 7.8% had a female householder with no husband present, 6.9% had a male householder with no wife present, and 36.3% were non-families. 27.5% of all households were made up of individuals, and 7.9% had someone living alone who was 65 years of age or older. The average household size was 2.33 and the average family size was 2.71.

The median age in the town was 45.9 years. 19.3% of residents were under the age of 18; 7.7% were between the ages of 18 and 24; 20.1% were from 25 to 44; 39.6% were from 45 to 64; and 13.4% were 65 years of age or older. The gender makeup of the town was 52.5% male and 47.5% female.

=== 2000 census ===
As of the census of 2000, there were 199 people, 77 households, and 62 families living in the town. The population density was 4.7 people per square mile (1.8/km^{2}). There were 122 housing units at an average density of 2.9 per square mile (1.1/km^{2}). The racial makeup of the town was 98.99% White, 0.50% African American, and 0.50% from two or more races.

There were 77 households, out of which 32.5% had children under the age of 18 living with them, 72.7% were married couples living together, 7.8% had a female householder with no husband present, and 18.2% were non-families. 14.3% of all households were made up of individuals, and 1.3% had someone living alone who was 65 years of age or older. The average household size was 2.58 and the average family size was 2.81.

In the town, the population was spread out, with 26.1% under the age of 18, 5.0% from 18 to 24, 27.6% from 25 to 44, 32.2% from 45 to 64, and 9.0% who were 65 years of age or older. The median age was 38 years. For every 100 females, there were 99.0 males. For every 100 females age 18 and over, there were 101.4 males.

The median income for a household in the town was $26,667, and the median income for a family was $26,667. Males had a median income of $26,458 versus $16,250 for females. The per capita income for the town was $13,484. About 13.3% of families and 15.0% of the population were below the poverty line, including 27.5% of those under the age of eighteen and none of those sixty five or over.

== Notable people ==
- Samantha Smith, childhood ambassador and peace activist (born in Houlton)
- Thayne Ormsby, man convicted in the triple murder of two men and a child in 2010 (born in Ellsworth)
