= Bolton Lake (New Brunswick) =

Lake in New Brunswick, Canada

- Location within New Brunswick
- Location: North Lake Parish, York County, New Brunswick
- Coordinates: 45°42′01″N 67°35′07″W
- Primary inflows: Gobbler Brook
- Primary outflows: Bolton Brook
- Basin countries: Canada
- Max. length: 2.9 km (1.8 mi)
- Max. width: 1.8 km (1.1 mi)
- Surface elevation: 162 m (531 ft)

Bolton Lake is a lake in the St. Croix River drainage basin in York County, New Brunswick, Canada. It is about 2.9 kilometres (1.8 mi) long and 1.8 kilometres (1.1 mi) wide, and lies at an elevation of 162 metres (531 ft). The lake is about 9 kilometres (6 mi) north of the border with the United States.

The primary inflow is Gobbler Brook, and the primary outflow is Bolton Brook to Silas Cove on Spednic Lake, part of the St. Croix River system, which flows into Passamaquoddy Bay on the Bay of Fundy.

== See also ==
- List of lakes of New Brunswick
