= Transport in Canterbury =

Transport in Canterbury may refer to:

- Transport in Canterbury, Kent, United Kingdom
- Transport in Canterbury, New Brunswick, Canada
- Transport in Canterbury, New South Wales, Australia
- Transport in Canterbury, New Zealand
