= Canterbury Parish, New Brunswick =

Canterbury
- Parish
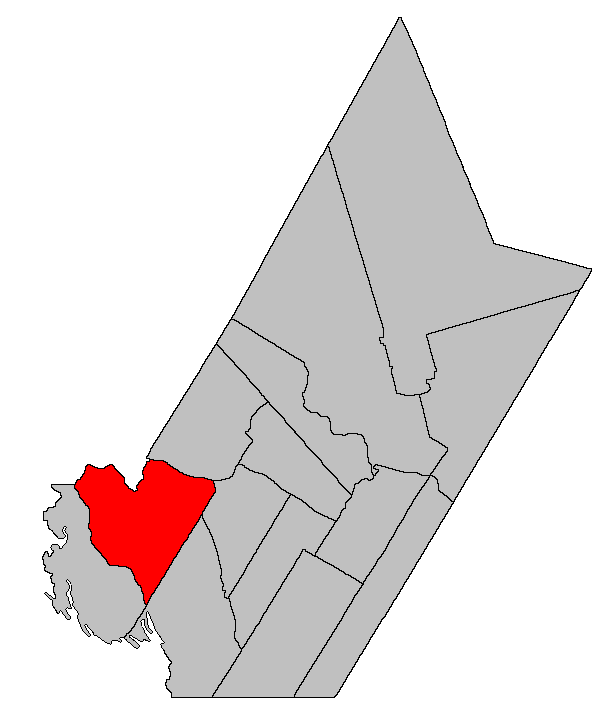
- Location within York County, New Brunswick.
- Coordinates: 45.845°N 67.535°W
- Country: Canada
- Province: New Brunswick
- County: York
- Erected: 1855

Area
  - Land: 550.70 km^{2} (212.63 sq mi)

Population (2021)
  - Total: 552
  - Density: 1/km^{2} (2.6/sq mi)
  - Change 2016-2021: ▲5.1%
  - Dwellings: 419
- Time zone: UTC-4 (AST)
  - Summer (DST): UTC-3 (ADT)
- Figures do not include portions within the villages of Canterbury and Meductic

Canterbury is a geographic parish in York County, New Brunswick, Canada.

Prior to the 2023 governance reform, for governance purposes it was divided between the villages of Canterbury and Meductic and the local service districts of Benton and the parish of Canterbury, all of which were members of the Western Valley Regional Service Commission (WVRSC).

== Origin of name ==
The parish was named in honour of John Manners-Sutton, Lieutenant Governor of New Brunswick at the time and later 3rd Viscount Canterbury following the death of his brother. Manners Sutton Parish (originally Manners-Sutton) was erected at the same time.

== History ==
Canterbury was erected in 1855 from Dumfries Parish. An oversight omits Falls Island in the Saint John River, leaving it outside the boundaries of both Canterbury and Dumfries.

In 1879 the rear of Canterbury was erected as North Lake Parish.

In 1957 Fall Island in the Saint John River was stated to belong to Canterbury.

== Boundaries ==
Canterbury Parish is bounded:

- on the north by the Carleton County line, running through Eel River, then by the Saint John River;
- on the east by the eastern line of a grant to Abraham Lint, west of Allandale Road;
- on the southeast by a line beginning at the southeastern corner of the Lint grant and running southeasterly to the northern end of Palfrey Lake, paralleling the southeastern lines of other parishes south of the Saint John River;
- on the west and northwest by a line running up Big La Coote Stream to La Coote Lake, then running north-northwesterly across land to Third Eel Lake, then down Eel River, including Second Eel Lake and First Eel Lake, to the Carleton County line.

== Communities ==
Communities at least partly within the parish. bold indicates an incorporated municipality

- Benton
- **Canterbury**
- Carroll Ridge
- Dead Creek
- Deer Lake
- Dorrington Hill
- Dow Settlement
- Eel River Lake
- Hartin Settlement
- Johnson Settlement
- Marne
- **Meductic**
- Middle Southampton
- Ritchie
- Scott Siding
- Skiff Lake
- Temple

== Bodies of water ==
Bodies of water (Note: Not including brooks, ponds or coves.) at least partly within the parish.

- Eel River
- Saint John River
  - Pokiok Reach
- Big La Coote Stream
- Little La Coote Stream
- Pocowogamis Stream
- Shogomoc Stream
- Dead Creek
- Sullivan Creek
- Mactaquac Lake
- Palfrey Lake
- Skiff Lake
- more than twenty other officially named lakes

== Islands ==
Islands at least partly within the parish.

- Burnt Island
- Carr Island
- Club Island
- Dibblees Island
- Halfway Island
- Mill Island
- Northcott Island
- Wilson Island

== Other notable places ==
Parks, historic sites, and other noteworthy places at least partly within the parish.

- Big Falls Protected Natural Area
- Dead Creek Protected Natural Area
- Eel River Falls
- Eel River Protected Natural Area
- Estey Wetlands Protected Natural Area
- First Eel Lake Protected Natural Area
- Maxwell Protected Natural Area
- Oak Mountain Protected Natural Area
- Pocowogamis Stream Protected Natural Area
- Risteen Brook Protected Natural Area
- Skiff Lake Protected Natural Area

== Demographics ==
Parish population total does not include the former incorporated village of Canterbury and the portion within the former incorporated village of Meductic. Revised census figures based on the 2023 local governance reforms have not been released.

=== Population ===
**Population trend**

Census	Population	Change (%)
2016	525	▼13.8%
2011	609	▲9.7%
2006	555	▼5.5%
2001	587	▼0.3%
1996Adj	589	▼3.0%
1996	607	▲5.0%
1991	578	N/A

=== Language ===
**Mother tongue (2016)**

Language	Population	Pct (%)
English only	495	94.2%
French only	15	2.9%
Both English and French	15	2.9%
Other languages	0	0.00%

== See also ==
- List of parishes in New Brunswick
