= Sabian Cymbals =

Canadian cymbal manufacturing company

Coordinates: 45°59′39.93″N 67°28′44.13″W

Sabian
- Company type: Private
- Industry: Musical instruments
- Founded: 1981; 45 years ago in Meductic, Canada
- Founder: Robert Zildjian
- Headquarters: Lakeland Ridges, New Brunswick, Canada
- Key people: Andy Zildjian (president/CEO); Sally Zildjian-Teague
- Products: Cymbals, crotales, zills, gongs, mark trees, triangles, thunder sheets
- Brands: Crescent
- Website: sabian.com

Sabian (/ˈseɪbɪən/ SAY-bee-ən) is a Canadian cymbal manufacturing company based in New Brunswick. It was established in 1981 in the village of Meductic, which is now part of Lakeland Ridges, where the company is still headquartered. Sabian is considered one of the big four manufacturers of cymbals, along with Zildjian, Meinl and Paiste.

== History ==
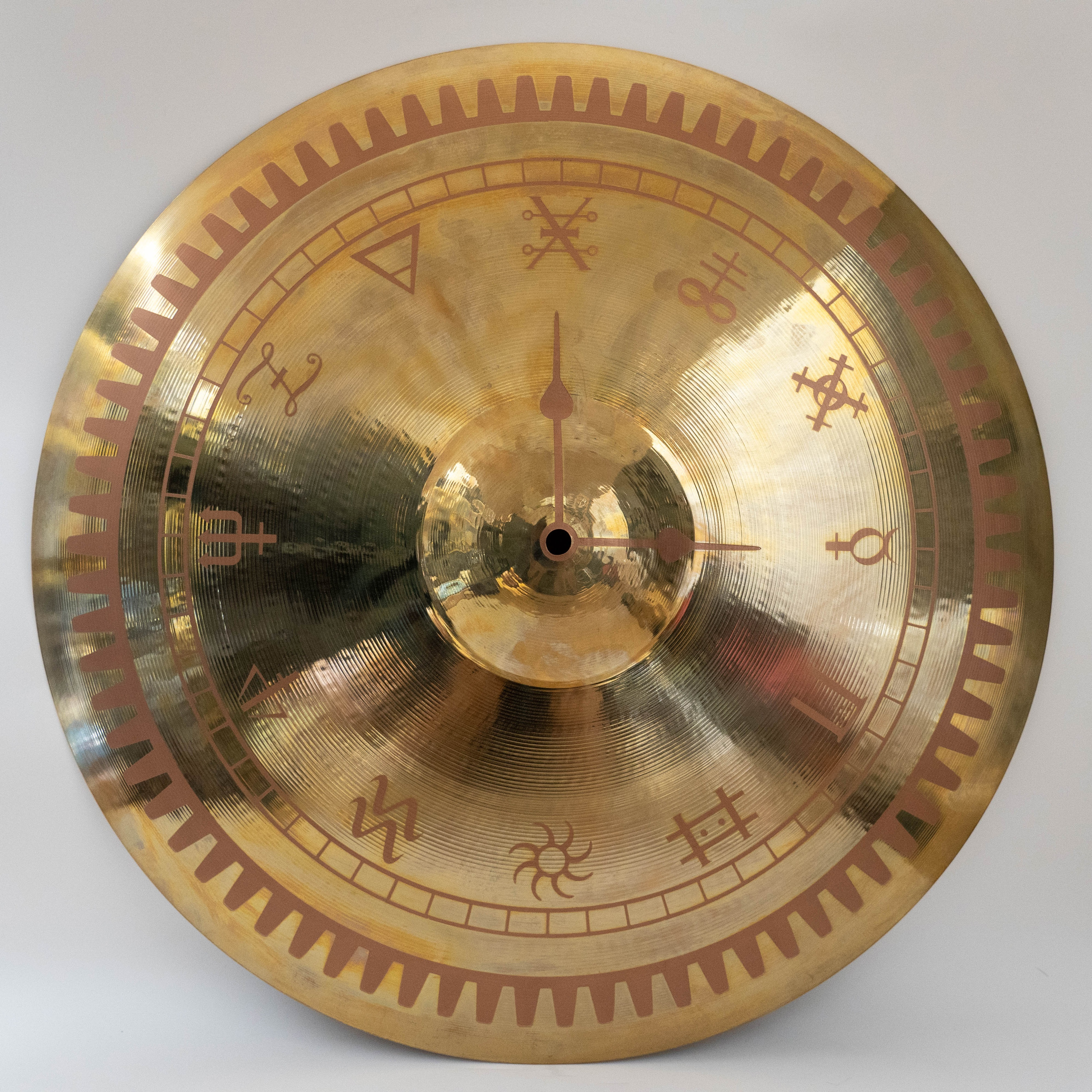
22" limited edition ride cymbal, Paragon line

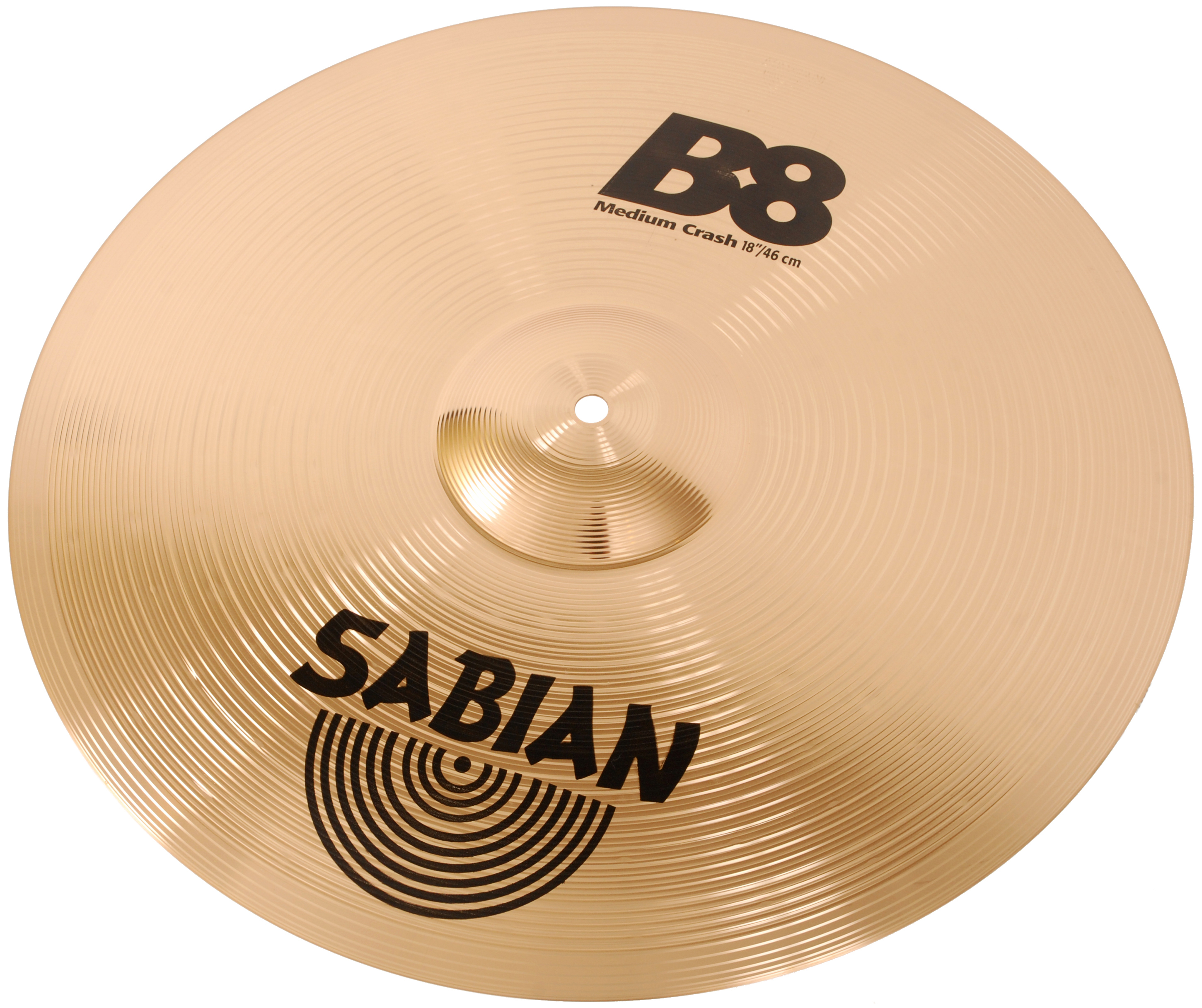
18" low price crash cymbal

Before Sabian Cymbals was founded, its current manufacturing facility was operated by Azco, which was then a subsidiary of Avedis Zildjian. In 1968, the Zildjian company set up Azco and the plant in rural Meductic, New Brunswick under persuasion from Robert Zildjian, who, beginning in the late 1940s, had grown familiar with the area from going on salmon fishing trips. Initially, the Meductic plant was used for casting and rolling cymbals, while finishing work was done at the Zildjian plant in North Quincy, Massachusetts. By 1970, the Meductic facility handled both processes and produced about 40% of the company's output.

After a dispute with his brother Armand following their father Avedis's death in 1979, Robert left the family business. In 1981, he founded Sabian, naming the new company by combining the first two letters of his three children's names—Sally, Billy, and Andy. The Zildjian company's former operations in Meductic under 'Azco' became the headquarters of the new company.

In 1982, Sabian introduced the Automatic Anvil (AA) and the Hand Hammered (HH) lines, producing 45,000 cymbals in the first year.

By 1987, Sabian was exporting 90% of their product, additionally receiving endorsements and special visits from percussionists including Gerry Brown, Martin Drew and Kiss drummer Peter Criss. In 1989, Sabian produced its first signature artist cymbals, the Jack DeJohnette ride/hi-hats, and the Carmine Appice Silver Nickel Chinese. Eight years later, due to rising demand, a larger plant was opened in Meductic.

Sabian introduced the HHX series in 2001 which brought in the Manhattan's darker hammering techniques. In 2011, with the help of Jojo Mayer, Sabian produced the OMNI series, which was the product of years of research and development.

Sabian cymbals are still made in New Brunswick. Robert's son Andy is the most recent president of Sabian. In January 2015, the company announced the acquisition of US cymbal manufacturer, Crescent Cymbals, moving all its production to Sabian's factory in Canada, subsequently incorporating Crescent into its list of brands.

In 2017, Sabian sponsored "The Capital Project Presents: The Final Concert", a music and film event in Fredericton, New Brunswick, making the event free of charge. Refunds were offered to people who had already purchased tickets.
