= Hartin Settlement, New Brunswick =

Rural community in New Brunswick, Canada

Hartin Settlement
- Settlement
- Location in New Brunswick
- Coordinates: 45.89598°N 67.54105°W
- Country: Canada
- Province: New Brunswick
- Parish: Canterbury
- County: York
- Established: 1865
- Founder: Thomas Hartin

Hartin Settlement is a small rural community in western York County, New Brunswick, Canada. Formerly a farming community, it is now home to approximately twenty families. It is located near Canterbury, New Brunswick.

== History ==
The settlement is named for Thomas Robinson Hartin Sr. Reverend, who encouraged people to settle in this area in 1865. It was settled primarily by Episcopalians from different parts of the province. The petition by Thomas Hartin to found the settlement was signed in 1862 by Surveyor General, John McMillan.

By 1866, Hartin Settlement was a farming community with approximately 26 families. Most of these families survived off of small farms on their land. During this time every land owner had to clear trees and have a building on their property. The community also had to work together to maintain the road.

Hartin Settlement had a schoolhouse for grades one to eight. The Chief Superintendent of Education noted it as: "This school is well equipped and does very good work" Being a rural school, it closed in 1967 due to the Equal Opportunity Program and was demolished in 1983/84.

In 1889, a total of 5 people had been infected by an outbreak of diphtheria.

On 25 November 1886, Elisha Lewis found an unknown man's body near Hartin Settlement at a location now known as Dead Man's Corner. Because he could not be identified by the coroner, a description was posted in the Press Newspaper on 8 December 1886: "Deceased was about 5 feet 8 inches in height, and about 65 years of age. He wore a brown reefer, lined with blue flannel, no vest, colored pants, blue woolen outside shirt, plaided homespun inside shirt and drawers; he had on an old pair of boots, and wore a brown woolen cap. A black felt hat, and pocketbook containing $2.39, was found on his person." This description matched that of a fugitive from Maine named Calvin Graves, who was being pursued for the murder of two game wardens in Maine. This unknown male was the first to be buried in the Hartin Settlement Cemetery, because no one could determine his religious denomination.

From about 1886-1933 members of the Annis family who died were buried in the Hartin Settlement cemetery alongside members of the Oliver family, and the unknown man. The cemetery wasn't kept up well, and it was soon overgrown. The first attempt to restore it was made in the 1940s, and again around 1972. In 1979, people of the community began restoring it again and found out some of the forgotten names of people buried there. Finally in 2016, it was fully cleared, and even more people were found there amounting to ten in total.

Hartin Settlement got power in 1950, and around this time about 104 people lived in the community.

== Notable people ==
=== Rev. Thomas Robinson Hartin ===
Thomas Hartin Rev. was born in Ireland (1815) and sailed to Canada in 1832. He was ordained 15 June 1851, at Christ Church Cathedral in Fredericton by John Medley, Bishop of Fredericton, and became a priest on 21 February 1869.

In 1865 he encouraged people to form Hartin Settlement 4.29 km WNW of Canterbury. On 11 September 1875 he & his wife gave 600 acres of their land for the building of Holy Trinity Church in Canterbury, which is still in existence and active today.

He died on 21 January 1891 at his home in Canterbury Station. He is buried in the Parish Cemetery, Canterbury.

Families that have lived in Hartin Settlement==	
	* Annis
	* Hartin
	* Oliver
	* Irvine
	* Wright
	* Nicholson
	* Norton
	* McCusker
	* Anderson
	* Lindsay
	* Scott
	* McPherson
	* Harten
	* Alton/Altan
	* Crosvenor
	* Lowry
	* Furrow
	* Glidden
	* Connally
	* Poole
	* Lindsay

== People in the Hartin Settlement Cemetery ==
Irvine, Robert

Annis, Rebecca 4 June 1842 – 23 December 1921

Annis, William D. 1830 - 19 February 1890

Annis, Charles S. 6 January 1863 – 21 March 1933

Annis, Joseph T. 1870 - Unknown

Annis, Sadie

Oliver, Alecta

Oliver Twins

Unknown Male

== Geography ==
Located 4.29 km WNW of Canterbury: Canterbury Parish, York County

Area: About 105.21827 km

Contains Little Mud Lake, and Arrons Stream

Originally divided into 26 plots of land of 100 acres each.

== See also ==
- List of communities in New Brunswick
