= Crescent Cymbals =

US musical instrument manufacturing company

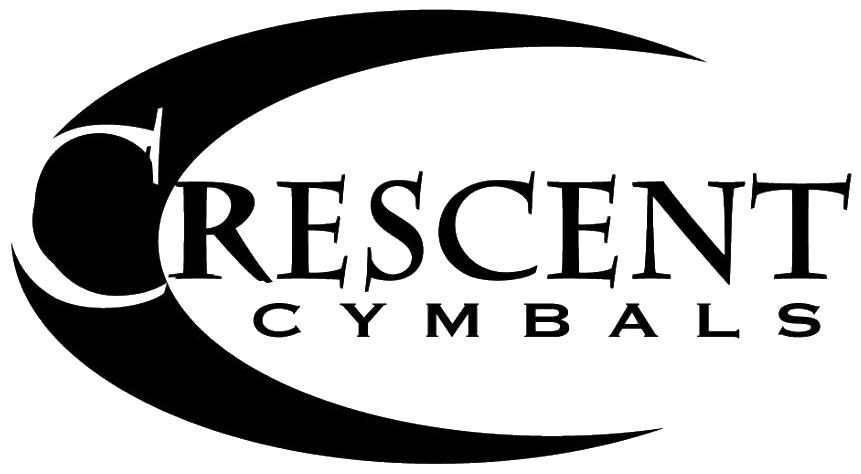
- Type: Private (2012–15); Brand (2015–present)
- Industry: Musical Instruments
- Founded: 2012
- Defunct: 2015; 11 years ago
- Fate: Company and brand name acquired by Sabian in 2015, all production moved to Canada
- Headquarters: Kennesaw, United States
- Key people: Michael Vosbein (CEO) (–2015)
- Products: Cymbals
- Owner: Sabian
- Website: sabian.com/crescent

Crescent Cymbals is a former US musical instrument manufacturing company headquartered in Kennesaw, Georgia that produced cymbals.

In 2015, the company was acquired by Sabian, becoming a brand of it. Cymbals with the "Crescent" tradename have been manufactured and commercialized by Sabian since then.

== History ==
The Crescent Cymbals brand was launched in 2012 by Cymbal Masters, a company founded by drummers Michael Vosbein, Stanton Moore, Jeff Hamilton, and Bill Norman.

Their cymbals originally produced in Istanbul, Turkey. On January 15, 2014, Crescent announced an alliance with Canadian cymbal manufacturer Sabian, with a stated goal of expanding the number of series they offer by producing cymbals on two continents to meet expected demand. Since that time, all production has been moved to Sabian.

In January 2015, the company Cymbal Masters and the brand "Crescent Cymbals" were sold to Sabian, who assumed all ongoing operations of the Crescent brand. Production moved to the Sabian factory of Lakeland Ridges, New Brunswick, while all Crescent endorsors were welcomed into the Sabian family of artists. Since then, Sabian has re-released several Crescent models including the Vanguard, Elements, and the signature series from both Jeff Hamilton and Stanton Moore.
