= Monument One =

Boundary marker on the Canada–USA border

- Interactive map of Monument One
- Location: Monument Brook, Amity, Maine
- Coordinates: 45.9434°N 67.7812°W
- Type: boundary marker
- Material: cast iron obelisk, concrete base
- Height: 14 feet (4.3 m)
- Beginning date: 1797
- Completion date: 1843
- Restored date: 1972

Monument One is a boundary marker on the Maine–New Brunswick border in the town of Amity, Maine. It was erected in 1843, the first permanent marker on the Canada–United States border.

== Construction ==
Surveyors erected the first marker in 1797, consisting of iron hoops around a yellow birch tree, with a stake in the ground nearby.

A square cedar post was installed on July 31, 1817. The permanent cast iron marker was installed in 1843, after the signing of the Webster–Ashburton Treaty. A concrete base was added in 1972.

== Inscriptions ==
The inscription on one side reads "Treaty of Washington, Boundary August 9th, 1842". On the other two sides of the marker are the names of the US and British Commissioners, Lieutenant James B. B. Estcourt and Albert Smith.

== Location ==
Monument One marks the headwaters of the St. Croix River and the south end of the "North Line", which runs straight north for 78 miles (126 km). It is at the western corner of Richmond Parish and North Lake Parish and near the rural community of Monument.

== Access ==
Access is difficult, as no main roads run to the site. A logging road, accessible from Monument Road, passes nearby, but there is no path to the monument, only a trail marked by pink ribbons. Crossing a wetland area is necessary to approach the monument itself.
