= Skiff Lake (New Brunswick) =

Unincorporated community in Canada

- Location within New Brunswick
- Location: Canterbury Parish, York County, New Brunswick, Canada
- Coordinates: 45°49′19.2″N 67°31′30″W
- Type: Glacier lake
- Islands: 27

Skiff Lake is a lake in Canterbury Parish, York County, New Brunswick, Canada.

== Location ==
Skiff Lake is a glacier lake in southwestern New Brunswick, Canada, near the village of Lakeland Ridges. There are 27 islands scattered throughout the lake. Surrounding the lake are large granite boulders which may have been formed from one of the eruptions of Mount Pleasant Caldera.

== History ==
Skiff Lake was named by Lord Northcote in 18??, who paddled a skiff over to an island that he had claimed. This island is now known as Northcote island. A cottage was built on Northcote island which was the first camp on an island on Skiff Lake. There is a camp named "Lady of the Lake" that is the oldest camp on the lake, on the eastern shore of the lake.

There haves been several outfitters on Skiff Lake. These include: Crombies camps, Foulke Camps, Skiff Lake Outfitters, Skiff Lake Inn.

== Fish species ==
Fish found in the lake include: Land-locked salmon, Smallmouth bass, Brook trout, American eel, White perch, white sucker, Burbot aka cusk, Smelts, Sunfish, and pickerel.

== Other animals ==
Non-fish species found on or around the lake include: loon, mallard, black duck, common merganser, tern, ruby-throated hummingbird, common snapping turtle, red fox, bald eagle, pileated woodpecker, white tail deer, moose, black bear, beaver, American mink, blue jay, and Canada goose.

== Myths and legends ==
There have long been rumours that Skiff Lake has its very own Nessy. This lake-locked serpent, affectionately referred to as Gertrude, is rumoured to have been upwards of thirty feet in length.

== Ice out dates ==
Year	Month/Day	Year	Month/Day	Year	Month/Day
1923	2 May			1933	2 May
1934	5 May	1935	8 May	1936	1 May
1937	4 May	1938	25 Apr	1939	30 Apr
1940	8 May	1941	9 May	1942	4 May
1943	10 May	1944	6 May	1945	7 May
1946	4 May	1947	8 May	1948	9 May
1949	20 Apr	1950	29 Apr	1951	23 Apr
1952	29 Apr	1953	22 Apr	1954	1 May
1955	29 Apr	1956	6 May	1957	30 Apr
1958	25 Apr	1959	6 May	1960	4 May
1961	4 May	1962	30 Apr	1963	5 May
1964	2 May	1965	2 May	1966	26 Apr
1967	7 May	1968	25 Apr	1969	Unknown
1970	4 May	1971	12 May	1972	15 May
1973	30 Apr	1974	2 May	1975	10 May
1976	23 Apr	1977	4 May	1978	8 May
1979	27 Apr	1980	5 May	1981	14 Apr
1982	3 May	1983	19 Apr	1984	1 May
1985	25 Apr	1986	23 Apr	1987	18 Apr
1988	23 Apr	1989	5 May	1990	27 Apr
1991	30 Apr	1992	8 May	1993	30 Apr
1994	2 May	1995	3 May	1996	26 Apr
1997	7 May	1998	20 Apr	1999	24 Apr
2000	15 Apr	2001	4 May	2002	26 Apr
2003	6 May	2004	24 Apr	2005	25 Apr
2006	5 Apr	2007	14 Apr	2008	5 May
2009	28 Apr	2010	10 Apr	2011	28 Apr
2012	12 Apr	2013	26 Apr	2014	4 May
2015	29 Apr	2016	15 Apr	2017	30 Apr
2018	5 May	2019	4 May	2020	30 Apr
2021	12 Apr	2022	19 Apr	2023	27 Apr
2024	16 Apr	2025	20 Apr	2026	17 Apr
2027		2028		2029	

== See also ==
- List of lakes of New Brunswick

== See also ==
- List of communities in New Brunswick
- Local municipality: Lakeland Ridges
