= Armand Zildjian =

American musical instrument maker (1921–2002)

Armand Zildjian (February 18, 1921 – December 26, 2002) was an American manufacturer of cymbals and the head of the Avedis Zildjian Company.

Born in Milton, Massachusetts, Armand Zildjian was the first Zildjian to be born in the United States. Armand was the heir of a cymbal-making tradition that dated back to his ancestor Avedis, who began the company in 1623 in Istanbul. By family tradition, the secrets of cymbal making were passed on only to the oldest son, but Armand's father, Avedis Zildjian III, gave the information to both of his sons, Armand and Robert. Two years before his death, Avedis appointed Armand President of the Avedis Zildjian Company. Subsequently Robert decided to go into the cymbal business himself forming the Sabian Cymbal Company, in competition with his brother.

Armand Zildjian attended Colgate University, and served with the United States Coast Guard in the Pacific during World War II. After the war, he returned to his father's factory in Quincy, Massachusetts, where, with the help of such music drumming stars as Chick Webb and Gene Krupa, Avedis and Armand revolutionized the cymbal business by adapting cymbals for drum sets by making them thinner.

Zildjian has an honorary degree from Berklee College of Music, is an inductee into the Percussive Hall of Fame, and has his name immortalized on the Guitar Center Rock Walk in Hollywood, California.

Armand Zildjian died on December 26, 2002, at his home in Scottsdale, Arizona.
