= Forest City, Maine =

- Populated place
- Location within Maine Location within the United States
- Coordinates: 45°39′35″N 67°43′47″W
- Country: United States
- State: Maine
- County: Washington
- Elevation: 460 ft (140 m)
- Time zone: UTC-5 (Eastern (EST))
  - Summer (DST): UTC-4 (EDT)
- Area code: 207

Forest City is a populated place in Washington County, Maine, United States.

The community has the unusual distinction of sharing its name with the community of Forest City immediately across the Canada–United States border in the province of New Brunswick.

The community houses the Forest City Border Crossing and a small water control dam on the Chiputneticook Lakes. Both Forest Cities use the same Baptist church and cemetery, both of which are on the New Brunswick side.

== Education ==
The Maine Department of Education takes responsibility for coordinating school assignments in the unorganized territory.
