= Reed School =

- U.S. National Register of Historic Places
- Location within Maine Location within the United States
- Location: US 1, 0.1 mi. S of jct. with Lycette Rd., North Amity, Maine
- Coordinates: 45°56′26″N 67°49′49″W
- Area: less than one acre
- Built: 1870
- Architectural style: Late Victorian
- NRHP reference No.: 01001270
- Added to NRHP: November 29, 2001

The Reed School is a historic school building on United States Route 1 in North Amity, Maine. Built (or significantly altered) in the 1870s, it is one of Maine's dwindling number of one-room district schoolhouses. It served the town until its schools were consolidated in 1971, and has since been used for a variety of municipal functions. It was listed on the National Register of Historic Places in 2001.

== Description and history ==
The Reed School is set on the east side of United States Route 1 in the dispersed rural village of North Amity, located near the Canada–US border in eastern Maine. It is set near the road, just south of its junction with Lycette Road. It is a single-story wood frame structure, with a gabled roof, clapboard siding, and a rubblestone foundation. A small ell extends to the rear of the main block. There are two entrances, one set on the street-facing western facade, the other on the south side. The western entrance is sheltered by a shed-roofed vestibule, while the southern one is sheltered by a hip-roofed portico. To its right is a bank of five sash windows. The interior is finished with wainscoting to a height of four feet, with painted plaster walls and ceiling. The rear ell, which contains the outhouse, is finished in horizontal boards.

The land on which the school stands was purchased by the town from Robert Ryan in 1858, but it had long been in the hands of the Reed family, which had extensive holdings in the area. It is believed that the school was moved to this lot from another location, as there had been a Reed School in operation since at least 1837. The building has undergone a number of alterations: historic photos show that it once had a bell mounted on the roof, and that its western facade had windows that it now lacks. The latter is believed to be a change made sometime between 1916 and 1931. The school was eventually made a part of the Hodgdon school system, and was closed and deeded back to the town in 1971. The building was (as reported at the time of its listing on the National Register of Historic Places in 2001) in use as a polling place, and has also been used as a temporary home for town offices.

== See also ==
- National Register of Historic Places listings in Aroostook County, Maine
