= Green Mountain, New Brunswick =

Coordinates: 47.774109°N 67.754015°W

Green Mountain is a rural community in York County, New Brunswick, Canada.

Green Mountain is known for its scenic views of the surrounding area of northwestern New Brunswick and adjacent northeastern Maine, including Mount Katahdin (Maine's highest mountain) and East Grand Lake which is bisected by the International Boundary.

== History ==
Green Mountain has its roots in the farming and forestry industries, with much of the mountain being cleared in the early-to-mid-19th century to allow for such industry to expand and grow. The community had a school, post office, and church to serve the needs of the population.

As time wore on, the population dwindled and farming became less attractive with the rocky and clay soil conditions. Today, forestry and construction are the only means of employment for the community's small population. Many of the residents commute to locations as far away as Fredericton and Woodstock to work. Home construction boomed in the mid and late 1990s as several new cottages were constructed on the shores of East Grand Lake.

Today, few people reside in the small border community, with the number of summer cottage owners likely surpassing the number of full-time residents.

The following is how Inez (Foster) Lounder described the community as recorded in her notes December 20, 1910:

Green Mountain is situated on the Eastern bank of the Grand Chipineticook Lake, Grand Lake being one of the lakes that form part of the boundary line between the Province of New Brunswick and the State of Maine. The place is about 22 miles from Lakeland Ridges and about 18 miles from Danforth and Forest Station; the latter two stations being situated on the line of the Maine Central Railroad Company in the State of Maine.

The first settler that came to this place was Elias Foster in the year of 1853. When he first came here he lived in a log house on the farm occupied now by W.B. Foster. He lived there about a year and then moved up to the farm occupied now by J.L. Foster. He and his wife and two children lived there for two years with no settlers any nearer than Foster's Corner—now called Fosterville—with the exception of two young men who lived here in the summer seasons on the farms occupied now by H.H. Veysey and George McMinn. The next settler that came was William Rollins who lived on the farm occupied now by Whiteford Peck.

About three years after the first settler came, other settlers began to come in quite quickly.

In the year 1863, Henry Pray and George Robinson came here and moved to what is called the Balm of Gilead Point. They lived there for a while when they sold out and other settlers began to come in.

When the first settlers came here there were no roads, only sled roads from here to Fosterville. From here to Canterbury there were no roads only a spotted line. After a few years roads were made between here and Canterbury Station.

The mail came in once a week and it was carried part way by a team and the rest of the way on foot by Samuel Cropley. The North Lake Post Office was located at that time what is now called Fosterville and it was kept by William Foster. About the year 1876 it was transferred to Green Mountain and kept by J.R. Foster for about 10 years. It was then transferred to H.H. Veysey where it is kept at the present.

An article in The Daily Gleaner, the daily newspaper from Fredericton, author unknown, described Green Mountain as a scenic community with a blacksmith shop and a couple of stores. Lumbering and farming were the main industries. Although the land was extremely rocky, farmers were gradually clearing the land by using dynamite on the rocks and stumps. Obviously, farming was not the main attraction that drew settlers to Green Mountain.

== See also ==
- List of communities in New Brunswick
