= Zildjian =

Musical instruments

Coordinates: 42°9′42.30″N 70°53′11.15″W

- Type: Private
- Industry: Musical Instruments
- Founded: 1623; 403 years ago in Constantinople, Ottoman Empire
- Founder: Avedis Zildjian
- Headquarters: Norwell, Massachusetts, United States
- Key people: List: Craigie Zildjian (executive); Debbie Zildjian (vice president); John Stephans (CEO)
- Products: Cymbals, drumsticks, gongs, crotales, zills
- Brands: List: Zildjian; Vic Firth; Balter Mallets
- Website: zildjian.com

The Avedis Zildjian Company, simply known as Zildjian (/ˈzɪldʒən, -dʒiən/), is a musical instrument manufacturer specializing in cymbals and other percussion instruments. Founded in Constantinople in 1623, the company is the world's largest maker of cymbals and drumsticks, the world's oldest manufacturer of musical instruments, and one of the world's oldest continuously operating companies.

The company was founded in the 17th-century Ottoman Empire by Avedis Zildjian, an ethnic Armenian whose family moved the company to the United States in the 20th century. Now based in Norwell, Massachusetts, Zildjian sells cymbals, drumsticks, percussion mallets and other drum accessories under the Zildjian, Vic Firth, and Balter Mallet brands.

== History ==
=== Beginnings ===
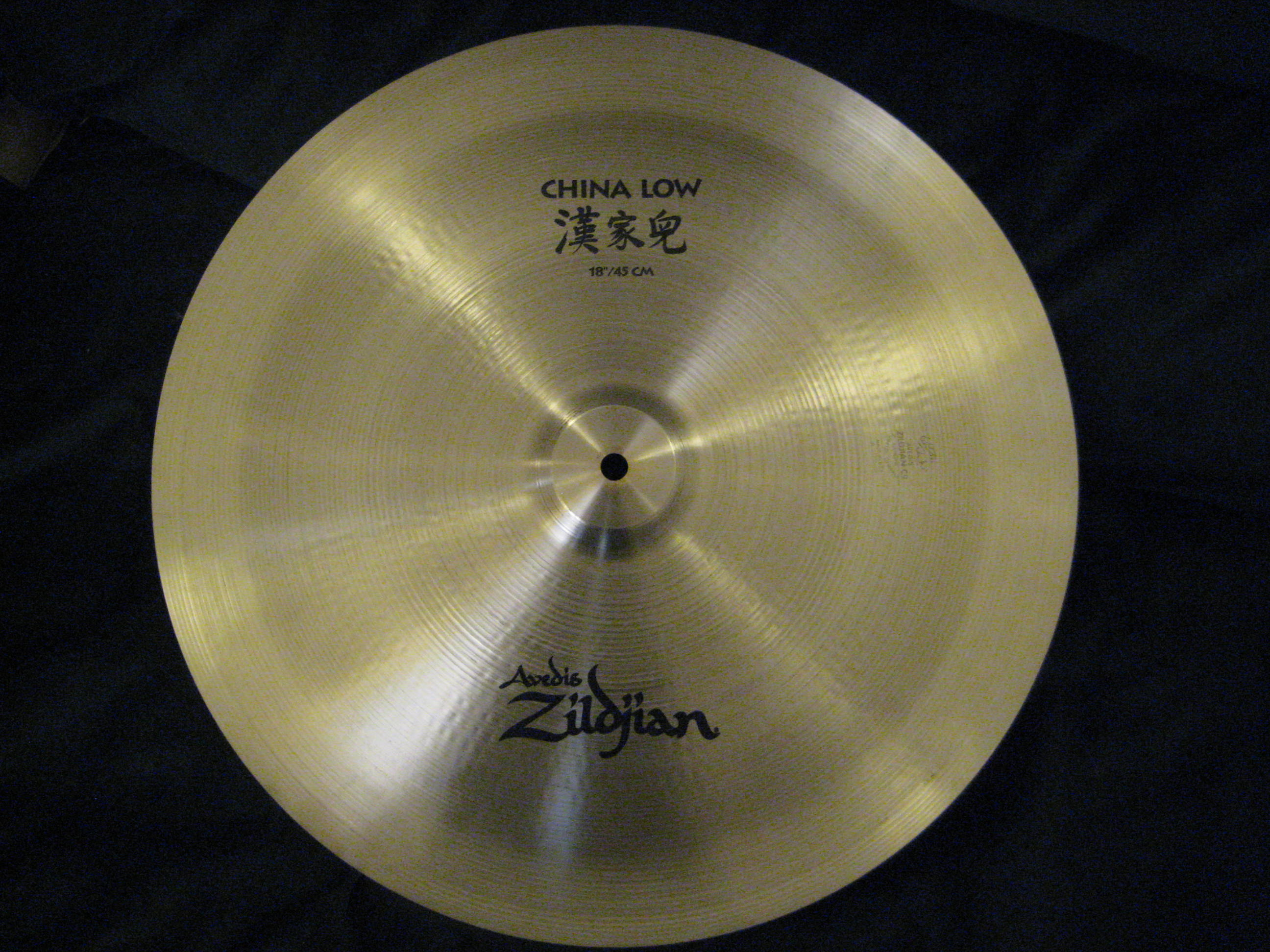
18" China cymbal

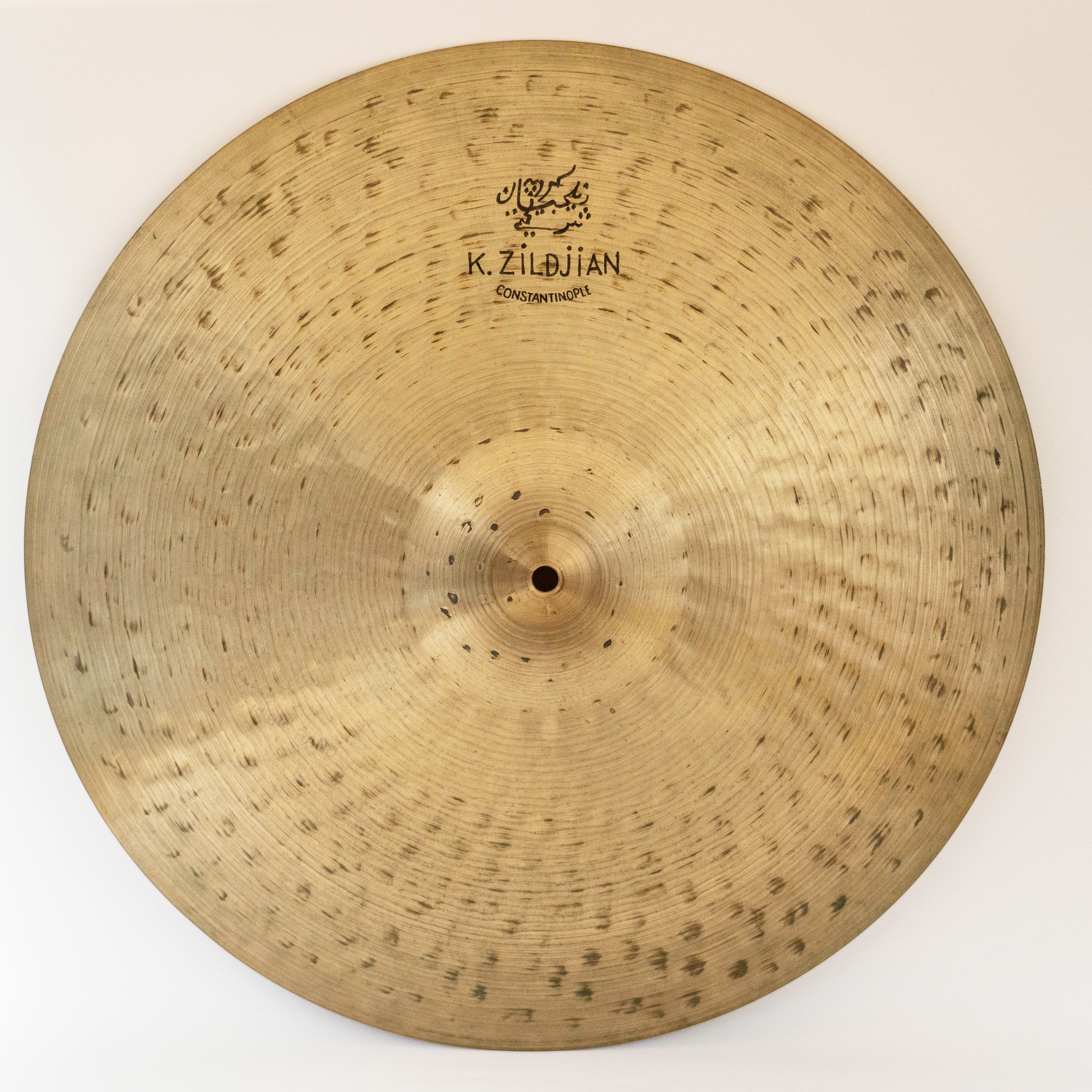
21" K Constantinople ride

The first Zildjian cymbals were created in 1618 by Avedis Zildjian, an Armenian metalsmith and alchemist. Like his metalsmith father, he worked for the court of the Sultan of the Ottoman Empire in Constantinople. He made an alloy of tin, copper, and silver into a sheet of metal that could make musical sounds without shattering. Sultan Mustafa I gave Avedis eighty gold pieces and officially recognized the surname Zilciyan or Zildjian, meaning "Son of a Cymbal Maker" or "Family of Cymbalsmiths" in Armenian (with zil being Turkish for "cymbal", ci meaning "maker", and ian being the Armenian suffix meaning "son of"). In 1623, the Sultan granted him permission to leave the palace to start his own business in the Armenian sector of Constantinople, called Psamatia.

Zildjian's shop manufactured cymbals for the mehter, Ottoman military bands consisting of wind and percussion instruments, which belonged to the Janissaries. Mehter ensembles, which were known in the West primarily for playing in battle, also performed courtly music for Ottoman rulers. The Zildjians also produced instruments for Greek and Armenian churches, Sufi dervishes, and belly dancers of the Ottoman harem, who wore finger cymbals.

After Avedis died, the business, and the secret for producing the metal, was handed down through several generations of male heirs. In the early 19th century, Haroutune Zildjian passed it to his son Avedis II. In 1850, Avedis II built a 25-foot schooner to ship his cymbals to trade exhibitions such as the Great Exhibition in London, and to supply musicians in Europe. He died in 1865, and since his sons were too young, his brother Kerope II took over the company. He introduced a line of instruments called K Zildjian, which are used by classical musicians to this day. Kerope II died in 1909 in Constantinople.

=== 20th century ===
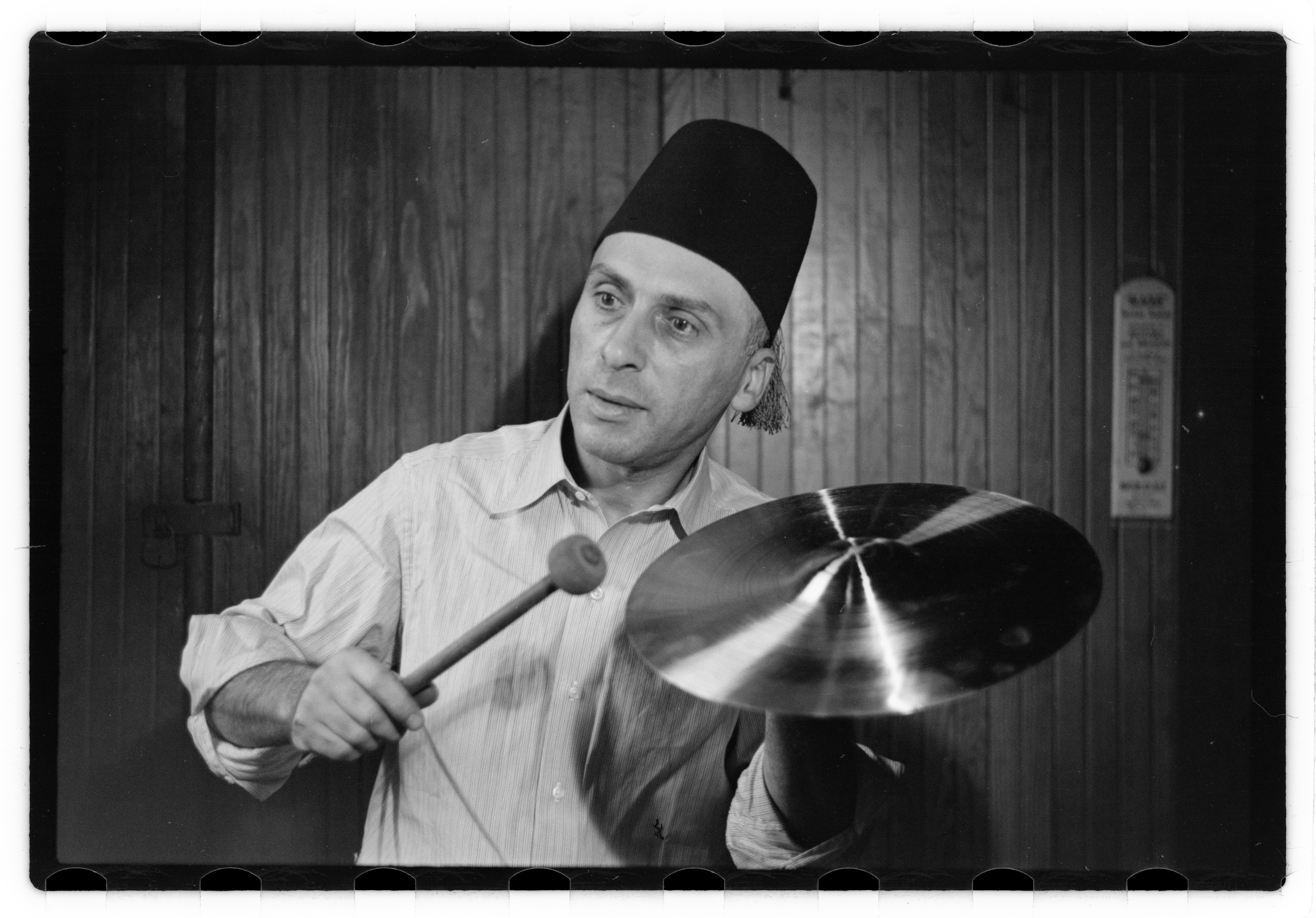
Avedis Zildjian, c. 1934

Avedis Zildjian III in front of the Zildjian Quincy Factory

After Kerope’s death, the business returned to Avedis’s side of the family. The eldest, Haroutune II, had become a lawyer and held a high position in the Ottoman government, thus he was not interested, and being a bachelor, he passed it to Aram. He was involved in the Armenian nationalist movement and resistance to the atrocities of the ruling Sultan, Abdul Hamid II. This was a time of political upheaval when the Ottoman Empire was in decline.

During Aram's exile, Kerope II's daughter Victoria oversaw the Constantinople factory. There are conflicting accounts, but it is thought that Aram returned there in 1926.

Haroutune II's son Avedis III had left Armenia for the United States in 1909, and settled in Boston, where he established a family and a confectionary business. In 1927, he received a letter from his uncle Aram, informing him that he was to become heir to the family business, and Aram came to the US. In 1928, Avedis III, his brother Puzant, and his uncle Aram Zildjian began manufacturing cymbals in Quincy, Massachusetts, and the Avedis Zildjian Co. was formed the following year in 1929.

Avedis III sought out jazz drummers such as Gene Krupa to understand their needs. The new cymbals he developed were widely adopted by swing and later bebop musicians, laying the foundations of the modern drum kit and playing technique.

Sales of Zildjian cymbals dramatically increased after Ringo Starr used the product in the Beatles' appearance on The Ed Sullivan Show in 1964. This created an enormous backorder situation. In 1968, in order to address this backlog, a second plant, the Azco factory, was opened in Meductic, New Brunswick, Canada.

In 1975, Zildjian began making K. Zildjian cymbals at the Azco plant. These were made until 1979. Within four years (1980), all K Cymbals were being made in the Norwell US plant, because the Ks demanded far more oversight. Armand worked with friends, the drummers Elvin Jones and Tony Williams to relaunch the K Series.

In early 1977, Armand Zildjian was appointed President of the Avedis Zildjian Company by his father. Soon after, Robert Zildjian split from the company amidst conflict with his brother, Armand. In 1981, Robert started making Sabian cymbals in the Canadian Azco factory.

=== 21st century ===
In 2002, Armand died at age 81. The Zildjian alloy recipe passed to his daughters, Craigie and Debbie (14th generation), both of whom continue to run the family business from the current headquarters in Norwell, Massachusetts.

In 2010, Zildjian acquired the Vic Firth Company and in 2018 acquired the Mike Balter Mallet company.

== See also ==
- List of oldest companies
- Sabian – Cymbal maker founded by Robert Zildjian after a family/legal dispute
- List of drum makers
