= Forest City Border Crossing =

Canada–United States border crossing

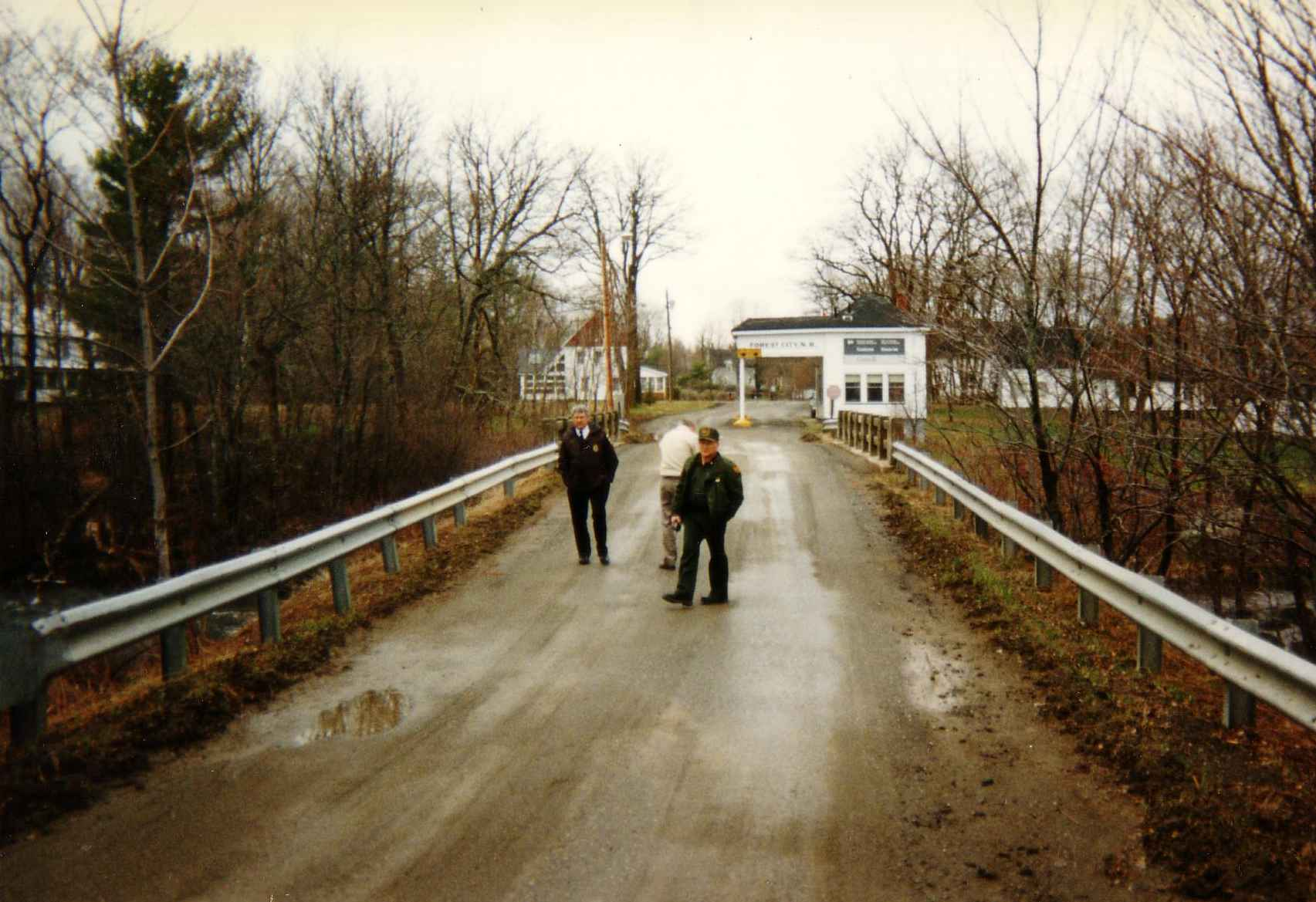
- International Bridge and Canada Border Station at Forest City, New Brunswick

Locaiton
- Country: United States; Canada
- Location: Forest City Road / Forest City Bridge; US Port: 1 Main Street, Forest City, Maine 04471; Canadian Port: 1699 Forest City Road, Forest City NB E6H 1Z6
- Coordinates: 45.663007°N 67.728347°W

Details
- Opened: 1929

Website
- http://www.cbp.gov/contact/ports/houlton

The Forest City Border Crossing connects the towns of Forest City, Maine and Forest City, New Brunswick on the Canada–US border. At this crossing, Canada is still operating the original border station built in 1931. The US built a new border station in 2013, replacing a building that was built in 1964. The original plans called for a much larger facility, but the design was scaled back at the request of local residents. Open from 8am to 4pm, in 2015, fewer than seven cars a day used the crossing.

== See also ==
- List of Canada–United States border crossings
