= Chiputneticook Lakes =

Group of lakes on the US–Canada border

Coordinates: 45°40′N 67°45′W

The Chiputneticook Lakes are a group of several lakes along the international boundary between Maine and New Brunswick.

They are East Grand Lake, North Lake, Mud Lake, Spednic Lake, and Palfrey Lake.

This lake system forms the head waters of the St. Croix River which the International Boundary follows to Passamaquoddy Bay.

Chiputneticook comes from the Passamaquody Chiputneticook, "great fork river", a possible reference to the St. Croix River.

== See also ==
- List of lakes of New Brunswick
- Forest City, New Brunswick
- Forest City, Maine
