= Vic Firth Company =

American drumstick and mallet manufacturing company

- Type: Private
- Industry: Manufacturer of percussion sticks and mallets, salt and pepper mills, and rolling pins
- Founded: 1963; 63 years ago
- Number of locations: Norwell, Massachusetts (headquarters, manufacturing); Newport, Maine (manufacturing)
- Key people: Vic Firth, founder
- Website: VicFirth.com

Founded in 1963 and headquartered in Norwell, Massachusetts, the Vic Firth Company is the world's largest manufacturer of drumsticks and mallets, which are made in their factories in Newport, Maine, and Norwell. In 2010, the company merged with Avedis Zildjian Company; officials said at the time that the companies would continue to run independently.

== History ==
The company began when Vic Firth, who had been performing with the Boston Symphony Orchestra for 12 years, was asked to perform pieces which he felt required a higher-quality drumstick than those that were currently being manufactured. Firth decided to design a set of his own sticks.

Firth hand-whittled the prototypes from thicker sticks and sent these to a wood turner in Montreal, Quebec, Canada. The two prototypes that he sent would become the SD1 and SD2, the first two models of sticks manufactured by Vic Firth, Inc. Firth said, "It came out of necessity, not of imagination or my ability to start a company." Although the sticks were initially intended for Firth's personal use, they gained popularity among his students and were eventually carried by retailers.

As of 2012, the company offered about 300 products, and made 12 million sticks a year. The company also produced a line of pepper mills, salt grinders, and rolling pins sold under the Vic Firth Gourmet brand for many years until those interests were sold to Maine Wood Concepts of New Vineyard, Maine, in 2012 and re-branded under the name Fletchers' Mill.

== See also ==
- List of drum manufacturers
