= Mud Lake (Maine) =

There are several lakes named Mud Lake within the U.S. state of Maine.

- Mud Lake, Aroostook County, Maine. 45°55′52″N 68°09′24″W
- Mud Lake, Aroostook County, Maine. 46°00′34″N 67°56′36″W
- Mud Lake, Aroostook County, Maine. 46°01′57″N 68°02′51″W
- Mud Lake, Aroostook County, Maine. 46°09′52″N 68°26′11″W
- Mud Lake, Aroostook County, Maine. 46°55′47″N 68°12′16″W
- Mud Lake, Aroostook County, Maine. 47°01′19″N 67°49′57″W
- Mud Lake, Aroostook County, Maine. 47°05′00″N 68°05′45″W
- Mud Lake, Fish River chain of lakes. 47°09′13″N 68°17′33″W
- Mud Lake, Washington County, Maine. 44°57′56″N 67°29′24″W
- Mud Lake, Washington County, Maine. 45°06′56″N 67°13′52″W
- Mud Lake, Washington County, Maine. 45°40′30″N 67°43′33″W
