= Vic Firth =

American drummer and timpanist (1930–2015)

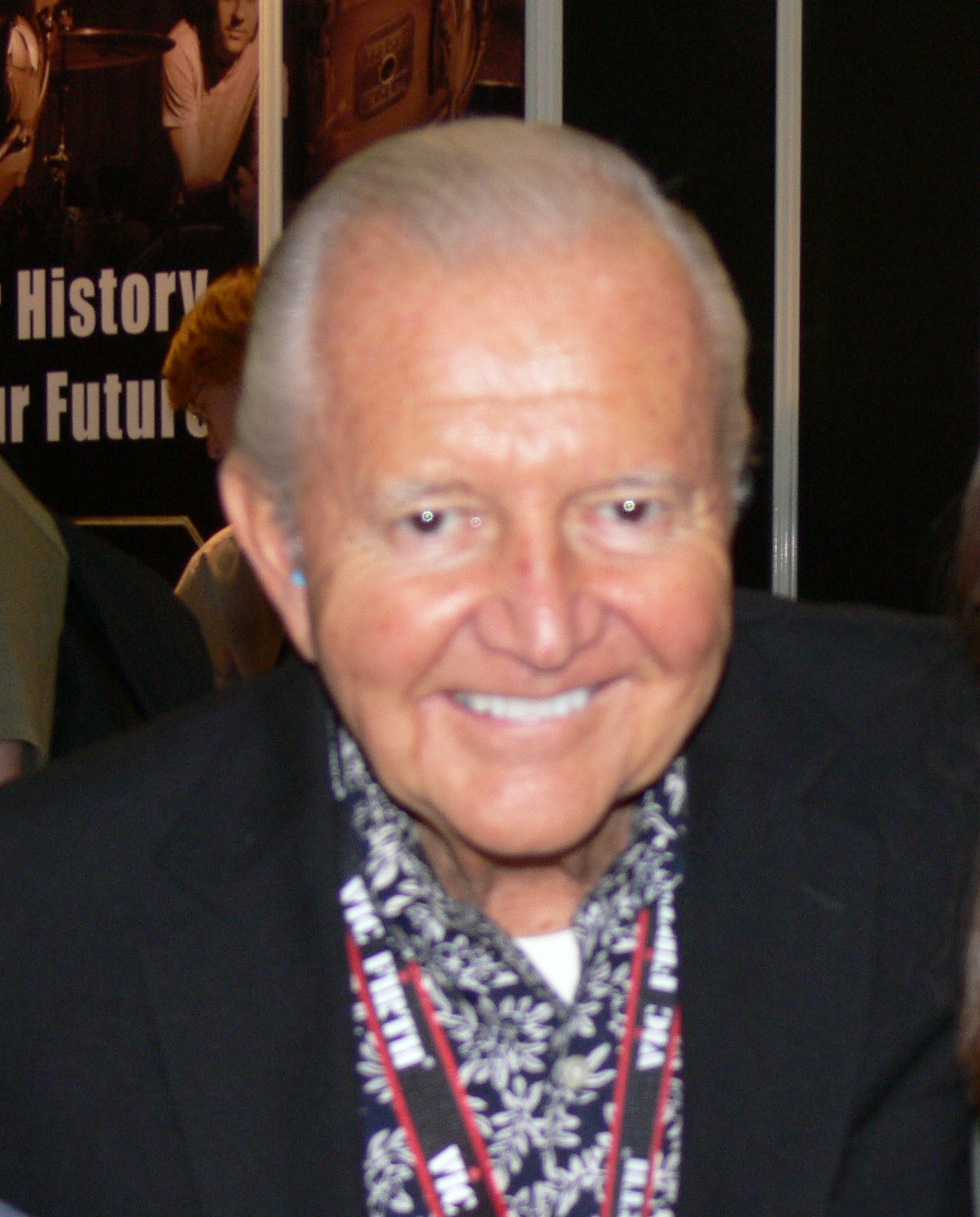
- Vic Firth in 2006

Background information
- Born: Everett Joseph Firth; June 2, 1930; Winchester, Massachusetts, U.S.
- Died: July 26, 2015 (aged 85) Boston, Massachusetts, U.S.
- Occupations: Musician, business owner
- Instruments: Percussion instruments, drums, timpani
- Years active: 1946–2015
- Website: VicFirth.com

Everett Joseph "Vic" Firth (June 2, 1930 – July 26, 2015) was an American musician and the founder of the Vic Firth Company, a manufacturer of percussion sticks and mallets. He was best known for his long-standing role as principal timpanist of the Boston Symphony Orchestra.

== Biography ==
Vic Firth was born June 2, 1930, in Winchester, Massachusetts. He was raised in Sanford, Maine by parents Everett E. and Rosemary Firth, where he graduated from Sanford High School. Son of a successful trumpet player, he started learning the cornet at age four, turning later to percussion, trombone, clarinet, piano, and music arrangement. When he reached high school, he was a full-time percussionist, and created an 18-piece band at age 16. He played a variety of percussion instruments such as vibraphone, timpani, and the drum set. He held a bachelor's degree, as well as an honorary doctorate in music from New England Conservatory in Boston.

Firth was the principal timpanist of the Boston Symphony Orchestra from 1956 to 2002. He was the orchestra's youngest member when music director Charles Munch hired him as a percussionist in 1952.

Firth wrote several books in his career. He wrote The Solo Timpanist in 1963, followed by Marching Drums in 1964. He wrote for beginning snare drum with his Snare Drum Method Book I - Elementary and Snare Drum Method Book II - Intermediate, published in 1967 and 1968. These books combined the concepts of orchestral snare drum technique with 30 Drum rudiments. He published the more advanced book The Solo Snare Drummer in 1968.

Firth died at the age of 85 on July 26, 2015, at his home in Boston, Massachusetts.

== See also ==
- Vic Firth Company
