= Canterbury, New Brunswick =

Canterbury
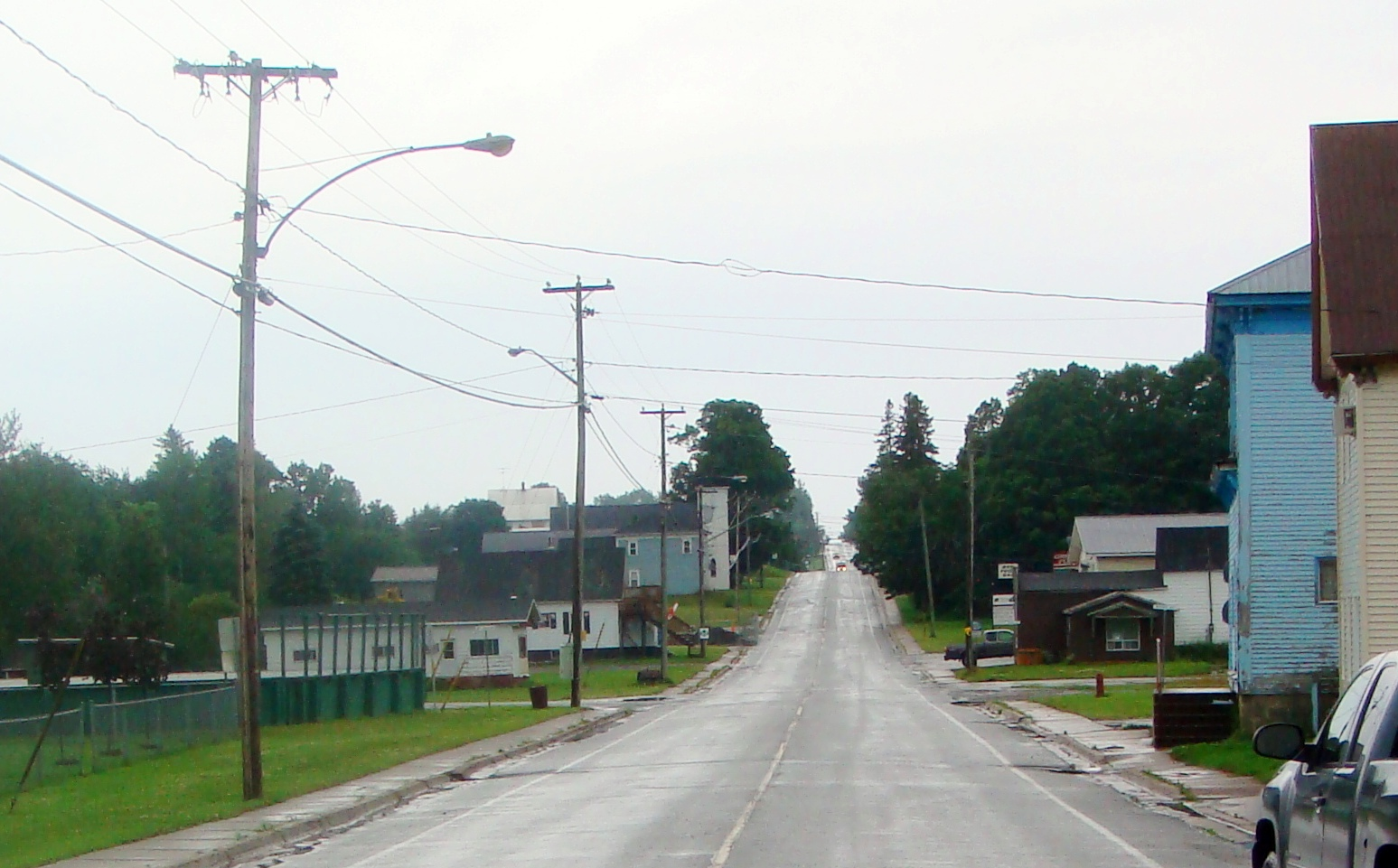
- Canterbury Main Street

- Location within New Brunswick
- Coordinates: 45°53′21″N 67°27′50″W
- Country: Canada
- Province: New Brunswick
- County: York
- Parish: Canterbury
- Municipality: Lakeland Ridges
- Incorporated: 1966

Area
  - Land: 5.32 km^{2} (2.05 sq mi)

Population (2021)
  - Total: 320
  - Density: 60.2/km^{2} (156/sq mi)
  - Change (2016–21): ▼4.8%
- Time zone: UTC-4 (EST)
  - Summer (DST): UTC-3 (EDT)
- Website: Canterbury Website

Canterbury is a former village in York County, in the Canadian province of New Brunswick. It held village status prior to 2023 and is now part of the village of Lakeland Ridges. The community is west of the Trans-Canada Highway at the intersection of Route 122 and Route 630.

It is named for Thomas Manners-Sutton (1814–77), later third Viscount Canterbury, who served as Lieutenant-Governor of New Brunswick from 1854-1861. Parrish erected in 1855.

== History ==
Tracing its roots to the forestry and railway industries, Canterbury was once home to over 1,000 residents and served as a service centre for the surrounding area of western York County. There were at least three general stores, a small department store, a railway hotel, bank, and a butcher as late as the mid-1960s, but they are all gone now.

Early settlers of the area were Loyalists ( possibly disbanded soldiers of the King's American Regiment and their families ) displaced by the end of the American Revolution (1780s) later augmented by immigrants from Ireland (Ulster, circa 1840).

In the winter of 1865, Canterbury was briefly the focus of much military activity when some 9000 British troops passed through the village on their way to "The Canadas" (Ontario and Quebec). The British government had become alarmed about the possibility of an American invasion following the end of the American Civil War and sent this military contingent to reinforce the garrisons in The Canadas. As it was winter, the shipping season in the St. Lawrence River was closed leaving overland travel from British colonies in the Maritimes as the only option. The closest rail connection to Quebec from the Atlantic coast in the 1860s was the New Brunswick and Canada Railway line extending from the port of St. Andrews through Canterbury to the end of rails in nearby Richmond Corner. The large contingent of British troops debarked passenger trains at the station and were then driven by horse-drawn sleigh up the Saint John River and then across to St Lawrence to Levis (opposite Quebec City) where they re-boarded passenger trains operated by the Grand Trunk Railway.

Prior to 1966 Canterbury was a local improvement district governed by a chairman and secretary and 3 councillors and then in 1966, it was incorporated as a village, with a mayor, secretary and 3 councillors later adding a fourth councillor and at present has a village office on Main Street.

On 1 January 2023, Canterbury amalgamated with the village of Meductic and all or part of five local service districts to form the new village of Lakeland Ridges. The community's name remains in official use.

== Demographics ==
In the 2021 Census of Population conducted by Statistics Canada, Canterbury had a population of 320 living in 135 of its 142 total private dwellings, a change of −4.8% from its 2016 population of 336. With a land area of 5.32 km^{2} (2.05 sq mi), it had a population density of 60.2/km^{2} (155.8/sq mi) in 2021.

Historical populations: Canterbury, NB
Year	Pop.	±%
2001	399	—
2006	360	−9.8%
2011	336	−6.7%
2016	336	+0.0%
2021	320	−4.8%

== Infrastructure ==
The New Brunswick and Canada Railway extended the former St. Andrews and Quebec Railway line to Canterbury in 1859, placing Canterbury roughly halfway between Woodstock to the north and McAdam to the south. The New Brunswick and Canada Railway was purchased by the New Brunswick Railway in 1882. In 1890, the New Brunswick Railway was purchased by the Canadian Pacific Railway, which operated the line through Canterbury to serve its rail network in the upper Saint John River valley until rail service was abandoned in the early 1990s. The original CPR passenger station on Water Street in Canterbury was demolished in the 2000s and the rail line is now a rail trail and part of the Sentier NB Trail system.

== Education ==
Canterbury has a school called Canterbury High School, which educates students from kindergarten to grade 12 all in one building. The school has escaped closure several times but had its future sealed in 2002 with an extensive construction overhaul and addition of a new gym. Prior to 1975, Canterbury High School held grades 7–12, The Old Green School house beside Mill Street housed Grade 1, 2, 3 and 6 and Grades 4 and 5 were held in Meductic School.

== See also ==
- List of communities in New Brunswick
