= East Grand Lake =

Lake in Canada and the United States

- Location within Maine Location within the United States
- Location: Maine / New Brunswick
- Coordinates: 45°42′N 67°48′W
- Type: oligotrophic
- Catchment area: 137 square miles (350 km^{2})
- Basin countries: Canada, United States
- Max. length: 22 mi (35 km)
- Max. width: 4 mi (6 km)
- Surface area: 15,917 acres (6,441 ha)
- Average depth: 28 feet (8.5 m)
- Max. depth: 128 ft (39 m)
- Water volume: 499,403 acre⋅ft (616,005,000 m^{3})
- Residence time: 1.7 years
- Shore length^{1}: 78.8 miles (126.8 km)
- Surface elevation: 434 feet (132 m)
- ^{1} Shore length is not a well-defined measure.

East Grand Lake is located between the U.S. state of Maine and the Canadian province of New Brunswick. The boundary between the United States and Canada passes through the lake. In Maine it falls within two counties, Washington and Aroostook, and in New Brunswick it serves as the western boundary of York County.

The lake is part of the Chiputneticook chain of lakes which also include Spednic, North, and Palfrey and form the headwaters of the St. Croix River. Formerly they were called the Shoodic Lakes.

East Grand Lake is known for its fishing and scenery. The lake is 22 miles (35 km) long and 4 miles (6 km) in width at its widest point. The maximum depth of the lake is 128 ft (39 m).

Fishing is popular on East Grand Lake. The lake is home to several species including landlocked salmon, lake trout, yellow perch, white perch, smallmouth bass, American eel, brook trout, and many more.

Water levels of East Grand Lake are controlled by operation of the Forest City Dam in Forest City, New Brunswick. The dam is controlled and operated by Woodland Pulp, which in 2016 applied to the Federal Energy Regulatory Commission (FERC) to surrender its control of the dam to the St. Croix International Waterway Commission. As of May 2025 the application is still under review.

== See also ==
- List of lakes of New Brunswick
