= Meductic, New Brunswick =

Meductic
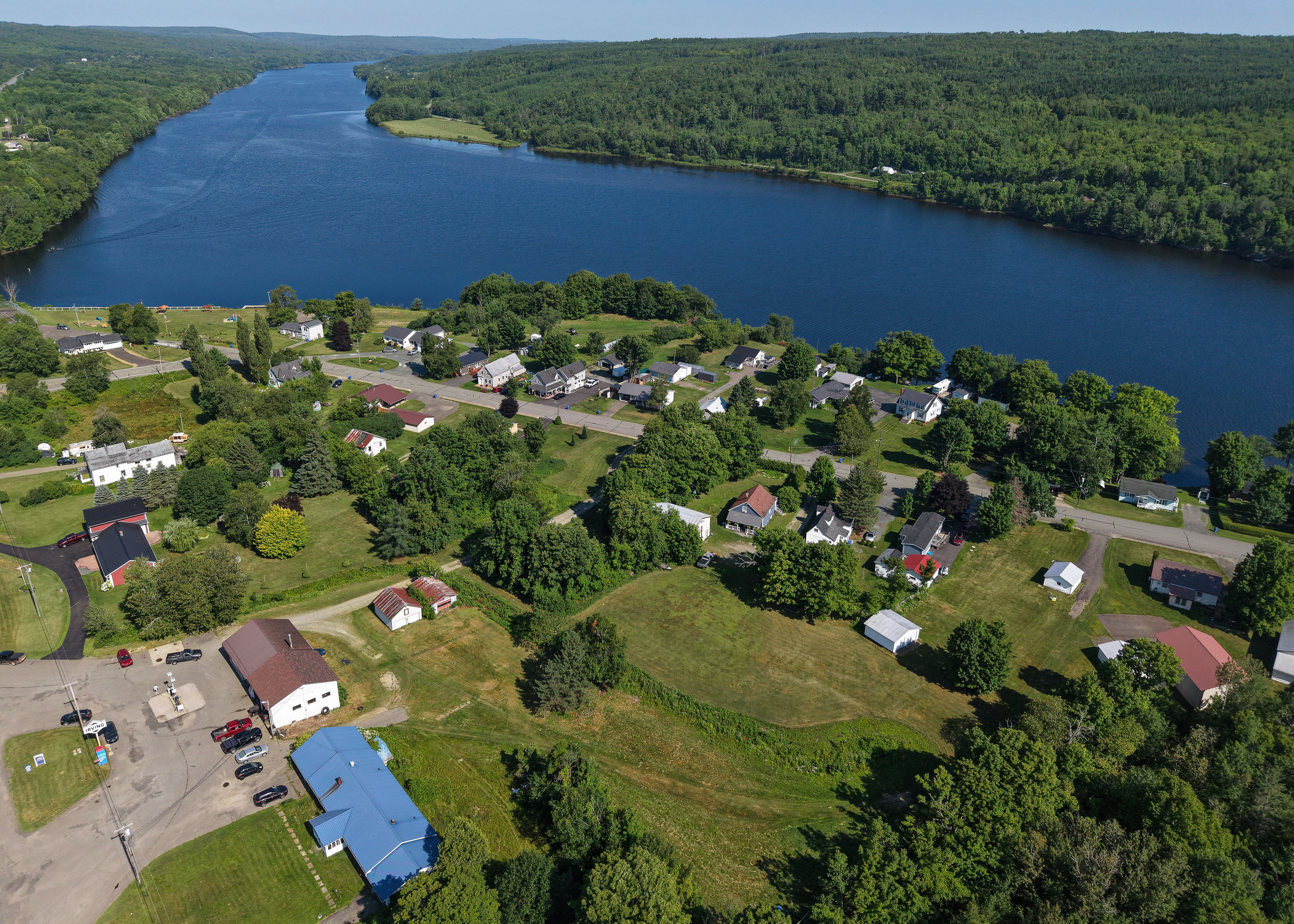
- Meductic in 2026

- Location of Meductic within New Brunswick Meductic (Canada)
- Coordinates: 45°59′42″N 67°29′03″W
- Country: Canada
- Province: New Brunswick
- County: York County
- Parish: Canterbury Parish
- Municipality: Lakeland Ridges

Area
  - Land: 6.26 km^{2} (2.42 sq mi)

Population (2021)
  - Total: 180
  - Density: 28.7/km^{2} (74/sq mi)
  - Change (2016–21): ▼16.3%
- Demonym: Meductite
- Time zone: UTC−4 (Atlantic (AST))
  - Summer (DST): UTC−3 (Atlantic Daylight Time (ADT))
- Canadian Postal code: E6H
- Area code: 506
- NTS Map: 021G11
- GNBC Code: DBAQZ

Meductic is a community and former municipality along the Saint John River in southern New Brunswick, Canada. It held village status prior to 2023 and is now part of the village of Lakeland Ridges. It is approximately 33 kilometres southeast of Woodstock.

== History ==
During the Expulsion of the Acadians, the village was burned in the St. John River Campaign (1758). Until the 18th century, Meductic was the largest settlement of the Wolastoqiyik people.

On 1 January 2023, Meductic amalgamated with the village of Canterbury and all or part of five local service districts to form the new village of Lakeland Ridges. The community's name remains in official use.

== Demographics ==
In the 2021 Census of Population conducted by Statistics Canada, Meductic had a population of 180 living in 83 of its 93 total private dwellings, a change of −16.3% from its 2016 population of 215. With a land area of 6.26 km^{2} (2.42 sq mi), it had a population density of 28.8/km^{2} (74.5/sq mi) in 2021.

== See also ==
- List of communities in New Brunswick
