= Spednic Lake =

Lake in Canada and Maine

- Location within New Brunswick Location within Canada Location within Maine Location within the United States
- Location: Washington County, Maine, United States and York County, New Brunswick, Canada
- Coordinates: 45°36′18″N 67°37′40″W
- Type: mesotrophic
- Primary inflows: Mud Lake Stream (at times also called the St. Croix River) and at least 20 other waterways
- Primary outflows: St. Croix River
- Catchment area: 413 sq mi (1,070 km^{2})
- Basin countries: Canada, United States
- Max. length: 17 mi (27 km)
- Surface area: 17,219 acres (6,968 ha)
- Average depth: 20 ft (6.1 m)
- Max. depth: 54 ft (16 m)
- Shore length^{1}: 105.9 mi (170.4 km)
- Surface elevation: 380 ft (120 m)
- Islands: multiple
- Settlements: Canada: North Lake Parish / McAdam Parish; USA: North Washington / Vanceboro
- ^{1} Shore length is not a well-defined measure.

Spednic Lake (sometimes Spednik Lake or Spednick Lake) is a mesotrophic lake in the Chiputneticook Lakes chain along the Canada–United States border between the state of Maine and the province of New Brunswick that is best known for its bass fishing. Sometimes it is viewed as the headwaters of the St. Croix River, sometimes a lake further up the chain is considered the headwaters. The international border runs through the lake. A northeastern arm of the lake, located entirely in Canada, retains the name Palfrey Lake. Prior to dam construction that expanded Spednic Lake they were separate lakes, but now they are hydrologically and ecologically a single combined lake.

The first dam at the outlet of the lake was constructed in 1836 with a 15-foot (4.6 m) impoundment level. Over the years the dam has been modified and is now known as the Vanceboro Dam. Waterflow from this dam and others upstream are regulated by the International St. Croix River Board that is appointed by the International Joint Commission between the United States and Canada.

The lake shores are primarily undeveloped, and held in conservation or protected status, either through land ownership or easement, by the state of Maine and the province of New Brunswick. Small portions remain in private hands. The principal access in Maine is via a public boat launch in the town of Vanceboro. Canoes can also be portaged from elsewhere in the watershed.

== Fish and history ==
Sport fishing on the lake, as well as on others in the watershed, is a major source of economic activity in the region. The three primary fisheries are for smallmouth bass, landlocked salmon, and white perch. Other fish species in the lake of potential interest to fishermen include brown bullhead (locally known as hornpout), burbot (locally known as cusk), chain pickerel, lake whitefish, pumpkinseed, rainbow smelt, and yellow perch. Bait and other fish species in the lake include American eel, common shiner, creek chub, fallfish, golden shiner, landlocked alewives, ninespine stickleback, northern pearl dace, and white sucker.

The lake is renowned for a smallmouth bass fishery. The bass had been introduced into the watershed in the 1800s and became firmly established on their own. The lake was noted for its exceptional fishery in several outdoor magazines of national publication over the years. In the 1980s this fishery largely collapsed, for reasons that are debated, but are most likely the combined effect of rebounding alewife populations following a downstream fishway modification and large lake water level drawdowns. Simultaneous changes in anadromous fish access and the water management regime, plus a temporary closure to bass fishing, have allowed it to largely rebound and be reopened for fishing, though the number of large old trophy fish remains low enough that the fishery is viewed as still recovering.

There is also a mixed native and stocked landlocked salmon fishery in select portions of the lake, including the Palfrey Lake arm. Those interested in fishing for salmon are advised to hire a local guide. The landlocked salmon population has suffered since landlocked alewives were illegally introduced in 1997, probably from the Great Lakes.

Archaeological evidence from roughly 2,000 B.C. shows that American shad and anadromous alewife were passing through the lake and being caught at Mud Lake Falls on the main inlet to the lake. As this falls is judged impassable to alewives, this species was spawning in the lake. Due to the bass fishery collapse, the fishway over the Vanceboro dam was modified in 1988 to prevent alewife access while continuing to allow salmon access. Legislative battles in 2001 and 2008 were about restoring alewife access below the Vanceboro dam, not about restoring them to Spednic Lake, but the history of fisheries in Spednic Lake was a large driver of the discussion, and more than a third of the alewife habitat in the St. Croix watershed is in or above Spednic Lake.

In 1861, draft dodgers from the American Civil War, founded a settlement known as the Musquash settlement overlooking the southeastern end of the lake on Skaddle ridge. It thrived through 1871, and dwindled thereafter. It is now an archaeological site and a small village known as Pemberton Ridge.

== See also ==
- List of lakes of New Brunswick
- List of lakes in Maine
