= Forest City, New Brunswick =

Coordinates: 45°40′N 67°44′W

Forest City
- Interactive map of Forest City
- Country: Canada
- Province: New Brunswick
- County: York County

Population (2001)
  - Total: 12
- Time zone: UTC-4 (AST)
  - Summer (DST): UTC-3 (ADT)
- Canadian Postal code: E6H 1Z6,
- Area code: 506
- Telephone Exchange: 894
- NTS Map: 021G12
- GNBC Code: DAFPB

Forest City (2001 pop.: 12) is a rural community in York County, New Brunswick, Canada.

The community has the unusual distinction of sharing its name with the community of Forest City immediately across the Canada–United States border in the state of Maine, connected by the Forest City Border Crossing.

Forest City was once home to 1,000 residents, where its proximity to the waters of East Grand Lake and the softwood forests of the upper St. Croix River watershed provided a lucrative tanning industry that supported an active economy. Remnants of industry can still be found today.

The community houses a Baptist church, cemetery, and a small water control dam.

== Notable people ==
Blaine Higgs, the 34th Premier of New Brunswick, lived in Forest City during his childhood. When later speaking about Forest City, he gave a year-round population estimate of seven, additionally saying that it "survives because of the summer activity, not because of any industry or economic development."

== See also ==
- List of communities in New Brunswick
