= Lakeland Ridges =

- Village
- Municipality of Lakeland Ridges
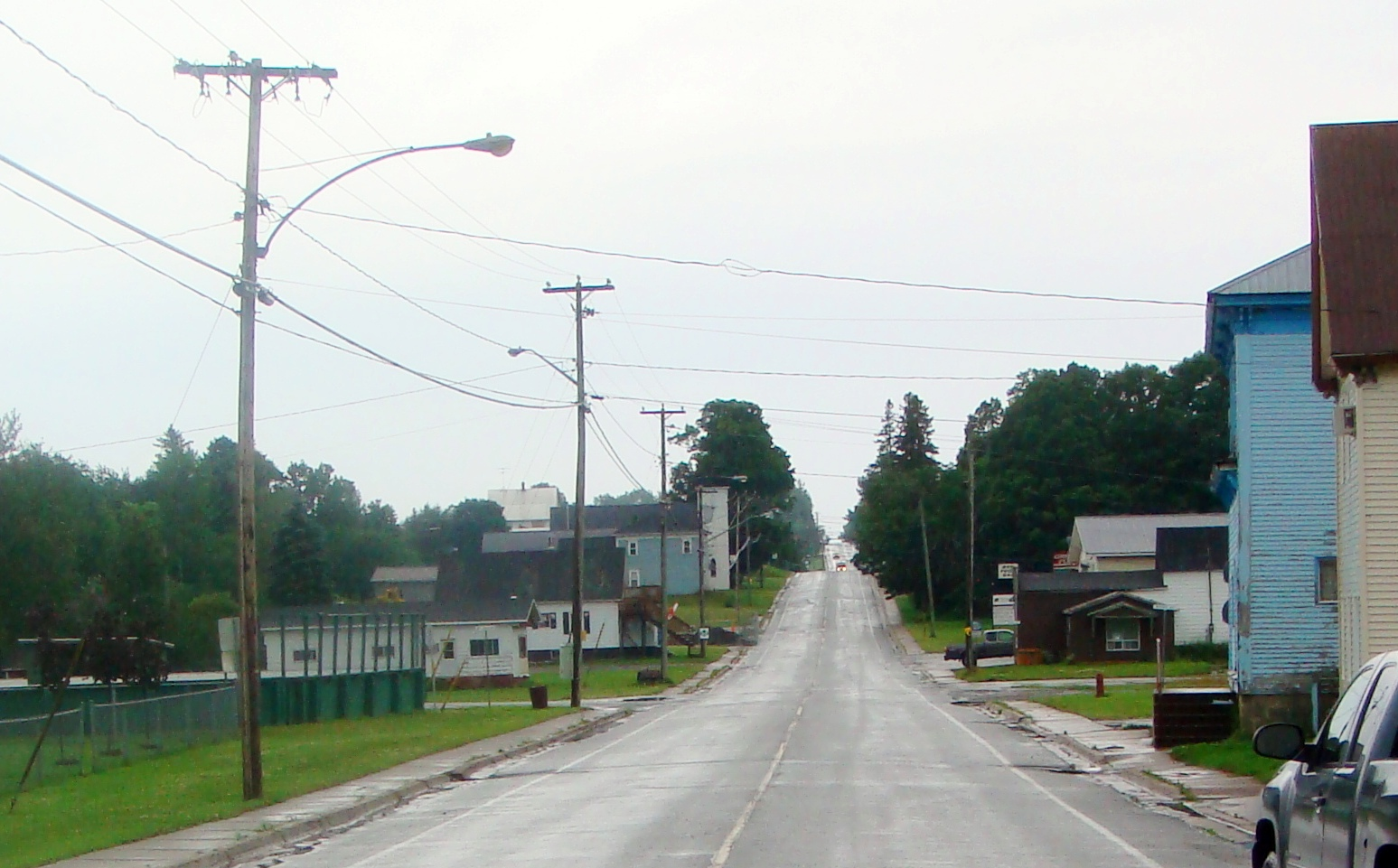
- Lakeland Ridges Main Street

- Location within New Brunswick
- Coordinates: 45°52′21″N 67°27′50″W
- Country: Canada
- Province: New Brunswick
- County: York
- Regional service commission: Western Valley
- Incorporated: January 1, 2023

Government
  - Mayor: Gregory (Greg) Grant
- Time zone: UTC-4 (AST)
  - Summer (DST): UTC-3 (ADT)

Lakeland Ridges is a village in the Canadian province of New Brunswick. The jurisdiction was formed through the 2023 New Brunswick local governance reforms which saw the consolidation of local government entities into regions or districts.

== History ==
Lakeland Ridges was incorporated on January 1, 2023 via the amalgamation of the former villages of Canterbury and Meductic as well as the concurrent annexation of adjacent unincorporated areas.

== Infrastructure ==
The New Brunswick and Canada Railway extended the former St. Andrews and Quebec Railway line to Canterbury in 1859, placing Lakeland Ridges roughly halfway between Woodstock to the north and McAdam to the south. The New Brunswick and Canada Railway was purchased by the New Brunswick Railway in 1882. In 1890, the New Brunswick Railway was purchased by the Canadian Pacific Railway, which operated the line through Canterbury to serve its rail network in the upper Saint John River valley until rail service was abandoned in the early 1990s. The original CPR passenger station on Water Street in Canterbury was demolished in the 2000s and the rail line is now a rail trail and part of the Sentier NB Trail system.

== Education ==
Lakeland Ridges has a school called Canterbury High School, which educates students from kindergarten to grade 12 all in one building. The school has escaped closure several times but had its future sealed in 2002 with an extensive construction overhaul and addition of a new gym. Prior to 1975, Canterbury High School held grades 7–12, The Old Green School house beside Mill Street housed Grade 1, 2, 3 and 6 and Grades 4 and 5 were held in Meductic School.

== See also ==
- List of communities in New Brunswick
- List of municipalities in New Brunswick
